= Prince Bernhard of Saxe-Weimar-Eisenach (1878–1900) =

German royal

Prince Bernhard
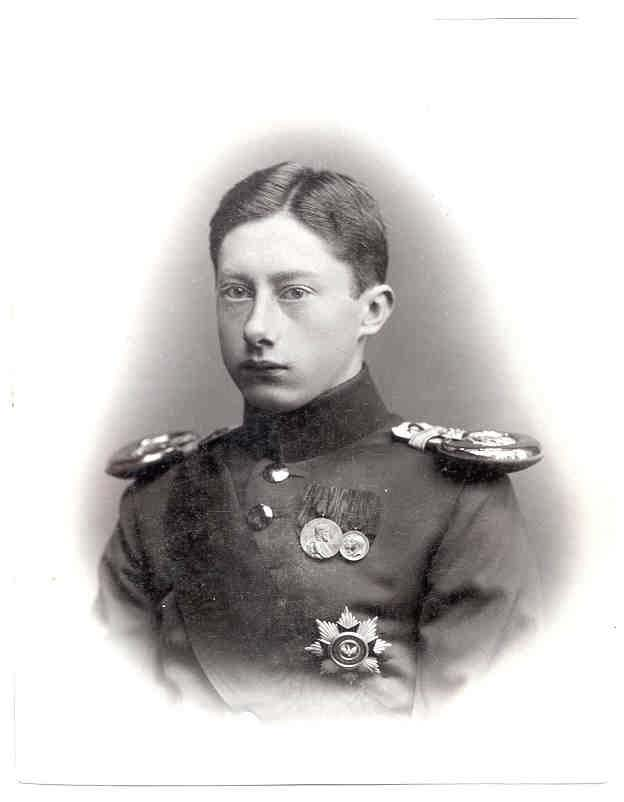
- Bernhard in 1899
- Born: 18 April 1878; Weimar
- Died: 1 October 1900 (aged 22); Weimar
Names
- Bernhard Carl Alexander Hermann Heinrich Wilhelm Oscar Friedrich Franz Peter
- House: House of Saxe-Weimar-Eisenach
- Father: Charles Augustus, Hereditary Grand Duke of Saxe-Weimar-Eisenach
- Mother: Princess Pauline of Saxe-Weimar-Eisenach
- Religion: Lutheranism

Prince Bernhard of Saxe-Weimar-Eisenach (Bernhard Carl Alexander Hermann Heinrich Wilhelm Oscar Friedrich Franz Peter; 18 April 1878 – 1 October 1900) was a member of the Grand Ducal House of Saxe-Weimar-Eisenach and a Lieutenant in the Prussian Army. He bore the titles "Prince of Saxe-Weimar-Eisenach, Duke of Saxony" with the style "Highness".

== Birth and family ==
Prince Bernhard was born in Weimar the second son of Charles Augustus, Hereditary Grand Duke of Saxe-Weimar-Eisenach and his wife Princess Pauline of Saxe-Weimar-Eisenach. He was the younger brother of the last Grand Duke of Saxe-Weimar-Eisenach, William Ernest. His grandparents on his father's side were the reigning Grand Duke Charles Alexander and his wife Princess Sophie of the Netherlands, through whom he was in the line of succession to the Dutch throne.

== Suitor to Dutch Queen Wilhelmina ==
Closely related to the Dutch Royal Family from a young age Prince Bernhard was seen as the ideal husband to the young Queen Wilhelmina of the Netherlands and was brought up to look upon himself as her future consort, with her mother Queen Emma a proponent of the match. Although an engagement was reported to be close on numerous occasions the young Queen was not a fan of the match describing her cousin Prince Bernhard as "not handsome" and "not sensible".

When Queen Wilhelmina did not return Prince Bernhard's affection he was reported to have become depressed, dying at the age of 22 in Weimar. His sudden death was reported to be the result of tuberculosis although there were rumors he may have committed suicide. Shortly after his death Queen Wilhelmina's engagement was announced to Duke Henry of Mecklenburg-Schwerin.

== Ancestry ==
Ancestors of Prince Bernhard of Saxe-Weimar-Eisenach (1878–1900)

8. Charles Frederick, Grand Duke of Saxe-Weimar-Eisenach
4. Charles Alexander, Grand Duke of Saxe-Weimar-Eisenach
9. Grand Duchess Maria Pavlovna of Russia
2. Charles Augustus, Hereditary Grand Duke of Saxe-Weimar-Eisenach
10. William II of the Netherlands
5. Princess Sophie of the Netherlands
11. Grand Duchess Anna Pavlovna of Russia
1. Prince Bernhard of Saxe-Weimar-Eisenach
12. Prince Bernhard of Saxe-Weimar-Eisenach
6. Prince Hermann of Saxe-Weimar-Eisenach
13. Princess Ida of Saxe-Meiningen
3. Princess Pauline of Saxe-Weimar-Eisenach
14. William I of Württemberg
7. Princess Auguste of Württemberg
15. Duchess Pauline Therese of Württemberg
