= Princess Sophie of Saxe-Weimar-Eisenach (1888–1913) =

German princess (1888–1913)

Princess Sophie
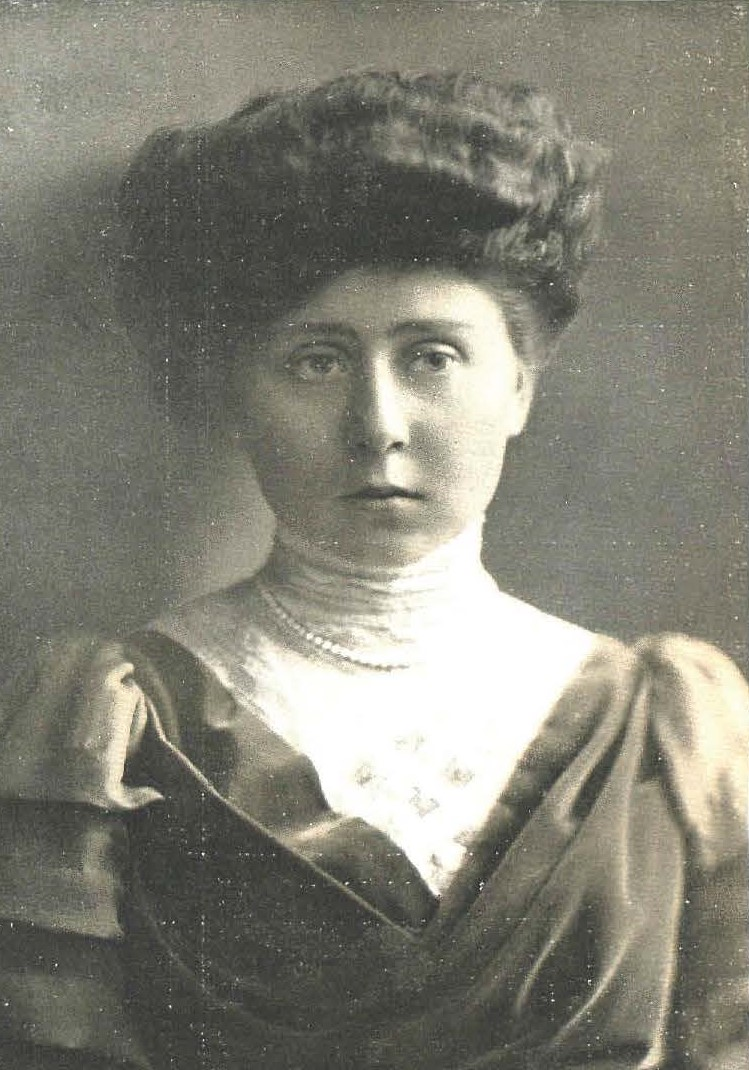
- Born: 25 July 1888; Düsseldorf
- Died: 18 September 1913 (aged 25); Heidelberg
- Burial: Weimar Royal Vault, Weimar, Germany
Names
- German: Sophie Augustine Ida Karoline Pauline Agnes Elisabeth Ernestine
- House: House of Saxe-Weimar-Eisenach
- Father: Prince William of Saxe-Weimar-Eisenach
- Mother: Princess Gerta of Ysenburg and Büdingen

Princess Sophie of Saxe-Weimar-Eisenach (25 July 1888 – 18 September 1913) was a great-granddaughter of Prince Bernhard of Saxe-Weimar-Eisenach, who was a younger brother of Charles Frederick, Grand Duke of Saxe-Weimar-Eisenach.

Her death by suicide in 1913 attracted significant media attention due to widespread reports of her family's opposition to her intended marriage to Hans von Bleichröder, the son of a prominent German banker. She is frequently cited by historians as one of the first European royal women to be cremated, a practice that was then considered highly controversial.

== Family and early life ==
Sophie was born in Düsseldorf as the only daughter of Prince William of Saxe-Weimar-Eisenach and his wife Princess Gerta of Ysenburg and Büdingen in Wächtersbach. She was a great great granddaughter of Charles Augustus, Grand Duke of Saxe-Weimar-Eisenach, as well as a great granddaughter of William I of Württemberg. On her mother's side, Sophie was a great granddaughter of Frederick William, Elector of Hesse's morganatic marriage to Gertrude Falkenstein, Princess of Hanau.

Due to her parents' lack of wealth, Sophie was brought up at Heidelberg, where they had settled for economy's sake; their family was mainly supported by gifts from the Weimar court. There she led the existence of a private lady of rank, and was able to travel with much more freedom than would have been possible at the Weimar court. Sophie was very popular in the city, especially among aristocratic students from the local university. She used to frequent the houses of notable people in the town; it was there that she met Hans von Bleichroeder, a rising lawyer and the son of a powerful banker. In addition, she and her parents were much beloved in Heidelberg for the interest they took in the poor and the general public welfare, in spite of their lack of wealth.

Her home life was said to be unhappy, as her elder brother Prince Hermann's affairs weighed heavily on her spirits. Just a few years previously, Hermann had lost his title and style, becoming known as Count Ostheim, after a long period of angering his family through extensive spending and later entering into a morganatic marriage with an actress.

Sophie was described as "a great beauty and much admired in Court society for her charming ways". She was said to be a musician, able to play several instruments. Sophie was also said to be a sportswoman.

== Suicide ==
=== Background ===
In early 1913, rumors emerged that Sophie wished to marry Hans von Bleichröder. Several other sources, such as Catherine Radziwill, tell a different account, stating that he was just an "intermediary", and that Sophie actually wished to marry someone else in the town. Most other reports list von Bleichröder as the man she wished to marry however. Though they were not equal in birth, newspapers reported that they were engaged regardless. In June 1913, Sophie applied to Emperor Wilhelm II's court for permission to wed. As it was assumed that Wilhelm, a great opponent of morganatic marriages, would most likely refuse, she openly declared that while she would prefer to marry with the Emperor's consent, she would eventually marry even without it.

Shortly after this event however, an official announcement was speedily issued by the Weimar royal court that allegations of their engagement were "groundless".

Another explanation, widely reported in newspapers as fact, is that her parents were agreeable to the marriage but the presiding head of the family, William Ernest, Grand Duke of Saxe-Weimar-Eisenach, a third cousin to the Princess, was not — not publicly mentioning von Bleichröder's Judaism as the reason, but that he was "inferior" – in the sense of being a mere Baron in a family only recently ennobled to that low rank, and a working man – as a banking executive. The Grand Duke would approve the marriage only if Sophie would first relinquish the title of Princess of Saxe-Weimar-Eisenach, essentially ceasing to use the family name and any royal honors. This Sophie refused to do, and since her father was utterly dependent on the allowance (appanage) paid him by the Grand Duke, the family was in a quandary although it was very possible that the von Bleichröder wealth would more than replace the Grand Duke's appanage.

=== Other possible causes ===
In addition to the family's refusal to consent to the marriage, there was another event that may have led to her suicide. A month earlier, Sophie traveled to France with her mother, Princess Gerda, and von Bleichröder, and the Princess's chauffeur, Walter Palmer. Enjoying taking long drives in the Fontainbleau Forest, on one night while driving at high speed, their vehicle struck and mortally injured a young Romani girl (referred to in contemporary press reports as a "gypsy girl"). The following day, von Bleichröder visited the girl's house and paid them the equivalent of $3,000 in compensation. During the subsequent legal proceedings, sworn statements established that the Princess, an experienced driver, had been at the wheel, while her chauffeur had initially taken the blame to protect her. The court subsequently dismissed the charges against both the chauffeur and von Bleichröder.Some newspapers hinted that the stress or guilt of this tragedy may have been instrumental in her suicide a month later, saying "Every effort was made to hush up the affair, owing to fear that the Princess's movements would become known to her father."

Although the narrative of a forbidden romance with von Bleichröder dominates historical accounts, an alternative version exists. However, this account relies solely on Princess Catherine Radziwill's 1920 book Secrets of Dethroned Royalty. Radziwill was a contemporary author known for sensationalist and often unverified royal gossip, and her claims are largely dismissed by modern historians. According to this unverified account, Sophie had actually fallen in love with a poor but well-born "Count T."..., required by her family's financial circumstances to live in the university town of Heidelberg instead of the metropolis of Weimar, had fallen deeply in love with a young man (identified only as "Count T.") of excellent but poor family. The two young people planned to elope and to conceal their plans, the princess pretended to carry on a romance instead with one of her sweetheart's friends, Baron von Bleichröder, "who consented with alacrity to play the part ... for he was flattered by the request to appear before the world as a suitor for the hand of a Princess of Weimar." However, Prince William and Princess Gerta intended on another match (presumably more prosperous) for their daughter, and they persuaded Count T to leave Heidelberg. Count T secretly arranged to continue to exchange love letters with Sophie using Bleichröder as intermediary. However, after the passage of time the Count, living in another city, found an heiress to his liking, and married her. Apparently he had not bothered to notify Sophie of these changes in his feelings and she discovered these developments only by reading of his marriage in a newspaper; she was so distraught that she killed herself that night. It was widely but erroneously believed that she was driven to suicide by the presumed opposition of her parents to Bleichröder, who, for his part, did not attempt to correct that impression "with evident satisfaction [of] the prestige he derived from his position as the man for whose sake a Royal Princess had shot herself. This awful catastrophe ... was for the Hebrew banker's son, merely a triumph of vanity, and he was glad to allow the world to think she had died for him." This version has not received any currency, although a different story, to the effect that the Princess had previously been carrying on a doomed romance with a Lt. Edler Herr von Putlitz, has circulated. The romance was doomed because although von Putlitz came from a family as aristocratic as that of the Princess, he was just as poor as her father. However, Lt. von Putlitz had died (possibly by suicide) in 1908.

=== Event and newspaper reports ===
At her father's house in Heidelberg on 18 September 1913, Sophie retired to her room "apparently in her usual spirits". A gunshot was heard shortly after midnight, and a servant found her with a gunshot through her forehead. Her death was at first announced to be the result of "paralysis of the heart". In reality, Sophie died by suicide, a fact that was eagerly picked up in German and foreign newspapers once new details emerged. The suicide was generally attributed to the opposition she had encountered at home to her desire to marry von Bleichröder.

Several days after her death, her father released a statement:

"Baron Hans von Bleichröder, like all acquaintances of the House of Saxe-Weimar, had a farewell view of the departed, but he was expressly forbidden to take part in the funeral or to attend the cremation. As for the stories set in circulation in regards to a marriage between Princess Sophie and Baron von Bleichröder, there needs to be repeated the oft-spoken statement of her father, that all the money in the world would never have sufficed to bridge the gulf between a Princess of Saxe-Weimar and Baron von Bleichroeder."

=== Remains and funeral ===
Sophie's body was cremated in 1913 in Heidelberg, and her remains were interred in the royal family's vault in Weimar. Sophie is believed to be the first European royal woman to be cremated; another relative of hers was the first European royal man to have his body thus disposed of. Her funeral was attended by only a small number of persons, most of whom were representatives of princely houses. As stated in her father's statement, von Bleichröder was not allowed to attend the funeral.

Baron Hans von Bleichröder was killed fighting for the German army at the Battle of Warsaw on 1 August 1915, at the age of 32.

== Ancestry ==
Ancestors of Princess Sophie of Saxe-Weimar-Eisenach (1888–1913)

8. Prince Bernhard of Saxe-Weimar-Eisenach
4. Prince Hermann of Saxe-Weimar-Eisenach
9. Princess Ida of Saxe-Meiningen
2. Prince Wilhelm of Saxe-Weimar-Eisenach
10. William I of Württemberg
5. Princess Augusta of Württemberg
11. Duchess Pauline of Württemberg
1. Princess Sophie of Saxe-Weimar-Eisenach
12. Adolf II, Count of Ysenburg and Büdingen in Wächtersbach
6. Ferdinand Maximilian III, Prince of Ysenburg and Büdingen
13. Countess Philippine of Ysenburg and Büdingen in Philippseich
3. Princess Gerta of Ysenburg and Büdingen in Wächtersbach
14. Frederick William, Elector of Hesse
7. Princess Auguste of Hanau and Hořowitz
15. Gertrude Falkenstein
