= Prince Hermann of Saxe-Weimar-Eisenach (1886–1964) =

Hermann
- Graf von Ostheim
- Born: 14 February 1886; Düsseldorf, German Empire
- Died: 6 June 1964 (aged 78); London, England
- Spouse: Wanda Paola Lottero (m. 1909; div. 1911) Suzanne Aagot Midling (m. 1918; died 1931) Isabel Neilson (m. 1932)
- Issue: Count Alexander Kyrill von Ostheim
Names
- German: Hermann Karl Bernhard Ferdinand Friedrich Wilhelm August Paul Philip von Sachsen-Weimar-Eisenach
- House: House of Saxe-Weimar-Eisenach
- Father: Prince William of Saxe-Weimar-Eisenach
- Mother: Princess Gerta of Ysenburg-Büdingen-Wächtersbach

Prince Hermann of Saxe-Weimar-Eisenach (14 February 1886 – 6 June 1964) was a member of the House of Saxe-Weimar-Eisenach. He was heir to his relative William Ernest, Grand Duke of Saxe-Weimar-Eisenach until 1909, when he was disinherited of his royal status. From that point onwards, Hermann was commonly referred to with the lesser style, Graf von Ostheim (Count of Ostheim).

== Early life ==
Prince Hermann of Saxe-Weimar-Eisenach was born on 14 February 1886 in Düsseldorf, as the son of Prince William of Saxe-Weimar-Eisenach and his wife, Princess Gerta of Ysenburg-Büdingen-Wächtersbach. He was educated by a tutor until deemed old enough to enter the Imperial German Army. He joined the Cuirassiers of the Guard in Berlin, where he was separated from the guidance of his family and tutor, and began to build up a reputation as a spendthrift like his father. He was given $10,000 a year to spend, and he and those he bought items from realized that any debts contracted would eventually be paid by his family, thus increasing the amount Hermann could spend.

By the end of the year, Hermann was a quarter of a million dollars in debt, which his family duly paid; he was sent to a small town as a disciplinary measure. He persuaded his family that he was ill, and was able to travel to Paris, racking up more debts along the way; one rumor said he sold his mother's jewels en route to France.

== Heir to Saxe-Weimar-Eisenach ==
William Ernest, Grand Duke of Saxe-Weimar-Eisenach remained childless for much of his early life, fueling speculation of the succession to his duchy. As a descendant of Charles Augustus, Grand Duke of Saxe-Weimar-Eisenach through a younger son, firstly Hermann and secondly his brother were heir presumptives until the birth of Charles Augustus, Hereditary Grand Duke of Saxe-Weimar-Eisenach in 1912.

=== Loss of inheritance ===
Coat of arms of the Grand Duchy of Saxe-Weimar-Eisenach

A lifelong spendthrift, Prince Hermann was heir presumptive to the duchy of Saxe-Weimar-Eisenach until his disinheritance on 2 August 1909. The ducal family forced him to renounce his rights of succession to the Saxe-Weimar-Eisenach throne, as well as his royal status, title and prerogatives, granting him a lesser, noble title, Count von Ostheim, along with a small allowance on the grounds that he stay out of the duchy. Herman was not the only member of his family to have a bad reputation; his father Prince William as well as their cousin Prince Bernhard were all viewed with displeasure, so much so, that the still-living Prince William had been overlooked concerning the duchy's succession. Hermann had a younger brother, Prince Albert, who took up his position as next-in-line to the duchy. Hermann was also driven out of the German army "for all sorts of unsavory scrapes", as he was wanted in both England and Austria for debts, and for being a "common swindler". His Austrian arrest warrant was issued soon after his younger sister Princess Sophie of Saxe-Weimar-Eisenach was denied permission to enter into a morganatic marriage; she committed suicide soon after, on 18 September 1913.

In 1921 Count Hermann claimed in a lawsuit with Grand Duke William Ernest that he and his mother were induced by a ruse and told that he would be forcibly expelled from Paris unless he agreed to travel from there to Germany; instead Hermann was confined in an insane asylum. He was only freed after signing documents renouncing all claims to Saxe-Weimar-Eisenach and assuming the style Count von Ostheim. Hermann went on to claim that the Grand Duke was guilty of usury, as he was lent certain sums of money to pay off his debts in exchange for renouncing 48,000 marks appanage in favor of William Ernest. During that time, the German government had been completing negotiations for a settlement on the former royal family (their titles had been abolished in 1918); thus had Hermann not been disinherited, he would have stood to inherit quite a large bit of money.

== Marriage ==
Before he became disinherited, Prince Hermann desired to marry Princess Marie Bonaparte, a great heiress; he might have succeeded but for his unsavory reputation. Though there was a chance he would succeed to the Grand Ducal throne, Marie's father disliked Hermann for possessing an "evil" reputation, and consequently allowed her instead to marry Prince George of Greece and Denmark. Before her refusal, however, Hermann was able to obtain a great deal of money, as it was assumed he would soon have a great deal of wealth to spend; when it became clear there was to be no marriage, a "crash" came. It was these money troubles, along with other problems, that led to his disinheritance.

Despite being disinherited, Hermann openly boasted he would travel to the United States in search of a wealthy wife, and then return to Germany and pay off his debts within a year; all this was said while staying in Zurich awaiting funds from his family. Instead, Hermann, now Count von Ostheim, morganatically married Wanda Paola Lottero, an Italian stage actress, on 5 September 1909 in London. She was the daughter of Gian Baptiste Lottero and his wife, Emilia di Montarana, dei Baroni Sarchi, member of a minor Italian nobility. They visited the United States on several occasions. They were divorced two years later, on 22 June 1911 after Wanda grew tired of supporting him with her earnings and divorced him on the grounds of financial "non-support", "cruelty", and "infidelity". Wanda later gained notoriety for having a short-lived affair with King Konstantínos I of the Hellenes in 1912.

On 4 August 1918, Hermann married secondly to Suzanne Aagot Midling at Heidelberg. They had one surviving child before her death on 16 October 1931:

- Alexander Kyrill Graf von Ostheim (born 7 August 1922); he died unmarried in Stockholm on 28 March 1943

On 16 November 1932, Hermann's engagement with Isabel Neilson, daughter of former British MP and prominent actor and author Francis Neilson, was announced. Hermann and Isabel were married civilly and religiously in Paris on 28 November 1932. A small family luncheon accompanied the wedding; afterwards, the couple honeymooned to Spain and North Africa. They had no children.

Hermann died in London on 6 June 1964 at the age of 78.

== Ancestry ==
Ancestors of Prince Hermann of Saxe-Weimar-Eisenach (1886–1964)

8. Prince Bernhard of Saxe-Weimar-Eisenach
4. Prince Hermann of Saxe-Weimar-Eisenach
9. Princess Ida of Saxe-Meiningen
2. Prince William of Saxe-Weimar-Eisenach
10. William I of Württemberg
5. Princess Augusta of Württemberg
11. Princess Pauline Therese of Württemberg
1. Prince Hermann of Saxe-Weimar-Eisenach
12. Adolf II, Count of Ysenburg and Büdingen in Wächtersbach
6. Ferdinand Maximilian III, Prince of Ysenburg and Büdingen
13. Countess Philippine of Ysenburg and Büdingen in Philippseich
3. Princess Gerta of Ysenburg and Büdingen
14. Frederick William, Elector of Hesse
7. Princess Auguste Marie Gertrude of Hanau and Horowitz
15. Gertrude Falkenstein, Princess of Hanau
