= Prince Wilhelm of Saxe-Weimar-Eisenach =

Prince Wilhelm
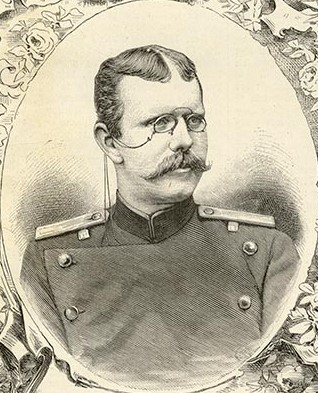
- Wilhelm in 1898
- Born: 21 December 1853; Stuttgart, Kingdom of Württemberg
- Died: 15 December 1924 (aged 70); Baden-Baden, Germany
- Spouse: Princess Gerta of Ysenburg and Büdingen zu Wächtersbach
- Issue: Prince Hermann; Prince Albrecht Wilhelm; Princess Sophie
Names
- German: Wilhelm Karl Bernhard Hermann Prinz von Sachsen-Weimar-Eisenach
- House: House of Saxe-Weimar-Eisenach
- Father: Prince Hermann of Saxe-Weimar-Eisenach
- Mother: Princess Augusta of Württemberg

Coat of arms of the Grand Duchy of Saxe-Weimar-Eisenach

Prince Wilhelm Karl Bernhard Hermann of Saxe-Weimar-Eisenach (21 December 1853 – 15 December 1924) was a member of the House of Saxe-Weimar-Eisenach, a collateral branch of an ancient House of Wettin.

== Life ==
Prince Wilhelm of Saxe-Weimar-Eisenach was born on 21 December 1853 in Stuttgart. He was the eldest son of the Prince Hermann of Saxe-Weimar-Eisenach and his wife, Princess Augusta of Württemberg (1826–1898).

Prince Wilhelm also has had his own financial problems, and has been forced by the Grand Duke to live outside Weimar. Wilhelm was heir presumptive to the throne as the young Grand Duke Wilhelm Ernst was a widower. Wilhelm Ernest's wife, Princess Karoline Reuss of Greiz died on 17 January 1905, eighteen months after their marriage, under mysterious circumstances.

Prince William had a problem with his eldest son. Prince Hermann morganatically married Wanda Paola Lottero (1881–1963) on 5 September 1909 in London. Lottero was an Italian stage actress, and due to Hermann's rollicking lifestyle, the ducal family forced him to renounce his rights of succession to the Saxe-Weimar-Eisenach throne, as well as his royal status, title and prerogatives, granting him a lesser, noble title, Count von Ostheim, along with a small allowance on the grounds that he stay out of the duchy. Prince Wilhelm also had a bad reputation. His behavior aroused the dissatisfaction of the head of the family. Prince Wilhelm fled to the United States in his youth, served as a riding master, clerk, book agent and even as a restaurant waiter in New York City, but was finally persuaded to return to Germany, marry his second cousin, and live on a small pension from the head of the house.

== Marriage and family ==
Prince Wilhelm married Princess Gerta Auguste of Ysenburg and Büdingen zu Wächtersbach (1863–1945), younger daughter of Ferdinand Maximilian I, Prince of Ysenburg and Büdingen (1824–1903), and Princess Auguste Marie Gertrude of Hanau and Horowitz (1829–1887), on 11 April 1885 at Wächtersbach, Germany. Augusta Marie Gertrude was the daughter of Frederick William, Elector of Hesse. They had three children, two sons and one daughter:

- Prince Hermann of Saxe-Weimar-Eisenach (14 February 1886 – 6 June 1964)
- Prince Albrecht of Sachsen-Weimar-Eisenach (23 December 1886 - 9 September 1918), killed in action during World War I
- Princess Sophie of Saxe-Weimar-Eisenach (25 July 1888 - 18 September 1913)

== Honours and arms ==
During his life, Prince Wilhelm of Saxe-Weimar and Eisenach received the following orders and decorations:

- Saxe-Weimar-Eisenach: Grand Cross of the White Falcon, 1853
- (Saxe-Coburg and Gotha) (Duchy of Saxe-Altenburg) (Saxe-Meiningen) Ernestine duchies: Grand Cross of the Saxe-Ernestine House Order, 1878
- Schaumburg-Lippe: Cross of Honour of the House Order of Lippe, 1st Class
- (Thailand) Siam: Grand Cross of the White Elephant
- Württemberg: Grand Cross of the Württemberg Crown, 1871

== Ancestry ==
Ancestors of Prince Wilhelm of Saxe-Weimar-Eisenach

16. Ernest Augustus II, Duke of Saxe-Weimar-Eisenach
8. Karl August, Grand Duke of Saxe-Weimar-Eisenach
17. Duchess Anna Amalia of Brunswick-Wolfenbüttel
4. Prince Bernhard of Saxe-Weimar-Eisenach
18. Louis IX, Landgrave of Hesse-Darmstadt
9. Landgravine Louise of Hesse-Darmstadt
19. Countess Palatine Caroline of Zweibrücken
2. Prince Hermann of Saxe-Weimar-Eisenach
20. Anton Ulrich, Duke of Saxe-Meiningen
10. Georg I, Duke of Saxe-Meiningen
21. Princess Charlotte Amalie of Hesse-Philippsthal
5. Princess Ida of Saxe-Meiningen
22. Christian Albrecht, Prince of Hohenlohe-Langenburg
11. Princess Louise Eleonore of Hohenlohe-Langenburg
23. Caroline of Stolberg-Gedern
1. Prince Wilhelm of Saxe-Weimar-Eisenach
24. Frederick II Eugene, Duke of Württemberg (= 28)
12. Frederick I of Württemberg
25. Margravine Friederike of Brandenburg-Schwedt (= 29)
6. William I of Württemberg
26. Charles William Ferdinand, Duke of Brunswick-Wolfenbüttel
13. Duchess Augusta of Brunswick-Wolfenbüttel
27. Princess Augusta of Great Britain
3. Princess Augusta of Württemberg
28. Frederick II Eugene, Duke of Württemberg (= 24)
14. Duke Louis of Württemberg
29. Margravine Friederike of Brandenburg-Schwedt (= 25)
7. Princess Pauline Therese of Württemberg
30. Charles Christian, Prince of Nassau-Weilburg
15. Princess Henriette of Nassau-Weilburg
31. Princess Carolina of Orange-Nassau
