= Order of the White Falcon =

House Order of the White Falcon (Hausorden vom Weißen Falken)
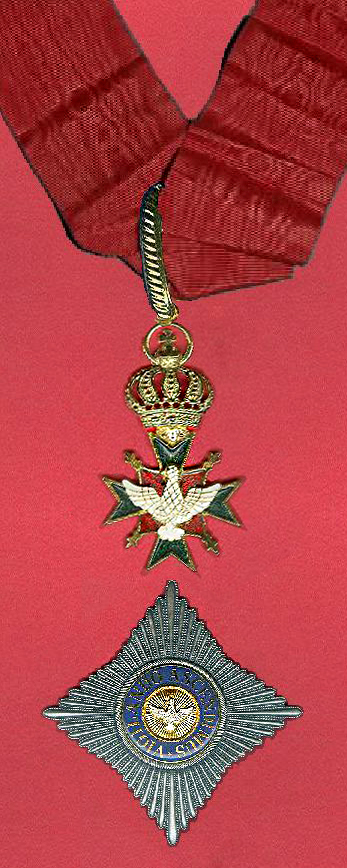
- Commander of the Order of the White Falcon
- Type: House order
- Presented by: the Duchy of Saxe-Weimar; Grand Duchy of Saxe-Weimar-Eisenach
- Motto: VIGILANDO ASCENDIMUS
- Status: No longer awarded
- Established: 2 August 1732
- Ribbon of the order

Order of the White Falcon (German: Hausorden vom Weißen Falken) is a grand-ducal order of the Grand Duchy of Saxe-Weimar-Eisenach, founded by Duke Ernest Augustus on 2 August 1732, and renewed in 1815 by Charles Augustus.

== Description ==
In the early 20th century it had four classes and a silver cross, added in 1878. The decoration, a green star of eight points, with red stars between the arms, bears a white falcon, and the motto, Vigilando Ascendimus (Through vigilance we ascend), on a blue ground.

Recipients
- Abdul Hamid II
- Prince Adalbert of Prussia (1811–1873)
- Prince Adalbert of Prussia (1884–1948)
- Prince Adolf of Schaumburg-Lippe
- Duke Adolf Friedrich of Mecklenburg
- Adolphe, Grand Duke of Luxembourg
- Prince Albert of Prussia (1809–1872)
- Prince Albert of Saxe-Altenburg
- Albert of Saxony
- Prince Albert of Saxony (1875–1900)
- Archduke Albrecht, Duke of Teschen
- Prince Albert Victor, Duke of Clarence and Avondale
- Albert, Prince Consort
- Prince Albert of Prussia (1837–1906)
- Albert, Prince of Schwarzburg-Rudolstadt
- Alexander I of Russia
- Alexander II of Russia
- Alexander III of Russia
- Alexander Frederick, Landgrave of Hesse
- Alexander of Battenberg
- Prince Alexander of Hesse and by Rhine
- Alexander, Prince of Orange
- Grand Duke Alexei Alexandrovich of Russia
- Alexis, Landgrave of Hesse-Philippsthal-Barchfeld
- Alfred, Duke of Saxe-Coburg and Gotha
- Alfred, Hereditary Prince of Saxe-Coburg and Gotha
- Alfred, 2nd Prince of Montenuovo
- Prince Alfons of Bavaria
- Alfonso XII
- Prince Arnulf of Bavaria
- Augustus, Grand Duke of Oldenburg
- Maximilian de Beauharnais, 3rd Duke of Leuchtenberg
- Prince Oscar Bernadotte
- Bernhard II, Duke of Saxe-Meiningen
- Bernhard III, Duke of Saxe-Meiningen
- Prince Bernhard of Saxe-Weimar-Eisenach (1792–1862)
- Theobald von Bethmann Hollweg
- Otto von Bismarck
- Hans von Boineburg-Lengsfeld
- Bernhard von Bülow
- Bruno, Prince of Ysenburg and Büdingen
- Prince Carl, Duke of Västergötland
- Carlos I of Portugal
- Carol I of Romania
- Princess Caroline Reuss of Greiz
- Charles I of Württemberg
- Charles Alexander, Grand Duke of Saxe-Weimar-Eisenach
- Charles Augustus, Hereditary Grand Duke of Saxe-Weimar-Eisenach (1844–1894)
- Charles Frederick, Grand Duke of Saxe-Weimar-Eisenach
- Charles Gonthier, Prince of Schwarzburg-Sondershausen
- Charles Michael, Duke of Mecklenburg
- Prince Charles of Prussia
- Prince Robert, Duke of Chartres
- Chlodwig, Prince of Hohenlohe-Schillingsfürst
- Christian IX of Denmark
- Christian X of Denmark
- Constantine I of Greece
- Karl Ludwig d'Elsa
- Grand Duke Dmitry Konstantinovich of Russia
- Walter Dornberger
- Eduard, Duke of Anhalt
- Edward VII
- Prince Edward of Saxe-Weimar
- Ernest I, Duke of Saxe-Coburg and Gotha
- Ernest II, Duke of Saxe-Coburg and Gotha
- Ernest Louis, Grand Duke of Hesse
- Ernst I, Duke of Saxe-Altenburg
- Ernst Gunther, Duke of Schleswig-Holstein
- Ernst II, Duke of Saxe-Altenburg
- Archduke Eugen of Austria
- Prince Eugen, Duke of Närke
- Ferdinand I of Austria
- Ferdinand IV, Grand Duke of Tuscany
- Archduke Ferdinand Karl of Austria
- Otto-Wilhelm Förster
- Archduke Franz Ferdinand of Austria
- Franz Joseph I of Austria
- Frederick VIII of Denmark
- Frederick Augustus II, Grand Duke of Oldenburg
- Frederick Augustus III of Saxony
- Prince Frederick Charles of Hesse
- Frederick Francis II, Grand Duke of Mecklenburg-Schwerin
- Frederick Francis III, Grand Duke of Mecklenburg-Schwerin
- Frederick Francis IV, Grand Duke of Mecklenburg-Schwerin
- Frederick I, Duke of Anhalt
- Frederick I, Grand Duke of Baden
- Frederick II, Grand Duke of Baden
- Frederick III, German Emperor
- Prince Frederick of Hohenzollern-Sigmaringen
- Frederick William III of Prussia
- Frederick William IV of Prussia
- Frederick, Duke of Saxe-Altenburg
- Prince Friedrich of Saxe-Meiningen
- Prince Friedrich Karl of Prussia (1828–1885)
- Prince Friedrich Leopold of Prussia
- Archduke Friedrich, Duke of Teschen
- Joseph Geefs
- Georg, Crown Prince of Saxony
- Georg II, Duke of Saxe-Meiningen
- Duke Georg Alexander of Mecklenburg-Strelitz
- Duke Georg August of Mecklenburg-Strelitz
- Georg, Duke of Saxe-Altenburg
- Georg, Prince of Schaumburg-Lippe
- George I of Greece
- George V of Hanover
- George V
- Prince George of Prussia
- George, King of Saxony
- George Victor, Prince of Waldeck and Pyrmont
- Erich von Gündell
- Günther Friedrich Karl II, Prince of Schwarzburg-Sondershausen
- Günther Victor, Prince of Schwarzburg
- Gustaf V
- Gottlieb Graf von Haeseler
- Alexander von Hartmann
- Heinrich XIV, Prince Reuss Younger Line
- Heinrich XXVII, Prince Reuss Younger Line
- Heinrich LXVII, Prince Reuss Younger Line
- Prince Henry of Prussia (1862–1929)
- Heinrich VII, Prince Reuss of Köstritz
- Gotthard Heinrici
- Duke Henry of Mecklenburg-Schwerin
- Prince Henry of the Netherlands (1820–1879)
- Prince Hermann of Saxe-Weimar-Eisenach (1825–1901)
- Prince Hermann of Saxe-Weimar-Eisenach (1886–1964)
- Walter von Hippel
- Franz von Hipper
- Henning von Holtzendorff
- Friedrich von Ingenohl
- Isabella II of Spain
- Ito Hirobumi
- Prince Johann Georg of Saxony
- Duke John Albert of Mecklenburg
- Archduke Joseph Karl of Austria
- Joseph, Duke of Saxe-Altenburg
- Prince Karl Anton of Hohenzollern
- Karl Anton, Prince of Hohenzollern
- Archduke Karl Ludwig of Austria
- Leonhard Kaupisch
- Mortimer von Kessel
- Hans von Kirchbach
- Grand Duke Kirill Vladimirovich of Russia
- Otto von Knobelsdorff
- Hans von Koester
- Grand Duke Konstantin Nikolayevich of Russia
- Konstantin of Hohenlohe-Schillingsfürst
- Julius Kühn
- Maximilian von Laffert
- Paul Laux
- Leopold I of Belgium
- Leopold II of Belgium
- Prince Leopold of Bavaria
- Leopold, Prince of Hohenzollern
- Karl Max, Prince Lichnowsky
- Fritz von Loßberg
- Louis III, Grand Duke of Hesse
- Erich Lüdke
- Ludwig II of Bavaria
- Ludwig III of Bavaria
- Prince Ludwig Ferdinand of Bavaria
- Archduke Ludwig Viktor of Austria
- Ludwig Wilhelm, Prince of Bentheim and Steinfurt
- Luís I of Portugal
- Luitpold, Prince Regent of Bavaria
- Georg von der Marwitz
- Prince Maximilian of Baden
- Prince Maximilian of Saxony (1870–1951)
- Maximilian II of Bavaria
- Emperor Meiji
- Klemens von Metternich
- Grand Duke Michael Nikolaevich of Russia
- Grand Duke Michael Alexandrovich of Russia
- Milan I of Serbia
- Helmuth von Moltke the Elder
- Curt von Morgen
- Prince Moritz of Saxe-Altenburg
- Karl Freiherr von Müffling
- Napoleon III
- Nicholas I of Russia
- Nicholas II of Russia
- Grand Duke Nicholas Konstantinovich of Russia
- Grand Duke Nicholas Nikolaevich of Russia (1831–1891)
- August Ludwig von Nostitz
- Alexey Fyodorovich Orlov
- Oscar II
- Archduke Otto of Austria (1865–1906)
- Otto of Greece
- Duke Paul Frederick of Mecklenburg
- Paul Frederick, Grand Duke of Mecklenburg-Schwerin
- Pedro II of Brazil
- Pedro V of Portugal
- Peter II, Grand Duke of Oldenburg
- Duke Peter of Oldenburg
- Prince Philippe, Count of Paris
- Prince Philippe, Count of Flanders
- Karl von Plettenberg
- Hugo von Pohl
- Prince Frederick William of Hesse-Kassel
- Prince Friedrich Wilhelm of Prussia
- Archduke Rainer Ferdinand of Austria
- Hubert von Rebeur-Paschwitz
- Duke Robert of Württemberg
- Prince Rudolf of Liechtenstein
- Rudolf, Crown Prince of Austria
- Eberhard Graf von Schmettow
- Ludwig von Schorn
- Grand Duke Sergei Alexandrovich of Russia
- Wilhelm Souchon
- Archduke Stephen of Austria (Palatine of Hungary)
- Alfred von Tirpitz
- Umberto I of Italy
- Walter von Unruh
- Victor Emmanuel III of Italy
- Viktor II, Duke of Ratibor
- Grand Duke Vladimir Alexandrovich of Russia
- Illarion Vorontsov-Dashkov
- Wilhelm II, German Emperor
- Wilhelm Karl, Duke of Urach
- Prince Wilhelm of Prussia (1783–1851)
- Prince Wilhelm of Saxe-Weimar-Eisenach
- William I of the Netherlands
- William I of Württemberg
- William I, German Emperor
- William II of the Netherlands
- William II of Württemberg
- William III of the Netherlands
- William Ernest, Grand Duke of Saxe-Weimar-Eisenach
- William IV, Grand Duke of Luxembourg
- Prince William of Baden (1829–1897)
- William, Duke of Brunswick
- William, Prince of Hohenzollern
- William, Prince of Wied
- Ferdinand von Zeppelin
