= Princess Sophie of Saxe-Weimar-Eisenach =

Princess Sophie of Saxe-Weimar-Eisenach may refer to:

- Princess Sophie of the Netherlands (1824–1897), wife of Charles Alexander, Grand Duke of Saxe-Weimar-Eisenach
- Princess Sophie of Saxe-Weimar-Eisenach (1888–1913), daughter of Prince William of Saxe-Weimar-Eisenach (noteworthy for her suicide)
- Princess Sophie of Saxe-Weimar-Eisenach (1911–1988), daughter of William Ernest, Grand Duke of Saxe-Weimar-Eisenach
