= Princess Edward =

Princess Edward may refer to:

- Princess Victoria of Saxe-Coburg-Saalfeld (1786–1861), wife of Prince Edward, Duke of Kent and Strathearn
- Augusta Katherine Gordon-Lennox (1827–1902), wife of Prince Edward of Saxe-Weimar
- Katharine, Duchess of Kent (born 1933), wife of Prince Edward, Duchess of Kent
- Sophie, Duchess of Edinburgh (born 1965), wife of Prince Edward, Duke of Edinburgh
