= William Ernest, Grand Duke of Saxe-Weimar-Eisenach =

Grand Duke of Saxe-Weimar-Eisenach from 1901 to 1918

William Ernest
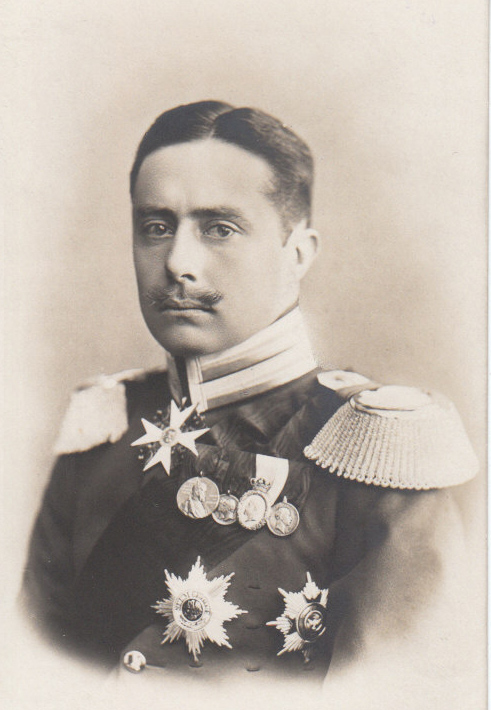
- William Ernest in 1906

Grand Duke of Saxe-Weimar-Eisenach
- Reign: 5 January 1901 – 9 November 1918
- Predecessor: Charles Alexander
- Successor: Grand duchy abolished
- Born: 10 June 1876; Weimar, Saxe-Weimar-Eisenach, German Empire
- Died: 24 April 1923 (aged 46); Henryków, Prussia, Weimar Republic
- Spouses: Princess Caroline Reuss of Greiz (m. 1903; died 1905) Princess Feodora of Saxe-Meiningen (m. 1910)
- Issue: Sophie, Princess of Schwarzburg; Charles Augustus, Hereditary Grand Duke of Saxe-Weimar-Eisenach; Prince Bernhard; Prince Georg
Names
- Wilhelm Ernst Karl Alexander Friedrich Heinrich Bernhard Albert Georg Hermann
- House: House of Saxe-Weimar-Eisenach
- Father: Charles Augustus, Hereditary Grand Duke of Saxe-Weimar-Eisenach
- Mother: Princess Pauline of Saxe-Weimar-Eisenach
- Religion: Lutheranism

William Ernest (Wilhelm Ernst Karl Alexander Friedrich Heinrich Bernhard Albert Georg Hermann, English: William Ernest Charles Alexander Frederick Henry Bernard Albert George Herman; 10 June 1876 – 24 April 1923) was the last grand duke of Saxe-Weimar-Eisenach.

== Biography ==
He was born in Weimar, the eldest son of Karl August of Saxe-Weimar-Eisenach, heir to the Grand Duke, and his wife Princess Pauline of Saxe-Weimar-Eisenach.

He succeeded his grandfather Karl Alexander as Grand Duke on 5 January 1901, as his father had predeceased him.

His heir was a distant cousin, Prince Hermann of Saxe-Weimar-Eisenach, until his disinheritance in 1909. Hermann's younger brother subsequently served as heir presumptive to the Grand Duchy of Saxe-Weimar-Eisenach until the birth of William Ernest's eldest son.

Wilhelm Ernst created the new Weimar town centre under the direction of Hans Olde, Henry van de Velde, and Adolf Brütt. He also had the University of Jena rebuilt by Theodor Fischer and also reconstructed Weimar's theatres. The improvements to the city included a marble statue of his predecessor Charles Alexander, which was completed in 1911. It was placed in a setting designed by Brütt. The placement of the setting was designed to distinguish the "old town" from the newly built area. A preservation law for the "old town" barred it to the Art Nouveau-style which was used in the new area.

== The Dutch throne ==
According to the Dutch constitution, Wilhelm Ernst was in line for the throne of the Netherlands (as the grandson of Princess Sophie of the Netherlands) after Queen Wilhelmina. At the beginning of the 20th century, the Dutch feared the possibility of German influence or even annexation of the Netherlands. In order to prevent this, some lawyers tried to change the constitution to exclude Wilhelm Ernst from the succession. Another proposal, however, was this: if Wilhelmina would die childless, then he or his offspring would have to choose between the Dutch and the Weimar throne. The birth of Wilhelmina's daughter Juliana in 1909 lessened the chance for any member of the House of Wettin (Saxe-Weimar-Eisenach branch) to inherit the Dutch throne. With the amendment to the constitution of 1922, which restricted the right of succession to the offspring of Wilhelmina, the possibility disappeared entirely.

== Abdication ==
On 9 November 1918, Grand Duke Wilhelm Ernst - along with the rest of the German monarchs following the defeat of Germany in World War I - was forced to abdicate. His throne and all his lands were relinquished and he fled with his family to the family estate in Silesia, where he died five years later.

Despite all his work for Weimar during his government, Wilhelm Ernst was a hated ruler. This was for his private life, where he was known to be a sadist; the day of his abdication, he was called the "most unpopular prince in all Germany".

He died in Heinrichau in Silesia.

== Marriages ==
In Bückeburg on 30 April 1903, Wilhelm Ernst married first to Princess Caroline Reuss of Greiz, daughter of Prince Heinrich XXII Reuss of Greiz. This marriage was childless and ended in 1905 with the death of Caroline under mysterious circumstances. The official cause of death was pneumonia following influenza; other sources have suggested suicide.

In Meiningen on 21 January 1910, Wilhelm Ernst married second to Princess Feodora of Saxe-Meiningen, daughter of Prince Friedrich Johann of Saxe-Meinigen.

== Issue ==
Name	Birth	Death	Notes
Princess Sophia of Saxe-Weimar-Eisenach	20 March 1911	21 November 1988	married Friedrich Günther, Prince of Schwarzburg; the marriage ended in divorce less than a year later. They had no issue.
Karl August, Hereditary Grand Duke of Saxe-Weimar-Eisenach	28 July 1912	14 October 1988	married Baroness Elisabeth of Wangenheim-Winterstein; had issue.
Prince Bernhard of Saxe-Weimar-Eisenach	3 March 1917	23 March 1986	married Princess Felicitas of Salm-Horstmar (1920-2021). Their daughter Katharina Feodora Adelheid Sabine Sophie Felicitas Sieglinde, Princess of Saxe-Weimar-Eisenach (born 30 November 1943) married Prince Emanuel Joseph von Hohenzollern-Emden, son of Franz Joseph, Prince of Hohenzollern-Emden, on 25 May 1968 (divorced in 1985).
Prince Georg of Saxe-Weimar-Eisenach	24 November 1921	11 March 2011	changed name for Jörg Brena in 1953 and renounced his succession rights.

== Honours ==
He received the following orders and decorations:

- Saxe-Weimar-Eisenach: Grand Cross of the White Falcon, 1894; Grand Master, 5 January 1901
- (Saxe-Coburg and Gotha) (Duchy of Saxe-Altenburg) (Saxe-Meiningen) Ernestine duchies: Grand Cross of the Saxe-Ernestine House Order
- Kingdom of Saxony: Knight of the Rue Crown, 1898
- Duchy of Anhalt: Grand Cross of the Order of Albert the Bear
- Baden: Knight of the House Order of Fidelity, 1901
- Kingdom of Bavaria: Knight of St. Hubert, 1901
- Brunswick: Grand Cross of the Order of Henry the Lion, 1902
- Grand Duchy of Hesse: Grand Cross of the Ludwig Order, 20 February 1902
- Principality of Lippe: Cross of Honour of the House Order of Lippe, 1st Class
- Mecklenburg: Grand Cross of the Wendish Crown
- Oldenburg: Grand Cross of the Order of Duke Peter Friedrich Ludwig, with Collar
- Kingdom of Prussia:
  - Knight of the Black Eagle, with Collar, 18 January 1897
  - Grand Commander's Cross of the Royal House Order of Hohenzollern
- Reuss: Cross of Honour, 1st Class with Crown
- Württemberg: Grand Cross of the Württemberg Crown, 1895
- (Austrian Empire) (Kingdom of Hungary) Austria-Hungary: Grand Cross of the Royal Hungarian Order of St. Stephen, 1901
- Principality of Bulgaria: Grand Cross of St. Alexander
- Netherlands:
  - Grand Cross of the Netherlands Lion
  - Grand Cross of the Order of Orange-Nassau
- Russian Empire:
  - Knight of St. Andrew, 1901
  - Knight of St. Alexander Nevsky, 1901
- Sweden-Norway: Knight of the Seraphim, 18 September 1897

== Ancestry ==
Ancestors of William Ernest, Grand Duke of Saxe-Weimar-Eisenach

8. Charles Frederick, Grand Duke of Saxe-Weimar-Eisenach
4. Charles Alexander, Grand Duke of Saxe-Weimar-Eisenach
9. Grand Duchess Maria Pavlovna of Russia
2. Charles Augustus, Hereditary Grand Duke of Saxe-Weimar-Eisenach
10. William II of the Netherlands
5. Princess Sophie of the Netherlands
11. Grand Duchess Anna Pavlovna of Russia
1. William Ernest, Grand Duke of Saxe-Weimar-Eisenach
12. Prince Bernhard of Saxe-Weimar-Eisenach
6. Prince Hermann of Saxe-Weimar-Eisenach
13. Princess Ida of Saxe-Meiningen
3. Princess Pauline of Saxe-Weimar-Eisenach
14. William I of Württemberg
7. Princess Augusta of Württemberg
15. Duchess Pauline Therese of Württemberg

William Ernest, Grand Duke of Saxe-Weimar-Eisenach House of Saxe-Weimar-Eisenach Cadet branch of the House of Wettin Born: 10 June 1876 Died: 24 April 1923
Regnal titles
Preceded by Charles Alexander	Grand Duke of Saxe-Weimar-Eisenach; 5 January 1901 – 9 November 1918	Grand Duchy abolished
Titles in pretence
Grand Duchy abolished	Grand Duke of Saxe-Weimar-Eisenach; 9 November 1918 – 24 April 1923	Succeeded by Charles August
