= Prince Edward of Saxe-Weimar =

British military officer (1823–1902)

Prince Edward
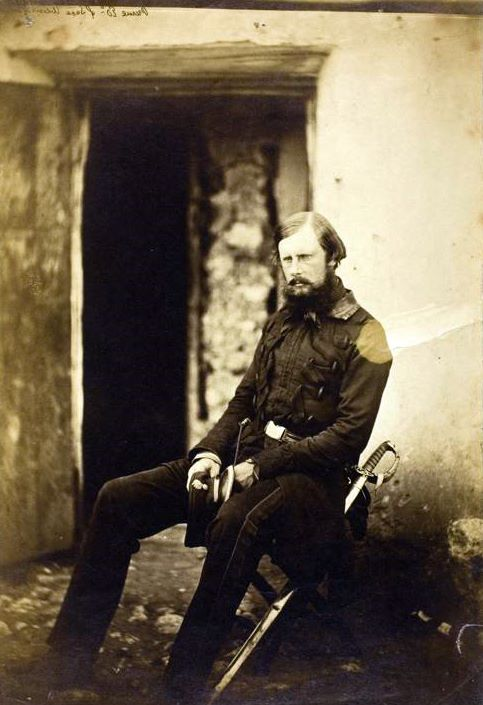
- Prince Edward in 1855
- Born: 11 October 1823; Bushy House, London
- Died: 16 November 1902 (aged 79); Portland Place, London
- Burial: Chichester Cathedral
- Spouse: Lady Augusta Katherine Gordon-Lennox (m. 1851)
Names
- William Augustus Edward
- House: Saxe-Weimar-Eisenach
- Father: Prince Bernhard of Saxe-Weimar-Eisenach
- Mother: Princess Ida of Saxe-Meiningen
- Occupation: Military officer

Prince William Augustus Edward of Saxe-Weimar-Eisenach, KP, GCB, GCH, GCVO, PC (Ire) (11 October 1823 – 16 November 1902) was a British military officer of German descent. After a career in the Grenadier Guards, he became major general commanding the Brigade of Guards and general officer commanding the Home District in 1870, general officer commanding Southern District in October 1878 and commander-in-chief, Ireland in October 1885. He was promoted to field marshal in 1897 despite his career including no great military achievements.

== Career ==
Edward was born to Prince Bernhard of Saxe-Weimar-Eisenach and Princess Ida of Saxe-Meiningen at Bushy House, the home of his mother's sister Adelaide and her husband the future William IV of the United Kingdom.

After being naturalised as a British subject, Edward's military career began on 1 June 1841, when, having trained at the Royal Military College, Sandhurst, he joined the 67th (South Hampshire) Regiment of Foot as an ensign. He was promoted to ensign in the Grenadier Guards and lieutenant in the Army on 8 June 1841 and lieutenant in his regiment and captain in the Army on 19 May 1846 before becoming adjutant of his battalion in November 1850.

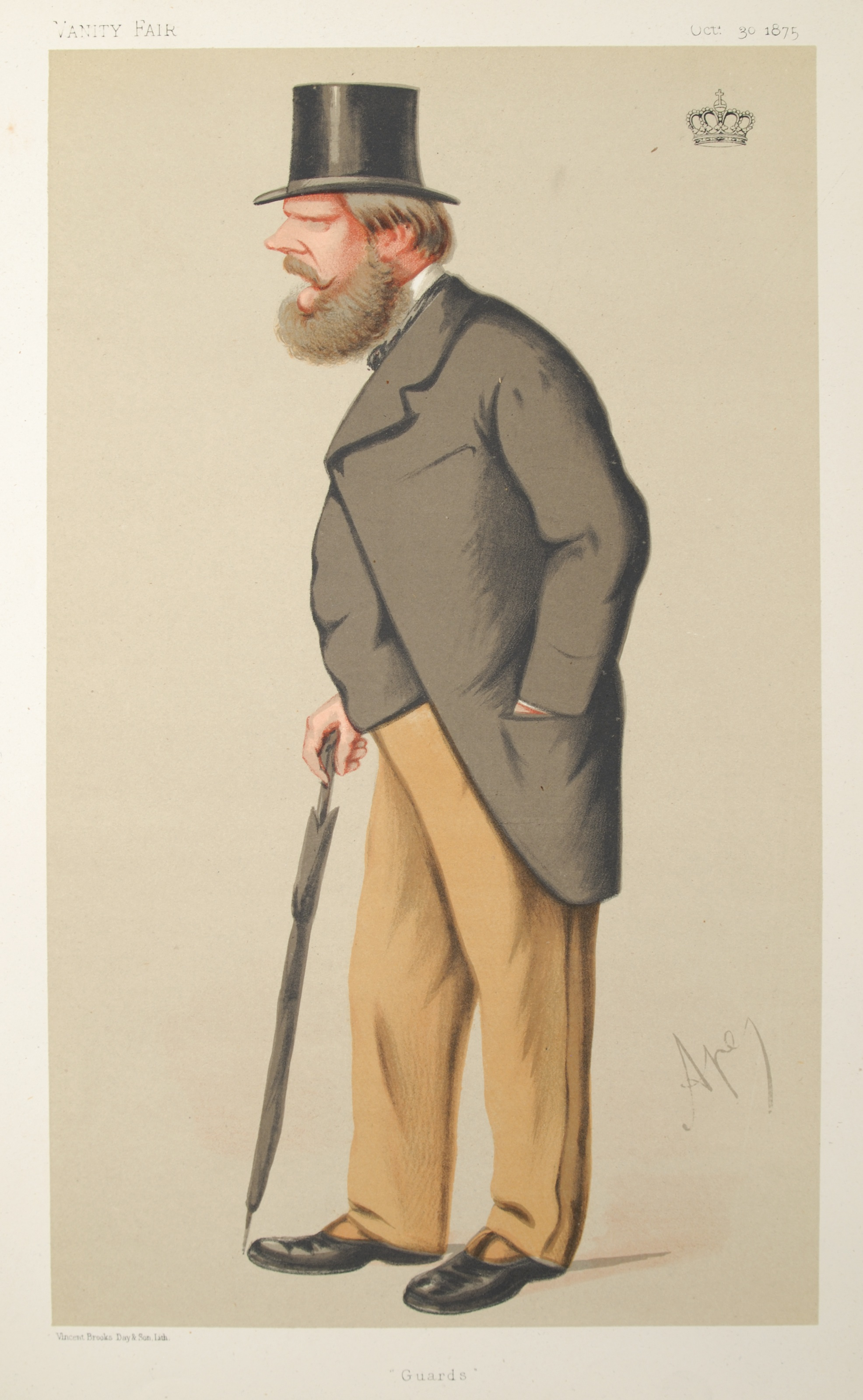
Prince Edward of Saxe-Weimar, aged 52, as depicted in Vanity Fair (1875)

Edward was promoted to brevet major in the Grenadier Guards on 20 June 1854. He served in the Crimean War and fought at the Battle of Alma in September 1854 and the Siege of Sevastopol in October 1854, where he was slightly injured. He fought on at the Battle of Balaclava in October 1854 and the Battle of Inkerman in November 1854. He was promoted to brevet lieutenant-colonel "for distinguished Service in the Field" during the war on 12 December 1854.

Edward was appointed an aide-de-camp to the Queen and received his colonelcy in the Grenadier Guards on 5 October 1855. Granted the style of Serene Highness (to both Edward and his wife) in 1866, he was promoted to major-general on 6 March 1868. He was appointed major general commanding the Brigade of Guards and general officer commanding the Home District in 1870 and, having been promoted to lieutenant general on 6 July 1877, he became General Officer Commanding Southern District in October 1878. Promoted to full general on 4 November 1879, he went on to be commander-in-chief, Ireland and a member of the Irish Privy Council in October 1885 before retiring in October 1890.

In retirement Edward was a commissioner of the Patriotic Fund. He also became colonel of the 10th Regiment of Foot and then colonel of the 1st Regiment of Life Guards. He was promoted to field marshal on 22 June 1897 following which there was adverse comment in The Times that his career had included no great military achievements.

Prince and Princess Edward had for several years a summer residence at North Berwick, and in October 1902 the Prince was honoured with the Freedom of the Royal burgh of North Berwick, a week after he had hosted King Edward VII as his guest there for a couple of days.

Edward died on 16 November 1902 at Portland Place in London and was buried in Chichester Cathedral, in the crypt of his wife's family, the dukes of Richmond and Lennox.

== Family ==
On 27 November 1851 Edward married, morganatically, Lady Augusta Katherine Gordon-Lennox, (a daughter of Charles Gordon-Lennox, 5th Duke of Richmond), who was created Countess of Dornburg by the Grand Duke of Saxe-Weimar the day before the wedding. The Court Circular shows that she was usually known by that title until early 1886, when the Circular began to consistently refer to her by her husband's title, i.e. "HSH Princess Edward of Saxe-Weimar". They had no children.

== Ancestry ==
Ancestors of Prince Edward of Saxe-Weimar

8. Ernest Augustus II, Duke of Saxe-Weimar-Eisenach
4. Charles Augustus, Grand Duke of Saxe-Weimar-Eisenach
9. Duchess Anna Amalia of Brunswick-Wolfenbüttel
2. Prince Bernhard of Saxe-Weimar-Eisenach
10. Louis IX, Landgrave of Hesse-Darmstadt
5. Princess Louise of Hesse-Darmstadt
11. Countess Palatine Caroline of Zweibrücken
1. Prince Edward of Saxe-Weimar
12. Anton Ulrich, Duke of Saxe-Meiningen
6. Georg I, Duke of Saxe-Meiningen
13. Princess Charlotte Amalie of Hesse-Philippsthal
3. Princess Ida of Saxe-Meiningen
14. Christian Albrecht, Prince of Hohenlohe-Langenburg
7. Princess Louise Eleonore of Hohenlohe-Langenburg
15. Princess Caroline of Stolberg-Gedern

== Honours ==
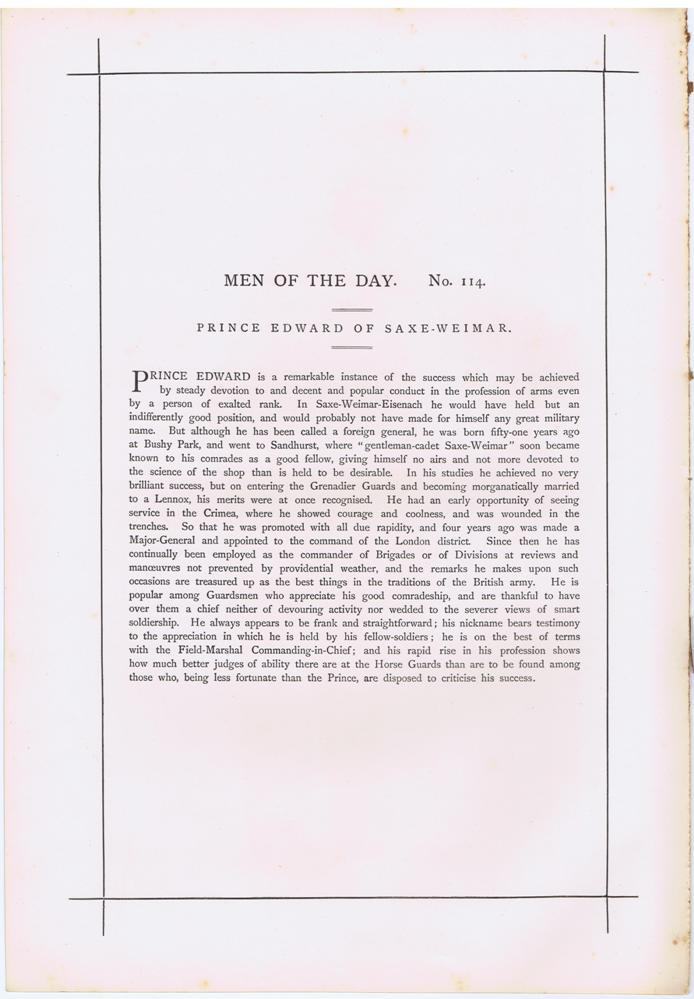
1875 Vanity Fair Print text bio of Prince Edward

Edward received the following orders and decorations:

- Saxe-Weimar-Eisenach: Grand Cross of the White Falcon, 20 November 1839
- (Saxe-Coburg and Gotha) (Duchy of Saxe-Altenburg) (Saxe-Meiningen) Ernestine duchies: Grand Cross of the Saxe-Ernestine House Order, November 1842
- Kingdom of Hanover: Grand Cross of the Royal Guelphic Order, 1849
- United Kingdom:
  - Crimea Medal, 1854
  - Companion of the Bath (military), 24 January 1857; Knight Commander, 24 May 1881; Knight Grand Cross, 21 June 1887
  - Knight of St. Patrick, 18 December 1890
  - Knight Grand Cross of the Royal Victorian Order, 8 March 1901
- French Empire: Knight of the Legion of Honour, 2 August 1856
- Ottoman Empire:
  - Crimean War Medal, 1856
  - Order of the Medjidie, 3rd Class, 2 March 1858
- Netherlands:
  - Grand Cross of the Military William Order, 7 April 1858
  - Grand Cross of the Netherlands Lion
- Mecklenburg: Grand Cross of the Wendish Crown, with Crown in Ore, 19 May 1867
- Kingdom of Prussia: Grand Cross of the Red Eagle, 8 September 1874
- Württemberg: Grand Cross of the Württemberg Crown, 1876
- Grand Duchy of Hesse: Grand Cross of the Ludwig Order, 9 July 1881

== Sources ==
- Heathcote, Tony (1999). The British Field Marshals 1736–1997. Leo Cooper. ISBN 0-85052-696-5.
- Shaw, Willam (2012). The Knights of England: a Complete Record from the Earliest Time to the Present Day. Forgotten Books. ISBN 9780806304434.

Military offices
Preceded by Sir Frederick Hamilton (as Major-General Commanding the Brigade of Guards)	GOC Home District; 1870–1876	Succeeded by Sir Frederick Stephenson
Preceded by Sir John Garvock	GOC Southern District; 1878–1884	Succeeded by Sir George Willis
Preceded by Sir Thomas Montagu Steele	Commander-in-Chief, Ireland; 1885–1890	Succeeded by The Viscount Wolseley
Preceded by Sir John Garvock	Colonel of the 10th (North Lincoln) Regiment of Foot; 1878–1888	Succeeded by Sir Henry Errington Longden
Preceded by The Earl of Lucan	Colonel of the 1st Regiment of Life Guards; 1888–1902	Succeeded by The Lord de Ros
New title	Colonel-in-Chief of the Lincolnshire Regiment; 1888–1902	None appointed
