= Princess Pauline of Saxe-Weimar-Eisenach =

Pauline of Saxe-Weimar-Eisenach
- Hereditary Grand Duchess of Saxe-Weimar-Eisenach
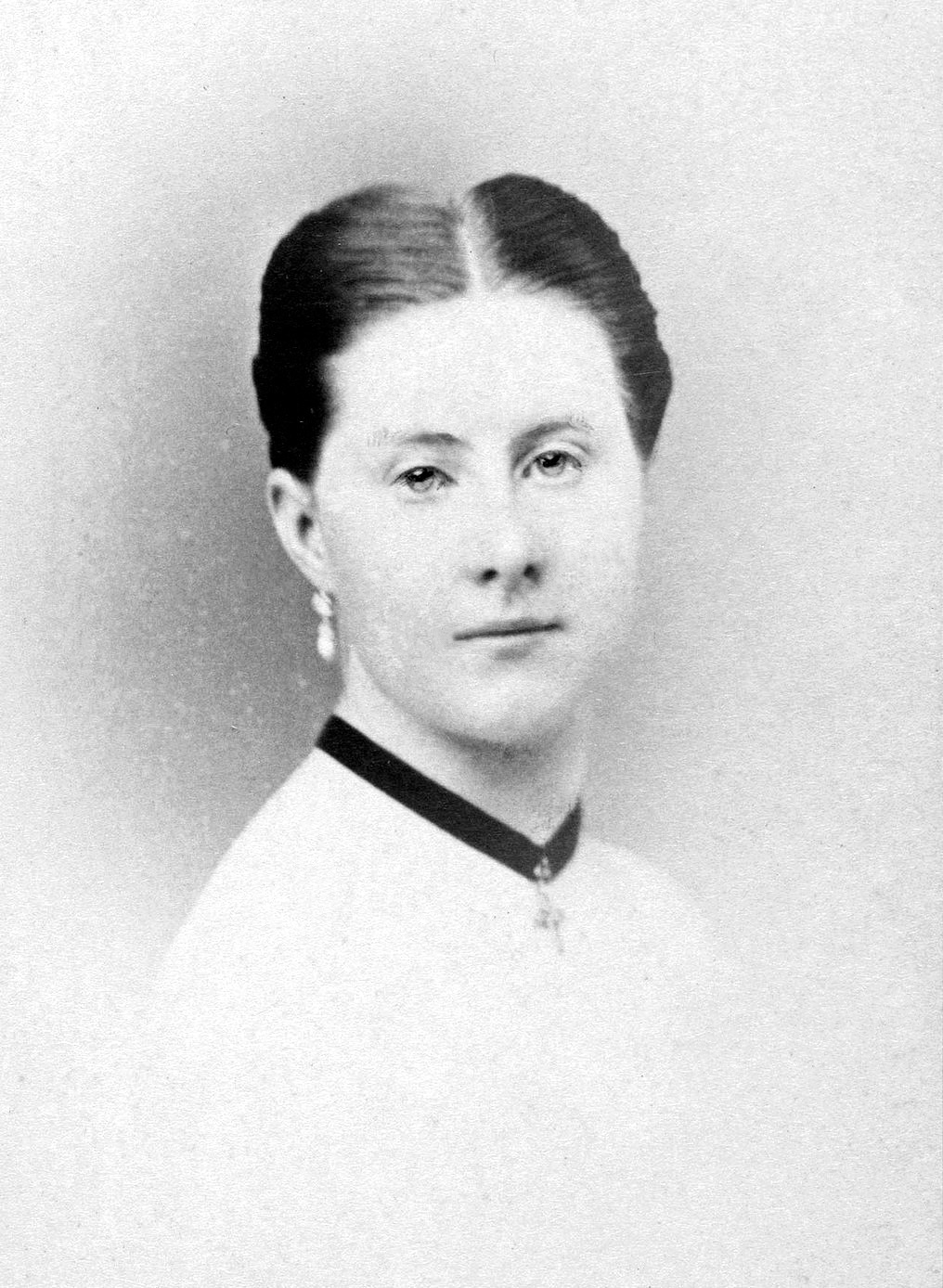
- Pauline in 1868
- Born: 25 July 1852; Stuttgart
- Died: 17 May 1904 (aged 51); Orte
- Spouse: Charles Augustus, Hereditary Grand Duke of Saxe-Weimar-Eisenach (m. 1873; died 1894)
- Issue: William Ernest, Grand Duke of Saxe-Weimar-Eisenach; Prince Bernhard
Names
- Pauline Ida Marie Olga Henriette Katherine
- House: Saxe-Weimar-Eisenach
- Father: Prince Hermann of Saxe-Weimar-Eisenach
- Mother: Princess Augusta of Württemberg

Princess Pauline of Saxe-Weimar-Eisenach (Pauline Ida Marie Olga Henriette Katherine; 25 July 1852 – 17 May 1904) was the wife of Charles Augustus, Hereditary Grand Duke of Saxe-Weimar-Eisenach.

== Early life ==
She was a daughter of Prince Hermann of Saxe-Weimar-Eisenach and his wife, Princess Augusta of Württemberg.

== Hereditary Grand Duchess ==
On 26 August 1873 at Friedrichshafen, Baden-Württemberg, Pauline married Charles Augustus, Hereditary Grand Duke of Saxe-Weimar-Eisenach. They were second cousins, as she was the paternal granddaughter of Prince Bernhard, younger brother of the Charles Frederick, Grand Duke of Saxe-Weimar-Eisenach, the grandfather of Karl August.

Pauline and Charles Augustus had two sons:

- Wilhelm Ernst Karl Alexander Friedrich Heinrich Bernhard Albert Georg Hermann, Grand Duke of Saxe-Weimar-Eisenach (Weimar, 10 June 1876 – Heinrichau, 24 April 1923); married firstly Princess Caroline Reuss of Greiz (no issue), and secondly Princess Feodora of Saxe-Meiningen (had issue).
- Prince Bernhard Karl Alexander Hermann Heinrich Wilhelm Oscar Friedrich Franz Peter (Weimar, 18 April 1878 – Weimar, 1 October 1900); died unmarried at the age of 22.

Charles Augustus died on 22 November 1894 of inflammation of the lungs, at the age of 51. He never succeeded as Grand Duke of Saxe-Weimar-Eisenach. Consequently, Pauline was always known as Hereditary Grand Duchess, or after his death, Dowager Hereditary Grand Duchess. Their elder son William Ernest succeeded as Grand Duke.

== Widowhood ==
In her final years, Pauline spent a lot of time in Italy, and was a frequent visitor to the Italian court. It was rumored that she entered into a morganatic marriage with her chamberlain. This marriage did not appear in the Almanach de Gotha, and was not approved by her son the Grand Duke. Consequently, the marriage was not sanctioned by the Saxe-Weimar government. She continued to be styled as Dowager Hereditary Grand Duchess only by courtesy, as she was unpopular with her family and her son's subjects.

Though she lived much of her widowhood away from the Saxe-Weimar court, Pauline "contributed even from a distance, to create the difficulties which rendered the position of her daughter-in-law, the present Grand Duchess, so extremely difficult during the first few months of marriage". She was described as "extraordinarily fat, and one of the most plain-featured princesses of Germany, her homeliness being of the crabbed and sour order rather than of a genial nature".

On 17 May 1904, Pauline died suddenly of heart disease while on a train en route from Rome to Florence. Her body was taken to Florence.

== Honours ==
- Russian Empire: Grand Cross of the Order of St. Catherine, in Diamonds
- Württemberg: Dame of the Order of Olga, 1871

== Ancestry ==
Ancestors of Princess Pauline of Saxe-Weimar-Eisenach

8. Karl August, Grand Duke of Saxe-Weimar-Eisenach
4. Prince Bernhard of Saxe-Weimar-Eisenach
9. Landgravine Louise of Hesse-Darmstadt
2. Prince Hermann of Saxe-Weimar-Eisenach
10. Georg I, Duke of Saxe-Meiningen
5. Princess Ida of Saxe-Meiningen
11. Princess Louise Eleonore of Hohenlohe-Langenburg
1. Princess Pauline of Saxe-Weimar-Eisenach
12. Frederick I of Württemberg
6. William I of Württemberg
13. Duchess Augusta of Brunswick-Wolfenbüttel
3. Princess Augusta of Württemberg
14. Duke Louis of Württemberg
7. Princess Pauline Therese of Württemberg
15. Princess Henriette of Nassau-Weilburg
