= Saxe-Ernestine House Order =

Order of Knighthood of the Ernestine Duchies

Saxe-Ernestine House Order Sachsen-Ernestinischer Hausorden
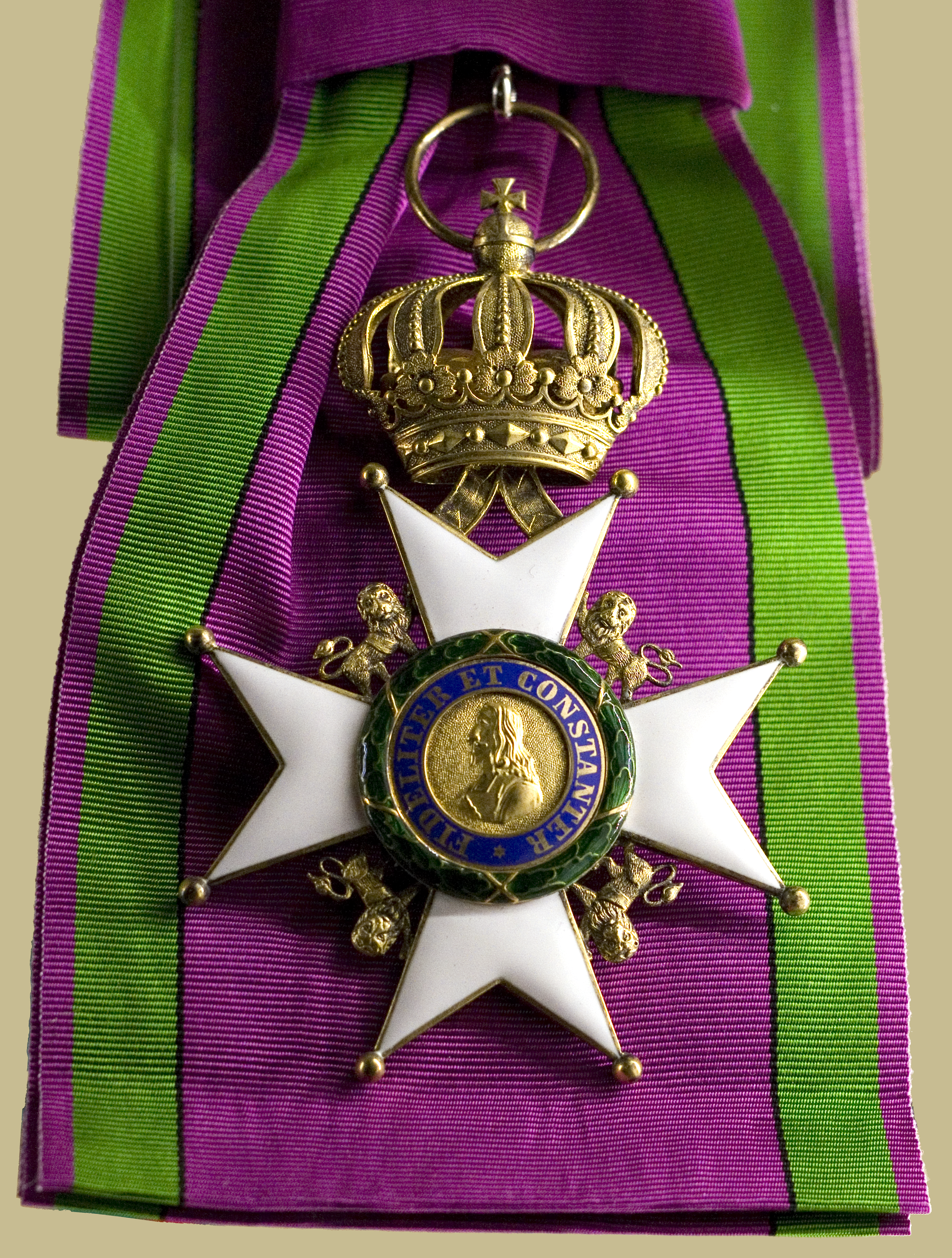
- Grand Cross sash with badge

Awarded by Saxe-Meiningen (Duchy of Saxe-Altenburg) Saxe-Altenburg (extinct 1991) Saxe-Coburg and Gotha
- Type: Dynastic Order
- Ribbon: Purple with narrow Green stripes on either side.
- Motto: Fideliter Et Constanter ("Faithful and Steadfast")
- Status: Currently constituted
- Sovereigns: Konrad, Prince of Saxe-Meiningen; Hubertus, Prince of Saxe-Coburg and Gotha
- Grades: Grand Cross; Grand Officer; Grand Commander; Commander; Officer; Knight/Dame; Medal

Precedence
- Next (higher): None
- Next (lower): None
- The ribbon of the order

The Saxe-Ernestine House Order (German: Sachsen-Ernestinischer Hausorden) was an order of merit instituted by Duke Friedrich of Saxe-Altenburg, Duke Ernst I of Saxe-Coburg-Gotha, and Duke Bernhard II of Saxe-Meiningen on 25 December 1833 as a joint award of the Saxon duchies.

== Classes ==
At first, the Order consisted of five classes: Grand Cross, Commander's Cross with Star in First and Second Classes, and Knight's Cross in First and Second Classes. Awards were reserved for officers.

In 1864, a silver-gilt medal was added but subsequently suppressed in 1918, at the end of World War I. Gold and silver medals were also associated with the Order.

Recipients

== Recipients ==
- Grand Crosses
  - Abbas II of Egypt
  - Prince Adalbert of Bavaria (1828–1875)
  - Prince Adalbert of Prussia (1884–1948)
  - Duke Adam of Württemberg
  - Prince Adolf of Schaumburg-Lippe
  - Adolphe, Grand Duke of Luxembourg
  - Adolphus Frederick VI, Grand Duke of Mecklenburg-Strelitz
  - Adolphus Frederick V, Grand Duke of Mecklenburg-Strelitz
  - Afonso, Duke of Porto
  - Albert I of Belgium
  - Albert, 8th Prince of Thurn and Taxis
  - Prince Albert of Prussia (1809–1872)
  - Prince Albert of Saxe-Altenburg
  - Albert of Saxony
  - Albert, Duke of Schleswig-Holstein
  - Prince Albert Victor, Duke of Clarence and Avondale
  - Albert, Prince Consort
  - Prince Albert of Prussia (1837–1906)
  - Albert, Prince of Schwarzburg-Rudolstadt
  - Prince Ferdinand, Duke of Alençon
  - Alexander II of Russia
  - Alexander III of Russia
  - Alexander of Battenberg
  - Prince Alexander of Prussia
  - Duke Alexander of Württemberg (1804–1881)
  - Duke Alexander of Württemberg (1804–1885)
  - Alexander Frederick, Landgrave of Hesse
  - Alexis, Landgrave of Hesse-Philippsthal-Barchfeld
  - Prince Alfons of Bavaria
  - Alfred, Duke of Saxe-Coburg and Gotha
  - Alfred, Hereditary Prince of Saxe-Coburg and Gotha
  - Alfred, 2nd Prince of Montenuovo
  - Grand Duke Andrei Vladimirovich of Russia
  - Infanta Antónia of Portugal
  - Aoki Shuzo
  - Prince Aribert of Anhalt
  - Prince Arnulf of Bavaria
  - Prince Arthur, Duke of Connaught and Strathearn
  - Prince August Leopold of Saxe-Coburg and Gotha
  - Prince August, Duke of Dalarna
  - Prince August of Württemberg
  - Prince August of Saxe-Coburg and Gotha
  - Infante Augusto, Duke of Coimbra
  - Abu Bakar of Johor
  - Carl Johan Bernadotte
  - Bernhard III, Duke of Saxe-Meiningen
  - Prince Bernhard of Saxe-Weimar-Eisenach (1792–1862)
  - Prince Bertil, Duke of Halland
  - Theobald von Bethmann Hollweg
  - Herbert von Bismarck
  - Otto von Bismarck
  - Boris III of Bulgaria
  - Bernhard von Bülow
  - Carl, 3rd Prince of Leiningen
  - Carl XVI Gustaf
  - Carlos I of Portugal
  - Carol I of Romania
  - Charles I of Württemberg
  - Charles XV
  - Charles Alexander, Grand Duke of Saxe-Weimar-Eisenach
  - Charles Augustus, Hereditary Grand Duke of Saxe-Weimar-Eisenach (1844–1894)
  - Charles Egon III, Prince of Fürstenberg
  - Charles Frederick, Grand Duke of Saxe-Weimar-Eisenach
  - Charles Michael, Duke of Mecklenburg
  - Prince Charles of Hesse and by Rhine
  - Prince Charles of Prussia
  - Archduke Charles Stephen of Austria
  - Chlodwig, Prince of Hohenlohe-Schillingsfürst
  - Chlodwig, Landgrave of Hesse-Philippsthal-Barchfeld
  - Christian IX of Denmark
  - Prince Christian of Schleswig-Holstein
  - Prince Christian Victor of Schleswig-Holstein
  - Duke Constantine Petrovich of Oldenburg
  - Henri de Brouckère
  - Felix de Muelenaere
  - Rudolf von Delbrück
  - Karl Ludwig d'Elsa
  - Edouard d'Huart
  - Prince Eduard of Saxe-Altenburg
  - Eduard, Duke of Anhalt
  - Edward VII
  - Prince Edward of Saxe-Weimar
  - Prince Eitel Friedrich of Prussia
  - Emich, Prince of Leiningen
  - Ernest II, Duke of Saxe-Coburg and Gotha
  - Ernest Augustus, King of Hanover
  - Prince Ernest Augustus, 3rd Duke of Cumberland and Teviotdale
  - Ernest Louis, Grand Duke of Hesse
  - Ernst I, Duke of Saxe-Altenburg
  - Ernst Gunther, Duke of Schleswig-Holstein
  - Ernst II, Duke of Saxe-Altenburg
  - Ernst Leopold, 4th Prince of Leiningen
  - Ernst, Prince of Saxe-Meiningen
  - Archduke Eugen of Austria
  - Prince Ferdinand of Bavaria
  - Ferdinand I of Austria
  - Ferdinand I of Bulgaria
  - Ferdinand I of Romania
  - Ferdinand II of Portugal
  - Prince Ferdinand of Saxe-Coburg and Gotha
  - Francis V, Duke of Modena
  - François d'Orléans, Prince of Joinville
  - Archduke Franz Ferdinand of Austria
  - Franz Joseph I of Austria
  - Archduke Franz Karl of Austria
  - Prince Franz of Bavaria
  - Archduke Franz Salvator of Austria
  - Frederick II, Grand Duke of Baden
  - Frederick VIII of Denmark
  - Frederick VIII, Duke of Schleswig-Holstein
  - Frederick Augustus II, Grand Duke of Oldenburg
  - Frederick Augustus II of Saxony
  - Frederick Augustus III of Saxony
  - Frederick Francis II, Grand Duke of Mecklenburg-Schwerin
  - Frederick Francis III, Grand Duke of Mecklenburg-Schwerin
  - Frederick Francis IV, Grand Duke of Mecklenburg-Schwerin
  - Frederick I, Duke of Anhalt
  - Frederick I, Grand Duke of Baden
  - Frederick III, German Emperor
  - Prince Frederick of Hohenzollern-Sigmaringen
  - Frederick, Prince of Hohenzollern
  - Prince Frederick of Württemberg
  - Frederick William III of Prussia
  - Frederick William IV of Prussia
  - Frederick William, Grand Duke of Mecklenburg-Strelitz
  - Friedrich II, Duke of Anhalt
  - Friedrich Ferdinand, Duke of Schleswig-Holstein
  - Friedrich Günther, Prince of Schwarzburg-Rudolstadt
  - Prince Friedrich of Saxe-Meiningen
  - Prince Friedrich Karl of Prussia (1828–1885)
  - Prince Friedrich Leopold of Prussia
  - Archduke Friedrich, Duke of Teschen
  - Charles Egon II, Prince of Fürstenberg
  - Gaston, Count of Eu
  - Georg II, Duke of Saxe-Meiningen
  - Georg, Prince of Saxe-Meiningen
  - Georg, Duke of Saxe-Altenburg
  - Prince Georg of Bavaria
  - Georg, Crown Prince of Saxony
  - Georg, Prince of Schaumburg-Lippe
  - Duke Georg Alexander of Mecklenburg-Strelitz
  - George I of Greece
  - George V of Hanover
  - George V
  - George Albert, Prince of Schwarzburg-Rudolstadt
  - Prince George of Prussia
  - George, King of Saxony
  - George Victor, Prince of Waldeck and Pyrmont
  - Auguste Goffinet
  - Colmar Freiherr von der Goltz
  - Günther Friedrich Karl II, Prince of Schwarzburg-Sondershausen
  - Gustaf V
  - Gustaf VI Adolf
  - Prince Gustaf Adolf, Duke of Västerbotten
  - Prince Gustav of Denmark
  - Otto von Habsburg
  - Wilhelm von Hahnke
  - Jakob von Hartmann
  - Hans Heinrich XV, Prince of Pless
  - Heinrich XIV, Prince Reuss Younger Line
  - Heinrich XXII, Prince Reuss of Greiz
  - Heinrich LXVII, Prince Reuss Younger Line
  - Prince Henry of Prussia (1862–1929)
  - Prince Heinrich of Bavaria
  - Heinrich VII, Prince Reuss of Köstritz
  - Henri d'Orléans, Duke of Aumale
  - Prince Henry of Battenberg
  - Prince Henry of the Netherlands (1820–1879)
  - Hermann, Prince of Hohenlohe-Langenburg
  - Prince Hermann of Saxe-Weimar-Eisenach (1825–1901)
  - Karl Eberhard Herwarth von Bittenfeld
  - Paul von Hindenburg
  - Dietrich von Hülsen-Haeseler
  - Isma'il Pasha
  - Archduke John of Austria
  - Prince Johann of Schleswig-Holstein-Sonderburg-Glücksburg
  - John of Saxony
  - Duke John Albert of Mecklenburg
  - Archduke Joseph Karl of Austria
  - Joseph, Duke of Saxe-Altenburg
  - Prince Julius of Schleswig-Holstein-Sonderburg-Glücksburg
  - Prince Karl Anton of Hohenzollern
  - Karl Anton, Prince of Hohenzollern
  - Archduke Karl Ludwig of Austria
  - Prince Karl Theodor of Bavaria
  - Karl, Prince of Hohenzollern-Sigmaringen
  - Hans von Kirchbach
  - Grand Duke Konstantin Konstantinovich of Russia
  - Grand Duke Konstantin Nikolayevich of Russia
  - Konstantin of Hohenlohe-Schillingsfürst
  - Prince Kraft of Hohenlohe-Ingelfingen
  - Leopold I of Belgium
  - Leopold II of Belgium
  - Leopold IV, Duke of Anhalt
  - Prince Leopold Clement of Saxe-Coburg and Gotha
  - Prince Leopold, Duke of Albany
  - Leopold, Hereditary Prince of Anhalt
  - Prince Leopold of Bavaria
  - Leopold, Prince of Hohenzollern
  - Prince Leopold of Saxe-Coburg and Gotha
  - Charles Liedts
  - Eugène, 8th Prince of Ligne
  - Louis III, Grand Duke of Hesse
  - Louis IV, Grand Duke of Hesse
  - Louis II, Grand Duke of Baden
  - Prince Louis of Battenberg
  - Prince Louis, Duke of Nemours
  - Louis Philippe I
  - Ludwig I of Bavaria
  - Ludwig II of Bavaria
  - Prince Ludwig August of Saxe-Coburg and Gotha
  - Prince Ludwig Ferdinand of Bavaria
  - Prince Ludwig Gaston of Saxe-Coburg and Gotha
  - Archduke Ludwig Viktor of Austria
  - Luís I of Portugal
  - Luitpold, Prince Regent of Bavaria
  - Edwin Freiherr von Manteuffel
  - Marie of Romania
  - Duke Maximilian Emanuel in Bavaria
  - Prince Maximilian of Baden
  - Maximilian II of Bavaria
  - Duke William of Mecklenburg-Schwerin
  - Emperor Meiji
  - Albert von Mensdorff-Pouilly-Dietrichstein
  - Alexander von Mensdorff-Pouilly, Prince von Dietrichstein zu Nikolsburg
  - Emmanuel von Mensdorff-Pouilly
  - Klemens von Metternich
  - Richard von Metternich
  - Grand Duke Michael Alexandrovich of Russia
  - Milan I of Serbia
  - Helmuth von Moltke the Elder
  - Prince Moritz of Saxe-Altenburg
  - Napoleon III
  - Nicholas I of Montenegro
  - Nicholas I of Russia
  - Grand Duke Nicholas Konstantinovich of Russia
  - Grand Duke Nicholas Nikolaevich of Russia (1831–1891)
  - Prince Nikolaus Wilhelm of Nassau
  - Jean-Baptiste Nothomb
  - Olav V of Norway
  - Archduke Otto of Austria (1865–1906)
  - Otto of Greece
  - Duke Paul Frederick of Mecklenburg
  - Paul Frederick, Grand Duke of Mecklenburg-Schwerin
  - Pedro II of Brazil
  - Pedro V of Portugal
  - Prince Pedro Augusto of Saxe-Coburg and Gotha
  - Peter II, Grand Duke of Oldenburg
  - Duke Peter of Oldenburg
  - Nicolae Petrescu-Comnen
  - Prince Philipp of Saxe-Coburg and Gotha
  - Duke Philipp of Württemberg
  - Prince Philippe, Count of Flanders
  - Hans von Plessen
  - Prince Frederick William of Hesse-Kassel
  - Prince Friedrich Wilhelm of Prussia
  - Archduke Rainer Ferdinand of Austria
  - Charles Rogier
  - Prince Rudolf of Liechtenstein
  - Rudolf, Crown Prince of Austria
  - Rupprecht, Crown Prince of Bavaria
  - Prince William of Schaumburg-Lippe
  - Count d'Arschot Schoonhoven
  - Albert Joseph, 1st Count Goblet d'Alviela.
  - Grand Duke Sergei Alexandrovich of Russia
  - Sir Francis Seymour, 1st Baronet
  - Princess Sibylla of Saxe-Coburg and Gotha
  - Duke Siegfried August in Bavaria
  - Archduke Stephen of Austria (Palatine of Hungary)
  - Otto Graf zu Stolberg-Wernigerode
  - Alfred von Tirpitz
  - Umberto I of Italy
  - Prince Valdemar of Denmark
  - Sylvain Van de Weyer
  - Victor I, Duke of Ratibor
  - Victor II, Duke of Ratibor
  - Victoria, Princess Royal
  - Grand Duke Vladimir Alexandrovich of Russia
  - Grand Duke Vladimir Kirillovich of Russia
  - Illarion Vorontsov-Dashkov
  - Alfred von Waldersee
  - Wilhelm II, German Emperor
  - Wilhelm, German Crown Prince
  - Prince Wilhelm of Prussia (1783–1851)
  - Prince Wilhelm of Saxe-Weimar-Eisenach
  - William I, German Emperor
  - William II, Elector of Hesse
  - William II of Württemberg
  - William III of the Netherlands
  - William Ernest, Grand Duke of Saxe-Weimar-Eisenach
  - Prince William of Baden (1829–1897)
  - Prince William of Hesse-Philippsthal-Barchfeld
  - Duke William of Württemberg
  - William, Duke of Brunswick
  - William, Prince of Hohenzollern
  - William, Prince of Wied
  - Woldemar, Prince of Lippe
  - Friedrich Graf von Wrangel
  - Duke Eugen of Württemberg (1846–1877)
  - Ferdinand von Zeppelin
- Grand Masters
  - Alfred, Duke of Saxe-Coburg and Gotha
  - Andreas, Prince of Saxe-Coburg and Gotha
  - Bernhard II, Duke of Saxe-Meiningen
  - Bernhard III, Duke of Saxe-Meiningen
  - Charles Edward, Duke of Saxe-Coburg and Gotha
  - Ernest I, Duke of Saxe-Coburg and Gotha
  - Ernest II, Duke of Saxe-Coburg and Gotha
  - Ernst I, Duke of Saxe-Altenburg
  - Ernst II, Duke of Saxe-Altenburg
  - Frederick, Duke of Saxe-Altenburg
  - Georg II, Duke of Saxe-Meiningen
  - Georg, Duke of Saxe-Altenburg
  - Joseph, Duke of Saxe-Altenburg
- Commanders, 1st Class
  - Martin Chales de Beaulieu
  - Franz Breithaupt
  - Oscar Von Kohorn
  - Fritz von Loßberg
  - Karl von Plettenberg
  - Hans von Seeckt
  - Julius von Verdy du Vernois
- Commanders, 2nd Class
  - Franz Breithaupt
  - Åge Lundström
- Knights, 1st Class
  - Oswald Boelcke
  - Friedrich Wilhelm von Lindeiner-Wildau
  - Curt von Morgen
  - Walther Reinhardt
  - Manfred von Richthofen
- Knights, 2nd Class
  - Ernst Freiherr von Althaus
  - Charles Baugniet
  - Gaston Errembault de Dudzeele (died 1888)
  - Carl Friedrich von Pückler-Burghauss
- Unclassified
  - Princess Augusta of Saxe-Meiningen
  - Leonhard Kaupisch
  - Julius Kühn
  - Emil Uzelac
  - Princess Victoria Melita of Saxe-Coburg and Gotha
  - Nikola Zhekov
