= Augusta Katherine Gordon-Lennox =

Augusta Katherine
- Princess Edward of Saxe-Weimar
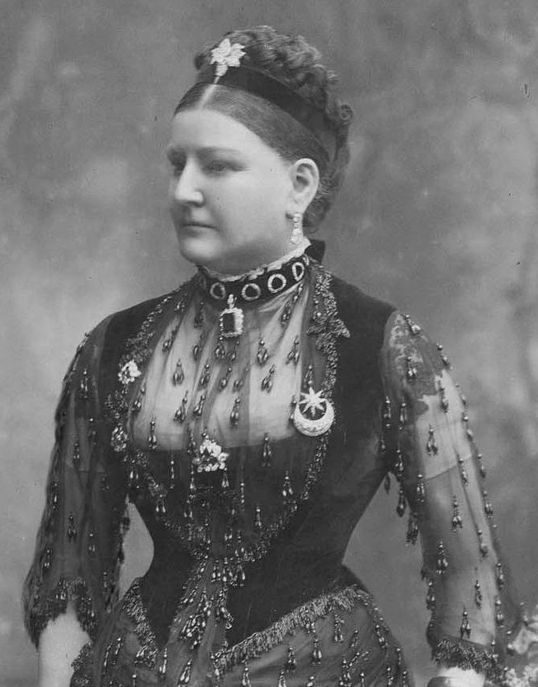
- Augusta Katherine c. 1875
- Born: Augusta Katherine Lennox; 14 January 1827; Goodwood House, Chichester, England
- Died: 3 April 1904 (aged 77); London, England
- Spouse: Prince Edward of Saxe-Weimar (m. 1851; died 1902)
- Father: Charles Gordon-Lennox, 5th Duke of Richmond
- Mother: Lady Caroline Paget

Princess Edward of Saxe-Weimar (born Lady Augusta Katherine Lennox; later Gordon-Lennox; 14 January 1827 – 3 April 1904) was a British aristocrat whose marriage to Prince Edward of Saxe-Weimar made her a relative of the British royal family.

== Biography ==
Lady Augusta Katherine Lennox was born on 14 January 1827 at Goodwood House to Charles Lennox, 5th Duke of Richmond, and his wife Lady Caroline Paget, daughter of Henry Paget, 1st Marquess of Anglesey. She descended in the male line from Charles Lennox, 1st Duke of Richmond, the illegitimate son of King Charles II of England by his mistress Louise de Kérouaille. When her father inherited the Gordon estates from his uncle, the father took the surname Gordon-Lennox for himself and his descendants, by royal licence dated 9 August 1836.

On 27 November 1851, Augusta Katherine morganatically married Prince Edward of Saxe-Weimar in London. He was a son of Prince Bernhard of Saxe-Weimar-Eisenach and his wife Princess Ida of Saxe-Meiningen, the sister of Adelaide, wife of King William IV of the United Kingdom. Augusta Katherine was created Gräfin von Dornburg (Countess of Dornburg) by the uncle of her future husband Charles Frederick, Grand Duke of Saxe-Weimar-Eisenach the day before the wedding. They had no children.

In 1885, Queen Victoria granted her permission to share her husband's princely title. She was thereafter known as Her Serene Highness Princess Edward of Saxe-Weimar, albeit only in the United Kingdom, while in Germany she remained only Countess of Dornburg. Her husband died on 16 November 1902 and she died on 3 April 1904 aged 77 in London.

== Titles ==
- 14 January 1827 – 26 November 1851: Lady Augusta Katherine Gordon-Lennox
- 26 November 1851 – 1885: Augusta Katherine, Countess of Dornburg
- 1885 – 3 April 1904: Her Serene Highness Princess Edward of Saxe-Weimar
