= Prince Bernhard of Saxe-Weimar-Eisenach (1792–1862) =

German nobleman and soldier

Prince Bernhard
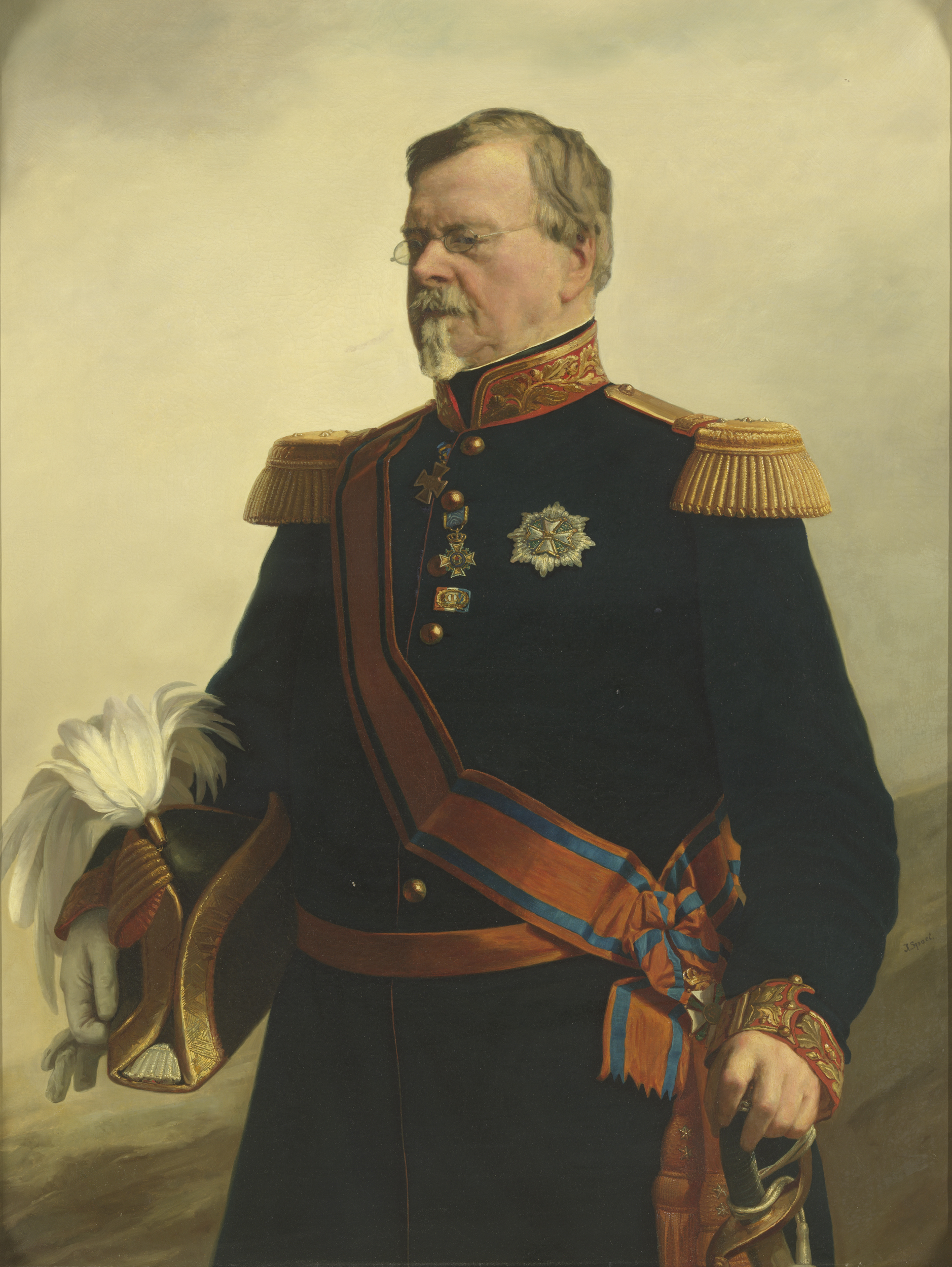
- Portrait of Prince Bernhard, by Jacob Spoel, between 1840 and 1862
- Born: 30 May 1792; Weimar
- Died: 31 July 1862 (aged 70); Schloss Belvedere, Weimar
- Spouse: Princess Ida of Saxe-Meiningen (m. 1816; died 1852)
- Issue: Princess Luise Wilhelmine; Prince Wilhelm Carl; Princess Amalie Auguste; Prince Edward; Prince Hermann; Prince Frederick Gustav; Princess Anna; Amalia, Princess Henry of the Netherlands
Names
- Charles Bernhard
- House: Saxe-Weimar-Eisenach
- Father: Charles Augustus, Grand Duke of Saxe-Weimar-Eisenach
- Mother: Princess Louisa of Hesse-Darmstadt

Prince Carl Bernhard of Saxe-Weimar-Eisenach (30 May 1792 – 31 July 1862) was a distinguished soldier, who, in 1815, after the congress of Vienna, became colonel of a regiment in the service of the king of the Netherlands. He fought at the Battle of Quatre Bras and the Battle of Waterloo where he commanded the 2nd Brigade of the 2nd Dutch Division, and later became a Chief Commander of the Royal Netherlands East Indies Army.

== Early life ==
Prince Bernhard was born on 30 May 1792 in Weimar. He was the seventh, and youngest, child of Charles Augustus, Grand Duke of Saxe-Weimar-Eisenach and Princess Louisa of Hesse-Darmstadt (1757–1830). Among his siblings were Charles Frederick, Grand Duke of Saxe-Weimar-Eisenach, and Princess Caroline Louise of Saxe-Weimar-Eisenach (who married Frederick Louis, Hereditary Grand Duke of Mecklenburg-Schwerin).

His paternal grandparents were Ernst August II, Duke of Saxe-Weimar and Saxe-Eisenach and Duchess Anna Amalia of Brunswick-Wolfenbüttel. His maternal grandparents were Louis IX, Landgrave of Hesse-Darmstadt and Countess Palatine Caroline of Zweibrücken. Among his maternal family were aunts Princess Frederica Louisa of Hesse-Darmstadt, the wife of King Frederick William II of Prussia, and Princess Wilhelmina of Hesse-Darmstadt, the first wife of Emperor Paul I of Russia. His maternal uncles included Louis I, Grand Duke of Hesse and Prince Christian of Hesse-Darmstadt, Landgrave of Hesse-Darmstadt.

== Career ==
Prince Bernhard enlisted in the Prussian Army and, in 1806, fought in the Army of Hohenlohe-Ingelfingen. By 1809, he had enlisted in the Saxon Army and he fought under Marshal Bernadotte at Wagram.

=== Waterloo campaign ===
Prince Bernhard's 2nd Brigade of the 2nd Dutch Division (Sedlnitsky) was the first of the Duke of Wellington's forces to arrive at the cross roads of Quatre Bras. Prince Bernhard's brigade (joined later by the 1st Brigade,) held the cross roads at Quatre Bras for almost 24 hours from the late afternoon of 15 June 1815, until about 3 p.m. on the 16 June, preventing Marshal Michel Ney with the left wing of the French L'Armée du Nord from taking the cross roads before the Duke of Wellington and substantial allied forces arrived to reinforce the 2nd Division and fight the Battle of Quatre Bras. The successful holding action by the two brigades of the Dutch 2nd Division was one of the most important actions by any of the coalition brigades in the whole of the Waterloo Campaign.

At the Battle of Waterloo Prince Bernhard commanded the allied forces holding the farms of Papelotte, Frischermont and La Haie on the extreme left of the Duke of Wellington's line of battle. They were strategically important, not just because if the forces holding these positions gave way then the French could out flank Wellington, but because it was from that direction that Wellington expected and received Prussian support. Though in the course of the battle Durutte's 4th French Division obtained a temporary foothold in Papelotte, it was never captured

=== Commander of the Dutch East Indies Army ===
Bernhard was appointed commander of the Dutch East Indies Army on December 6, 1848, and arrived on April 14, 1849, in Java. Barely a few weeks after his arrival, the commander of the third Balinese expedition, General Andreas Victor Michiels was killed at Kasumba; and Saxe-Weimar offered to the Governor-General to take over the leadership of the expedition, acting according to the rules that had been given to General Michiels. In the winter of 1849 he was promoted to general of the infantry and three years later (1852) he returned to the Netherlands, for his health, after many improvements and having accomplished to restore the East Indies army. He received on October 5, 1853, an honorable retirement.

=== Later life ===
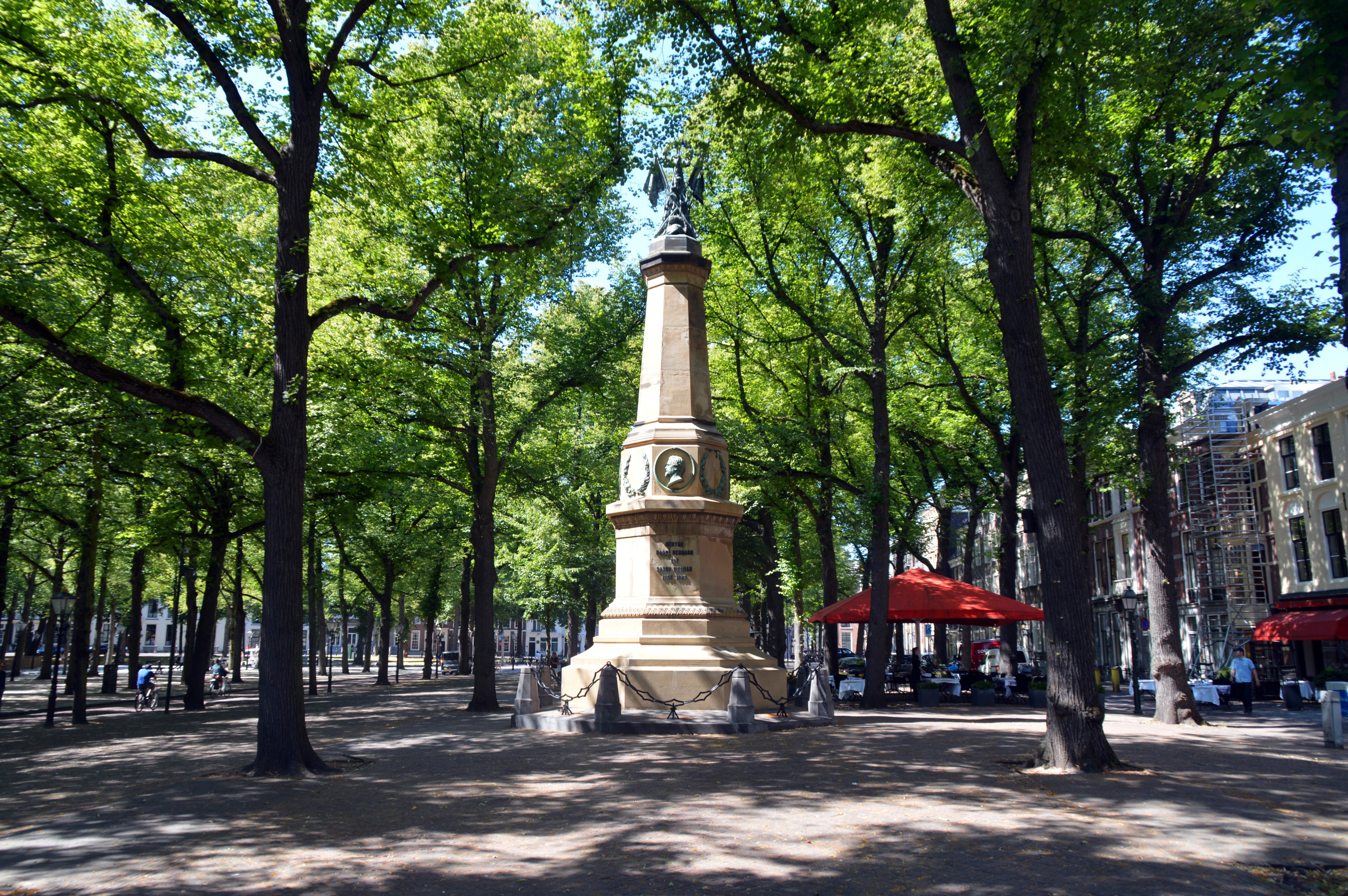
Karel Bernhard van Saksen-Weimar-Eisenach Memorial in The Hague

Prince Bernhard traveled extensively in the United States between 1825 and 1826. A heavily edited account of his travels, Reise seiner Hoheit des Herzogs Bernhard zu Sachsen-Weimar-Eisenach durch Nord-Amerika (Journey of His Highness Duke Bernhard of Saxe-Weimar-Eisenach through North America), was published by the historian Heinrich Luden in 1828. The work was translated into English and published in Philadelphia, also in 1828, as Travels through North America, during the Years 1825 and 1826. A critical edition of the original manuscript became available in 2017.

In the years after Waterloo, Bernhard distinguished himself as commander of a Dutch Division in the Belgian campaign of 1831 (the Ten Days Campaign), and from 1847 to 1850 held the command of the forces in the Dutch East Indies.

== Personal life ==
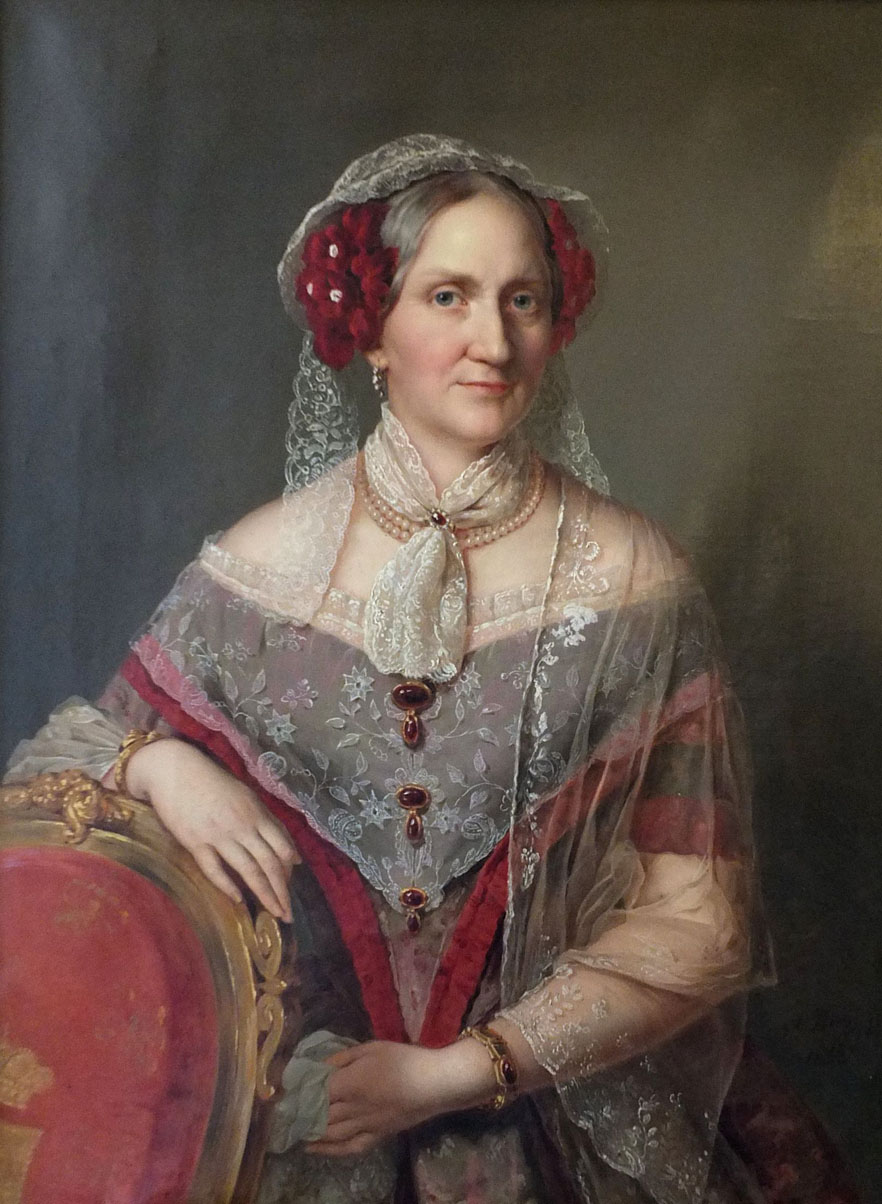
Portrait of his wife, Princess Ida, by Samuel Friedrich Diez

On 30 May 1816 in Meiningen, Prince Bernhard married Princess Ida of Saxe-Meiningen (1794–1852), a daughter of Georg I, Duke of Saxe-Meiningen and Princess Louise Eleonore of Hohenlohe-Langenburg. Among her siblings were Princess Adelheid (who married King William IV of the United Kingdom), and Bernhard II, Duke of Saxe-Meiningen (who married Princess Marie Frederica of Hesse-Kassel). Together, they were the parents of:

- Princess Luise Wilhelmine Adelaide (1817–1832), who died unmarried.
- Prince Wilhelm Carl (1819–1839), who died unmarried.
- Princess Amalie Auguste Cecilia (1822–1822), who died in infancy.
- Prince William Augustus Edward of Saxe-Weimar (1823–1902), who entered the British Army and served in the Crimean War; he married Lady Augusta Gordon-Lennox, a daughter of Charles Lennox, 5th Duke of Richmond and Lady Caroline Paget (a daughter of Henry Paget, 1st Marquess of Anglesey); she was created Countess of Dornburg in 1851.
- Prince Hermann of Saxe-Weimar-Eisenach (1825–1901), who married Princess Augusta of Württemberg, the youngest daughter of King William I of Württemberg and Duchess Pauline Therese of Württemberg.
- Prince Frederick Gustav of Saxe-Weimar-Eisenach (1827–1892), who married Pierina Marocchia nobile di Marcaini, who was created Baroness of Neuperg in 1872.
- Princess Anna Amalie Maria of Saxe-Weimar-Eisenach (1828–1864), who died unmarried.
- Princess Amalia of Saxe-Weimar-Eisenach (1830–1872), who married Prince William Frederick Henry of the Netherlands.

He died 21 July 1862 in Liebenstein. His residence in Batavia (now Jakarta) was later used for sessions of the Volksraad quasi-legislature of the Dutch East Indies and the Investigating Committee for Preparatory Work for Independence (BPUPK). Now owned by the Indonesian Ministry of Foreign Affairs, it is preserved as the Pancasila Building.

=== Descendants ===
Through his son Hermann, he was a grandfather of Princess Pauline of Saxe-Weimar-Eisenach, who married Charles Augustus, Hereditary Grand Duke of Saxe-Weimar-Eisenach, and Prince Wilhelm of Saxe-Weimar-Eisenach (1853-1924), who married Princess Gerta of Isenburg-Büdingen-Wächtersbach.

== Honours ==
He received the following orders and decorations:

- Saxe-Weimar-Eisenach: Grand Cross of the White Falcon, 15 December 1815
- Kingdom of Saxony:
  - Knight of the Military Order of St. Henry, 1809; Grand Cross, 1857
  - Knight of the Rue Crown, 1827
- Netherlands:
  - Knight of the Military William Order, 3rd Class, 8 July 1815; Commander, 24 May 1821; Grand Cross, 8 October 1842
  - Grand Cross of the Netherlands Lion
- Luxembourg: Grand Cross of the Oak Crown
- United Kingdom: Honorary Grand Cross of the Bath (military), 22 July 1830
- (Saxe-Coburg and Gotha) (Duchy of Saxe-Altenburg) (Saxe-Meiningen) Ernestine duchies: Grand Cross of the Saxe-Ernestine House Order, September 1835
- Württemberg: Grand Cross of the Württemberg Crown, 1835
- Russian Empire:
  - Knight of St. Andrew, 1837
  - Knight of St. Alexander Nevsky
  - Knight of St. Anna, 1st Class
  - Knight of the White Eagle
- Grand Duchy of Hesse: Grand Cross of the Ludwig Order, 23 May 1840
- Kingdom of Prussia:
  - Knight of the Black Eagle, 26 June 1841
  - Grand Cross of the Red Eagle
- Kingdom of France: Grand Cross of the Legion of Honour, June 1842
- Baden:
  - Knight of the House Order of Fidelity, 1844
  - Grand Cross of the Zähringer Lion, 1844
- Brunswick: Grand Cross of the Order of Henry the Lion
- Nassau: Knight of the Gold Lion of Nassau, September 1858

== Ancestry ==
Ancestors of Prince Bernhard of Saxe-Weimar-Eisenach (1792–1862)

8. Ernest Augustus I, Duke of Saxe-Weimar-Eisenach
4. Ernest Augustus II, Duke of Saxe-Weimar-Eisenach
9. Margravine Sophie Charlotte of Brandenburg-Bayreuth
2. Charles Augustus, Grand Duke of Saxe-Weimar-Eisenach
10. Charles I, Duke of Brunswick-Wolfenbüttel
5. Duchess Anna Amalia of Brunswick-Wolfenbüttel
11. Princess Philippine Charlotte of Prussia
1. Bernhard of Saxe-Weimar-Eisenach
12. Louis VIII, Landgrave of Hesse-Darmstadt
6. Louis IX, Landgrave of Hesse-Darmstadt
13. Countess Charlotte of Hanau-Lichtenberg
3. Princess Louise of Hesse-Darmstadt
14. Christian III, Count Palatine of Zweibrücken
7. Countess Palatine Caroline of Zweibrücken
15. Countess Caroline of Nassau-Saarbrücken
