= Princess Ida of Saxe-Meiningen =

Princess Ida
- Princess Bernhard of Saxe-Weimar-Eisenach
- Born: 25 June 1794; Meiningen, Thuringia
- Died: 4 April 1852 (aged 57); Weimar
- Burial: Weimarer Fürstengruft
- Spouse: Prince Bernhard of Saxe-Weimar-Eisenach (m. 1816)
- Issue: Prince Edward; Prince William; Prince Hermann; Prince Frederick; Princess Anna; Amalia, Princess Henry of the Netherlands
- House: Saxe-Meiningen
- Father: George I, Duke of Saxe-Meiningen
- Mother: Luise Eleonore of Hohenlohe-Langenburg

Princess Ida Caroline of Saxe-Meiningen (25 June 1794 – 4 April 1852), was a German princess, a member of the House of Wettin, and by marriage Princess of Saxe-Weimar-Eisenach.

== Biography ==
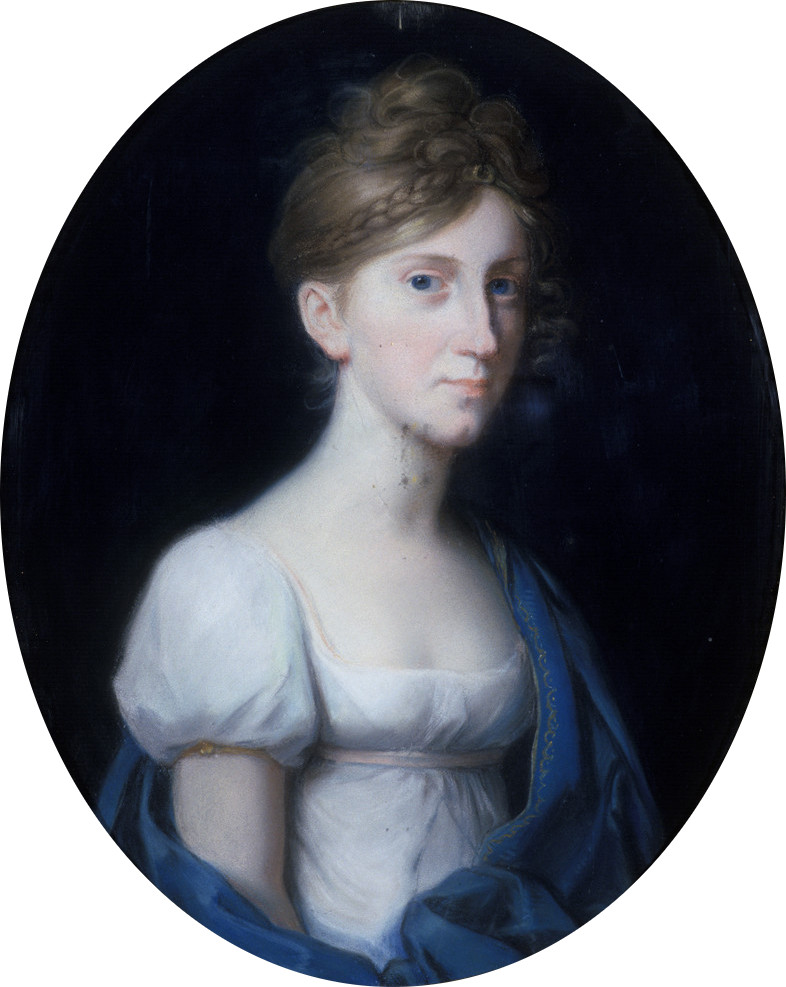
Ida aged about 15, by Johann Heinrich Schröder, 1808

Ida was born on 13 August 1794 at Meiningen, Thuringia, Germany. Her father was George I, Duke of Saxe-Meiningen; and her mother was Luise Eleonore, daughter of Prince Christian of Hohenlohe-Langenburg. She was titled Princess Ida of Saxe-Meiningen, Duchess in Saxony with the style Serene Highness from her birth until the Congress of Vienna (1814–15), when the entire House of Wettin was raised to the style of Highness. Her siblings were Adelaide (who became Queen consort of the United Kingdom and of Hanover as wife of King William IV of the United Kingdom) and Bernhard II, Duke of Saxe-Meiningen, with whom she maintained a close relationship.

In Meiningen on 30 May 1816 she married Prince Bernhard of Saxe-Weimar-Eisenach, who served as a General in the Netherlands and she followed him in his various garrison cities during the following years; however, during the summer she lived in Liebenstein and Altenstein Palace, where she also remained when her husband made his North American tour. In 1830 she and her children participated in the coronation of her sister and brother-in-law in London, and from 1836 she moved to Liebenstein as her permanent summer residence. Thanks to her charitable activities, Ida was very popular among the population.

On 22 June 1850 she was one of the godparents of Prince Arthur, Duke of Connaught and Strathearn, third son of Queen Victoria and Prince Albert; however, because was unable to be physically present, she was represented by the Duchess of Kent, mother of the Queen.

Ida died of pneumonia in Weimar on 4 April 1852 aged 57. Her last words were: "I hope that this night would sleep well". She was buried in the Weimarer Fürstengruft. Two years later, in 1854, her brother Bernhard II erected the called Ida monument at the now ruined Burg Liebenstein. In 2004 the monument was extensively renovated.

== Issue ==
- Princess Louise Wilhelmine Adelaide (31 March 1817 – 11 July 1832).
- Prince William Charles (25 June 1819 – 22 May 1839).
- Princess Amalie Auguste Cecilia (30 May 1822 – 16 June 1822)
- Prince William Augustus Edward (11 October 1823 – 16 November 1902), who entered the British army, served with much distinction in the Crimean War, became colonel of the 1st Life Guards, and later a British Field Marshal; married Lady Augusta Gordon-Lennox. They had no issue.
- Prince Hermann Bernhard Georg (4 August 1825 – 31 August 1901), married Princess Augusta of Württemberg; one of his daughters, Pauline, married Charles Augustus, Hereditary Grand Duke of Saxe-Weimar-Eisenach.
- Prince Frederick Gustav Charles (28 June 1827 – 6 January 1892), married Pierina Marocchia nobile di Marcaini, created Baroness of Neuperg (23 May 1872). They had no issue.
- Princess Anna Amalie Maria (9 September 1828 – 14 July 1864).
- Princess Amalie Maria da Gloria Auguste (20 May 1830 – 1 May 1872), who married Prince Henry of the Netherlands. They had no issue.

== Ancestry ==
Ancestors of Princess Ida of Saxe-Meiningen

16. Ernest I, Duke of Saxe-Gotha
8. Bernhard I, Duke of Saxe-Meiningen
17. Princess Elisabeth Sophie of Saxe-Altenburg
4. Anton Ulrich, Duke of Saxe-Meiningen
18. Anton Ulrich, Duke of Brunswick-Wolfenbüttel
9. Duchess Elisabeth Eleonore of Brunswick-Wolfenbüttel
19. Princess Elisabeth Juliane of Schleswig-Holstein-Sonderborg-Norburg
2. Georg I, Duke of Saxe-Meiningen
20. Philip, Landgrave of Hesse-Philippsthal
10. Charles I, Landgrave of Hesse-Philippsthal
21. Katharine Amalie of Solms-Laubach
5. Landgravine Charlotte Amalie of Hesse-Philippsthal
22. John George I, Duke of Saxe-Eisenach
11. Princess Katherine Christine of Saxe-Eisenach
23. Johannetta of Sayn-Wittgenstein
1. Princess Ida of Saxe-Meiningen
24. Albert Wolfgang, Count of Hohenlohe-Langenburg
12. Louis, Prince of Hohenlohe-Langenburg
25. Countess Sophie Amalie of Nassau-Saarbrücken
6. Christian Albert, Prince of Hohenlohe-Langenburg
26. Louis Crato, Count of Nassau-Saarbrücken (= 30)
13. Princess Eleonore of Nassau-Saarbrücken
27. Princess Philippine Henriette of Hohenlohe-Langenburg(= 31)
3. Princess Luise Eleonore of Hohenlohe-Langenburg
28. Louis Christian, Prince of Stolberg-Gedern
14. Frederick Charles of Stolberg-Gedern
29. Duchess Christine of Mecklenburg-Güstrow
7. Princess Karoline of Stolberg-Gedern
30. Louis Crato, Count of Nassau-Saarbrücken (= 26)
15. Countess Louise of Nassau-Saarbrücken
31. Princess Philippine Henriette of Hohenlohe-Langenburg (= 27)
