= Prince Hermann of Saxe-Weimar-Eisenach (1825–1901) =

German prince and military general (1825–1901)

Prince Hermann
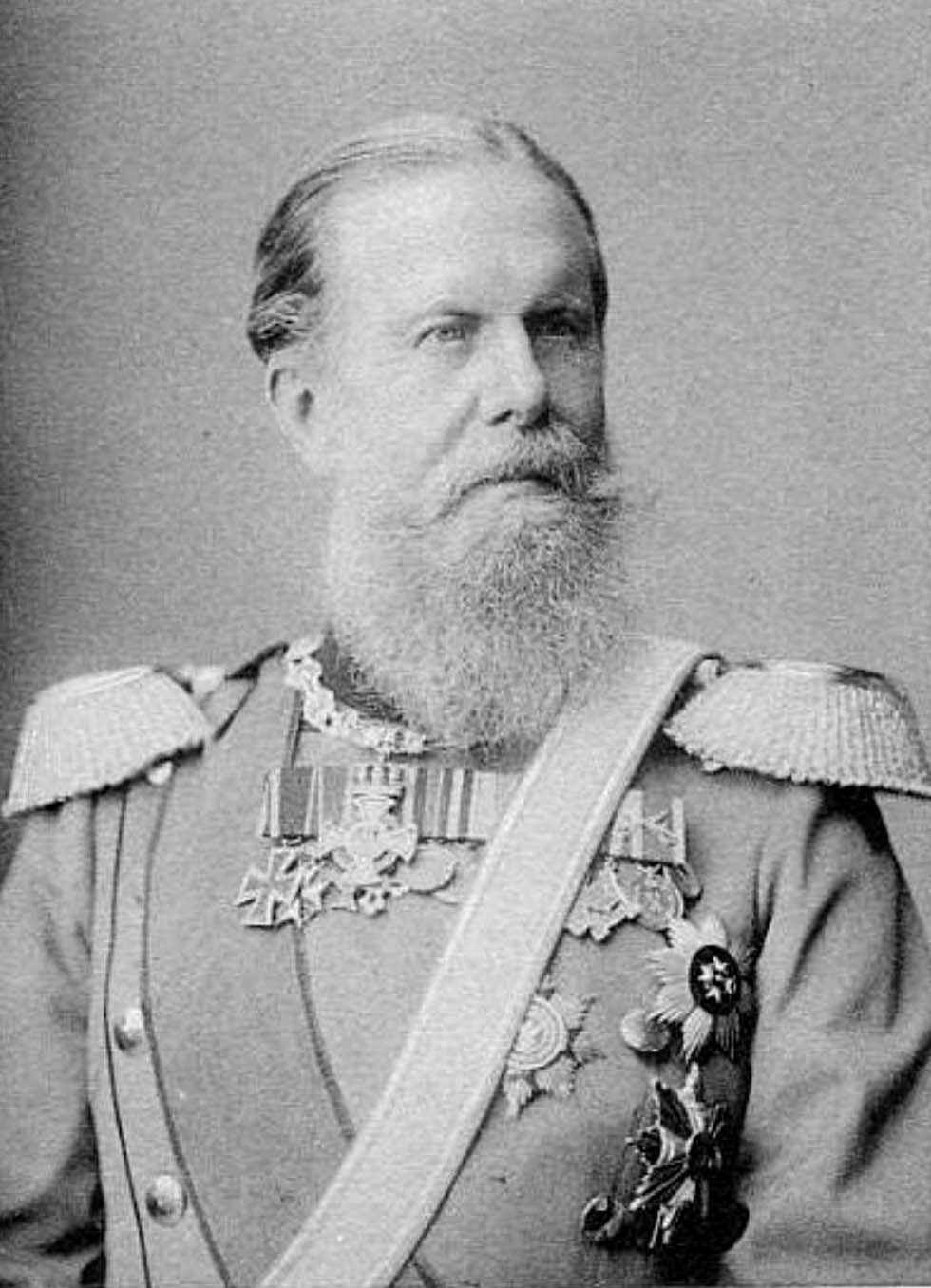
- Hermann c. 1870
- Born: 4 August 1825; Altenstein Castle
- Died: 31 August 1901 (aged 76); Berchtesgaden
- Burial: Prague Cemetery, Stuttgart
- Spouse: Princess Augusta of Württemberg (m. 1851; died 1898)
- Issue: Princess Pauline of Saxe-Weimar-Eisenach; Prince Wilhelm of Saxe-Weimar-Eisenach; Prince Bernhard Saxe-Weimar-Eisenach; Prince Alexander of Saxe-Weimar-Eisenach; Prince Ernest of Saxe-Weimar-Eisenach; Princess Olga of Saxe-Weimar-Eisenach
- House: Wettin
- Father: Prince Bernhard of Saxe-Weimar-Eisenach
- Mother: Princess Ida of Saxe-Meiningen

Hermann George Bernard of Saxe-Weimar-Eisenach (4 August 1825 at Altenstein Castle – 31 August 1901 in Berchtesgaden) was Prince of Saxe-Weimar-Eisenach and Duke of Saxony, and a general in the Württemberger army.

== Life ==
Hermann was the third son of Prince Bernard of Saxe-Weimar-Eisenach (1792–1862) from his marriage to Ida of Saxe-Meiningen (1794–1852), the daughter of George I, Duke of Saxe-Meiningen. He was a nephew of Queen Adelaide of Great Britain.

In 1840, Hermann enrolled at the military academy of Württemberg. He became a Major General and from 1859, he was commander of the Württemberg Royal Cavalry Division. He received several medals, including the Order of St. Alexander Nevsky, the Grand Cross of the Order of the White Falcon, the Order of Saint Stephen of Hungary and the Order of the Crown.

He died on 31 August 1901 and was buried at the Pragfriedhof in Stuttgart.

The Weimarstraße in Stuttgart is named after him.

== Marriage and issue ==
Hermann married on 17 June 1851 in Friedrichshafen to Princess Augusta of Württemberg (1826–1898), the youngest daughter of King William I of Württemberg. They had six children:

- Pauline (1852–1904) married 1873 to Hereditary Grand Duke Charles Augustus of Saxe-Weimar-Eisenach (1844–1894)
- Wilhelm (1853–1924) married in 1885 to Princess Gerta of Isenburg-Büdingen-Wächtersbach (1863–1945)
- Bernhard (1855–1907), from 1901 "Count of Crayenburg", married

1. in 1900 Marie Louise Brockmüller (1866-1903)
2. in 1905 Countess Elisabeth von der Schulenburg (1869-1940)

- Alexander (1857–1891)
- Ernest (1859–1909)
- Olga (1869–1924) married in 1902 Prince Leopold of Isenburg-Büdingen (1866–1933), eldest son of Karl, Prince of Isenburg-Büdingen. They had a son - Prinz Wilhelm Karl zu Isenburg-Büdingen (16 January 1903 - 23 November 1956).

== Honours ==
He received the following orders and decorations:

- Saxe-Weimar-Eisenach:
  - Grand Cross of the White Falcon, 12 September 1840
  - Badge of Honor for Meritorious Deeds during the 1870/71 War
- (Saxe-Coburg and Gotha) (Duchy of Saxe-Altenburg) (Saxe-Meiningen) Ernestine duchies: Grand Cross of the Saxe-Ernestine House Order, July 1846
- Württemberg:
  - Grand Cross of the Württemberg Crown, 1851
  - Grand Cross of the Friedrich Order, with Swords, 1871
  - Knight of the Order of Olga, 1871
  - Military Service Badge, 1st Class
  - Golden Jubilee Medal
- Kingdom of Saxony: Knight of the Rue Crown, 1853
- Grand Duchy of Hesse:
  - Grand Cross of the Ludwig Order, 5 November 1856
  - Military Medical Cross, 8 May 1872
- Austrian Empire: Grand Cross of St. Stephen, 1860
- Nassau: Knight of the Gold Lion of Nassau, July 1864
- Baden:
  - Knight of the House Order of Fidelity, 1864
  - Grand Cross of the Zähringer Lion, 1864
- Kingdom of Bavaria: Cross of Merit for 1870/71
- Hohenzollern: Cross of Honour of the Princely House Order of Hohenzollern, 1st Class
- Mecklenburg: Grand Cross of the Wendish Crown, with Crown in Gold
- Monaco: Grand Cross of St. Charles
- Netherlands:
  - Grand Cross of the Netherlands Lion
  - Grand Cross of the Military William Order
- Kingdom of Prussia:
  - Grand Cross of the Red Eagle, 8 October 1874
  - Knight of the Black Eagle, with Collar
  - Grand Commander's Cross of the Royal House Order of Hohenzollern
  - Iron Cross (1870), 2nd Class
  - Red Cross Medal, 1st Class, 27 January 1899
- Schaumburg-Lippe: Military Merit Medal
- Russian Empire:
  - Knight of St. Andrew
  - Knight of St. Alexander Nevsky
- United Kingdom: Golden Jubilee Medal

== Ancestry ==
Ancestors of Prince Hermann of Saxe-Weimar-Eisenach (1825–1901)

8. Ernest Augustus II, Duke of Saxe-Weimar-Eisenach
4. Charles Augustus, Grand Duke of Saxe-Weimar-Eisenach
9. Anna Amalia of Brunswick-Wolfenbüttel
2. Prince Bernhard of Saxe-Weimar-Eisenach
10. Louis IX, Landgrave of Hesse-Darmstadt
5. Louise of Hesse-Darmstadt
11. Caroline of Zweibrücken
1. Prince Hermann of Saxe-Weimar-Eisenach
12. Anton Ulrich, Duke of Saxe-Meiningen
6. George I, Duke of Saxe-Meiningen
13. Charlotte Amalie of Hesse-Philippsthal
3. Ida of Saxe-Meiningen
14. Prince Christian Albert of Hohenlohe-Langenburg
7. Luise Eleonore of Hohenlohe-Langenburg
15. Karoline of Stolberg-Gedern
