= Charles Augustus, Hereditary Grand Duke of Saxe-Weimar-Eisenach (1844–1894) =

German grand duke (1844–1894)

Karl August
- Hereditary Grand Duke of Saxe-Weimar-Eisenach
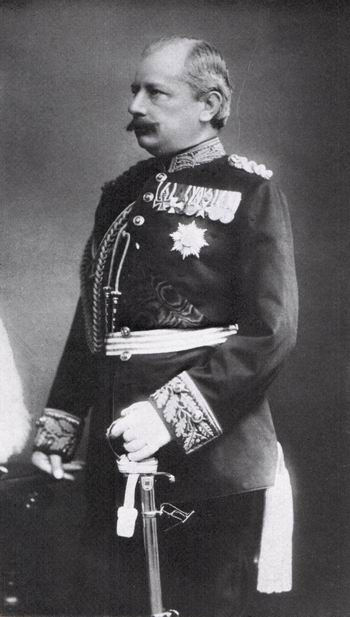
- Charles Augustus, circa 1890
- Born: 31 July 1844; Weimar
- Died: 20 November 1894 (aged 50); Cap Martin, France
- Burial: Weimar Royal Crypt, Weimar, Germany
- Spouse: Princess Pauline of Saxe-Weimar-Eisenach (m. 1873)
- Issue: Grand Duke William Ernest; Prince Bernhard Karl
Names
- German: Karl August Wilhelm Nicolaus Alexander Michael Bernhard Heinrich Frederick Stefan; English: Charles Augustus William Nicholas Alexander Michael Bernhard Henry Frederick Stephen
- House: House of Saxe-Weimar-Eisenach
- Father: Charles Alexander, Grand Duke of Saxe-Weimar-Eisenach
- Mother: Sophie of the Netherlands

Karl August, Hereditary Grand Duke of Saxe-Weimar-Eisenach (31 July 1844 – 20 November 1894) was a German prince and Hereditary Grand Duke (Erbgroßherzog) of Saxe-Weimar-Eisenach.

== Biography ==
Born in Weimar, Karl was the only son of Karl Alexander, Grand Duke of Saxe-Weimar-Eisenach and Princess Sophie of the Netherlands. He would serve in the army of the Grand Duchy of Saxony (Saxe-Weimar-Eisenach) and he was present when Wilhelm I was crowned as German emperor.

Because his mother was a daughter of King William II of the Netherlands and his older uncles, except King William III, died childless, Karl August was second in line in the succession to the throne of the Netherlands from 1890 to 1894. He was preceded only by his mother. This was the reason for him learning to write and speak fluent Dutch, due to the possibility of Karl August becoming king if his cousin Queen Wilhelmina of the Netherlands died without issue.

In leisure, Karl dedicated himself to his copperplate collection and coin cabinet. He was also interested in the Grand Ducal Library and the newly built archive, where he often studied historical documents on the history of the house. His popularity and his uncomplicated outreach to the residents of the Grand Duchy made him a beloved leader of the duchy.

Karl August died at Cap Martin, France, six years before his father; because of this, his eldest son Wilhelm Ernst succeeded his grandfather as Grand Duke. Karl August is buried in the Weimar royal crypt.

== Family and children ==
In Friedrichshafen on 26 August 1873 Karl August married Princess Pauline of Saxe-Weimar-Eisenach. They were second cousins, as she was the paternal granddaughter of Prince Bernhard, who had been in the service of the king of the Netherlands and was a younger brother of the Grand Duke Karl Frederick of Saxe-Weimar-Eisenach, the grandfather of Karl August. Her maternal grandparents were William I of Württemberg and his third wife Pauline Therese.

Karl August and Pauline had two sons:

1. Wilhelm Ernst Karl Alexander Friedrich Heinrich Bernhard Albert Georg Hermann, Grand Duke of Saxe-Weimar-Eisenach (b. Weimar, 10 June 1876 – d. Heinrichau, 24 April 1923).
2. Bernhard Karl Alexander Hermann Heinrich Wilhelm Oscar Friedrich Franz Peter (b. Weimar, 18 April 1878 – d. Weimar, 1 October 1900).

== Honours ==
He received the following awards:

- Saxe-Weimar-Eisenach: Grand Cross of the White Falcon, 29 August 1844
- Baden:
  - Knight of the House Order of Fidelity, 1863
  - Grand Cross of the Zähringer Lion, 1863
- Grand Duchy of Hesse: Grand Cross of the Ludwig Order, 16 May 1864
- Württemberg: Grand Cross of the Württemberg Crown, 1864
- Russian Empire:
  - Knight of St. Andrew, with Collar, 1864
  - Knight of St. Alexander Nevsky, 1864
  - Knight of the White Eagle, 1864
  - Knight of St. Anna, 1st Class, 1864
  - Knight of St. George, 4th Class, 1870
- (Saxe-Coburg and Gotha) (Duchy of Saxe-Altenburg) (Saxe-Meiningen) Ernestine duchies: Grand Cross of the Saxe-Ernestine House Order, December 1864
- Kingdom of Saxony: Knight of the Rue Crown, 1865
- Kingdom of Bavaria: Knight of St. Hubert, 1866
- Kingdom of Prussia:
  - Knight of the Black Eagle, 27 September 1866; with Collar, 1877
  - Grand Cross of the Iron Cross
  - War Commemorative Medal of 1870/71
- Oldenburg: Grand Cross of the Order of Duke Peter Friedrich Ludwig, with Golden Crown and Collar, 18 March 1867
- Duchy of Anhalt: Grand Cross of Albert the Bear, 1875
- Sweden-Norway: Knight of the Seraphim, 13 May 1878
- Netherlands:
  - Knight of the Military William Order, 3rd Class, 9 July 1878
  - Grand Cross of the Netherlands Lion
  - Grand Cross of the Gold Lion of Nassau
- Brunswick: Grand Cross of Henry the Lion, 1890
- Schaumburg-Lippe: Military Merit Medal with Swords
- Belgium: Grand Cordon of the Order of Leopold
- Kingdom of Greece: Grand Cross of the Redeemer
- Luxembourg: Grand Cross of the Oak Crown
- Ottoman Empire: Order of Osmanieh, 1st Class
- Mecklenburg: Grand Cross of the Wendish Crown, with Crown in Ore
- Austria-Hungary: Grand Cross of St. Stephen, 1892
- Empire of Japan: Grand Cordon of the Order of the Chrysanthemum, 23 July 1894

== Ancestry ==
Ancestors of Charles Augustus, Hereditary Grand Duke of Saxe-Weimar-Eisenach (1844–1894)

8. Charles Augustus, Grand Duke of Saxe-Weimar-Eisenach
4. Charles Frederick, Grand Duke of Saxe-Weimar-Eisenach
9. Princess Louise of Hesse-Darmstadt
2. Charles Alexander, Grand Duke of Saxe-Weimar-Eisenach
10. Paul I of Russia
5. Grand Duchess Maria Pavlovna of Russia
11. Duchess Sophie Dorothea of Württemberg
1. Charles Augustus, Hereditary Grand Duke of Saxe-Weimar-Eisenach
12. William I of the Netherlands
6. William II of the Netherlands
13. Princess Wilhelmine of Prussia
3. Princess Sophie of the Netherlands
14. Paul I of Russia (= 10)
7. Grand Duchess Anna Pavlovna of Russia
15. Duchess Sophie Dorothea of Württemberg (= 11)
