= Princess Augusta of Württemberg =

German princess (1826–1898)

Princess Augusta
- Princess Hermann of Saxe-Weimar-Eisenach
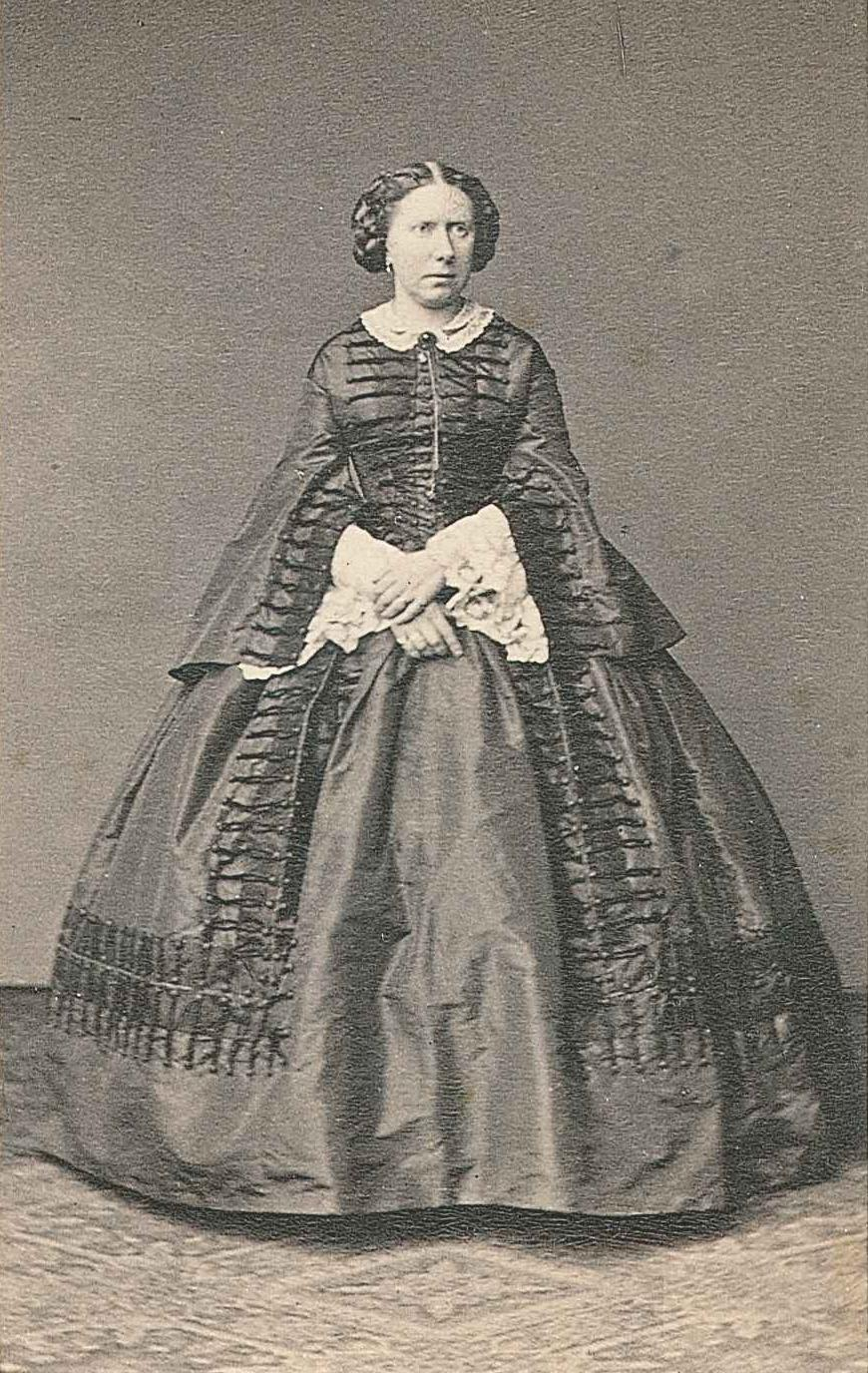
- Cabinet portrait of Princess Augusta of Württemberg
- Born: 4 October 1826; Stuttgart
- Died: 3 December 1898 (aged 72); Stuttgart
- Burial: 6 December 1898; Prague Cemetery, Stuttgart
- Spouse: Prince Hermann of Saxe-Weimar-Eisenach (m. 1851)
- Issue: Pauline, Hereditary Grand Duchess of Saxe-Weimar-Eisenach; Prince Wilhelm; Prince Bernhard, Count of Crayenburg; Prince Alexander; Prince Ernest; Olga, Princess Leopold of Isenburg-Büdingen
- Father: William I of Württemberg
- Mother: Pauline of Württemberg

Princess Augusta of Württemberg (4 October 1826 – 3 December 1898) was the daughter of King William I of Württemberg and Pauline of Württemberg.

== Life ==
Augusta was the third and last child of her parents' marriage. She was described as unattractive, but cheerful and wise. On 17 June 1851, she married Prince Hermann of Saxe-Weimar and Eisenach. He was her age and served in the Cavalry of Württemberg as an officer. Later that year, he was promoted from Rittmeister to lieutenant colonel. In 1853, he was promoted to commander of the guards regiment.

Weimar Palace at Neckarstraße 25 was, for many years, the center of an artistically oriented social life. In 1865, Hermann left the army with the rank of lieutenant general, because he was denied further promotions. He had tried to become King Charles's adjutant general and imperial governor of Alsace-Lorraine but was unsuccessful. For lack of other activities, Prince Weimar, as he was called in Stuttgart, supported social, patriotic and artistic societies.

== Issue ==
Hermann and Augusta had six children:

- Princess Pauline of Saxe-Weimar-Eisenach (1852-1904)

married in 1873 to Hereditary Grand Duke Charles Augustus of Saxe-Weimar-Eisenach (1844-1894)

- Prince Wilhelm of Saxe-Weimar-Eisenach (1853-1924)

married in 1885 to Princess Gerta of Isenburg-Büdingen-Wächtersbach (1863-1945)

- Prince Bernhard Saxe-Weimar-Eisenach (1855-1907), from 1901 "Count of Crayenburg", married

1. in 1900 to Marie Louise Brockmüller (1866-1903)
2. in 1905 to Countess Elisabeth von der Schulenburg (1869-1940)

- Prince Alexander of Saxe-Weimar-Eisenach (1857-1891)
- Prince Ernest of Saxe-Weimar-Eisenach (1859-1909)
- Princess Olga of Saxe-Weimar-Eisenach (1869-1924)

married in 1902 to Prince Leopold of Isenburg-Büdingen (1866-1933), eldest son of Karl, Prince of Isenburg-Büdingen.

== Ancestry ==
Ancestors of Princess Augusta of Württemberg

8. Frederick II Eugene, Duke of Württemberg
4. Frederick I of Württemberg
9. Princess Friederike of Brandenburg-Schwedt
2. William I of Württemberg
10. Charles William Ferdinand, Duke of Brunswick
5. Duchess Augusta of Brunswick-Wolfenbüttel
11. Princess Augusta of Great Britain
1. Princess Augusta of Württemberg
12. Frederick II Eugene, Duke of Württemberg (= 8)
6. Duke Louis of Württemberg
13. Princess Friederike of Brandenburg-Schwedt (= 9)
3. Duchess Pauline Therese of Württemberg
14. Charles Christian, Prince of Nassau-Weilburg
7. Princess Henriette of Nassau-Weilburg
15. Princess Carolina of Orange-Nassau
