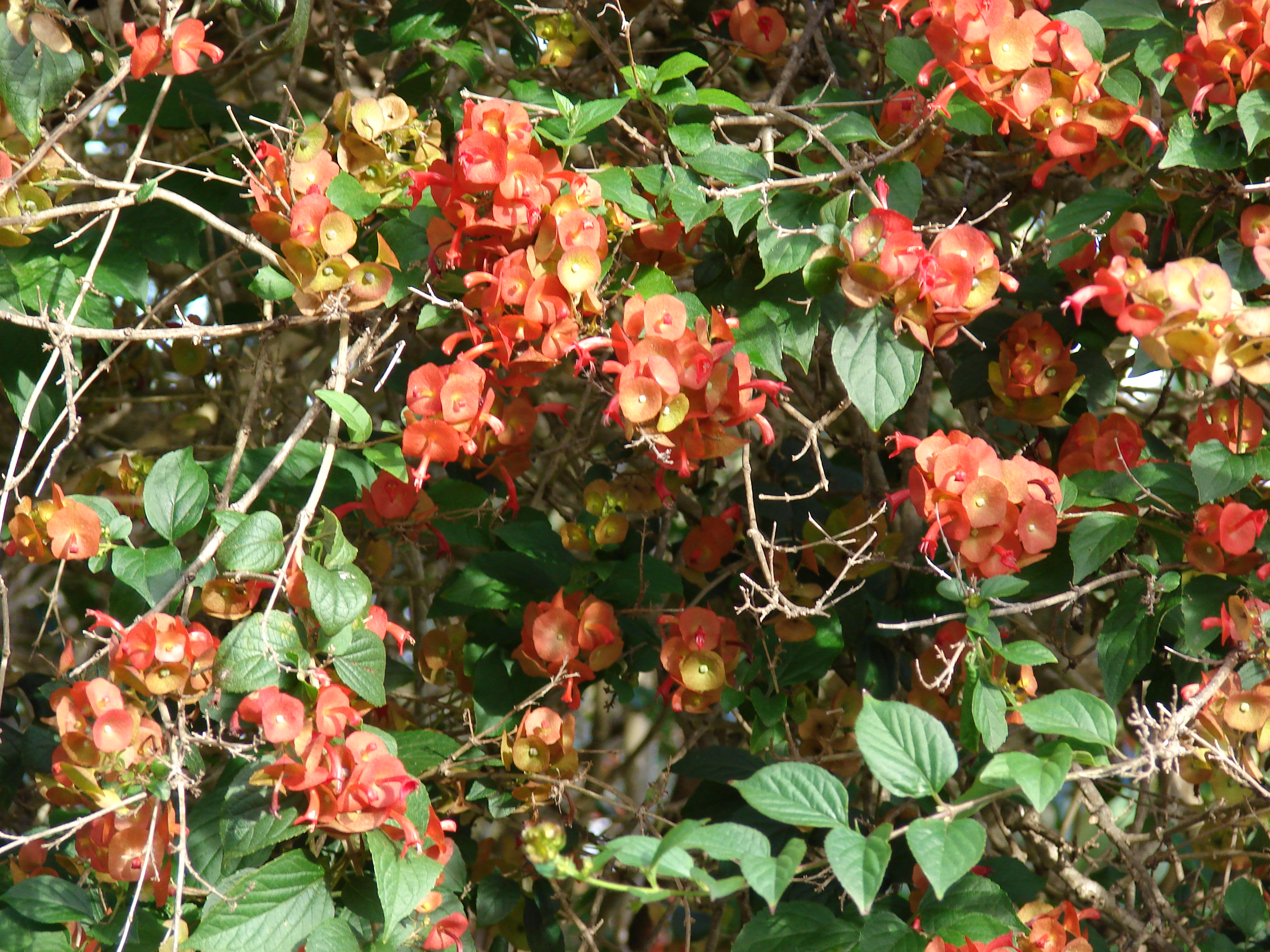

Scientific classification
- Kingdom: Plantae
- Clade: Tracheophytes
- Clade: Angiosperms
- Clade: Eudicots
- Clade: Asterids
- Order: Lamiales
- Family: Lamiaceae
- Subfamily: Scutellarioideae
- Genus: Holmskioldia; Retz.
- Species: H. sanguinea

Binomial name
- Holmskioldia sanguinea Retz.

Synonyms
- Hastingia K.D.Koenig ex Sm.; Platunum A.Juss.; Hastingia coccinea Sm.; Holmskioldia rubra Pers.; Holmskioldia scandens Sweet; Hastingia scandens Roxb.

= Holmskioldia =

- Holmskioldia sanguinea

Genus of flowering plants

Holmskioldia is a genus of flowering plants in the mint family, Lamiaceae. It is native to the Himalayas (India, Pakistan, Nepal, Bhutan, Bangladesh, Myanmar) but widely cultivated as an ornamental and naturalized in many places (Southeast Asia, New Caledonia, Hawaii, Mexico, West Indies, Venezuela, etc.) It contains only one known species, Holmskioldia sanguinea, commonly called the Chinese hat plant, cup-and-saucer-plant or mandarin's hat.

The genus name commemorates Johan Theodor Holmskiold (1731–1793), a Danish botanist who wrote Beata ruris otia fungis Danicis, published in two volumes in 1790 and 1799.

== Species formerly included ==
The following species have been moved to genus Karomia:

- Holmskioldia gigas Faden = Karomia gigas (Faden) Verdc.
- Holmskioldia speciosa Hutch. & Corbishley = Karomia speciosa (Hutch. & Corbishley) R.Fern. – Southern Chinese hats, wild parasol flower
- Holmskioldia tettensis (Klotzsch) Vatke = Karomia tettensis (Klotzsch) R.Fern. – Cups-and-saucers, wild parasol flower

The plant contains oroxindin, a type of polyphenolic compound.

== Gallery ==
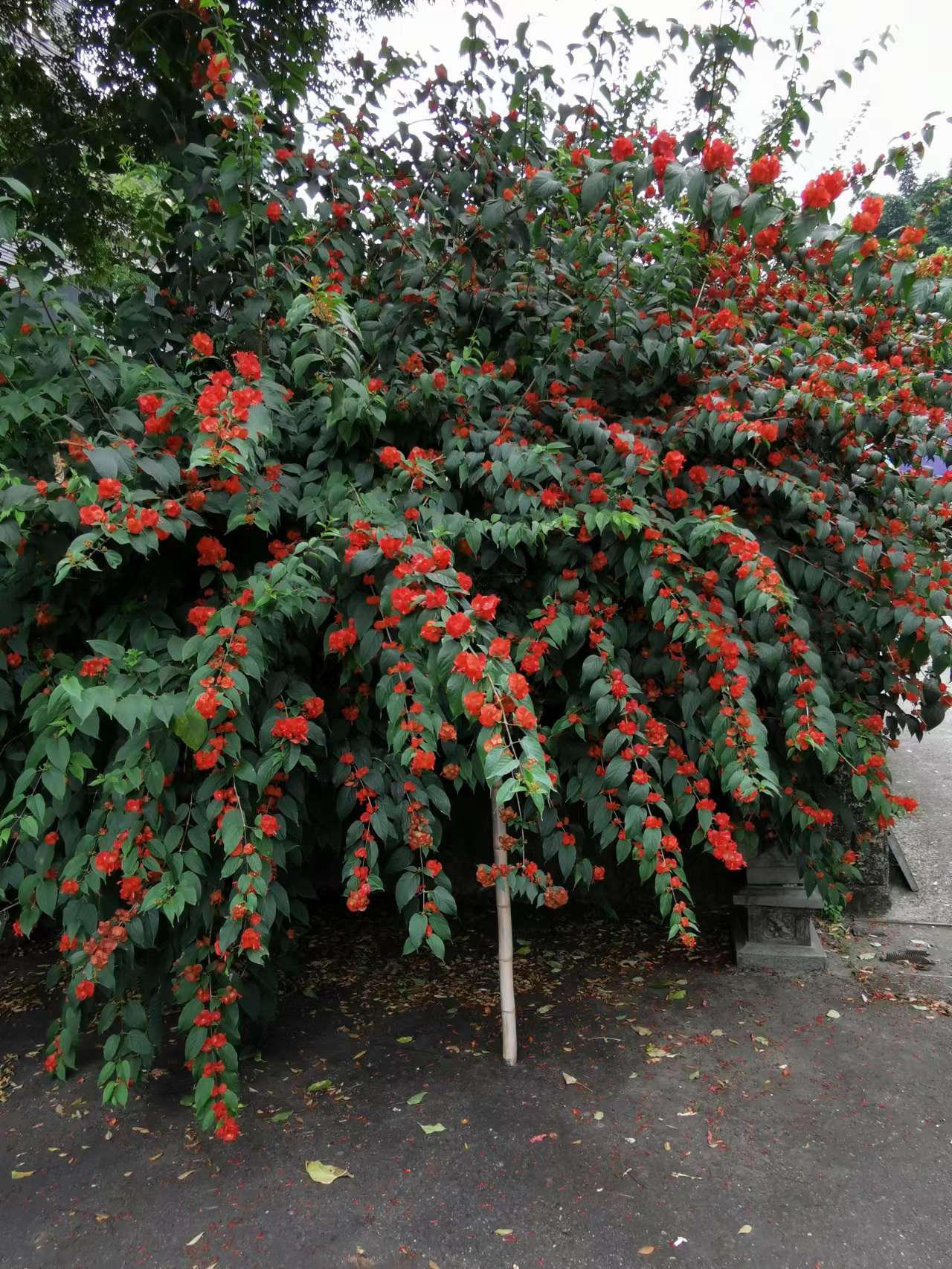
Blooms in autumn and winter

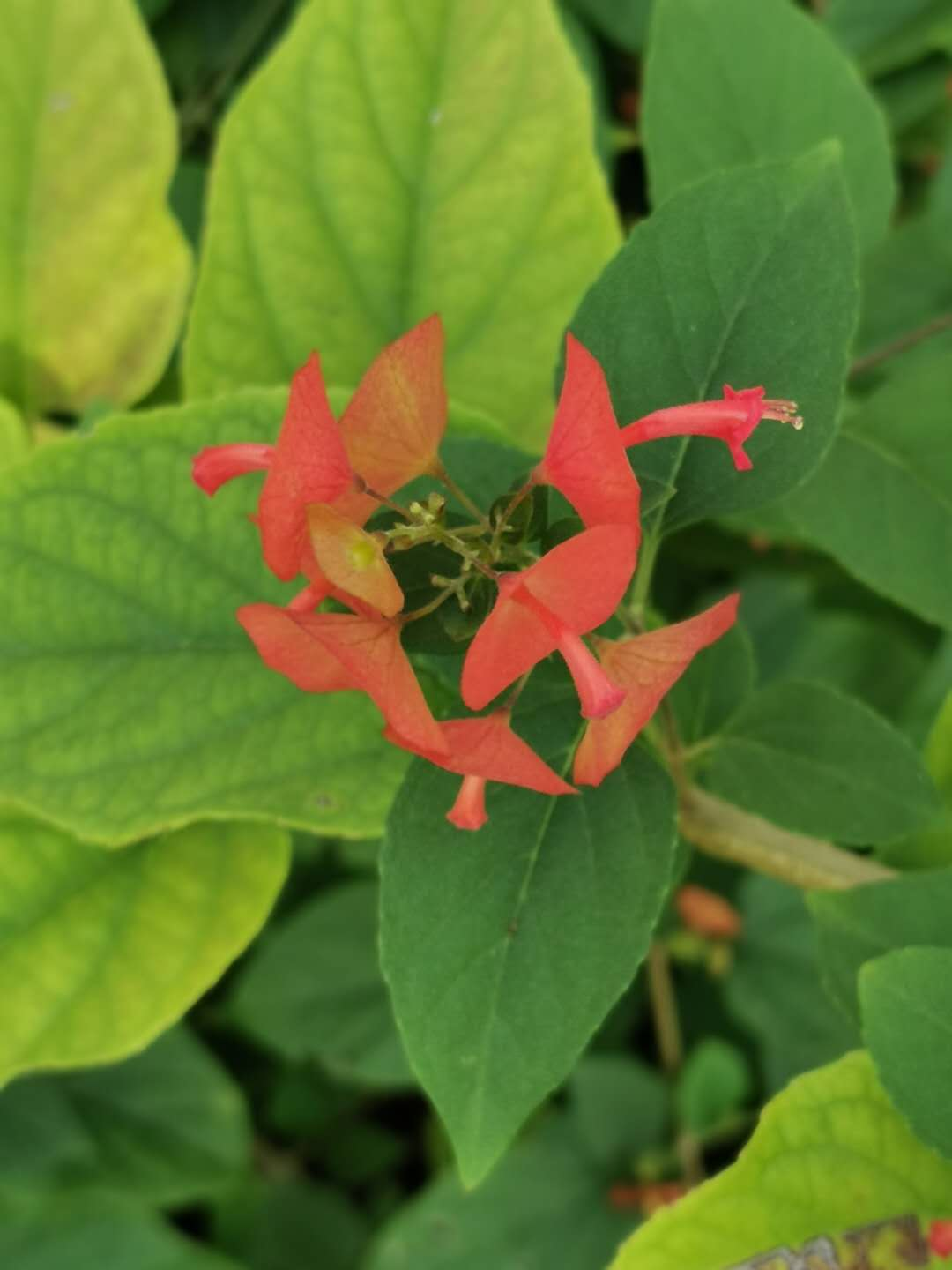
Cyme axillary

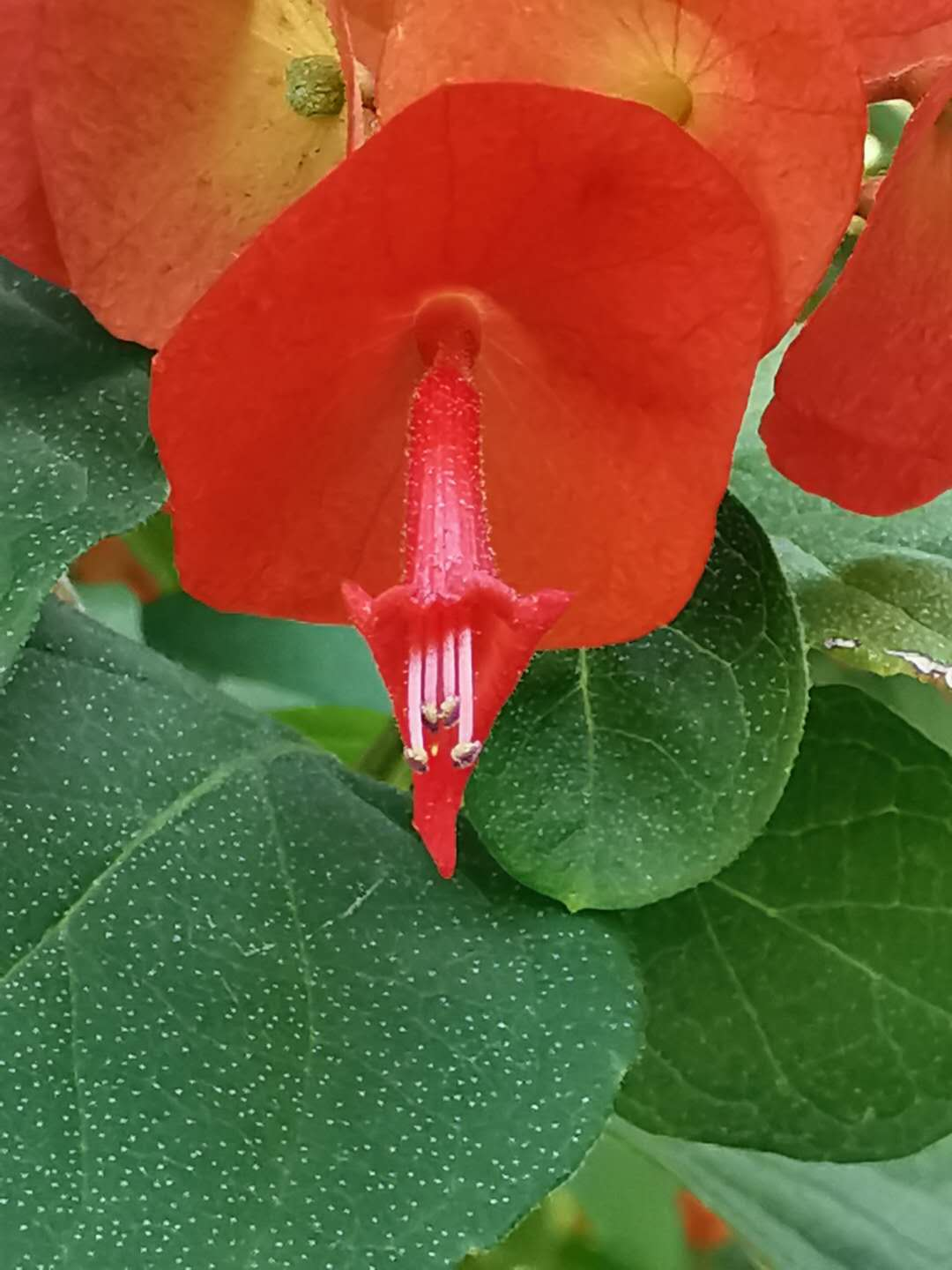
Calyx and flower

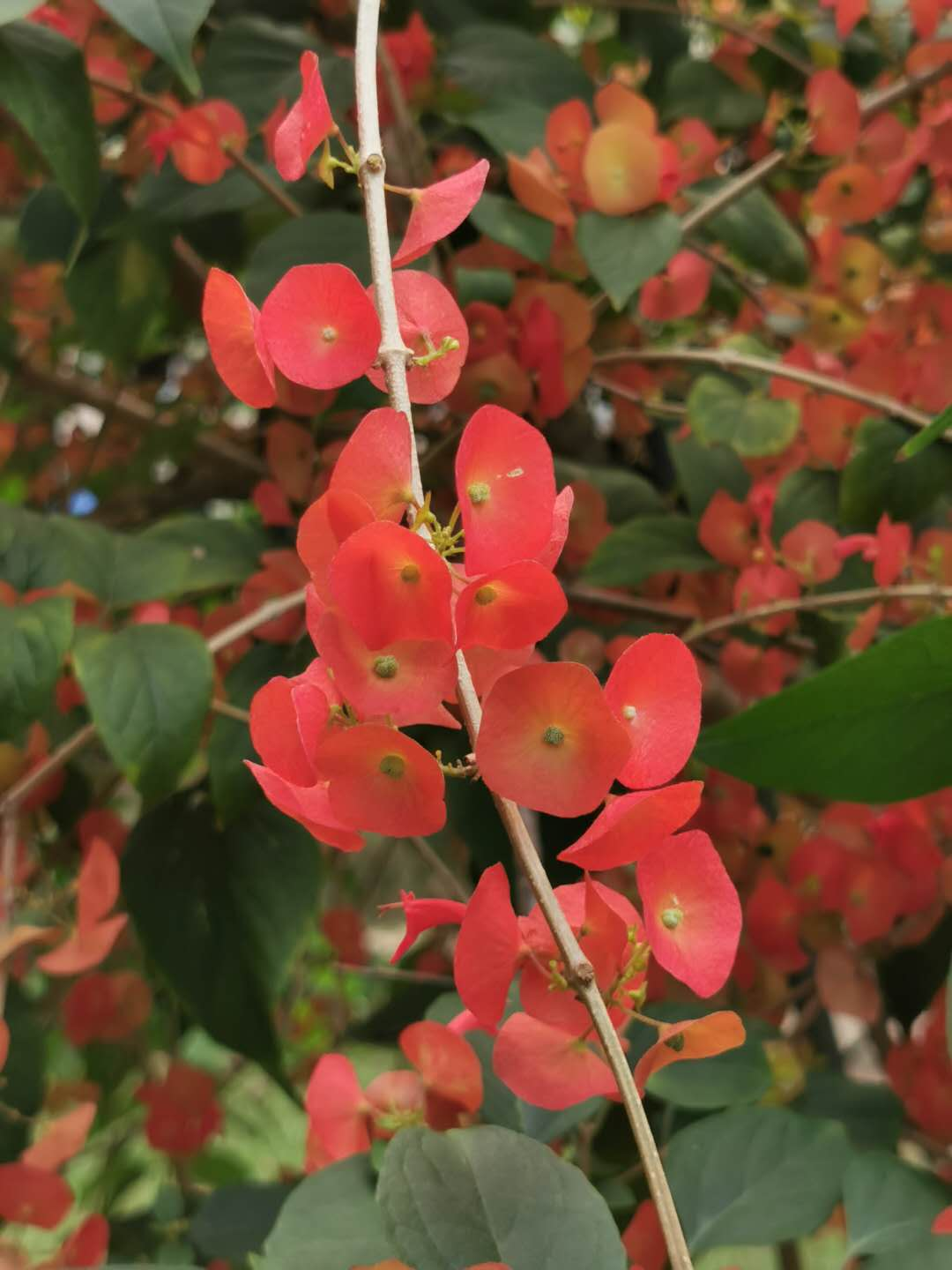
Calyx persistent
