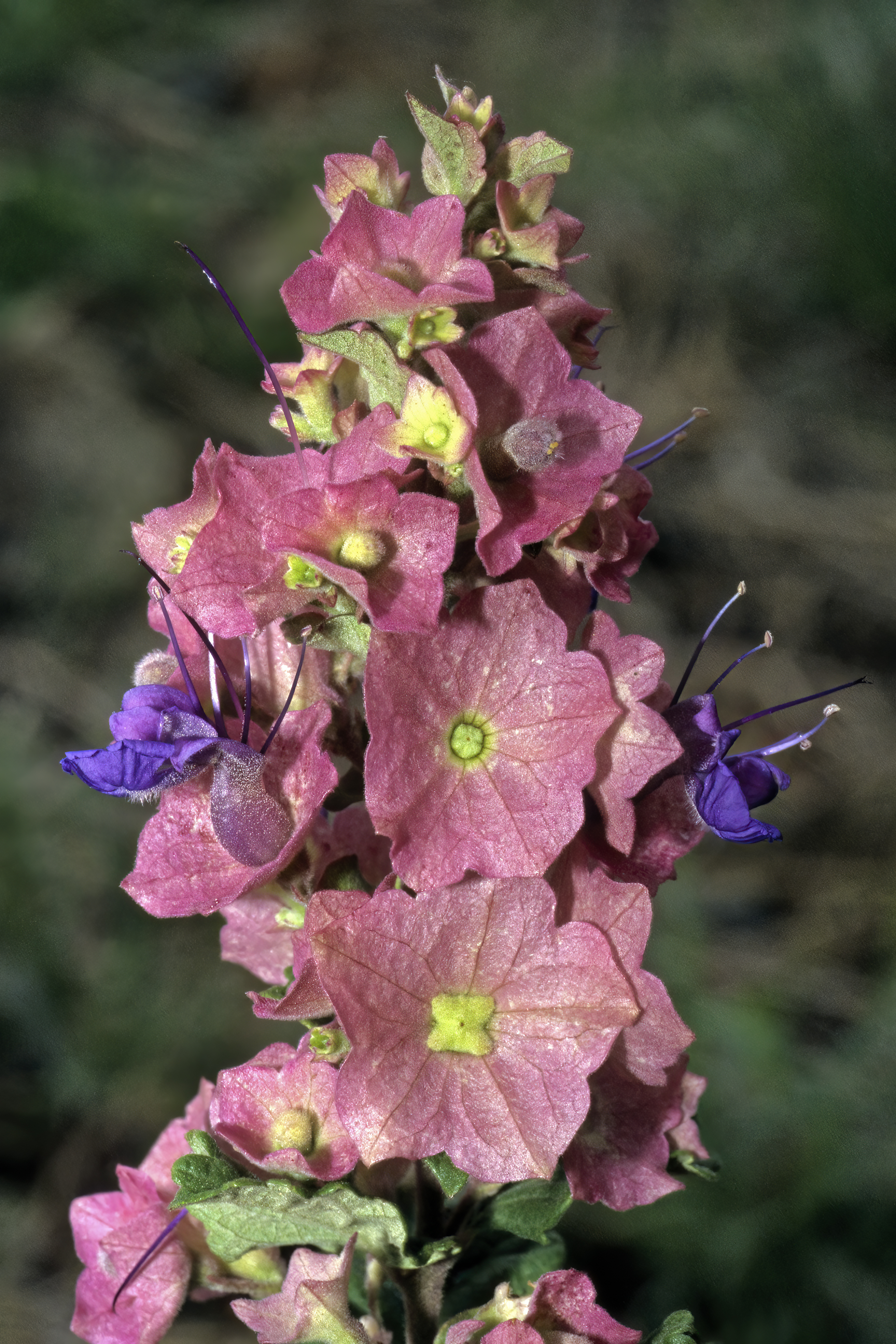
- In Sekhukhuneland, South Africa

Conservation status
- Least Concern (IUCN 3.1)

Scientific classification
- Kingdom: Plantae
- Clade: Tracheophytes
- Clade: Angiosperms
- Clade: Eudicots
- Clade: Asterids
- Order: Lamiales
- Family: Lamiaceae
- Genus: Karomia
- Species: K. speciosa

Binomial name
- Karomia speciosa (Hutch. & Corbishley) R.Fern.

Synonyms
- Holmskioldia speciosa Hutch. & Corbishley; Holmskioldia tettensis f. alba Moldenke; Holmskioldia tettensis f. flava Moldenke; Karomia speciosa f. alba (Moldenke) R.Fern.; Karomia speciosa f. flava (Moldenke) R.Fern.

= Karomia speciosa =

Species of shrub

Karomia speciosa is an African deciduous large shrub or bushy tree up to 7 m, and relocated to the family Lamiaceae from Verbenaceae. It is one of nine species in the genus Karomia, a genus containing species previously classified in Holmskioldia, and is closely related to Clerodendrum. The only remaining species in the genus is Holmskioldia sanguinea, occurring in the foothills of the Himalayas.

Karomia speciosa is found in the northern parts of South Africa, Eswatini and north into tropical Africa and Madagascar, growing in bush or wooded areas on hot, dry, rocky slopes and riverine thickets. Producing showy, mauve and purple flowers in profusion, the species is either single- or multi-stemmed, with pale, smooth grayish-brown bark. The softly pubescent leaves have coarsely toothed margins, are dark green above and a paler green below. The papery calyx is dusty-pink or mauve in colour, while the bilabiate corolla is deep-blue or violet.

Branchlets woody, terete, shortly and softly pubescent, marked with pale lenticels; internodes about 2 cm. long. Leaves broadly ovate, triangular at the apex, broadly wedge-shaped at the base, 2-5-4 cm. long, 2-3 cm. broad, coarsely crenate, with few (about three) rounded teeth, very shortly setulose above, paler below and conspicuously glandular and shortly pubescent; lateral nerves about three on each side of the midrib; petiole 7 mm. long, densely pubescent. Flowers few, arranged in axillary cymes about 4 cm. long; peduncles slender, softly pubescent; lower bracts more or less leafy, spathulate-obovate, up to 7 mm. long; pedicels up to 1.2 cm. long, with two small opposite linear bracteoles above the middle. Calyx pink-coloured, gradually enlarging, broadly top-shaped, glandular-pubescent outside; tube 1 cm. long, with broadly rounded lobes, the latter rigidly membranous in the fruiting stage and expanding to 25 cm. Corolla purple, 2-2.5 cm. long, glandular and softly pubescent outside; tube up to 1.5 cm. long. Stamens long exserted; filaments glabrous. Ovary hairy in the upper part; style a little longer than the stamens, slender, glabrous. Fruit truncate, 4-horned, included by the accrescent calyx.

— J. Hutchinson
