= Langham Dale =

English-born educator in South Africa (1826–1898)

Sir Langham Dale
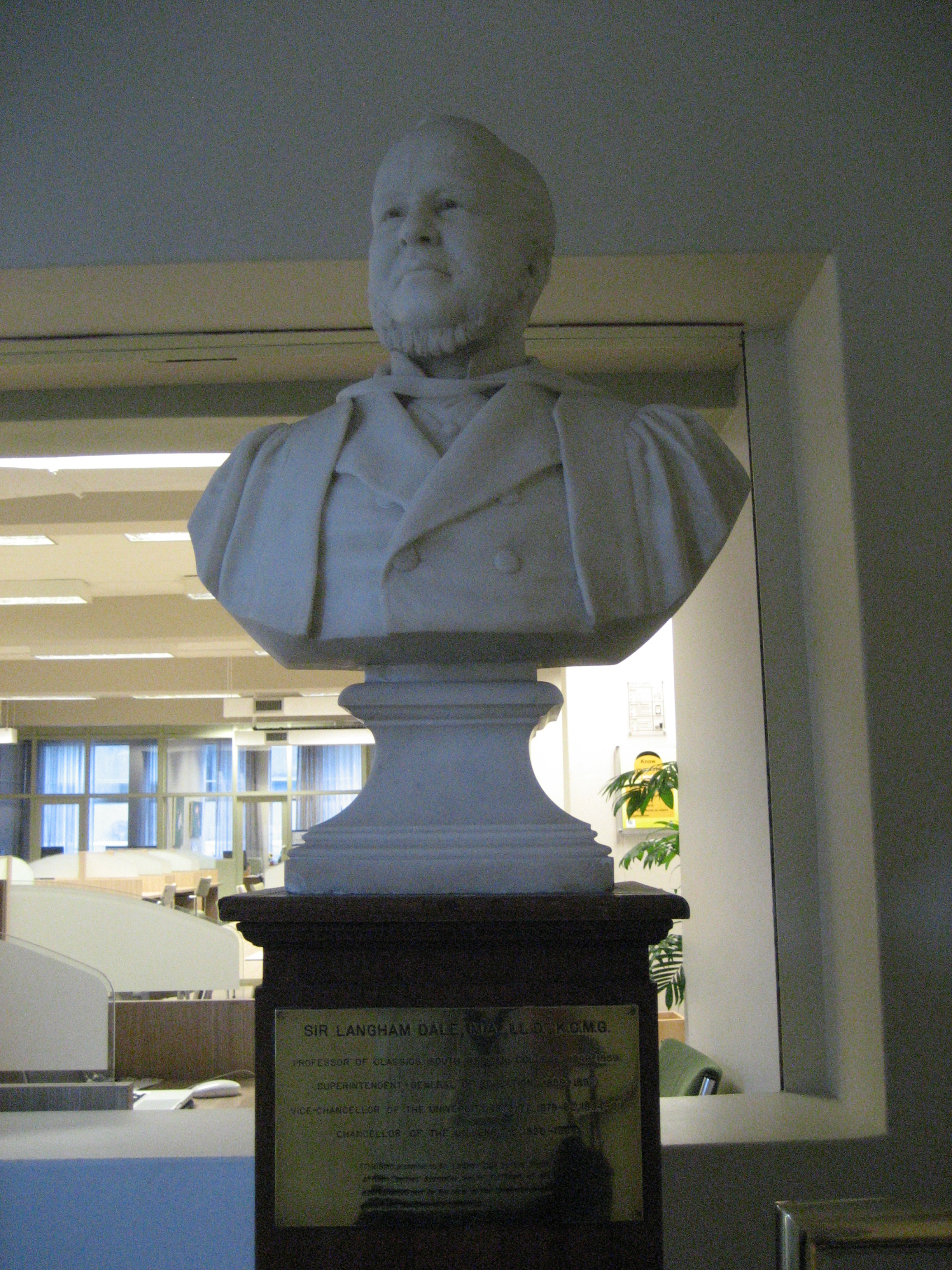
- Sir Langham Dale

2nd [[Superintendent-General of Education for the Cape Colony]]
- In office 1859–1892
- Preceded by: James Rose Innes
- Succeeded by: Sir Thomas Muir

Personal details
- Born: 22 May 1826 Kingsclere, Hampshire, England
- Died: 12 January 1898 (aged 71) Mowbray, Cape Colony
- Spouse: Emma Ross (m. 1849)
- Children: 6
- Education: Christ's Hospital
- Alma mater: The Queen's College, Oxford
- Occupation: Educator; colonial administrator
- Known for: Founding the University of the Cape of Good Hope
- Awards: Knight Bachelor (1895)

Sir Langham Dale (22 May 1826 – 12 January 1898) was an English-born educator who served as the Cape Colony's second Superintendent-General of Education from 1859 to 1892. He was instrumental in the establishment of the University of the Cape of Good Hope and, over a tenure of more than three decades, played a central role in shaping the colony's education system. That system was racially differentiated in practice, and Dale's official reports expressed the racial and "poor white" preoccupations of the period, including concern that the schooling of Africans was outpacing that of impoverished whites.

== Early life and education ==
Dale was born on 22 May 1826 at Kingsclere, Hampshire, England, the son of Henry Dale, registrar of Kingsclere, and Mary Ann Stroud. He attended Christ's Hospital in London before receiving a bursary to study at The Queen's College, Oxford. He graduated in 1847 with second-class honours in mathematics.

== Academic and educational career ==
On the recommendation of the astronomer Sir John Herschel, Dale was appointed professor of English and classics at the South African College in Cape Town in 1848, succeeding Professor Changuion. Finding the college in disorder, he clashed with Dr Adamson—who had temporarily held the English and mathematics chairs—and in 1849 appealed to Governor Sir Harry Smith to reform it. After Adamson resigned in 1850, Dale overhauled the curriculum and teaching, remaining professor until 1858.

After receiving an honorary doctorate from the University of Glasgow during a visit to England in 1858, Dale returned in 1859 to succeed James Rose Innes as Superintendent-General of Education for the Cape Colony (1859–1892). He chaired the Board of Public Examiners from 1859 to 1872 and proposed replacing it with a degree-granting body; the University of the Cape of Good Hope was accordingly founded in June 1873, with Dale as its first Vice-Chancellor and, from 1890, its Chancellor.

Beyond his official posts, Dale chaired the Cape Public Service Commission (1886–87), was a Fellow of the Royal Geographical Society, and wrote on scientific, classical, and literary subjects for the Cape Monthly Magazine. An amateur antiquarian, he collected Stone Age artefacts from the Cape Flats, contributing to the early archaeology of southern Africa. He served as a trustee of the South African Public Library for over thirty years and on the committees of the Fine Arts Association and the Botanical Garden.

== Views on race and education ==
Although the Cape Colony is sometimes remembered for a comparatively liberal, "colour-blind" tradition, historians have noted that its education system was racially differentiated in practice and that its administrators shared the white-supremacist assumptions of the era. Dale's long tenure as Superintendent-General coincided with the growth of a separate network of mission schools that gave limited schooling to a minority of Black South Africans, alongside the schools attended by white and "Coloured" children.

In his official reports Dale gave voice to the contemporary anxiety over the so-called "poor white" question, framing the education of Africans as a threat to the standing of impoverished whites. Towards the end of the nineteenth century he complained of the "insult to our common Christianity" that "native heathen races" should receive schooling while, in his words, "we overlook our own stock and blood degenerating into the grossest ignorance and lowest habits of life".

Dale's successor as Superintendent-General, Sir Thomas Muir, went on to design the Cape School Board Act of 1905, which made higher elementary education compulsory for white children only and is regarded as having institutionalised racial segregation in Cape schooling. Such measures formed part of the longer trajectory of racially segregated education in South Africa that culminated in the Bantu Education Act, 1953.

== Retirement and honours ==
Dale retired in 1892. The Cape Parliament granted him a pension equal to his full salary in recognition of his contribution to colonial education. His successor as Superintendent-General was Sir Thomas Muir. In 1895 he was created a Knight Bachelor for his services to education.

Dale College Boys' High School in King William's Town, founded in 1861, was later named in his honour.

== Family ==
In 1849, Dale married Emma Ross at Rondebosch, Cape Colony. She was the daughter of Thomas Ross of the 60th Regiment of Foot. The couple had six children.

== Death ==
Sir Langham Dale died on 12 January 1898 at Mowbray, Cape Town, aged 71.

== Legacy ==
Dale is remembered as one of the formative figures in South African education, and institutions including Dale College Boys' High School bear his name. His reforms at the South African College, his role in founding the University of the Cape of Good Hope, and his long tenure as Superintendent-General left a lasting institutional legacy. More critical assessments situate that legacy within the racially stratified character of colonial Cape education and the white-supremacist views Dale himself articulated.
