= Thomas Muir =

Thomas Muir may refer to:

- Thomas Muir (mathematician) (1844–1934), Scottish mathematician
- Thomas Muir of Huntershill (1765–1799), political reformer, leader of the Scottish "Friends of the People Society"
