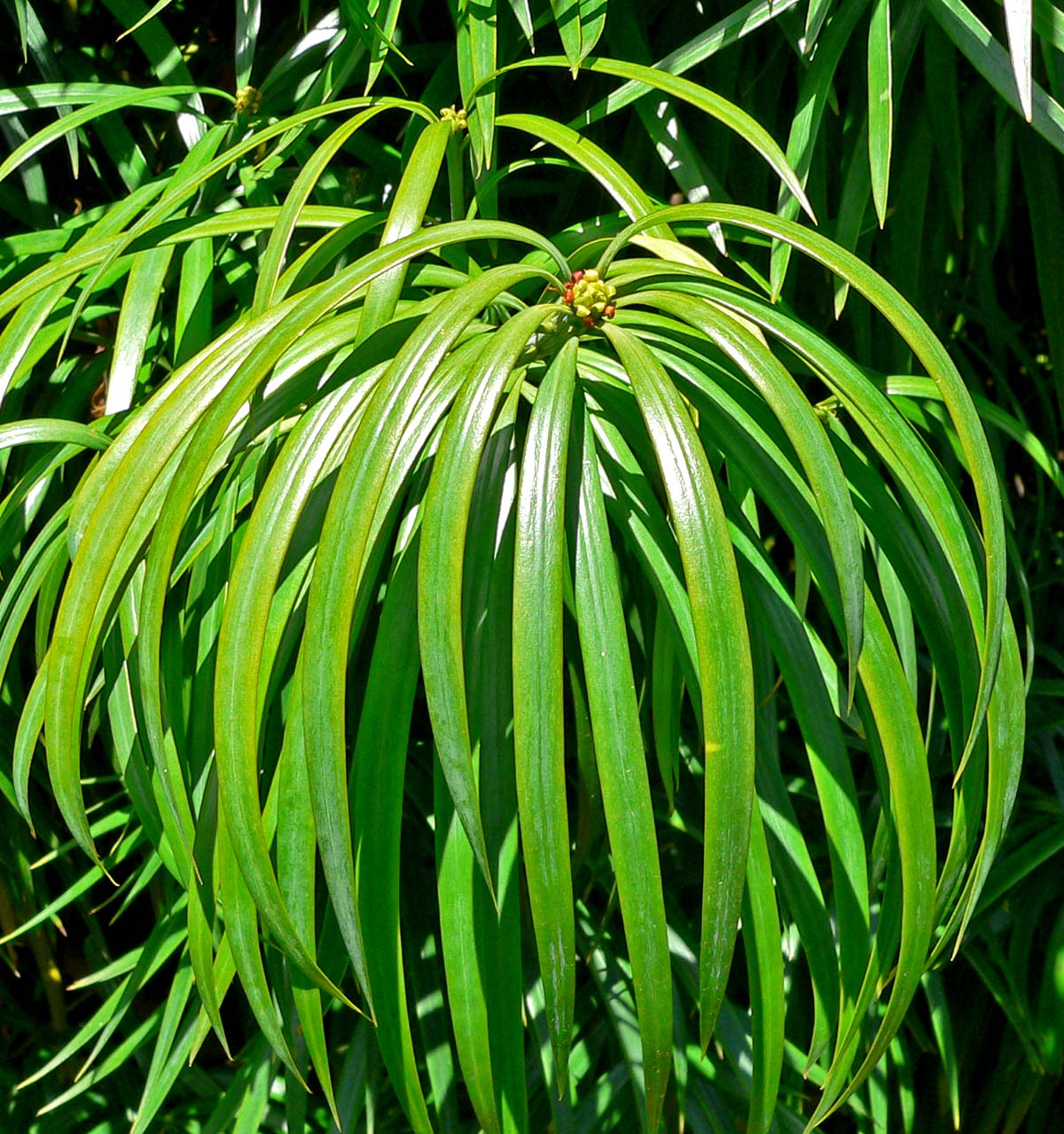

Conservation status
- Endangered (IUCN 3.1)

Scientific classification
- Kingdom: Plantae
- Clade: Tracheophytes
- Clade: Gymnosperms
- Division: Pinophyta
- Class: Pinopsida
- Order: Araucariales
- Family: Podocarpaceae
- Genus: Podocarpus
- Species: P. henkelii

Binomial name
- Podocarpus henkelii Stapf ex Dallim. & A.B.Jacks (1923)

Synonyms
- Podocarpus ensiculus Melville (1954 publ. 1955); Podocarpus henkelii subsp. ensiculus (Melville) Silba (2010)

= Podocarpus henkelii =

Henkel's yellowwood

Species of tree

Podocarpus henkelii (Henkel's yellowwood, Afrikaans: Henkel-se-Geelhout, Xhosa: Umsonti, Zulu: Umsonti) is a South African species of conifer in the family Podocarpaceae. It is grown ornamentally in gardens for its neat, attractive form and its elegant, drooping foliage.

== Description ==
It can easily be distinguished from its close relatives by its long, slender, drooping leaves. It has a straight, well-formed trunk and naturally assumes a pyramid-shape as it grows, eventually becoming very tall, about 30 metres (100 feet).

Like all yellowwoods, this tree is dioecious, with separate male and female trees. As conifers they produce cones, although it is their fruit-like seeds that are most prominent. These seeds are eaten and distributed by birds. The fleshy coating of the seed contains a germination inhibitor so being eaten actually helps germination by removing this coating. It is exhibits a level of drought tolerance.

== Distribution ==
Henkel's yellowwood is found in KwaZulu-Natal and Eastern Cape provinces of South Africa. Here it grows in the high, moist, afro-montane forest of the Drakensberg mountains. It also grows in Afromontane forests in Malawi, Tanzania, and Zimbabwe. It is now found in gardens throughout South Africa, where it is grown as an elegant ornamental tree.

It is a protected tree in South Africa. Although it is the real yellowwood tree that is officially South Africa's national tree, the yellowwoods as a group – including Henkel's yellowwood – are felt to hold that position in practise.

== Name and cultivation ==
This tree was named after Caesar Carl Hans Henkel (1839–1913), the Eastern Cape forester, and father of John Spurgeon Henkel, Conservator of Forests for Natal and Zululand.

Podocarpus henkelii is increasingly grown in gardens around southern Africa for its neat, attractive form and decorative foliage. It is easy to cultivate, tough once established, and incredibly long-lived. It can also be pruned if necessary, to change its shape. However, although it is mildly frost and drought resistant, it is healthiest (and grows fastest) when planted in deep, moist soils.

It can be propagated from seed, which should be planted promptly in a moist, semi-shade position. The fleshy fruit that surrounds the seed must be removed as this inhibits germination. The seed is also vulnerable to fungal infection.

Henkel's yellowwood is a protected tree in South Africa.

== Potential uses ==
Acetone and methanol extracts of Podocarpus henkelii have shown activity against canine distemper virus and lumpy skin disease virus.

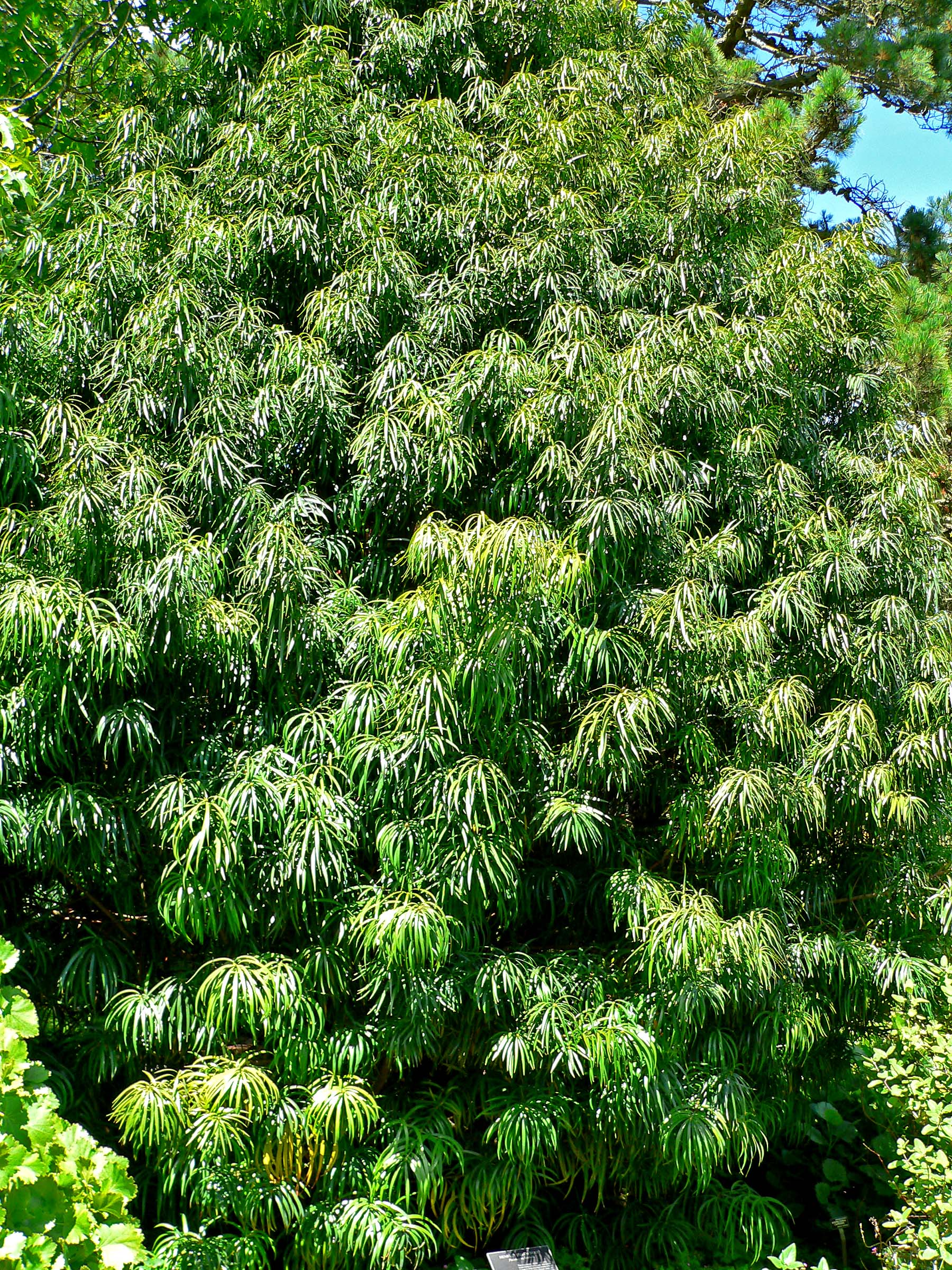
A medium-sized Henkels yellowwood

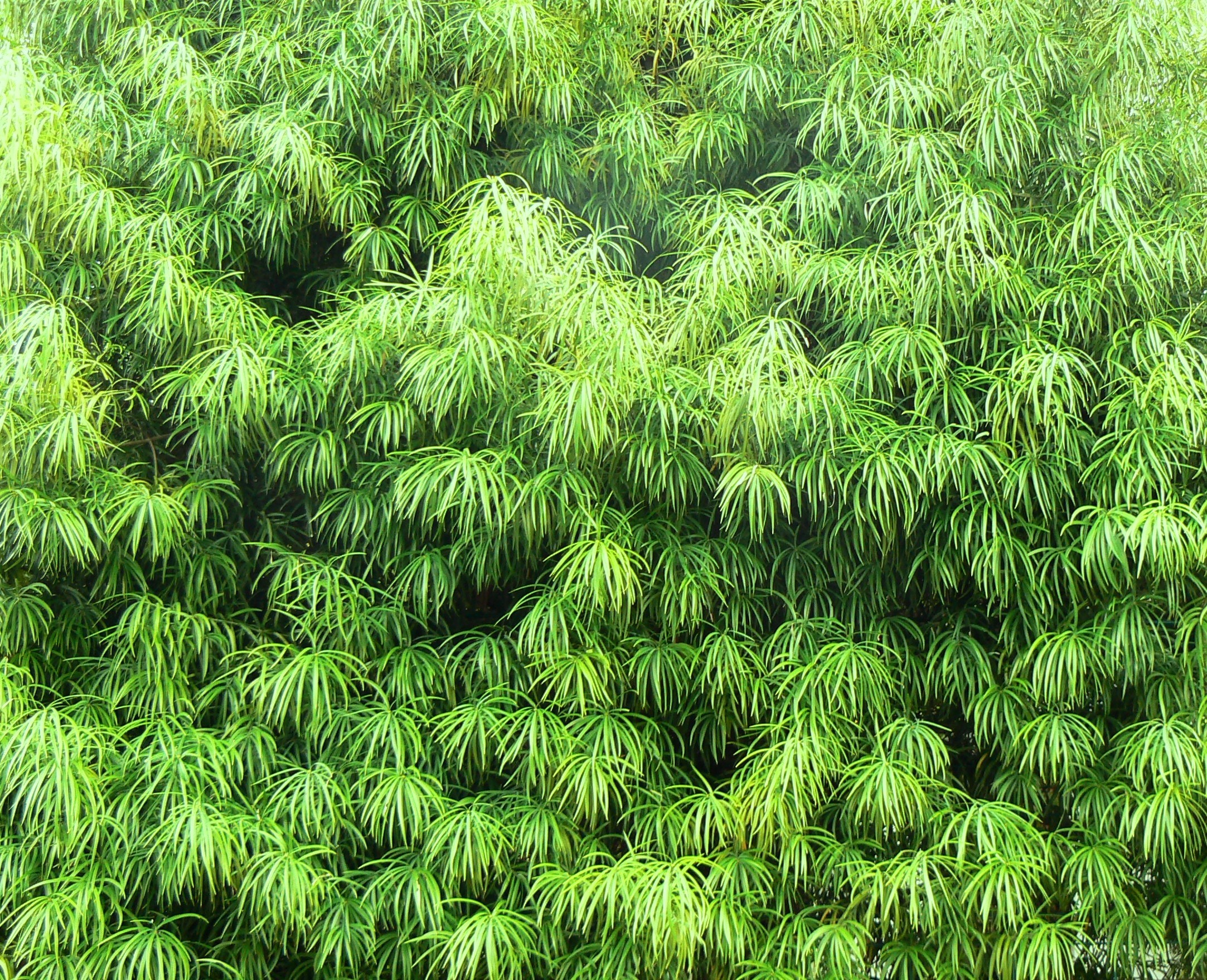
Henkels yellowwood foliage
