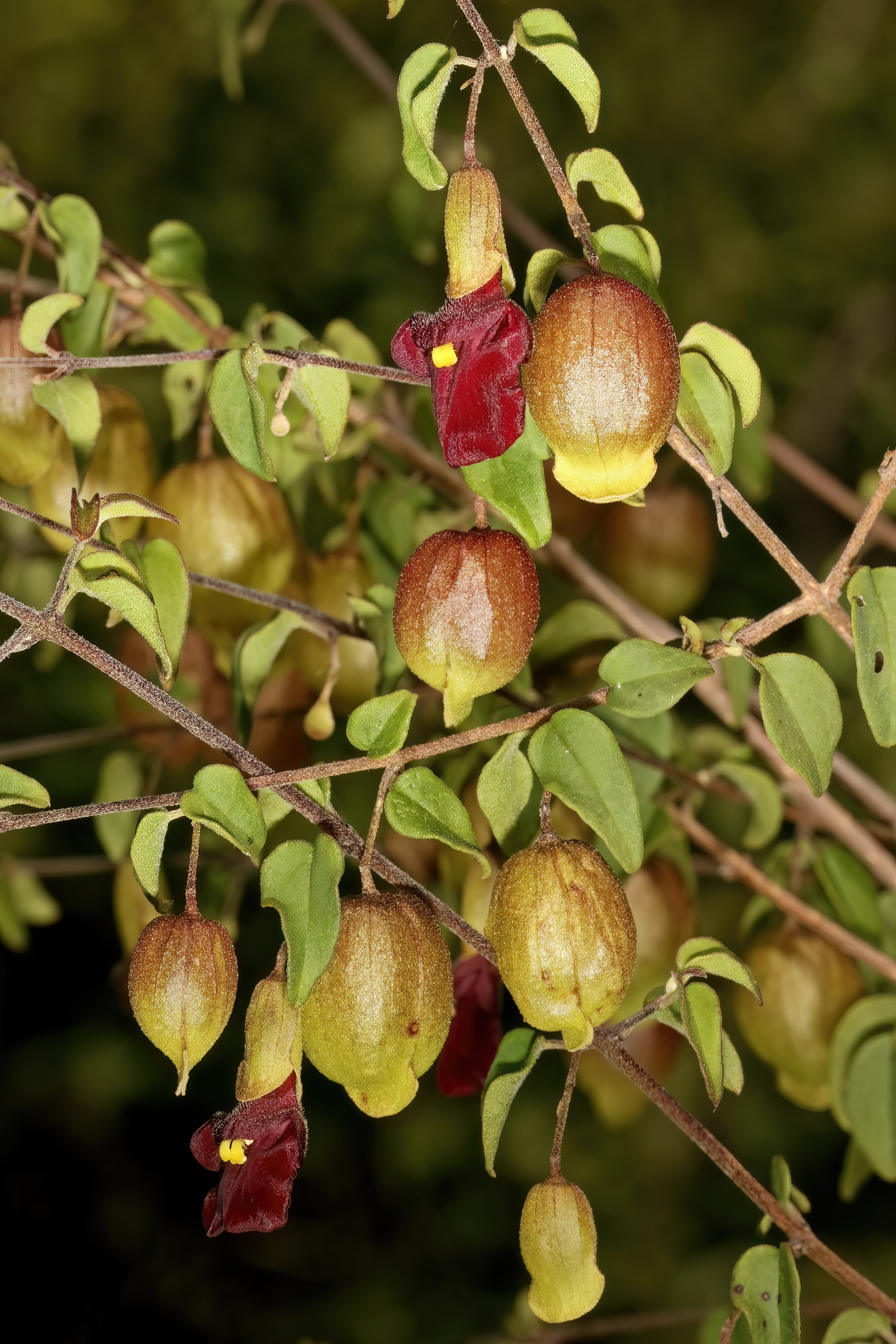

Conservation status
- Least Concern (SANBI Red List)

Scientific classification
- Kingdom: Plantae
- Clade: Tracheophytes
- Clade: Angiosperms
- Clade: Eudicots
- Clade: Asterids
- Order: Lamiales
- Family: Lamiaceae
- Genus: Tinnea
- Species: T. rhodesiana

Binomial name
- Tinnea rhodesiana S.Moore

= Tinnea rhodesiana =

Species of flowering plant

Tinnea rhodesiana, commonly called the brown sunbell, is a species of flowering plant in the family Lamiaceae. It is found across much of southern Africa.

== Description ==
This species is a twiggy, soft shrub growing about 0.6–2.5 m (2 ft 0 in – 8 ft 2 in) tall. The branches are pale brown and finely hairy when young, often becoming smoother with age. The leaves are borne on short stalks and are somewhat leathery, ovate to ovate-lanceolate, usually 8–20 mm (0.31–0.79 in) long (occasionally to 30 mm (1.2 in)), darker above and paler beneath, with small glandular dots on the lower surface and smooth margins.

The flowers are produced in a loose inflorescence 50–100 mm (2.0–3.9 in) long at the tips of branches and short side shoots, usually one or two per whorl. The calyx enlarges in fruit to form an inflated, straw-coloured, ovoid structure 12–18 mm (0.47–0.71 in) long. The corolla is chocolate-brown to purplish, violet-scented, and 14–18 mm (0.55–0.71 in) long, with a broad, three-lobed lower lip. The fruit consists of nutlets 5–7 mm (0.20–0.28 in) long, each with a broadly elliptical wing about 8 mm × 6 mm (0.31 in × 0.24 in).

=== Identification ===
Tinnea rhodesiana can be distinguished from Tinnea galpinii by its taller, more upright, and more twiggy habitand its flowers are typically produced singly on short lateral shoots rather than in terminal clusters. It can be separated from Tinnea aethiopica by its pubescent nutlets and the smooth, cylindrical nature of its branches.

== Distribution and habitat ==
Tinnea rhodesiana grows on stony hillsides in dry, open woodland in Angola, Zambia, Botswana, Zimbabwe, Mozambique, northern Namibia, and South Africa′s Limpopo and Mpumalanga provinces.

== Etymology ==
The species epithet means ″of Rhodesia″, a colonial name for a region covering modern Zimbabwe and, at times, Zambia.

== See also ==
- List of Lamiaceae of South Africa
