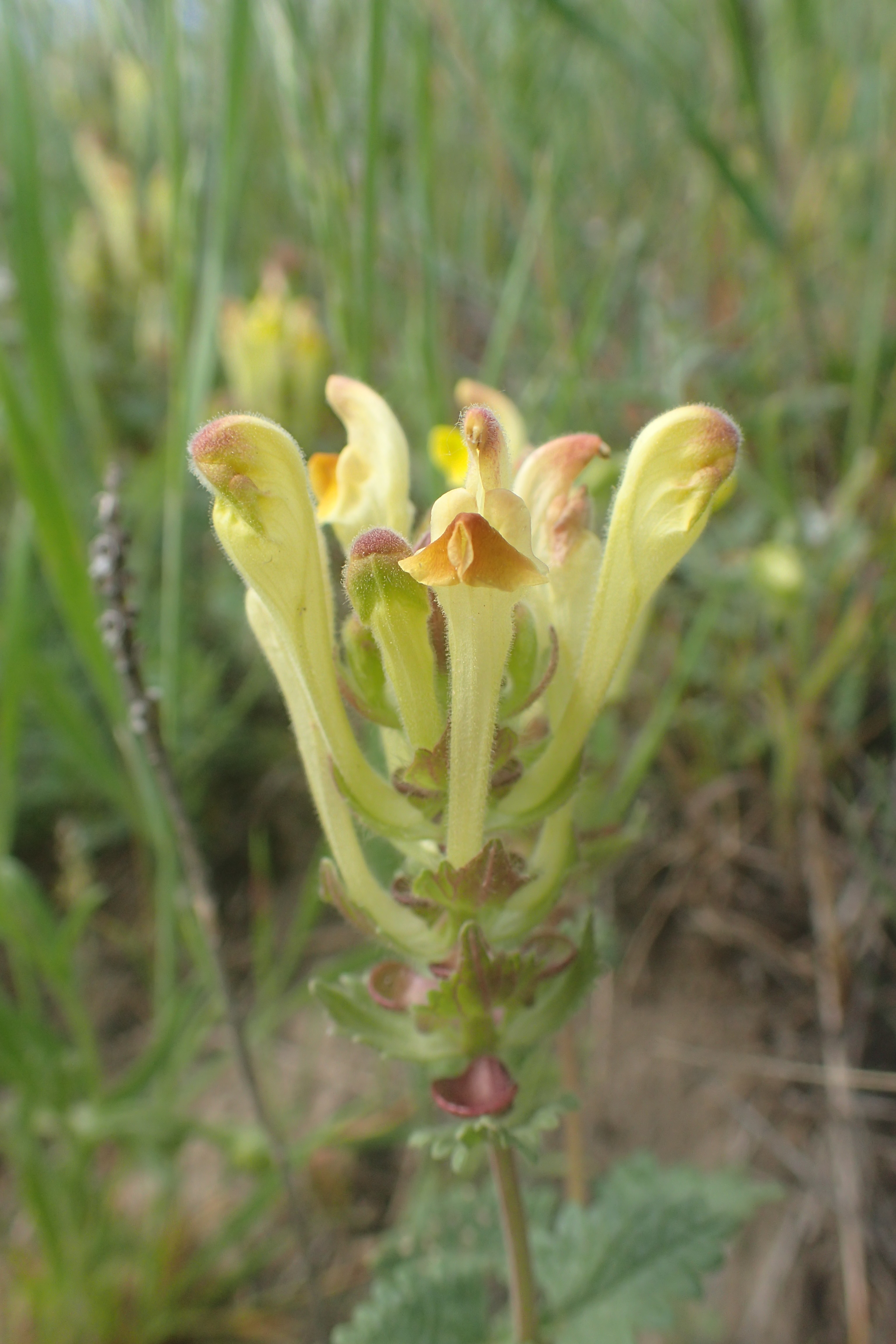
- Scutellaria orientalis

Scientific classification
- Kingdom: Plantae
- Clade: Tracheophytes
- Clade: Angiosperms
- Clade: Eudicots
- Clade: Asterids
- Order: Lamiales
- Family: Lamiaceae
- Subfamily: Scutellarioideae; Prantl

= Scutellarioideae =

Subfamily of flowering plants in the sage family

Scutellarioideae is a subfamily of plants in the family Lamiaceae.

Genera include:

- Holmskioldia
- Renschia
- Scutellaria
- Tinnea
- Wenchengia
