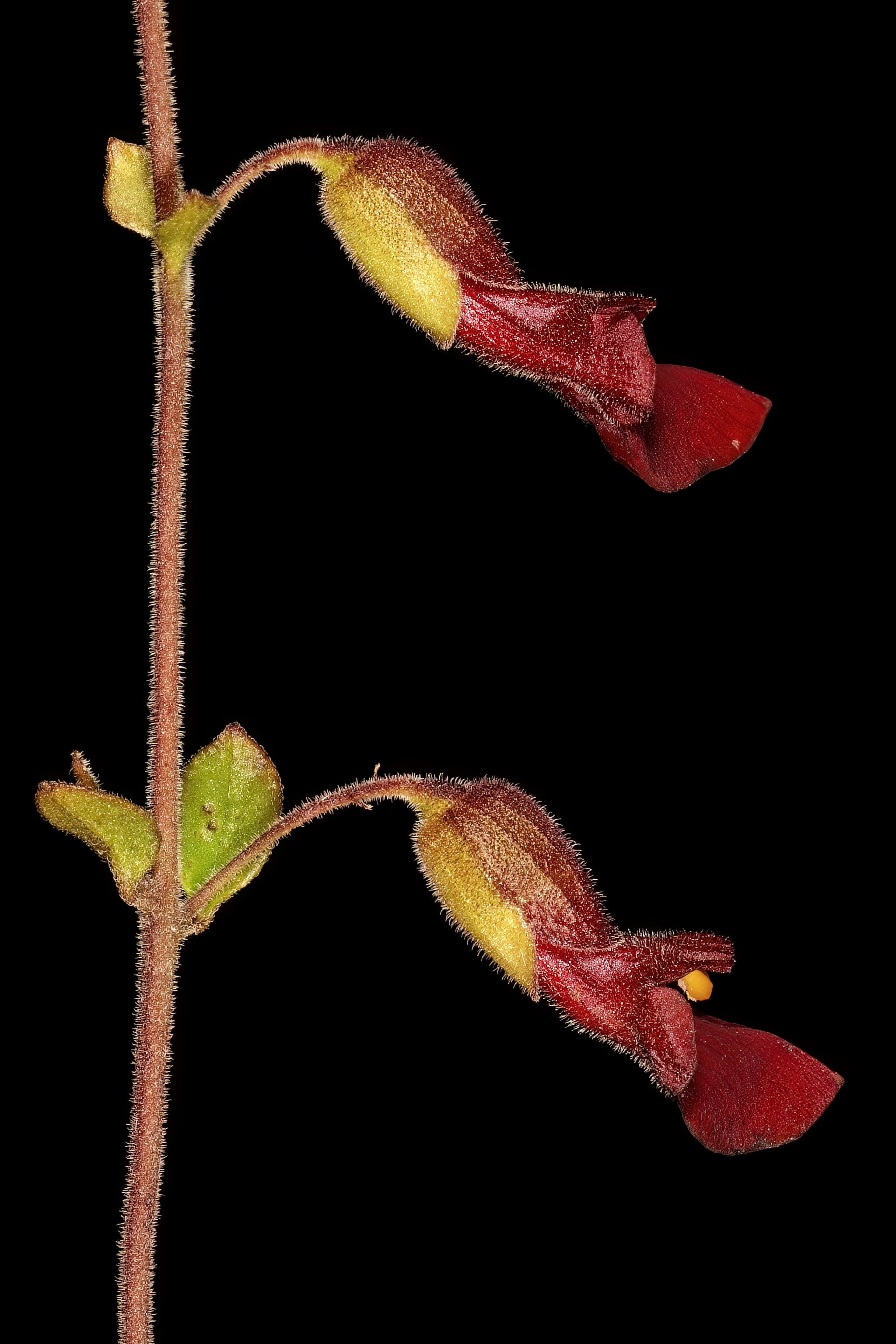

Conservation status
- Least Concern (SANBI Red List)

Scientific classification
- Kingdom: Plantae
- Clade: Tracheophytes
- Clade: Angiosperms
- Clade: Eudicots
- Clade: Asterids
- Order: Lamiales
- Family: Lamiaceae
- Genus: Tinnea
- Species: T. galpinii

Binomial name
- Tinnea galpinii Briq.

= Tinnea galpinii =

Species of flowering plant

Tinnea galpinii, commonly called the Cape sunbell, is a species of flowering plant in the family Lamiaceae. It is found in South Africa, Eswatini, and Mozambique.

== Description ==
This species is a low, spreading to slightly upright shrub growing from a woody base, reaching about 150–600 mm (5.9–23.6 in) high. The stems are few to several, softly woody and only lightly branched. The leaves are small and firm-textured, borne on very short stalks or almost without stalks, and are elliptic-lanceolate to ovate in shape, measuring about 15–25 mm (0.59–0.98 in) long and 6–10 mm (0.24–0.39 in) wide. They have smooth margins, blunt to slightly pointed tips, and are covered on both surfaces with fine hairs and small glands.

The flowering spike is loose and unbranched, borne at the tip of the stem, and 80–200 mm (3.1–7.9 in) long, with many well-spaced whorls, each usually containing two flowers. The flowers are dark maroon to chocolate-coloured and have a violet-like scent. The calyx is densely hairy and gland-dotted, becoming inflated and egg-shaped as the fruit develops, about 10–14 mm (0.39–0.55 in) long and 8–10 mm (0.31–0.39 in) wide, with rounded lobes. The corolla is finely hairy, with a tube 6–9 mm (0.24–0.35 in) long and a three-lobed lower lip. The fruit is a smooth to slightly hairy nutlet about 5–6 mm (0.20–0.24 in) long, surrounded by a broad, elliptical wing.

=== Identification ===
Tinnea galpinii can be distinguished from Tinnea rhodesiana by its smaller size and softer habit, with suberect to spreading stems that are only lightly branched and more densely hairy, especially on the calyx. Its flowers are borne in slender, terminal inflorescences.

== Distribution and habitat ==
Tinnea galpinii grows among rocks in mountain grassland in Mpumalanga, extending along the Lebombo Mountains to Eswatini, down into Kwazulu-Natal, and along the coast to around the Mtentu River in Pondoland, Eastern Cape.

== See also ==
- List of Lamiaceae of South Africa
