= Caesar Carl Hans Henkel =

South African artist (1839–1913)

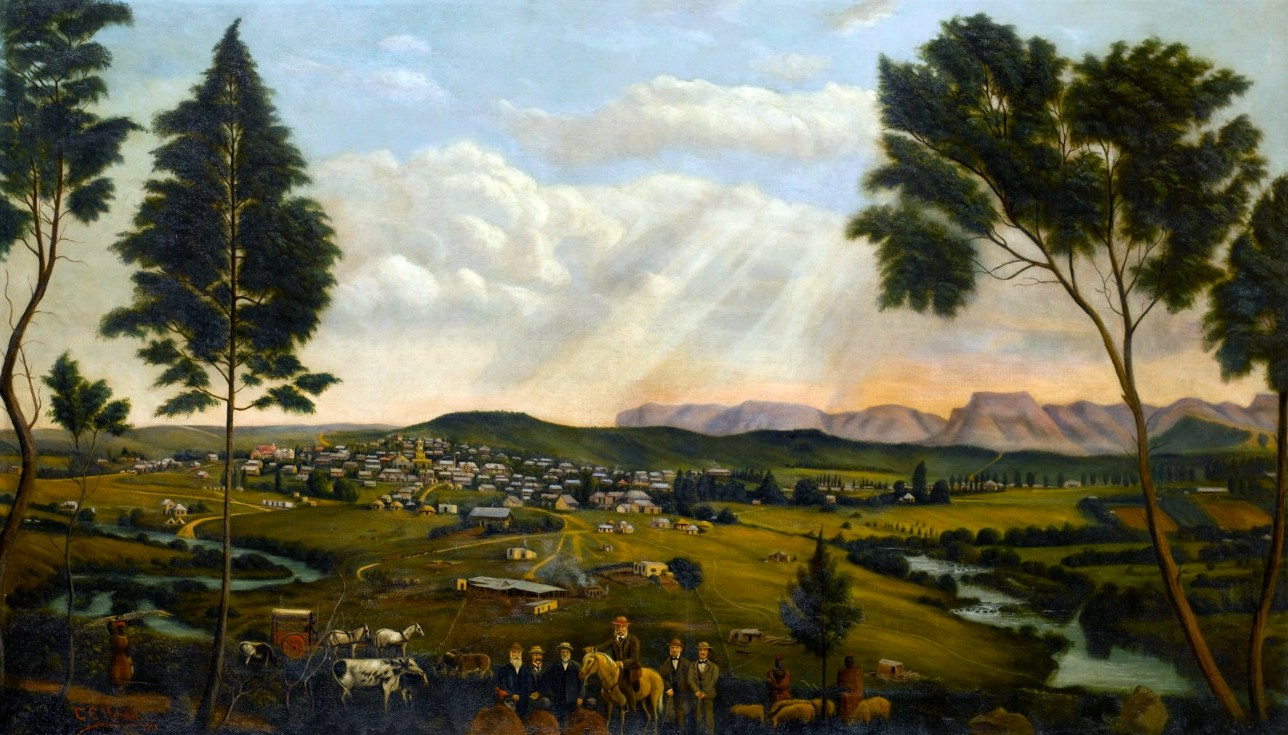
Panoramic view of Umtata and the Drakensberg (1913) by Caesar Henkel

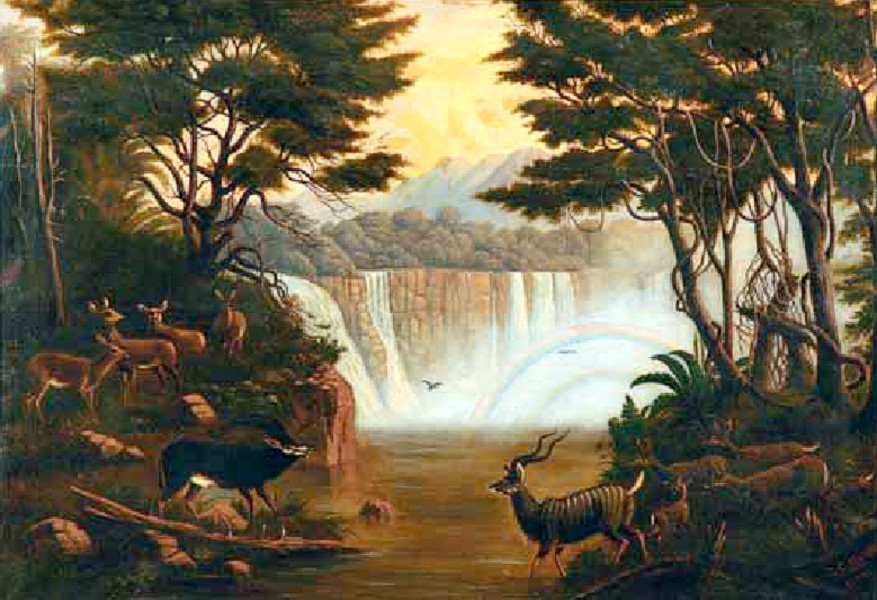
Gathering of Buck by a Waterfall (1899) by Caesar Henkel

Caesar Carl Wilhelm Hans Henkel (1837 Fulda, Hesse - 16 June 1913 Umtata), was a German-born South African forester, cartographer, painter, soldier and botanist. He was the father of John Spurgeon Henkel.

Henkel came from an old and distinguished German military family. He enlisted as an officer in the British-German Legion during the Crimean War. The war having ended before the British-German Legion saw any action, Henkel settled in the Eastern Cape in 1856, where he acted as secretary to the commanding officer Baron Richard von Stutterheim (1809-1872) and played a major role in settling German immigrants in the King William's Town area.

Returning from service in the Indian Mutiny, Henkel filled various administrative posts in the Eastern Cape between 1860-75. He proved to be an extremely competent cartographer in the office of the surveyor-general between 1876–83; his map of the Transkei then regarded as the definitive work. Thereafter he worked as forester in the districts of Stockenstrom and King William's Town. He was finally appointed chief forest officer and stationed at Umtata and was responsible for the conservation of indigenous forests and for the development of commercial forestry in the Transkei. His pioneering work in these fields greatly influenced the course taken by forestry practice in South Africa. Henkel inaugurated a policy of establishing exotic wattle plantations throughout the Transkei in order to reduce exploitation of the indigenous forests.

On his retirement, he became a town councillor of Umtata and started importing useful and rare trees and shrubs which he planted on his estate, "The Pines", outside Umtata. Here he also started the first fish hatchery of the country. His name is commemorated in Podocarpus henkelii. Some of his paintings are kept at the East London Museum, the Africana Museum in Johannesburg and the History Museum in Grahamstown.

== Personal ==
Caesar Henkel married Auguste Radue (30 November 1850 Arnswalde - 6 October 1928) and they raised a family of 6 sons and 6 daughters:

- John Spurgeon Henkel (1871-1962) x Juanita NN xx Ethel Mary NN
- Paul Louis Henkel
- Maria Josephina Ida Henkel x Fritz Wilhelm Waldemar Borchers
- Martha Charlotte Henkel
- Philip Carl Henkel
- Anna Henkel
- Ida Pauline Henkel (died in infancy)
- Benjamin Henkel (1881-1947) x Winifred Maud Hawken (1886-1970)
- James Henkel (1882-1964) x Rhoda NN (1888-1958)
- Jemima Henkel
- Charles Frederick Henkel (1886-1946)
- Josephine August Henkel x Burton Alexander Nicol (1870-1937)

== Publications ==
- Tree Planting for Ornamental and Economic Purposes in the Transkeian Territories - 1894
- History, Resources and Products of the Country between Cape Colony and Natal, or Kaffraria proper - 1903
- The Native or Transkeian Territories - Hamburg, 1903
