= John Spurgeon Henkel =

South African botanist and forester (1871 - 1962)

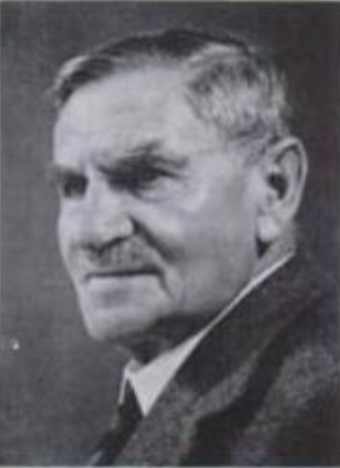
- Born: Johannes Elias Spurgeon Henkel; 1871; Peddie, Cape Colony
- Died: 5 April 1962 (Age 91); Pietermaritzburg
- Education: Dale College Boys' High School
- Alma mater: Royal Indian Engineering College
- Spouse: Juanita Gutsche
- Scientific career
- Fields: Botany, Forestry
- Institutions: South African College

Johannes Elias Spurgeon Henkel aka John Spurgeon Henkel (1871 in Peddie, Eastern Cape – 5 April 1962 in Pietermaritzburg), was a South African botanist and forester. He was deeply involved in the conservation of forests in southern Africa and the introduction of exotic species such as Eucalyptus to Zululand.

== Life and career ==
Henkel was the son of the soldier, painter and botanist Caesar Carl Hans Henkel (1839-1913) and his wife Auguste Henkel (née Radue). He was the eldest of 12 children. He was educated at Dale College, King William's Town and in 1888 he joined the Cape Forest Department, working as an assistant to the conservator of forests in the Eastern Cape for several years. He was promoted to district forest officer of King William's Town in 1893 and compiled survey maps of Port Alfred (in 1894) and the forested area of Bathurst (in 1895). In 1898 he became district forest officer of Stutterheim.

When the Anglo-Boer War broke out he served in the Stutterheim Mounted Troops as captain and was awarded the Queen's Medal. In 1902 he was selected to study forestry at the Royal Indian Engineering College at Cooper's Hill, where he obtained a Diploma in Forestry.

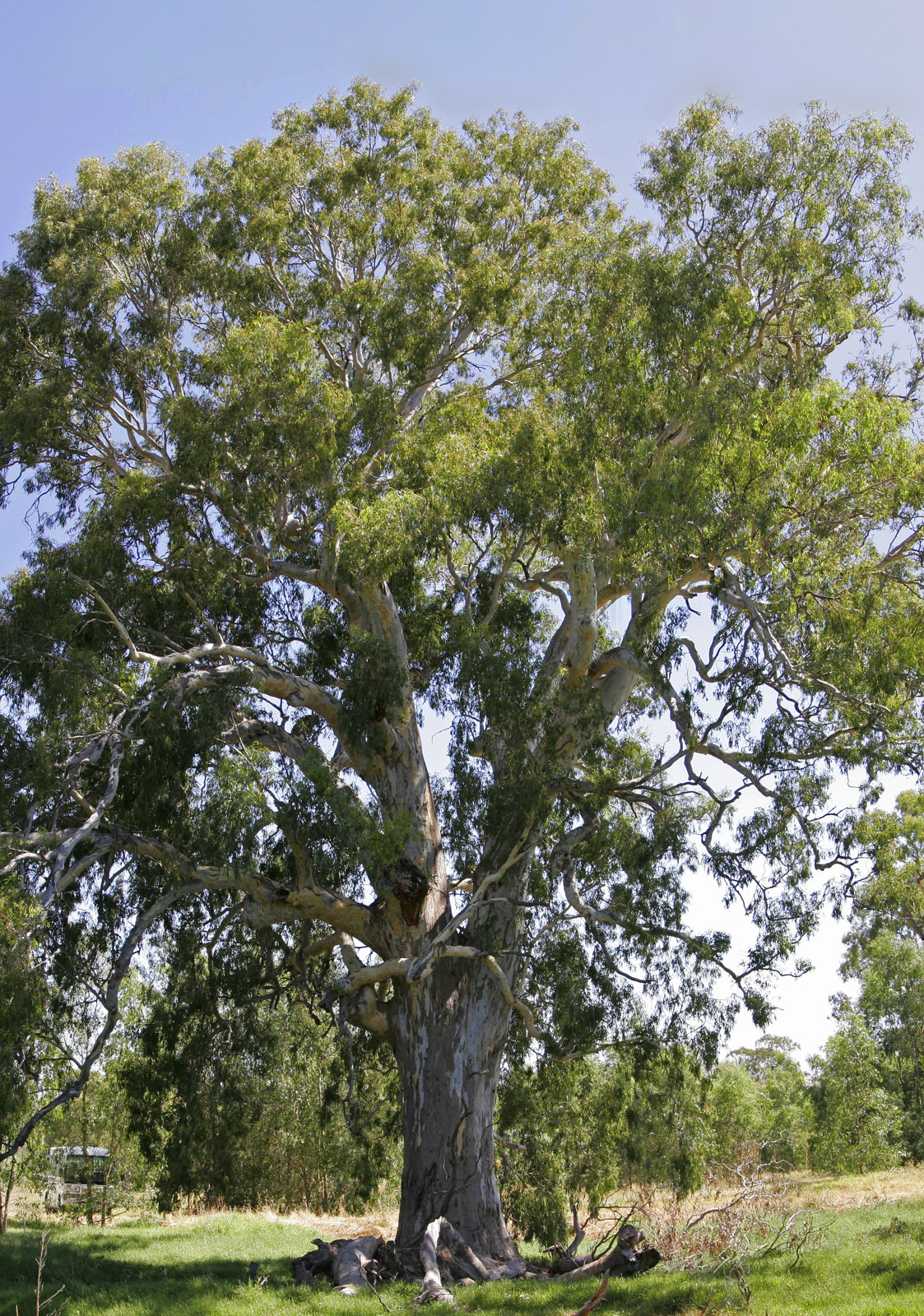
Eucalyptus tree

Henkel returned to South Africa and was appointed Assistant Conservator of Forests in the Eastern Conservancy in 1905. He transferred as Assistant Conservator of Forests to the Western Conservancy (in Cape Town) in 1907 and served as lecturer in forestry at the South African School of Forestry (part of the South African College) until February 1908. In 1909 he moved to Knysna where he succeeded Colin Beddoes McNaughton as Assistant Conservator of Forests and in 1912 was promoted to Conservator of Forests. In 1915 he transferred to Pietermaritzburg as Conservator of Forests for Natal and Zululand. He initiated afforestation in the Zululand coastal region with exotic species including Eucalyptus.

In 1920 he took up an appointment as chief of the newly established Forest Service of Southern Rhodesia (now Zimbabwe). His presentation at the 1919 congress of the South African Association for the Advancement of Science led to a detailed survey of the vegetation of Rhodesia, the first of any African country.

He remained in Rhodesia until his retirement in 1931, after which he settled in Pietermaritzburg and wrote a field guide to the woody plants of Natal. He was a personal friend of John William Bews and assisted him in his investigations of the ecology of the Natal vegetation. He also compiled a map of the Hluhluwe Game Reserve in 1936. From 1944 until his death he worked on a guide to the grasses of southern Africa. The plants he collected are in the Bews Herbarium of the University of Natal.

== Associations and awards ==
- South African Association for the Advancement of Science - Foundation member 1902, council member 1918.
- South African Philosophical Society - member 1907.
- Royal Society of South Africa committee of fellows - member 1908.
- South African Biological Society - foundation member and council member 1916.
- Natal Museum - board of trustees 1917, 1936
- Rhodesia Scientific Association - member 1920.
- Honorary DSc - University of South Africa 1932.

== Private life ==
In February 1896 he married Juanita Gutsche and they had one child.

== Selected publications ==
- The indigenous high forest situated in the divisions of George, Knysna and Humansdorp, Cape Province, Report of the South African Association for the Advancement of Science, 1912, pp. 68–76
- Afforestation in Zululand, Rhodesia Agricultural Journal, 1920, Vol 17, pp. 50–52
- Forest Progress in the Drakensberg - SA Journal of Science, 1916
- Types of Vegetation in Southern Rhodesia - Proceedings of the Rhodesian Science Association, vol.33, 1931
- Woody Plants of Natal & Zululand - Durban, 1934
