= Dale College Boys' High School =

All-boys school in Qonce, South Africa

Coordinates: 32.873967°S 27.406758°E

Location
- 94 Queens Road; Qonce, Buffalo City Metropolitan Municipality, Eastern Cape; South Africa

Information
- School type: All-boys public school
- Motto: Per Ardua ad Astra (Through hardwork, Reach to the Stars)
- Religious affiliation: Christianity
- Established: 1861; 165 years ago
- Sister school: Kingsridge High School for Girls
- School number: +27 (043) 707 6549
- Headmaster: Mr Craig Hatches
- Grades: 8–12
- Gender: Male
- Age: 14 to 18
- Enrollment: 570 boys
- Language: English
- Schedule: 07:30 - 14:15
- Campus: Urban Campus
- Houses: Dioscean; Fuller; Langham; Sutton
- Colours: Red; Black; White
- Nickname: DC; Amadoda
- Rivals: Graeme College; Grey High School; Queen's College; Selborne College
- Accreditation: Eastern Cape Department of Education
- Newspaper: The Black and Red
- Yearbook: The Dalian
- School fees: R54,000 (boarding); R33,000 (tuition)
- Feeder schools: Central Primary School; Dale College Boys Primary School
- Alumni: Old Dalians

Dale College Boys' High School, (commonly referred to as Dale College), is a well-established public English medium high school for boys located in Qonce, a town in the Eastern Cape province of South Africa. With a rich history, it holds the distinction of being one of the oldest schools in the country and is among the few prestigious high schools in the Eastern Cape.

Formerly established as The King William's Town Public School, it was founded in 1861. It was renamed to Dale College in 1877, in honor of Sir Langham Dale, then Superintendent-General of Cape Province.

Captain Cecil D'Arcy of the Frontier Light Horse, who won the Victoria Cross in the Anglo-Zulu War in 1879, was an Old Dalian.

Dale College has long-standing annual derby days for both summer and winter sports with traditional rivals such as Queens College, Grey College, Muir College, St Andrews College, and Selborne College that stretch back to at least the 1960s

== Notable alumni ==
List of matriculants at Dale College:

- John Spurgeon Henkel (Class of 1889) Botanist and forester
- Tertius Myburgh (Class of 1954), Journalist and editor, best known as editor of the Sunday Times between 1975 and 1990.
- Hylton Ackerman (Class of 1965), First class cricket player
- Luke Smith (rugby union) (Class of 1989), South African professional rugby union player

== Actor & model ==
- Makhaya Ntini (Class of 1999), South African professional cricket player
- Monde Zondeki (Class of 2000), South African professional cricket player
- Keegan Daniel (Class of 2003), South African professional rugby player
- Bjorn Basson (Class of 2005), South African professional rugby player
- Siviwe Soyizwapi (Class of 2011) South Africa national rugby sevens team player
- Aphiwe Dyantyi (Class of 2011), South African professional rugby union player
- Rabz Maxwane (Class of 2013), South African professional rugby player
- Courtney Winnaar (Class of 2015), South African professional rugby union player
- Aphelele Fassi (Class of 2016), South African professional rugby union player
