= Minnesota Experimental City =

Proposed planned community in Minnesota, United States

Coordinates: 46°53′37″N 93°40′34″W

The Minnesota Experimental City (MXC) was a proposed planned community to be located in northern Minnesota (near Swatara in Aitkin County). Proposed and studied beginning in the 1960s, it would have been constructed as a public–private partnership. In contrast with many of the model cities of the time, the MXC was to be experimental, trying new things rather than proposing to select from the best of the existing practice. The project was initiated and directed by scientist and University of Minnesota dean Athelstan Spilhaus, and reflected the confidence of that era in the ability of science and technology to solve the world's problems -- "If we could send a human into space, we could do anything" -- and concern that existing cities were failing, blighted by crime, decay and exodus of the well-off to the suburbs.

Supporting MXC were Otto Silha, publisher of the two largest newspapers in the state, the Minneapolis Star and Minneapolis Tribune; a four-star general, the physician of president at the time Lyndon B. Johnson; civil rights leader Muriel S. Snowden; and Buckminster Fuller. MXC received approximately $250,000 in federal government funds thanks to the support of former Minnesota senator and vice-president Hubert Humphrey. The Boeing corporation, Ford Motor Company and Honeywell International Inc. "pledged to invest".

The city was designed for 250,000 people over 60,000 acres (24,000 ha). In the plan, only 1/6 of the area would be paved, the remainder would be open space: parks, wilderness, and farms. Under the influence of Buckminster Fuller who sat on the MXC's advisory board, the plan called for the MXC to be partially enclosed by a geodesic dome. It would contain a branch of the University of Minnesota and 3M Corporation.

Among other proposed features were:

- a pedestrian zone, cars were to be parked on the edge with a people-mover connecting them to the center. An automated highway system would connect the town with the outside world.
- no schools. The city itself would foster lifelong learning, with everyone both a student and teacher.
- waterless toilets.

== Demise ==
The end of MXC was "abrupt". The Minnesota legislature created a Minnesota Experimental City Authority in 1971. It was given the job of finding a site for MXC by 1973. After some months it chose undeveloped land in Aitkin County, a little over 100 miles north of Minneapolis. Unfortunately for the proposed city, local residents became "outspoken critics", claiming the city would bring urban pollution to their area. In August 1973 the Minnesota state legislature eliminated the MXC authority's funding.

In October 2017, roughly 50 years after talk of the city began, a documentary film about MXC, The Experimental City, directed by Chad Freidrichs, premiered at the Chicago International Film Festival.

== See also ==
- Arcology
- Arcosanti
- Brasília
- Epcot
- Utopia
