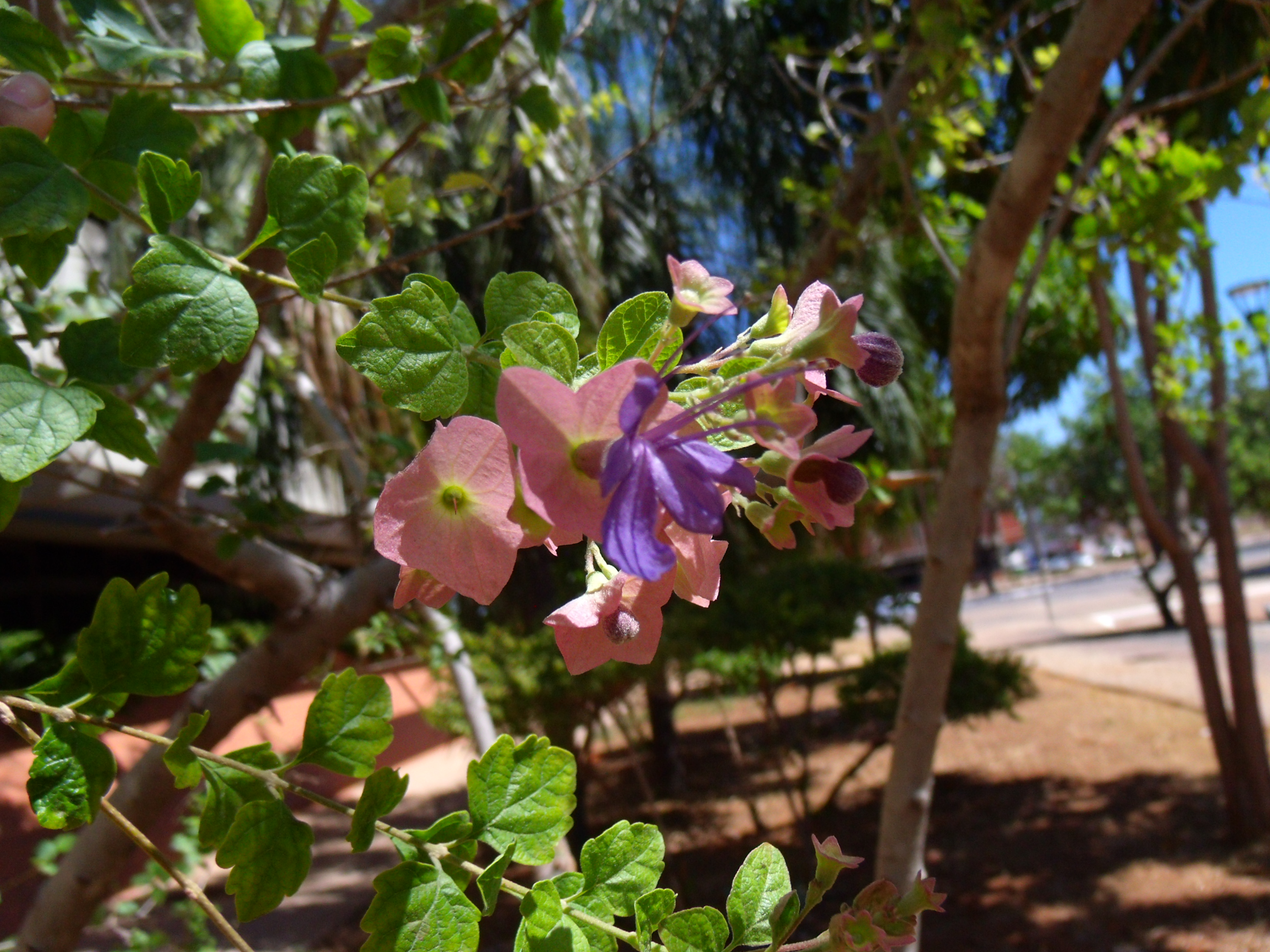

Scientific classification
- Kingdom: Plantae
- Clade: Tracheophytes
- Clade: Angiosperms
- Clade: Eudicots
- Clade: Asterids
- Order: Lamiales
- Family: Lamiaceae
- Subfamily: Ajugoideae
- Genus: Karomia; Dop

= Karomia =

Genus of flowering plants

Karomia is a genus of plants in the family Lamiaceae. The genus was introduced in 1932 by the botanist Paul Louis Amans Dop (1876–1954) in "Bulletin du Muséum national d'histoire naturelle" (Paris) ser. 2. 4: 1052, for the single species Karomia fragrans. It is native to eastern and southern Africa, Madagascar, and Vietnam.

Species

- Karomia fragrans Dop – Vietnam
- Karomia gigas (Faden) Verdc. – Kenya, Tanzania
- Karomia humbertii (Moldenke) R.Fern. – Madagascar
- Karomia macrocalyx (Baker) R.Fern. – Madagascar
- Karomia madagascariensis (Moldenke) R.Fern. – Madagascar
- Karomia microphylla (Moldenke) R.Fern. – Madagascar
- Karomia mira (Moldenke) R.Fern. – Madagascar
- Karomia speciosa (Hutch. & Corbishley) R.Fern. – Mozambique, Eswatini, South Africa
- Karomia tettensis (Klotzsch) R.Fern. – Mozambique, Malawi, Zimbabwe, Zambia
