= Athelstan Spilhaus =

South African-American geophysicist and oceanographer

Athelstan Frederick Spilhaus
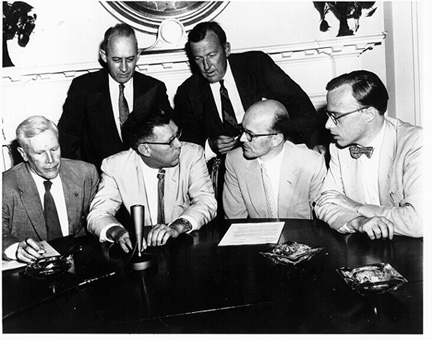
- Spilhaus is standing to the right during the announcement of plans for the building and launching of the world's first human-made satellite, July 29, 1955. (NASA)
- Born: November 25, 1911; Cape Town, South Africa
- Died: March 30, 1998 (aged 86)
- Known for: Bathythermograph; Ocean-centered map projection
- Scientific career
- Fields: Geophysics; Physical Oceanography
- Workplaces: Woods Hole Oceanographic Institution; University of Minnesota; American Newspaper Publishers Association

Athelstan Frederick Spilhaus (November 25, 1911 – March 30, 1998) was a South African-American geophysicist and oceanographer. Among other accomplishments, Spilhaus is credited with proposing the establishment of Sea Grant Colleges at a meeting of the American Fisheries Society in 1963 as a parallel to the successful land-grant university system, which he claimed was "one of the best investments this nation ever made. The same kind of imagination and foresight should be applied to the exploration of the sea."

== Biography ==
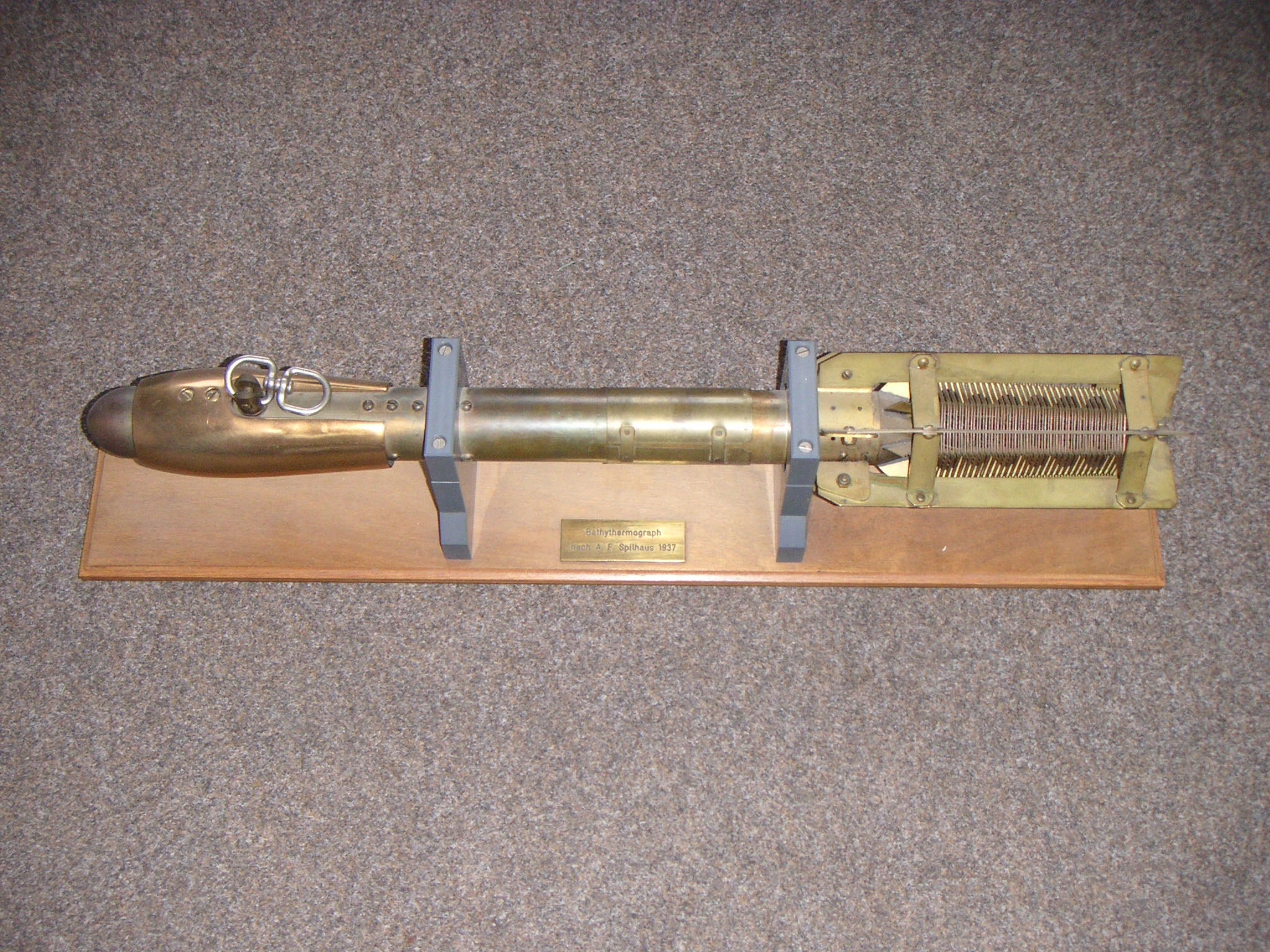
Spilhaus bathythermograph, 1937

Spilhaus was born in 1911 in Cape Town, South Africa, grandson of the Scottish mathematician Thomas Muir. His mother was Nellie Spilhaus, (née Muir), a South African human rights advocate, and his father was Karl Antonio Spilhaus, a South African merchant, born in Lisbon, Portugal and raised in Lübeck, Germany. In 1936, Spilhaus joined the Woods Hole Oceanographic Institution in Massachusetts, where he developed the bathythermograph, which made the measurement of ocean depths and temperatures from a moving vessel possible, a device which proved indispensable to submarine warfare. This invention established his international reputation. He became a US citizen in 1946.

In 1949, he became Dean of the University of Minnesota's Institute of Technology and served in this role until 1966.

Spilhaus was the founder and original planner of the Minnesota Experimental City.

Spilhaus was also chair of the scientific advisory committee of the American Newspaper Publishers Association. He became known by the public for his Our New Age Sunday feature, which appeared in the color comics section of 93 newspapers (1957–1973). The strip therefore was quite influential in its time and John F. Kennedy is cited to have said on a meeting with Spilhaus in 1962: "The only science I ever learned was from your comic strip in the Boston Globe."

He also served on the board of trustees of Science Service, now known as Society for Science & the Public, from 1965 to 1978. He was elected as a member to the American Philosophical Society in 1968.

In 1970, Spilhaus criticized the industrialized mass production of chemicals, stating that they "have upset the little understood ecological balance and have polluted and poisoned the waters." Spilhaus contended that the next industrial revolution must be based on the idea that "there is no such thing as waste, that waste is simply some useful substance that we do not yet have the wit to use." According to Spilhaus, the idea of the "consumer" should be removed from the collective vocabulary, as a person should not be viewed as consuming but merely using "things" that could be repurposed or recycled. He was the prime mover behind The Experimental City project, intended to build a futuristic, pollution-free city. The project never came to fruition despite his 30 years of advocacy for it. It is the subject of a 2017 film documentary, The Experimental City.

In an interview for the American Institute of Physics he stated with reference to a question on his religious views that he was an Episcopalian.

== Spilhaus World Ocean Map Projection ==
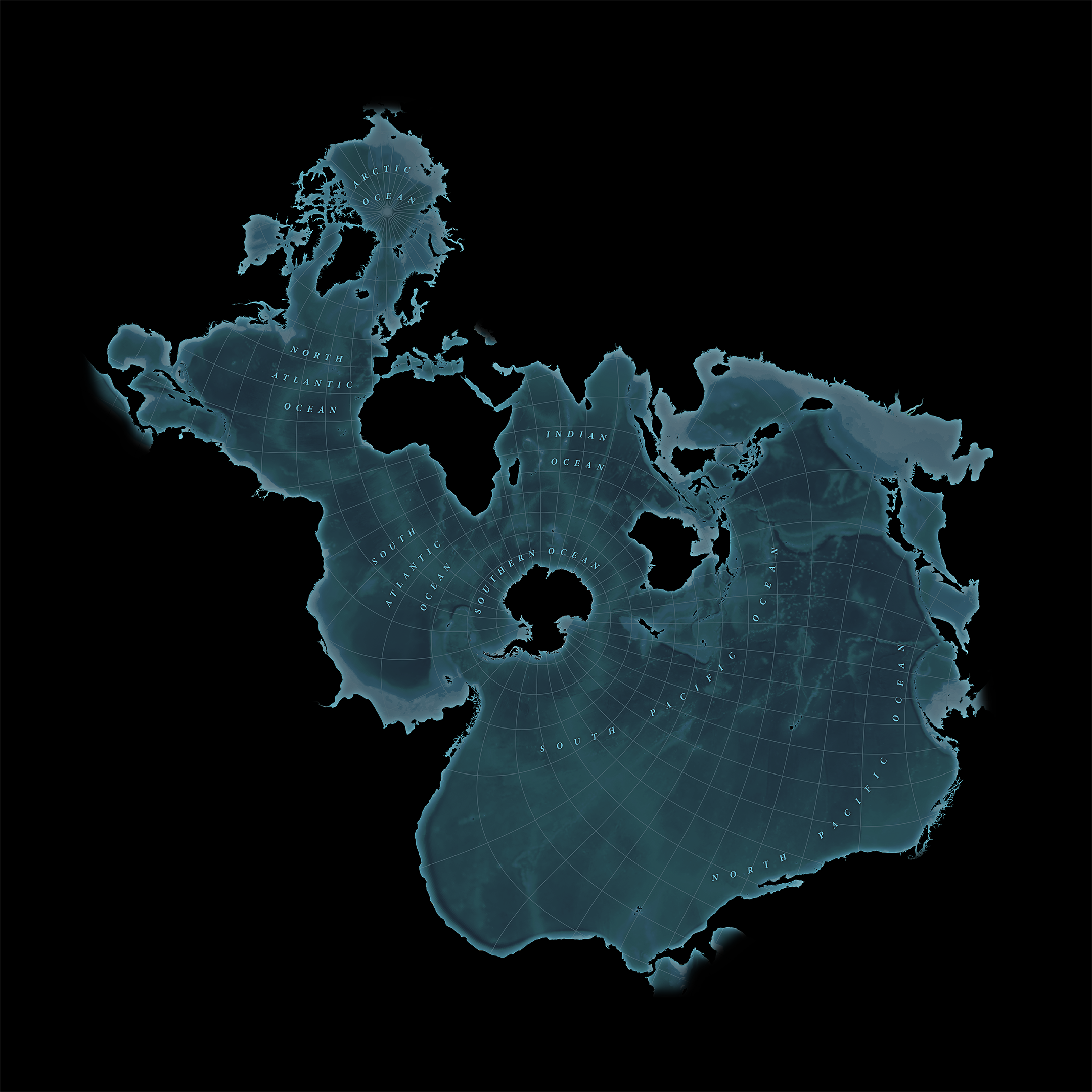
Spilhaus World Ocean Map Projection by NASA's Scientific Visualization Studio

In 1942 Spilhaus tackled the problem of displaying the world's oceans in an unbroken view. He achieved this by carefully selecting antipodal points as the centers for two hemispheric projections. However it wasn't until 1979 that he published maps using continental shorelines as "natural boundaries", including one that has become the typical example of Spilhaus's technique. It uses locations near Hankou in China and Córdoba in Argentina as poles with a cut joining them across the Bering Strait. In 1991, Spilhaus published Atlas of the World illustrated with a large selection of maps having "geophysical boundaries", typically coastlines, in various orientations and for various purposes. He published several other papers and articles on the topic. More recently, the Spilhaus Projection has been used to map multiple seafloor characteristics such as tectonic plate boundaries, hydrothermal vents, and drilling hole sites.
