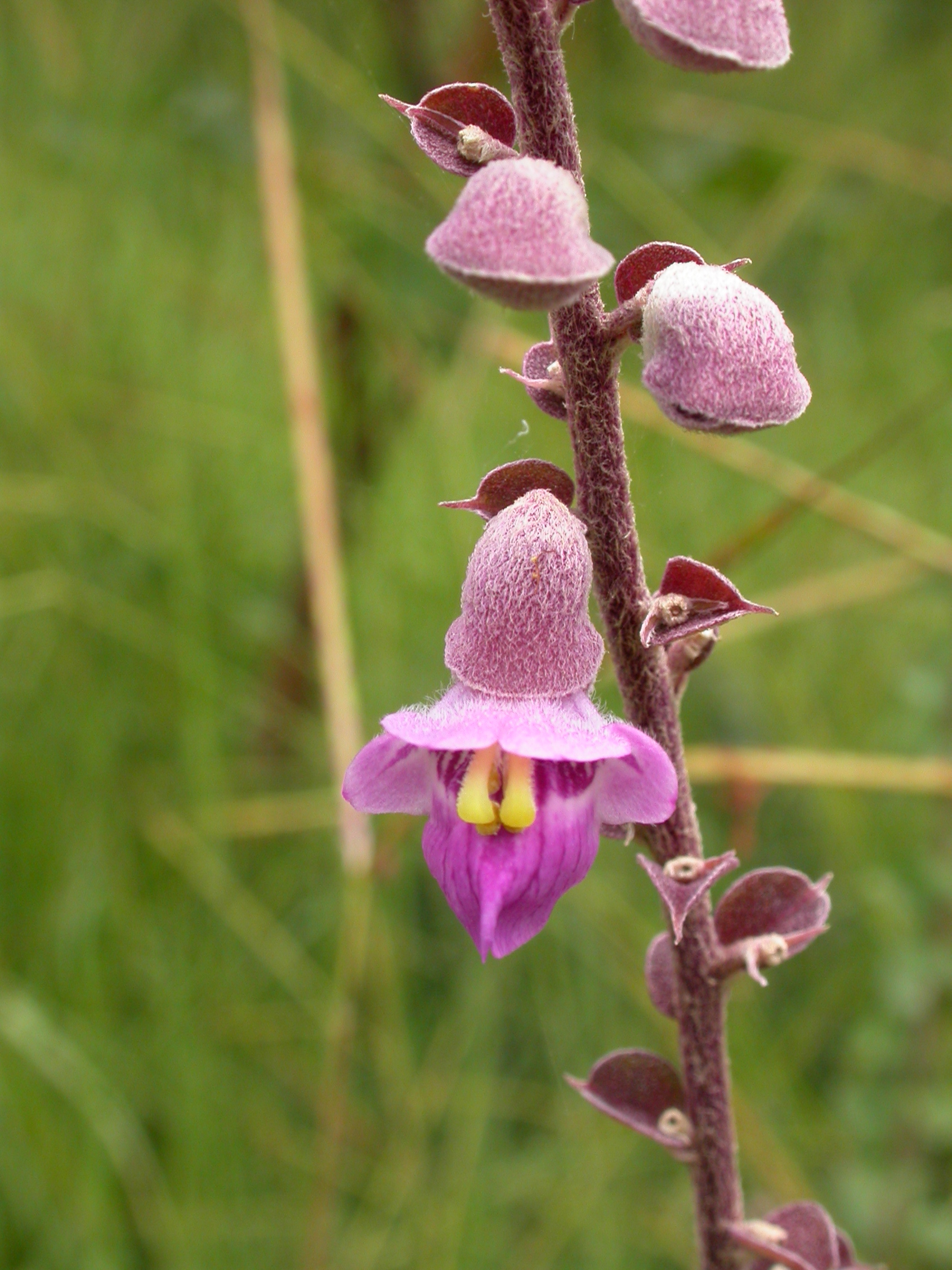
- Tinnea barteri

Scientific classification
- Kingdom: Plantae
- Clade: Tracheophytes
- Clade: Angiosperms
- Clade: Eudicots
- Clade: Asterids
- Order: Lamiales
- Family: Lamiaceae
- Subfamily: Scutellarioideae
- Genus: Tinnea; Kotschy ex Hook.f.

Type species
- Tinnea aethiopica Kotschy & Peyr.

Synonyms
- Tinnethamnus Pritz

= Tinnea =

Genus of flowering plants

Tinnea (sunbells) is a genus of plants in the family Lamiaceae first described in 1867. It is native to sub-Saharan Africa. It was named in honour of the Dutch explorer Alexine Tinne.

Species

- Tinnea aethiopica Kotschy ex Hook.f. – widespread from Mali to Somalia south to Mozambique; naturalized in Trinidad & Tobago
- Tinnea antiscorbutica Welw. – Democratic Republic of the Congo (DRC), Zambia, Angola
- Tinnea apiculata Robyns & Lebrun – eastern Africa from Rwanda to Mozambique
- Tinnea barbata Vollesen – Eswatini, northern South Africa
- Tinnea barteri Gürke – western Africa
- Tinnea benguellensis Gürke – Angola
- Tinnea coerulea Gürke – DRC, Zambia, Angola
- Tinnea eriocalyx Welw. – DRC, Angola, Botswana, Namibia
- Tinnea galpinii Briq. – Eswatini, Mozambique, South Africa
- Tinnea gombea Zhigila – Nigeria
- Tinnea gossweileri Robyns & Lebrun – Angola
- Tinnea gracilis Gürke – Tanzania to Zambia
- Tinnea mirabilis (Bullock) Vollesen – Tanzania
- Tinnea physalis E.A.Bruce – Tanzania
- Tinnea platyphylla Briq. – DRC
- Tinnea rhodesiana S.Moore – South Africa, Namibia, Zimbabwe, Zambia, Angola, Mozambique
- Tinnea somalensis Gürke ex Chiov. – Ethiopia
- Tinnea vesiculosa Gürke – Tanzania, Malawi
- Tinnea vestita Baker – Zimbabwe, Zambia, Angola, Botswana
- Tinnea zambesiaca Baker – Zimbabwe, Zambia, Malawi, Mozambique
