= Wenchengia =

Scientific classification
- Kingdom: Plantae
- Clade: Tracheophytes
- Clade: Angiosperms
- Clade: Eudicots
- Clade: Asterids
- Order: Lamiales
- Family: Lamiaceae
- Subfamily: Scutellarioideae
- Genus: Wenchengia; C.Y.Wu & S.Chow
- Species: W. alternifolia

Binomial name
- Wenchengia alternifolia C.Y.Wu & S.Chow

Genus of flowering plants

Wenchengia is a genus from the family Lamiaceae, first described in 1965. It contains only one known species, Wenchengia alternifolia, endemic to Hainan Province in China.
