= Renschia =

Scientific classification
- Kingdom: Plantae
- Clade: Tracheophytes
- Clade: Angiosperms
- Clade: Eudicots
- Clade: Asterids
- Order: Lamiales
- Family: Lamiaceae
- Subfamily: Scutellarioideae
- Genus: Renschia; Vatke
- Species: R. heterotypica

Binomial name
- Renschia heterotypica (S.Moore) Vatke

Synonyms
- Tinnea heterotypica S.Moore

Genus of flowering plants

Renschia is a genus of flowering plant in the family Lamiaceae, first described as a genus in 1888. It contains only one known species, Renschia heterotypica, endemic to Somaliland in East Africa.
