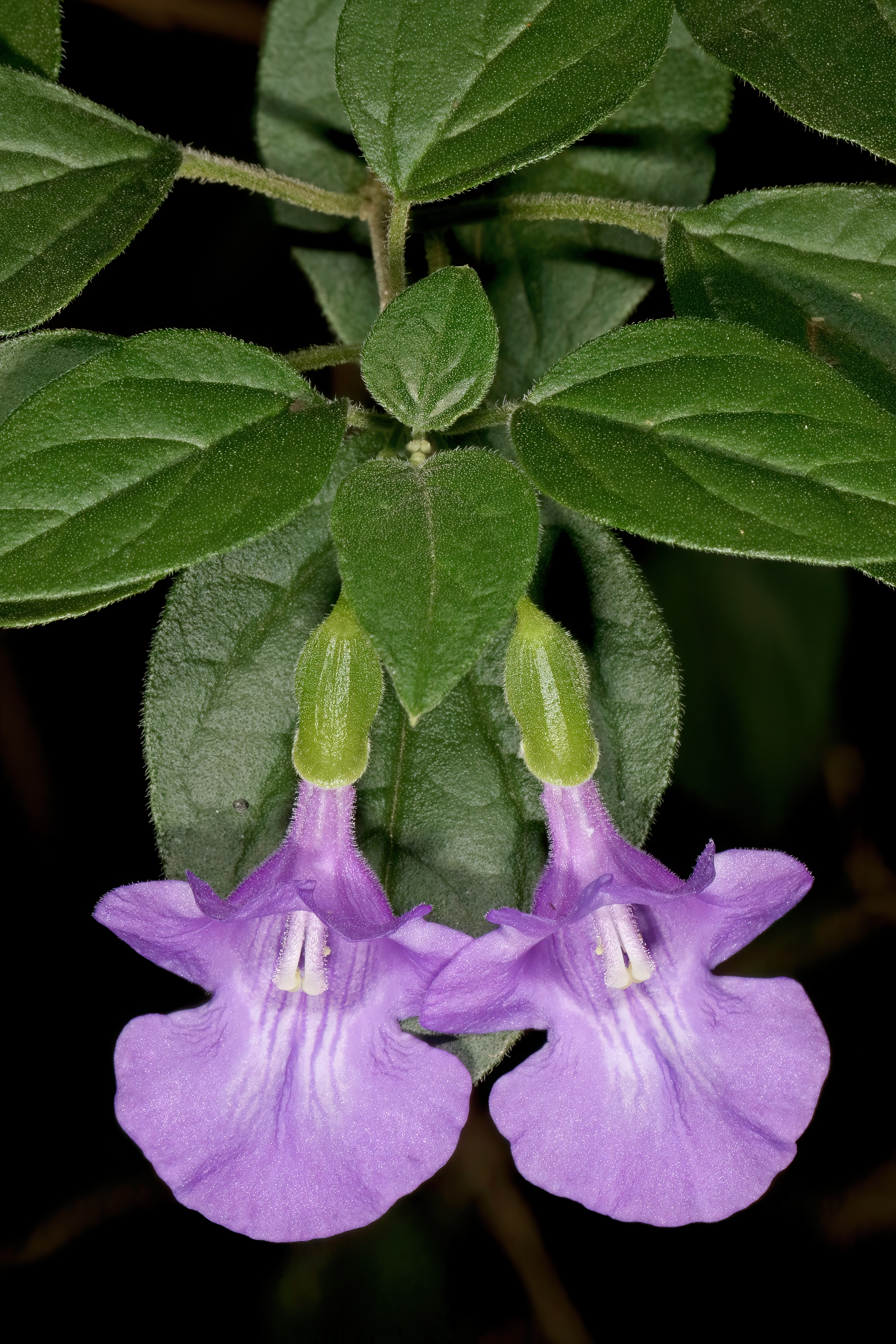

Conservation status
- Least Concern (SANBI Red List)

Scientific classification
- Kingdom: Plantae
- Clade: Embryophytes
- Clade: Tracheophytes
- Clade: Angiosperms
- Clade: Eudicots
- Clade: Asterids
- Order: Lamiales
- Family: Lamiaceae
- Genus: Tinnea
- Species: T. barbata

Binomial name
- Tinnea barbata Vollesen

= Tinnea barbata =

Species of flowering plant

Tinnea barbata, commonly called the blue sunbell, is a species of flowering plant in the family Lamiaceae. It is found in South Africa and Eswatini.

== Description ==
This species is a freely branched shrub reaching about 2.8–4 m (9.2–13.1 ft) tall, with slender branchlets covered in silky hairs.

The leaves are soft and borne on short stalks, with blades ranging from ovate-lanceolate to broadly ovate, about 20–45 mm (0.79–1.77 in) long and 12–25 mm (0.47–0.98 in) wide. They are variably hairy, dotted with small glands on both surfaces, with an acute to slightly blunt tip, an obtuse base, and mostly smooth margins, occasionally with a few weak teeth. The leaf stalks are 7–17 mm (0.28–0.67 in) long.

The flowers are produced at the ends of the branches or on short side shoots, arranged in a few to several well-spaced whorls. Each whorl bears one or two flowers on stalks 8–10 mm (0.31–0.39 in) long, with a small pair of bracteoles partway up. The calyx enlarges as the fruit develops, reaching about 15 mm (0.59 in) long and becoming thin and papery. The corolla is mauve to violet and relatively large, 22–27 mm (0.87–1.06 in) long, with a narrow tube and a broader, showy lower lip.

The fruits are smooth nutlets about 6 mm (0.24 in) long, each surrounded by a conspicuous, broadly elliptical wing measuring roughly 8 mm × 7 mm (0.31 in × 0.28 in).

== Distribution and habitat ==
Tinnea barbata grows in riverine scrub and along forest margins in the mountains to the east of Barberton, Mpumalanga, and in northern Eswatini.

== See also ==
- List of Lamiaceae of South Africa
