= Thomas Muir (mathematician) =

Scottish mathematician (1844–1934)

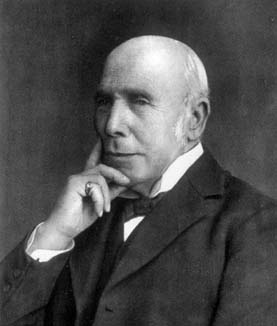
Thomas Muir Mathematician

Sir Thomas Muir CMG FRS FRSE (25 August 1844 – 21 March 1934) was a Scottish mathematician, remembered as an authority on determinants.

== Life ==
He was born in Stonebyres in South Lanarkshire, and brought up in the small town of Biggar. He was educated at Wishaw Public School.

At the University of Glasgow he changed his studies from classics to mathematics after advice from the future Lord Kelvin. After graduating he held positions at the University of St Andrews and the University of Glasgow. From 1874 to 1892 he taught at Glasgow High School. In 1882 he published Treatise on the theory of determinants; then in 1890 he published a History of determinants. In his 1882 work, Muir rediscovered an important lemma that was first proved by Cayley 35 years earlier: In Glasgow he lived at Beechcroft in the Bothwell district.

In 1874 he was elected a Fellow of the Royal Society of Edinburgh, His proposers were William Thomson, Lord Kelvin, Hugh Blackburn, Philip Kelland and Peter Guthrie Tait. He won the Society's Keith Prize for 1881-1883 and a second time in 1895–1897. He served as the Society's Vice President 1888 to 1891. He won the Gunning Victoria Jubilee Prize for 1912 to 1916.

From 1892 to 1915 he was in South Africa as Superintendent General of Education, and also working at the University of the Cape. He was elected a Fellow of the Royal Society of Edinburgh and in 1900 a Fellow of the Royal Society. He was installed Companion of the Order of St Michael and St George (CMG) in 1901 and knighted by King George V in the 1915 Birthday Honours.

Shortly after his arrival at the Cape, the Uitenhage Public School in the Eastern Cape, originally established in 1822 by Scots educator James Rose Innes, was renamed the Muir Academy, later becoming Muir College, which is nowadays believed to be the oldest secondary school in South Africa. The progressive development of this and other schools during Muir's tenure as Superintendent-General of Education was strongly influenced by Muir's belief in the importance of subjects requiring manual dexterity (woodwork and needlework) and the teaching of mathematics, science and nature study. He also improved the training of teachers - when he arrived in the Cape there was only one training college, but when he retired 23 years later there were twelve.

From 1906 onwards he published a five-volume expansion of his history of determinants, the final part (1929) taking the theory to 1920. A further book followed in 1930.

He died on 21 March 1934 in Rondebosch in South Africa.

His name now attaches to a duality theorem on relations between minors. In more abstract language, it is a general result on the equations defining Grassmannians as algebraic varieties.

== Family ==
In 1876 he married Margaret Bell. The distinguished geophysicist Athelstan Spilhaus was their grandson.

== Publications by Sir Thomas Muir ==
- The Theory of the Determinant in the Historical Order of Development. 4 vols. New York: Dover Publications 1960
- A Treatise on the Theory of Determinants. Revised and Enlarged by William H. Metzler. New York: Dover Publications 1960
- "A Second Budget of Exercises on Determinants", American Mathematical Monthly, Vol. 31, No. 6. (June, 1924), pp. 264–274
- "Note on the Transformation of a Determinant into any Other Equivalent Determinant", The Analyst, Vol. 10, No. 1. (Jan 1883), pp. 8–9
- A History of Determinants (1929)
