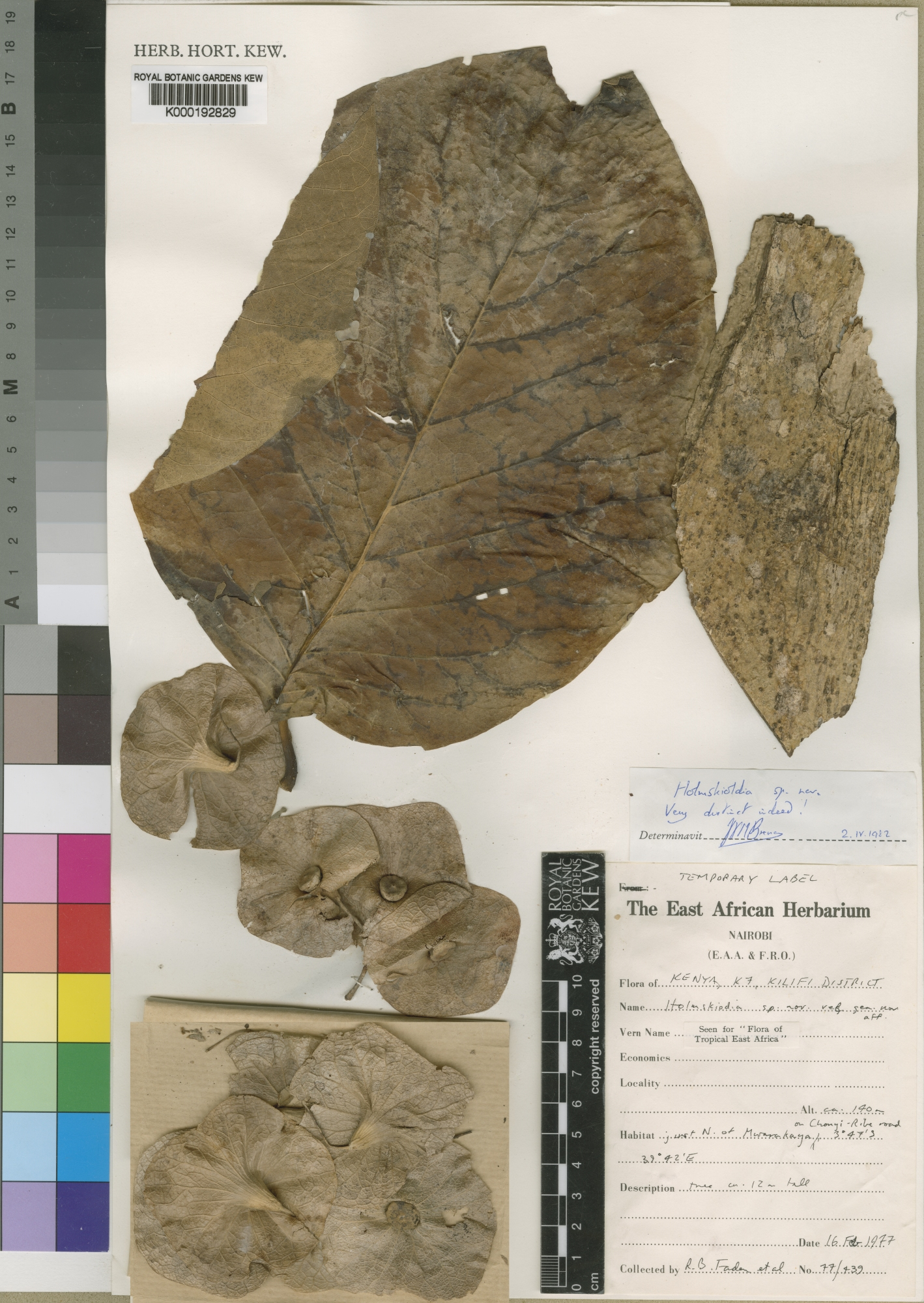

Conservation status
- Critically Endangered (IUCN 3.1)

Scientific classification
- Kingdom: Plantae
- Clade: Tracheophytes
- Clade: Angiosperms
- Clade: Eudicots
- Clade: Asterids
- Order: Lamiales
- Family: Lamiaceae
- Genus: Karomia
- Species: K. gigas

Binomial name
- Karomia gigas (Faden) Verdc.

Synonyms
- Holmskioldia gigas Faden

= Karomia gigas =

Species of flowering plant

Karomia gigas is a species of plant in the family Lamiaceae. It is now found only in Tanzania, where only small populations survive. It was previously also found in Kenya but is now considered extinct there.

In 2016 Botanic Gardens Conservation International found six Karomia gigas trees in one location in Tanzania. They employed local Tanzanians to guard the trees and report if there were any seeds so that they could be cultivated in a Tanzanian botanical garden.
