= Amy Corbishley =

South African botanist (1889–1977)

Amy Gertrude Corbishley (1889–1977) was a South African botanist who worked as the first South African Botanist Liaison Officer at Kew Gardens.

Born in Durban in 1889, she studied under John Bews at the University of Natal in 1912. She also studied at the University of the Cape of Good Hope and Trinity College, Cambridge.

When Dr Illtyd Buller Pole-Evans was asked to appoint an 'Assistant for South Africa' (later called South African Botanist Liaison Officer) at Kew Gardens in 1919, Corbishley was given the post. Her salary was paid by the South African Government. The post was then taken up by Inez Verdoorn in 1925.

She described ten species of South African plants, specialising in spermatophytes, before returning to Durban in 1921.

She died in 1977.
