= John Bews =

Scottish born South African botanist (1884–1938)

John William Bews
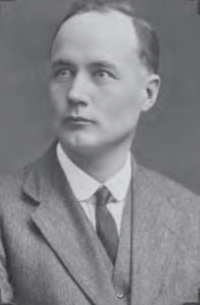
- Born: 16 December 1884; Kirkwall, Orkney Islands, Scotland
- Died: 10 November 1938 (aged 53); Pietermaritzburg, South Africa
- Occupation: botanist
- Notable work: Plant Forms and Their Evolution in South Africa, The Grasses and Grasslands of South Africa

John William Bews (16 December 1884 — 10 November 1938) was a Scottish born South African botanist.

== Early life ==
Bews was born in Kirkwall on the Orkney Islands of Scotland. His parents were farmers. He did his schooling in Kirkwall and later studied mathematics, natural philosophy, chemistry, geology, Latin, English and logic at Edinburgh University. He took a second degree in botany, chemistry and geology in 1907.

== Botanical work ==
In 1909 Bews was appointed professor of botany and geology at the newly established Natal University College in Pietermaritzburg, South Africa. Originally intending to study plant physiology, the challenges of a new and under-resourced laboratory and the new (to him) vegetation of the Natal Midlands meant that he changed the direction of his study to field work.

The standard author abbreviation Bews is used to indicate this person as the author when citing a botanical name.

== Philosophy ==
Bews was a protege of General Jan Smuts and was influenced by his ideas on holism. "Botany, patriotism and the politics of national unity were bound up... Bews made this links explicit, recommending that ecologists use the language of sociology to describe relationships in the plant world".

== Works ==
- Plant Forms and Their Evolution in South Africa. Longman, Green. 1925. ISBN 9780598901552.
- The Grasses and Grasslands of South Africa. P. David & Sons. 1918.
- Researches on the Vegetation of Natal. Government Printer. 1923.
- The Plant Ecology of the Drakensberg Range. 1917.

== Commemoration ==
The Bews Herbarium on the Pietermaritzburg campus of the University of Natal is named in his honour.
