= University of the Cape of Good Hope =

- Universiteit van Kaap die Goeie Hoop
- Type: Public examining university
- Active: 1873–1918
- Location: Cape Town, Cape Colony

The University of the Cape of Good Hope (Afrikaans: Universiteit van Kaap die Goeie Hoop) was the first university in South Africa, established in the Cape Colony in 1873. Modelled on the University of London, it was a purely examining body: it set syllabuses and examinations and conferred degrees but did no teaching of its own. For more than four decades it was the central degree-awarding authority for the Cape and the other South African colonies, examining the students of the various colonial "university colleges" and serving as the institution from which most of South Africa's universities are descended.

Created by Act 16 of 1873 of the Cape Parliament under the Molteno government, the university received a royal charter from Queen Victoria in 1877 that gave its degrees a standing equal to those of British universities. Following the union of the South African colonies, it was reconstituted by the University of South Africa Act, 1916 as the federal University of South Africa (Unisa), which came into operation in 1918 and moved its seat to Pretoria; the same legislation simultaneously established the University of Cape Town and Stellenbosch University as autonomous teaching universities.

== Background: the Board of Public Examiners ==
Formal higher education at the Cape began with the Board of Public Examiners, established in 1858 to conduct examinations modelled on those of the University of London and to award certificates to successful candidates, although it could not confer degrees. Langham Dale, the Cape Colony's Superintendent-General of Education, was a member and later president of the board between 1859 and 1872. As the Cape entered a period of economic growth and modernisation in the 1860s and 1870s, pressure grew for a body able to grant recognised university degrees.

== Foundation (1873) ==
The university was created by Act 16 of 1873, passed by the Cape Parliament under the premiership of John Charles Molteno. Like the University of London on which it was modelled, it was an examining and degree-awarding institution that provided no instruction itself. Its first council met on 1 September 1873 and elected Langham Dale as the university's first vice-chancellor. The office of chancellor was to remain vacant until the membership of convocation reached one hundred; that threshold was passed in February 1876, when William Porter, a former Attorney-General of the Cape Colony, was elected the first chancellor.

== Royal charter and early years ==
On 8 August 1877, at the instance of the Earl of Carnarvon, the Colonial Secretary, Queen Victoria granted the university a royal charter, declaring that its degrees were not inferior to those conferred by universities in Great Britain. At its first degree ceremony the university conferred six Bachelor of Arts degrees and one Master of Arts on candidates from the South African College and the Diocesan College. Although its examinations were dominated by Latin and Greek in the Victorian manner, the university came to include the Xhosa and Sotho languages among those it examined.

== Role as an examining university ==
The university did not teach; instead it set the curricula and examinations for—and conferred degrees upon—the students of the colonial "university colleges", which carried out the instruction. These included the South African College and the Diocesan College in Cape Town, Victoria College in Stellenbosch, and, in time, colleges at Grahamstown, Bloemfontein, Pietermaritzburg, Johannesburg and Pretoria. Because nearly all of these institutions later became independent universities, the University of the Cape of Good Hope is regarded as the common ancestor, or "incubator", of the modern South African university system.

== Reconstitution as the University of South Africa (1916–1918) ==
After the Union of South Africa was formed in 1910, the colonial model of a single examining university was reorganised. Three Acts passed in 1916 and brought into force on 2 April 1918 restructured higher education: the University of South Africa Act (Act 12 of 1916) reconstituted the University of the Cape of Good Hope as the federal University of South Africa, whose seat moved to Pretoria, while the University of Cape Town Act (Act 14 of 1916) and the Stellenbosch University Act (Act 13 of 1916) turned the South African College and Victoria College into autonomous teaching universities. As the University of South Africa the institution continued in its examining role as a federal university for the remaining colleges—among them the Rhodes, Grey, Natal, Transvaal and Potchefstroom university colleges—until they too became independent, and from 1946 it was reorganised as a distance education university.

== Chancellors ==
The chancellors of the University of the Cape of Good Hope were:

- Office vacant (1873–1876)
- William Porter (1876–1880)
- Sir Henry Bartle Frere (1880–1884)
- Henry Herbert, 4th Earl of Carnarvon (1884–1890)
- Sir Langham Dale (1890–1898)
- Justice Charles Thomas Smith (1898–1901)
- Prince George, Duke of Cornwall and York (1901–1912)
- Prince Arthur, Duke of Connaught and Strathearn (1912–1918)

Langham Dale had earlier served as the university's first vice-chancellor.

== See also ==
- University of South Africa
- University of London
- List of universities in South Africa
