= Prince Frederick of Württemberg =

German prince (1808–1870)

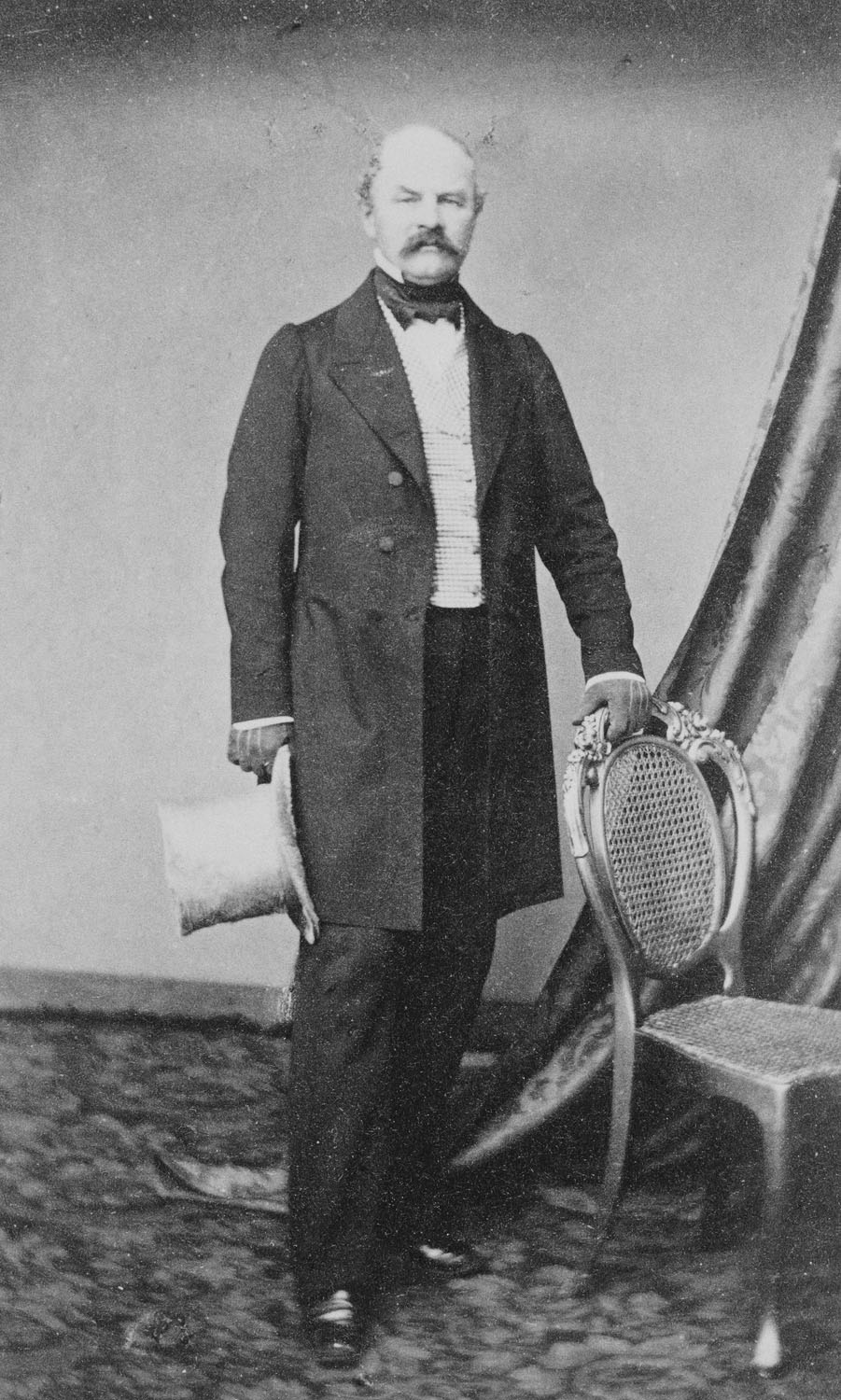
- Prince Frederick in 1862
- Born: 21 February 1808; Schloss Comburg (now part of Schwäbisch Hall), Kingdom of Württemberg
- Died: 9 May 1870 (aged 62); Stuttgart, Kingdom of Württemberg
- Burial: Schlosskirche, Ludwigsburg, Germany
- Spouse: Princess Catherine of Württemberg (m. 1845)
- Issue: William II of Württemberg
Names
- Frederick Charles Augustus; German: Friedrich Karl August
- House: Württemburg
- Father: Prince Paul of Württemberg
- Mother: Princess Charlotte of Saxe-Hildburghausen

Prince Frederick of Württemberg (German: Friedrich Karl August Prinz von Württemberg) (21 February 1808 – 9 May 1870) was a German prince from House of Württemberg, a general in the Army of Württemberg and the father of William II of Württemberg.

== Family ==
Frederick was born 21 February 1808 at Schloss Comburg (now part of Schwäbisch Hall), Kingdom of Württemberg, the second child and eldest son of Prince Paul of Württemberg and his wife Princess Charlotte of Saxe-Hildburghausen. Through his father, Frederick was a grandson of Frederick I of Württemberg and through his mother, a grandson of Frederick, Duke of Saxe-Altenburg. He was a younger brother of Grand Duchess Elena Pavlovna of Russia and an elder brother of Pauline, Duchess of Nassau and Prince August of Württemberg.

== Military career ==
Frederick began his military career in the Army of Württemberg (German: Württembergische Armee) where by the age of 15, he had reached the rank of Rittmeister 2nd class. In 1832, he was a Colonel of the Infantry and by 1841, Frederick had attained the rank of Lieutenant General of the Cavalry. In 1865, Frederick was promoted by Charles I of Württemberg to General Commander of the Cavalry and the Württemberg Federal Army Corps (German: Württembergischen Bundesarmeekorps). In the Austro-Prussian War against Prussia, Frederick held no field command, but instead served as a liaison officer at the headquarters of the Austrian Feldzeugmeister. Despite his serious eye problems, Frederick was offended when he was not offered the command of the Eighth Army Corps during the war.

== Political career ==
Because of his position as a Prince of Württemberg, Frederick held a served as a member of the Württembergian Chamber of Lords (German: Württembergischen Kammer der Standesherren) at which he regularly attended legislative sessions. In 1865, Charles appointed Frederick as a privy councillor in the Geheimer Rat. During this time, Frederick resided mainly at Ludwigsburg Palace near Stuttgart and at the hunting lodge Schloss Katharinenhof in Oppenweiler.

== Marriage and issue ==
Frederick married his first cousin Princess Catherine of Württemberg, daughter of William I of Württemberg and his wife Pauline Therese of Württemberg, on 20 November 1845 in Stuttgart, Kingdom of Württemberg. Frederick and Catherine had one son:

- William II of Württemberg (25 February 1848 – 2 October 1921)

== Later life and death ==
Frederick died on 9 May 1870 in Stuttgart, Kingdom of Württemberg of an ulceration, which was most likely a later consequence of a facial injury he sustained in a hunting accident. Sophie, Queen of the Netherlands wrote of her cousin Frederick to Lady Malet upon learning of his death. According to Sophie, Frederick died after having suffered "cancer in the face" for eight years. Frederick was interred in the family crypt in the Schlosskirche at Ludwigsburg Palace.

== Honours ==
- Württemberg:
  - Grand Cross of the Württemberg Crown, 1822
  - Grand Cross of the Friedrich Order
- Kingdom of Bavaria: Knight of St. Hubert, 1830
- Kingdom of Saxony: Knight of the Rue Crown, 1834
- (Saxe-Coburg and Gotha) (Duchy of Saxe-Altenburg) (Saxe-Meiningen) Ernestine duchies: Grand Cross of the Saxe-Ernestine House Order, February 1837
- Baden:
  - Knight of the House Order of Fidelity, 1845
  - Grand Cross of the Zähringer Lion, 1845
- Oldenburg: Grand Cross of the Order of Duke Peter Friedrich Ludwig, with Golden Crown, 17 October 1853
- Kingdom of Hanover: Knight of St. George, 1855
- Nassau: Knight of the Gold Lion of Nassau, November 1858

== Ancestry ==
Ancestors of Prince Frederick of Württemberg

8. Frederick II Eugene, Duke of Württemberg
4. Frederick I of Württemberg
9. Princess Friederike of Brandenburg-Schwedt
2. Prince Paul of Württemberg
10. Charles William Ferdinand, Duke of Brunswick
5. Duchess Augusta of Brunswick-Wolfenbüttel
11. Princess Augusta of Great Britain
1. Prince Frederick of Württemberg
12. Ernest Frederick III, Duke of Saxe-Hildburghausen
6. Frederick, Duke of Saxe-Altenburg
13. Princess Ernestine of Saxe-Weimar-Eisenach
3. Princess Charlotte of Saxe-Hildburghausen
14. Charles II, Grand Duke of Mecklenburg-Strelitz
7. Duchess Charlotte Georgine of Mecklenburg-Strelitz
15. Princess Friederike of Hesse-Darmstadt

Prince Frederick of Württemberg House of Württemberg Born: 21 February 1808 Died: 9 May 1870
German royalty
Preceded by Charles, Crown Prince of Württemberg later became Charles I	Heir to the Throne of Württemberg as heir presumptive 25 June 1864 – 9 May 1870	Succeeded by Prince William later became William II
