= William II of Württemberg =

Last King of Württemberg from 1891 to 1918

William II
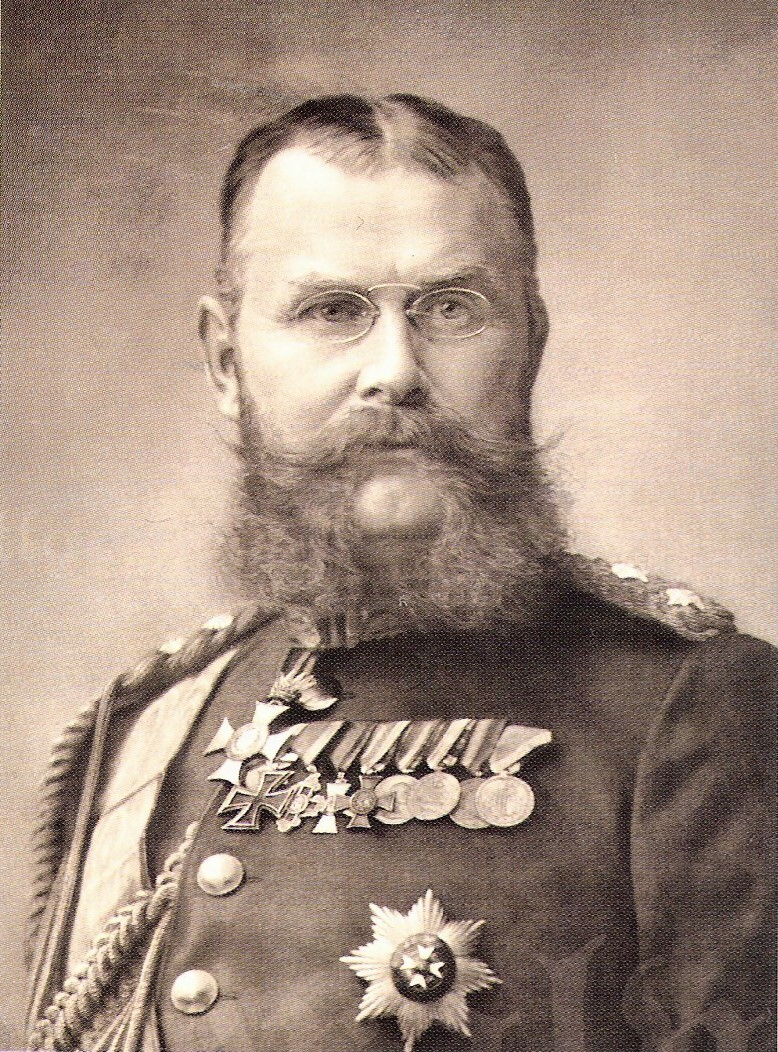
- King William in 1892

King of Württemberg
- Reign: 6 October 1891 – 30 November 1918
- Predecessor: Charles I
- Successor: Monarchy abolished
- Born: 25 February 1848; Stuttgart, Kingdom of Württemberg
- Died: 2 October 1921 (aged 73); Bebenhausen, Württemberg, Weimar Republic
- Spouse: Marie of Waldeck and Pyrmont (m. 1877; died 1882) Charlotte of Schaumburg-Lippe (m. 1886)
- Issue: Pauline, Princess of Wied; Prince Ulrich
Names
- German: Wilhelm Karl Paul Heinrich Friedrich
- House: Württemberg
- Father: Prince Frederick of Württemberg
- Mother: Princess Catherine of Württemberg
- Religion: Lutheran

1911 Three Mark coin from Württemberg, featuring the likeness of Wilhelm II

William II (German: Wilhelm Karl Paul Heinrich Friedrich; 25 February 1848 – 2 October 1921) was the last King of Württemberg. He ruled from 6 October 1891 until the dissolution of the kingdom on 30 November 1918. He was the last German ruler to abdicate in the wake of the November Revolution of 1918.

== Early years ==
William was born the son of Prince Frederick of Württemberg (1808–1870) by his wife Princess Catherine Frederica of Württemberg (1821–1898), herself the daughter of King William I of Württemberg (1781–1864). His parents were first cousins, being the children of two brothers, and William was their only child.

William's growing years coincided with a progressive diminution of Württemberg's sovereignty and international presence, concomitant with the process of German unification. In 1870, Württemberg took the side of Prussia in the Franco-German War. In 1871, Württemberg became a state of the German Empire, a significant limitation on its sovereignty.

== King of Württemberg ==
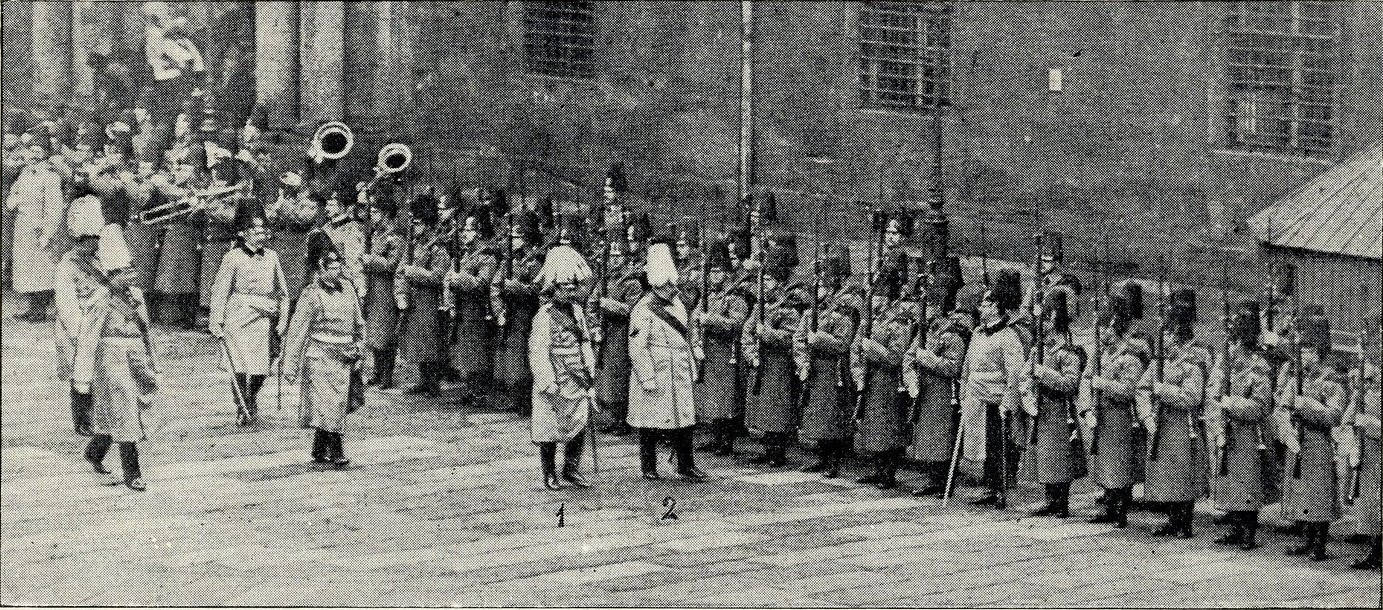
King William II together with King of Saxony Frederick Augustus III, 1906

William's father died in 1870, but his mother lived to see him seated on the throne of Württemberg. In 1891, William succeeded his childless maternal uncle, King Charles I (1823–1891) and became King of Württemberg. This was not, as it may seem, a departure from the Salic law which governed succession in the German states; his claim to the throne came because he was the nearest agnatic heir of his uncle, as the senior male-line descendant of Frederick I of Württemberg through his younger son Prince Paul.

King William became a Generalfeldmarschall during World War I. In 1918, he was deposed from the throne along with the other German rulers. King William finally abdicated on 30 November 1918, ending over 800 years of the House of Württemberg rule. He died in 1921 at Bebenhausen.

== Personality and interests ==
Considered to be a popular monarch, William had the habit of walking his two dogs in public parks in Stuttgart without being attended by bodyguards or the like. During these excursions, he would often be greeted by his subjects with a simple Herr König ("Mister King").

Despite living in a landlocked kingdom, William II was a yachting enthusiast. The king was instrumental in the establishment of the Württembergischer Yacht Club (formerly "Königlich Württembergischer Yacht-Club" or Royal Yacht Club of Württemberg) in 1911 on Lake Constance.

== Marriages and children ==
On 15 February 1877 at Arolsen he married Princess Marie of Waldeck and Pyrmont (1857–1882). They had three children:

- Princess Pauline of Württemberg (19 December 1877 – 7 May 1965); married in 1898 William Frederick, Prince of Wied (1872–1945), and had issue.
- Prince Ulrich of Württemberg (28 July 1880 – 28 December 1880), died in infancy
- A stillborn daughter (24 April 1882)

Marie died on 30 April 1882 in Stuttgart, from complications resulting from the birth of their third child. William, already depressed by the death of his only son, is said never to have recovered from this blow.

Nevertheless, he was King and it was his duty to secure the succession. On 8 April 1886, at Bückeburg, he married Princess Charlotte of Schaumburg-Lippe (1864–1946). They had no children.

== Succession ==
On William II's death in 1921 without male issue, the royal branch of the House of Württemberg became extinct, and the headship of the house devolved to Albrecht, Duke of Württemberg, head of the Catholic cadet branch of the dynasty, based at Altshausen. Albrecht was a descendant of Alexander of Württemberg, the 7th son of Frederick II Eugene, Duke of Württemberg (1732–1797).

== Honours ==
German awards

- Württemberg:
  - Grand Cross of the Württemberg Crown, 1862
  - Grand Cross of the Friedrich Order
  - Knight of the Military Merit Order, 18 August 1866; Commander, 7 November 1886
- Anhalt: Grand Cross of the Order of Albert the Bear, 1889
- Baden: Knight of the House Order of Fidelity, 1876
- Bavaria:
  - Knight of St. Hubert, 1877
  - Grand Cross of the Military Order of Max Joseph
- Brunswick: Grand Cross of the Order of Henry the Lion, 1899
- (Saxe-Coburg and Gotha) (Duchy of Saxe-Altenburg) (Saxe-Meiningen) Ernestine duchies: Grand Cross of the Saxe-Ernestine House Order, 1874
- Hesse and by Rhine: Grand Cross of the Ludwig Order, 24 March 1893
- (Principality of Schaumburg-Lippe) Lippe:
  - Cross of Honour of the House Order of Lippe, 1st Class
  - Military Merit Medal (Schaumburg-Lippe)
- Mecklenburg: Grand Cross of the Wendish Crown, with Crown in Ore
- (Duchy of Nassau) Nassau Ducal Family: Knight of the Gold Lion of Nassau
- Oldenburg: Grand Cross of the Order of Duke Peter Friedrich Ludwig, with Golden Crown, 13 February 1877
- Saxe-Weimar-Eisenach: Grand Cross of the White Falcon, 1892
- Saxony:
  - Knight of the Rue Crown, 1886
  - Grand Cross of the Military Order of St. Henry
- Prussia:
  - Knight of the Black Eagle, 1 June 1870; with Collar, 1872
  - Grand Commander's Cross of the Royal House Order of Hohenzollern, 11 June 1879
  - Knight of Honour of the Johanniter Order, 28 July 1885
  - Pour le Mérite (military)
  - Iron Cross, 2nd Class
- (Hohenzollern-Sigmaringen) Hohenzollern: Cross of Honour of the Princely House Order of Hohenzollern, 1st Class

Foreign awards

- (Austrian Empire) (Kingdom of Hungary) Austria-Hungary:
  - Grand Cross of the Royal Hungarian Order of St. Stephen, 1886
  - Military Merit Cross, 1st Class
- Kingdom of Italy: Knight of the Annunciation, 25 September 1893
- Empire of Japan: Grand Cordon of the Order of the Chrysanthemum, 23 May 1896
- Netherlands: Grand Cross of the Netherlands Lion
- Russian Empire:
  - Knight of St. Andrew
  - Knight of St. Alexander Nevsky
  - Knight of the White Eagle
  - Knight of St. Anna, 1st Class
  - Knight of St. Stanislaus, 1st Class
  - Knight of St. George, 4th Class
- Spain: Knight of the Golden Fleece, 3 May 1892
- Sweden: Knight of the Seraphim, 9 July 1913
- United Kingdom: Stranger Knight Companion of the Garter, 23 February 1904 (expelled in 1915)

=== Arms ===
Royal Monogram of King Wilhelm II of Württemberg	Coat of Arms of the Kingdom of Württemberg, 1817	Royal Monogram of King Wilhelm II of Württemberg, Variant	Coat of Arms of King Wilhelm II as a Knight of the Golden Fleece

== Ancestry ==
Ancestors of William II of Württemberg

8. Frederick I of Württemberg
4. Prince Paul of Württemberg
9. Duchess Augusta of Brunswick-Wolfenbüttel
2. Prince Frederick of Württemberg
10. Frederick, Duke of Saxe-Altenburg
5. Princess Charlotte of Saxe-Hildburghausen
11. Duchess Charlotte Georgine of Mecklenburg-Strelitz
1. William II of Württemberg
12. Frederick I of Württemberg (= 8)
6. William I of Württemberg
13. Duchess Augusta of Brunswick-Wolfenbüttel (= 9)
3. Princess Catherine of Württemberg
14. Duke Louis of Württemberg
7. Duchess Pauline Therese of Württemberg
15. Princess Henriette of Nassau-Weilburg

== See also ==
- Rulers of Württemberg

William II of Württemberg House of Württemberg Born: 25 February 1848 Died: 2 October 1921
Regnal titles
Preceded by Charles I	King of Württemberg; 1891–1918	Monarchy abolished German Revolution
Titles in pretence
Loss of title Republic declared	— TITULAR — King of Württemberg; 1918–1921; Reason for succession failure: Kingdom abolished in 1918	Succeeded by Duke Albrecht
