= Prince August of Württemberg =

German prince and general (1813–1885)

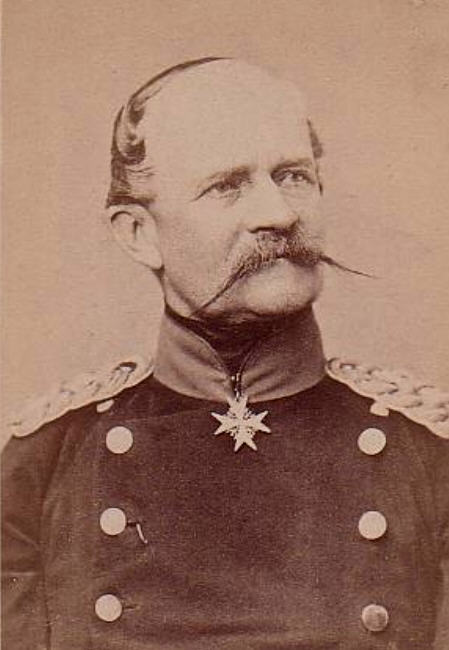
- Born: 24 January 1813; Stuttgart, Kingdom of Württemberg
- Died: 12 January 1885 (aged 71); Ban de Teuffer, Zehdenick, Province of Brandenburg, Kingdom of Prussia
- Spouse: Marie Bethge (m. 1868)
- Issue: Helene von Wardenberg
Names
- German: Friedrich August Eberhard
- House: House of Württemberg
- Father: Prince Paul of Württemberg
- Mother: Princess Charlotte of Saxe-Hildburghausen

Friedrich August Eberhard, Prince of Württemberg (German: Friedrich August Eberhard Prinz von Württemberg; 24 January 1813 in Stuttgart, Kingdom of Württemberg – 12 January 1885 in Ban de Teuffer, Zehdenick, Province of Brandenburg, Kingdom of Prussia) was a royal Prussian Colonel General of the Cavalry with the rank of Generalfeldmarschall and Kommandierender General of the Guards Corps for more than 20 years. August was a member of the House of Württemberg and a Prince of Württemberg by birth.

== Family ==
August was the fifth and youngest child of Prince Paul of Württemberg, brother of William I of Württemberg, and his wife Princess Charlotte of Saxe-Hildburghausen.

== Military career ==
After 16 years of military service to the Kingdom of Württemberg in 1831, August was promoted to Rittmeister in the 1st Cavalry Regiment. In April 1831, August was granted permission by his uncle, William I of Württemberg, to serve in the Prussian Army.

In the Prussian Army, August was assigned initially to the Gardes du Corps and a year later he was promoted to Major. In 1836, August was further promoted to lieutenant colonel and in 1838 to colonel. He served as commander of the Guards Cuirassier Regiment. In 1844, as major general, August assumed the leadership of the 1st Guards Cavalry Brigade and as early as 1850 he was promoted to lieutenant general. From 1854 to 1856 he commanded the 7th Division in Magdeburg. In September 1857, August served as Commanding General of III Corps, but as of 3 June 1858 became commanding general of the Guards Corps. He held the position for 20 years.

In the Austro-Prussian War of 1866, August (by now a General of the Cavalry) and his corps belonged to the Second Army under Crown Prince Frederick William of Prussia. He led it into the victorious battles of Soor and Burkersdorf. The Battle of Königgrätz on 3 July 1866 witnessed the decisive occupation of Chlum (now part of Všestary, known for its cemetery) by his units. However, a significant share of their victories were attributed to August's chief of staff, Lieutenant Colonel Ferdinand von Dannenberg. After the campaign, William I of Prussia awarded August the Order of Pour le Mérite, and appointed him honorary Colonel-in-Chief of the Posen Uhlan Regiment Number 10 in Züllichau, which bore its name until its dissolution in 1919.

In the Franco-Prussian War, the Guard Corps participated in the Battle of Gravelotte-Saint Privat on 18 August 1870. The attack on the broad plain was made hastily and without supporting artillery fire. Even the subsequent envelopment of the enemy by the Royal Saxon Army troops could not therefore be exploited. The Guard Corps, under the leadership of August, was assigned to Albert, Crown Prince of Saxony, and participated in the Battle of Sedan, and in part in the Siege of Paris. Chief of Staff during the later campaign was still Ferdinand von Dannenberg, by now promoted to Major General.

After the war ended, August von Württemberg continued in command of the Guard corps. For his war service, the king awarded him the Oak Leaves of the Pour le Mérite and both classes of the Iron Cross. On 2 September 1873, he was appointed Colonel General of the Cavalry with the rank of Field Marshal. In June 1878, August was transferred to the Oberkommando der Marken, replacing Field Marshal Friedrich Graf von Wrangel, and remained in this position for another four years. On 24 August 1882, he asked for his discharge from active duty, which was granted to him by making him a Knight of the Order of the Black Eagle.

== Death and legacy ==
During a hunting trip in Zehdenick near Berlin, August died on 12 January 1885. His funeral was held four days later at Berlin's Garnisonkirche. He was transferred to Ludwigsburg Palace where he was interred at the palace chapel. Fort August von Württemberg, one of the inner belt of fortifications of the Fortifications of Metz, was named in his honor.

== Württemberger Chamber of Lords ==
As a prince of the Royal House of Württemberg since 1830, August was one of the lords in the Württembergische Landstände, but never took part in their meetings. He was represented by other members of the chamber, the last one being Andreas Renner.

== Marriage and issue ==
August married morganatically to Marie Bethge on 14 November 1868. August and Marie had one daughter:

- Katharina Wilhelmine Helene Charlotte Auguste Hedwig von Wardenberg (Berlin 18 April 1865 – Potsdam 25 September 1938)

∞ Berlin 2 October 1884, General Dedo von Schenck (Mansfeld Castle 11 February 1853 – Wiesbaden 28 April 1918)

- Albrecht von Schenck (20 September 1885 – 10 June 1888)
- Eberhard von Schenck (born 15 Nov 1887) ∞ 14 September 1918, Irmgard Ecker (with issue)
- Freda von Schenck (21 March 1890 – 2 March 1946) ∞ 1910 (div. 1915) Baron Kurt von Reibnitz ∞ 1916 Count Ernst August von der Schulenburg (31 October 1886 – 5 February 1945)
- Dedo von Schenck (23 July 1892 – 15 August 1892)

== Honours ==
- Württemberg:
  - Grand Cross of the Württemberg Crown, 1827
  - Grand Cross of the Friedrich Order
  - Grand Cross of the Military Merit Order, 30 December 1870
- (Saxe-Coburg and Gotha) (Duchy of Saxe-Altenburg) (Saxe-Meiningen) Ernestine duchies: Grand Cross of the Saxe-Ernestine House Order, February 1837
- Kingdom of Prussia:
  - Knight of the Black Eagle, 14 June 1838; with Collar, 1847; in Diamonds, 1882
  - Grand Cross of the Red Eagle, 1 June 1870
  - Iron Cross (1870), 1st and 2nd Classes
  - Pour le Mérite (military), 3 August 1866; with Oak Leaves, 16 June 1871
  - Grand Commander's Cross of the Royal House Order of Hohenzollern, with Star, 10 September 1872
- Russian Empire:
  - Knight of St. Andrew, 1843
  - Knight of St. Alexander Nevsky, 1843
  - Knight of the White Eagle, 1843
  - Knight of St. Anna, 1st Class, 1843
  - Knight of St. George, 3rd Class, 29 September 1870
- Kingdom of Hanover:
  - Grand Cross of the Royal Guelphic Order, 1843
  - Knight of St. George, 1856
- Kingdom of Bavaria: Knight of St. Hubert, 1853
- Ascanian duchies: Grand Cross of Albert the Bear, 14 May 1855
- Nassau: Knight of the Gold Lion of Nassau, February 1859
- Brunswick: Grand Cross of Henry the Lion
- Baden:
  - Grand Cross of the House Order of Fidelity, 1867
  - Grand Cross of the Zähringer Lion, 1867
- Kingdom of Saxony: Commander of the Military Order of St. Henry, 1st Class, 1870
- Sweden-Norway: Knight of the Seraphim, 29 May 1875
- Belgium: Grand Cordon of the Order of Leopold (military), 25 February 1878
- Netherlands: Commander of the Military William Order, 25 August 1878

== Ancestry ==
Ancestors of Prince August of Württemberg

8. Frederick II Eugene, Duke of Württemberg
4. Frederick I of Württemberg
9. Friederike Dorothea of Brandenburg-Schwedt
2. Prince Paul of Württemberg
10. Charles William Ferdinand, Duke of Brunswick
5. Duchess Augusta of Brunswick-Wolfenbüttel
11. Princess Augusta of Great Britain
1. Prince August of Württemberg
12. Ernest Frederick III, Duke of Saxe-Hildburghausen
6. Frederick, Duke of Saxe-Altenburg
13. Princess Ernestine of Saxe-Weimar
3. Princess Charlotte of Saxe-Hildburghausen
14. Charles II, Grand Duke of Mecklenburg
7. Duchess Charlotte Georgine of Mecklenburg-Strelitz
15. Princess Friederike of Hesse-Darmstadt

== Literature ==
- Wolfgang Hausen: Königlich Preußischer Generaloberst der Kavallerie mit dem Range eines Generalfeldmarschalls Prinz August von Württemberg. In: Deutsches Soldatenjahrbuch 1985; Schild Verlag, München 1985; ISBN 3-88014-082-0.
