= William I of Württemberg =

King of Württemberg from 1816 to 1864

William I
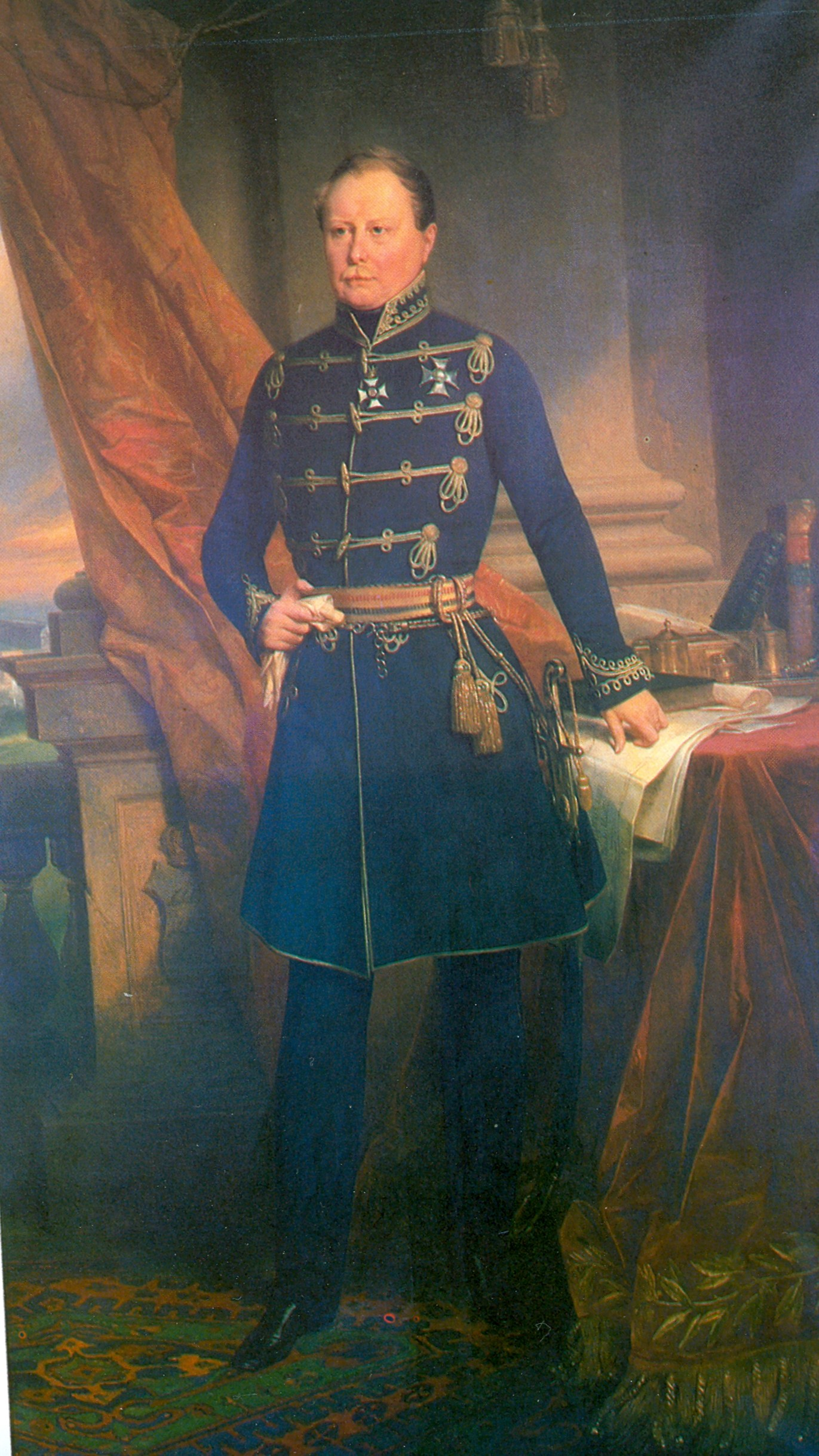
- Portrait by Joseph Karl Stieler, 1827

King of Württemberg
- Reign: 30 October 1816 – 25 June 1864
- Predecessor: Frederick I
- Successor: Charles I
- Born: 27 September 1781; Lüben, Kingdom of Prussia (now Lubin, Poland)
- Died: 25 June 1864 (aged 82); Rosenstein Palace, Stuttgart, Württemberg, German Confederation
- Burial: 30 June 1864; Württemberg Mausoleum
- Spouses: Caroline Augusta of Bavaria (m. 1808; div. 1814) Catherine Pavlovna of Russia (m. 1816; died 1819) Pauline Therese of Württemberg (m. 1820)
- Issue: Marie, Countess of Neipperg; Sophie, Queen of the Netherlands; Princess Catherine of Württemberg; Charles I, King of Württemberg; Augusta, Princess of Saxe-Weimar-Eisenach
- House: Württemberg
- Father: Frederick I of Württemberg
- Mother: Augusta of Brunswick-Wolfenbüttel
- Religion: Lutheranism

William I (German: Friedrich Wilhelm Karl; 27 September 1781 – 25 June 1864) was King of Württemberg from 30 October 1816 until his death.

Upon William's accession, Württemberg was suffering crop failures and famine in the "Year Without a Summer", in 1816. After taking office, he initiated sweeping reforms, resulting in the approval of the Estates of Württemberg to a constitution on 25 September 1819. In his 47-year reign, the kingdom moved from one that was created from different denominational principalities and a heterogeneous agricultural country, into a constitutional state with a common identity and a well-organised management.

In addition to his successful domestic policy, he pursued throughout his reign an ambition focused on German and European foreign policy. Alongside the great powers of Prussia and Austria, he imagined a third major German power in the form of Bavaria, Saxony, Hanover and Württemberg. Although this plan never succeeded, it ensured a consistent, coherent and targeted policy during his reign.

William was the only German monarch who was forced to recognise the Frankfurt Constitution of 1848. After the failure of the March Revolution of 1848, he pursued reactionary policies that counteracted his liberal image from before the revolution. He died in 1864 at Rosenstein Castle in Bad Cannstatt and is buried in the Württemberg Mausoleum.

== Life ==
=== Youth ===
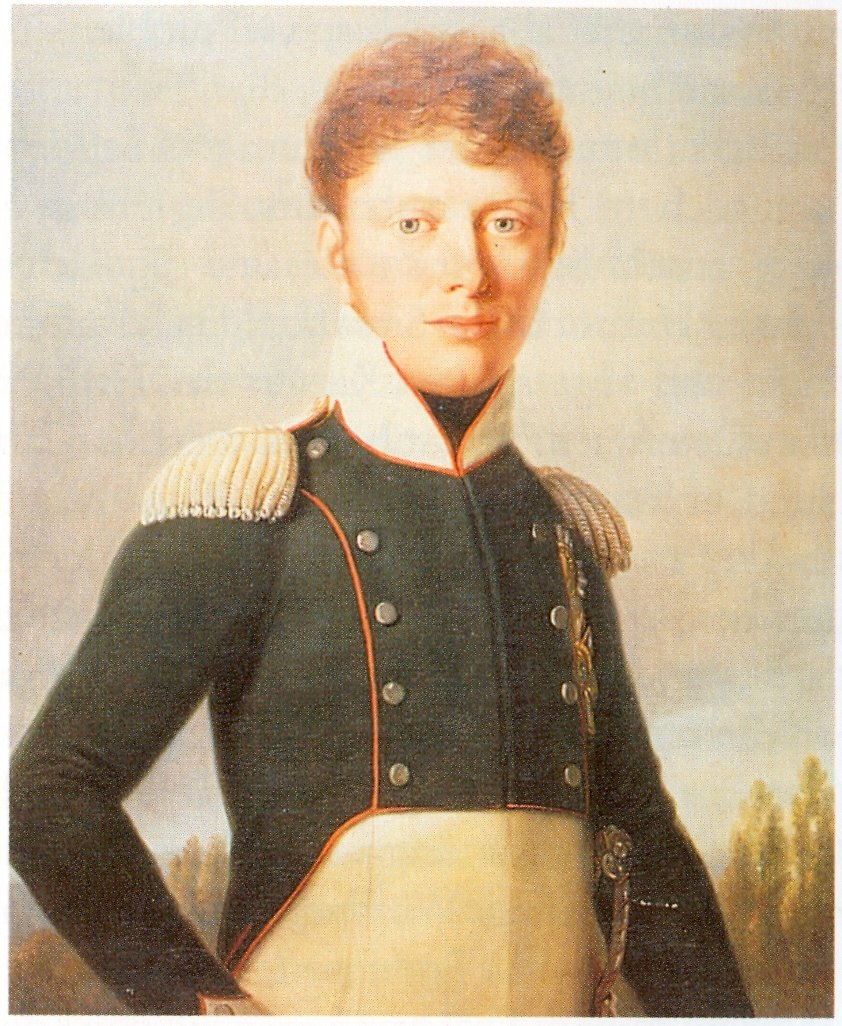
Portrait of a young Frederick William

Born at Lüben (after 1945 Lubin, Poland) on 27 September 1781, Frederick William (known as "Fritz" until the beginning of his reign) was the son of Duke Frederick William Charles of Württemberg (1754–1816) and his wife, Augusta of Brunswick-Wolfenbüttel (1764–1788).

The relationship between his mother and father was one of strife and discord. His father had entered the Prussian Army in 1774, then moved shortly after William's birth to the service of the Russian Empress, Catherine the Great, who appointed him Governor of Eastern Finland. Although William's mother gave birth in 1783 to his sister Catharina Frederica, then later that year to Sophia Dorothea, and Paul in 1785, the relationship between the parents continued to deteriorate. Augusta sought sanctuary from her abusive marriage and asked the Empress for protection in 1786. Catherine forced Frederick and his children to leave Russia and placed Augusta in the custody of a former royal huntsman, Reinhold Wilhelm von Pohlmann, by whom she allegedly later became pregnant. In the exhumation ordered by William himself, several years after, this was proven wrong. She died in 1788. In 1790, Frederick and his two sons moved to Ludwigsburg Palace. He made sure that his sons' educators were from Württemberg and their education, at the behest of their father, was regulated and very strict.

Charles Eugene, Duke of Württemberg died on 24 October 1793. He had ruled for 56 years and as he had no legitimate offspring, the duchy passed to his brothers, Louis Eugene in 1793, then two years later to Frederick II Eugene, who was Frederick William's grandfather. Frederick William's father thus became Hereditary Prince (Erbprinz) in 1795, then duke on 23 December 1797. In 1797, Duke Frederick's father married Charlotte, Princess Royal, the daughter of King George III of Great Britain. They then began to look for a wife for Frederick William and potential brides included the Holy Roman Emperor's sister, Archduchess Maria Amalia, and the Grand Duchesses Alexandra Pavlovna and Maria Pavlovna.

Duke Frederick's relationship with his son also deteriorated. Frederick William often rebelled against his upbringing and his father. In 1799, Frederick William's escape plans were discovered and his father had him temporarily arrested. After his release, Frederick William began studying at the University of Tübingen. After the War of the Second Coalition erupted and France marched under Napoleon in the spring of 1800, Frederick William, who had joined as a volunteer in the Austrian army, participated in the Battle of Hohenlinden in December 1800. In 1803 he attained the rank of Imperial Major General. Contemporaries have credited him with profound military knowledge, courage and bravery.

After returning to Württemberg in 1801, Frederick William and his brother Paul began liaisons with the daughters of the landscape architect, Konradin von Abel. Frederick William fell in love with Therese von Abel, four years his senior. At that time there were clashes between Duke Frederick and the Estates of Württemberg (the Landstände) on domestic and foreign policy issues. Konradin von Abel represented the foreign policy interests of the estates and was supported by Frederick William, who moved against the interests of his father's policies. In 1803 Frederick William fled Württemberg to Paris, Vienna, Schaffhausen and Saarburg. In Saarburg, Therese gave birth to twins, who died shortly after birth. Now Elector of Württemberg, Frederick wanted to bring his son back to Württemberg. Frederick William went in October to Paris, where he was received on 14 October by Napoleon. Elector Frederick prevented the planned marriage of his son with Therese von Abel through diplomatic interventions, though separating the two did not happen until the autumn of 1804. During his time in Paris, Frederick William received financial support from the Landstände and later from Napoleon.

=== Heir to the throne ===
On 11 September 1805 Frederick William left Paris and returned (after a visit to his grandparents, the Duke and Duchess of Brunswick-Wolfenbüttel in Brunswick) to Stuttgart, where in November he met his father for the first time in a few years. His return was mainly due to the change in the political climate. The United Kingdom, which had been at war with Napoleon since 1803, formed an alliance with Russia and Austria. Napoleon had Württemberg's neighbours of Baden and Bavaria on his side, so Württemberg was forced, after some hesitation, to yield to French pressure and also enter into an alliance with Napoleon. The French Foreign Minister Talleyrand suggested a coup against Elector Frederick, in which his son was to replace him, but Frederick William opposed the suggestion. This act is regarded as the main reason for William's subsequent aversion to Napoleon. Frederick refused to involve his son in the affairs of state, but gave him his own court headed by his friend, Ernst von Pfuel-Riepurr, who had accompanied him in his time out of the country. Frederick William took the time to further his education, including acquiring a knowledge of agriculture.

From 1 January 1806, the territorial gains as a result of the German mediatization enlarged the Electorate of Württemberg and it became a kingdom upon the dissolution of the Holy Roman Empire. In 1806, Prussia joined the coalition against Napoleon and was defeated and occupied within a few weeks. Napoleon wanted Württemberg to be bound to him closer by marriage. On 13 August 1807 Frederick William's sister, Catherine, married Napoleon's brother Jérôme, the king of the newly created Kingdom of Westphalia. In order to prevent Napoleon arranging a marriage for him, Frederick William sought permission from his father to marry Charlotte (later Caroline) Augusta, the daughter of the Bavarian King Maximilian I Joseph. After lengthy negotiations took place, the pair were married on 8 June 1808 in Munich. Since it was purely a marriage of convenience and Frederick William had no interest in a deeper relationship with his wife, Charlotte became increasingly lonely in Stuttgart. Frederick often stayed in Kassel at the court of his brother-in-law, Jérôme. Here he met Jérôme's former lover, Blanche La Flèche, Baroness of Keudelstein. He began an affair with her, which he later continued as king.

In 1809, Napoléon had Württemberg commit troops for his war against Austria, while safeguarding its own eastern borders. Frederick William received the command of the troops deployed for border defence. During Napoleon's Russian campaign, Frederick William was again in command of troops. The campaign was devastating for the Army of Württemberg. Of the 15,800 soldiers, only a few hundred returned to Württemberg. After the Battle of Leipzig from 16 to 19 October 1813, Württemberg moved to the side of the coalition against Napoleon. Frederick William then took over the command of the Army of Württemberg, which was reinforced by Austrian troops in November. On 30 December the army crossed the Rhine at Hüningen.

Despite having suffered heavy losses in 1812 and 1813 fighting as an ally of France, Württemberg agreed to raise an army for the Allies of 12,250 regular infantry, 2,900 cavalry and 12,250 militia. By strenuous efforts this quota was filled. At first, the Württemberger contingent was designated the German VI Corps, but in a subsequent reorganization it became the IV Corps in the main Allied army of Austrian Field Marshal Karl Philipp, Prince of Schwarzenberg. It marched to war with 14,000 men and 24 artillery pieces. Frederick William directed his corps in the First Battle of Bar-sur-Aube on 24 January 1814. One source asserted that IV Corps suffered 900 casualties in this combat while their Austrian allies lost 837. French losses were about 1,200. The IV Corps participated in the Allied victory over Napoleon at the Battle of La Rothière on 1 February.

On 18 February 1814, Schwarzenberg ordered Frederick William to hold Montereau until evening. Accordingly, the Crown Prince placed 8,500 foot soldiers, 1,000 horsemen and 26 artillery pieces on the north bank of the Seine River. The defending force included an Austrian brigade. The first French attacks in the morning were driven off, but by the mid-afternoon Napoleon was on the scene with 30,000 troops and 70 cannons. Frederick William ordered a retreat, but the movement quickly degenerated into a mad dash for safety across the single bridge with French cavalry in hot pursuit. The Allies lost 2,600 killed and wounded, plus 3,400 soldiers and 15 field pieces captured. The French lost 2,000 but captured the vital bridge intact. The Württembergers reported 806 killed and wounded, not counting prisoners.

On 25 March, the main Allied army came upon a 19,000-man French corps by surprise in the Battle of Fère-Champenoise. Leading the advance, Frederick William decided not to wait for his infantry to catch up but to attack with his cavalry alone. The result was a crushing Allied victory as the French corps suffered losses of 2,000 killed and wounded while losing 4,000 prisoners, 45 cannons and 100 ammunition wagons. A nearby 4,300-strong French division with 16 cannons was also caught and completely wiped out. The Allies sustained 2,000 casualties out of 28,000 men and 80 guns engaged. At the Battle of Paris on 30 March, 6,500 Württembergers fought, losing 160 killed, wounded and captured.

With the fall of Napoleon, Frederick William took the opportunity to begin divorce proceedings from his wife. He had been in the United Kingdom in June 1814 with his cousin Grand Duchess Catherine of Russia, the widow of Duke George of Oldenburg, and the two were in love. After Charlotte, King Frederick and King Maximilian Joseph had agreed to the divorce, a divorce court was convened by King Frederick on 31 August 1814. Both parties had indicated that the marriage was not consummated because of animosity. Dispensation by Pope Pius VII, which was necessary because Charlotte was Catholic, did not take place until over a year later on 12 January 1816, shortly before the wedding of Frederick William and Catherine. Charlotte then married on 10 November 1816, the Austrian Emperor Francis I.

Frederick William and Catherine also attended the Congress of Vienna from September 1814, where diplomats drew up a new Europe following Napoleon's downfall. After the return of Napoleon and the subsequent war in 1815, Frederick William commanded the Austrian III Corps which in one of the minor campaigns invaded France and besieged General Jean Rapp in Strasbourg. He was the only member of the ruling German royal families who participated actively as a military commander in the wars of 1814 and 1815. Wilhelm Hauff celebrated this in his poem Prinz Wilhelm.

On 24 January 1816, Frederick William married Catherine in St. Petersburg. The newly-weds stayed in Russia for a few months and arrived in Stuttgart on 13 April 1816.

=== Early reign ===
==== Accession ====
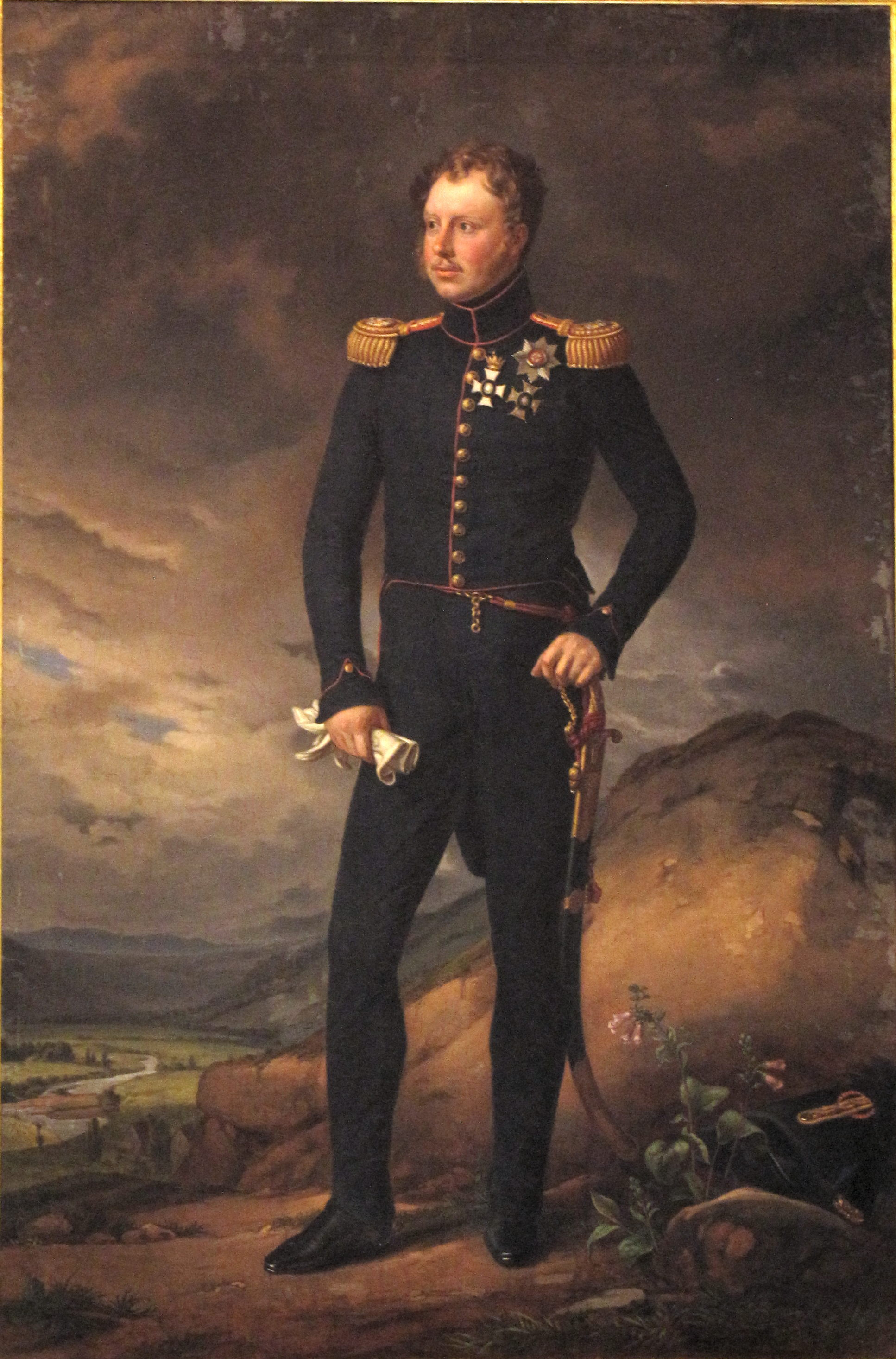
King William by Joseph Karl Stieler, 1822

King Frederick died on 30 October 1816, at 1:30 am. On the same day, Catherine, who already had two sons from her first marriage, gave birth to their daughter Marie Friederike Charlotte. Although in King Frederick's declining years, he and his son no longer had any political and personal conflicts, Frederick William was eager to display a new era of political change and power. As such, he did away with his first name of Frederick and chose his second name of Wilhelm (William) as his regnal name. He reduced the monarchical titles to simply Wilhelm, by the Grace of God, King of Württemberg. The national coat of arms was also simplified and he reduced the colours of the state flag of black, red and gold, to simply black and red. He also announced an amnesty for civil and military prisoners. William dismissed most of the ministers of state, made the Privy Council his government and gave new senior positions at court and in the civil service.

==== Measures against economic hardship ====
William's accession to the throne fell into a time of great economic hardship. In April 1815, Mount Tambora erupted in the Dutch East Indies, which led to a long-term deterioration of global weather conditions. In the spring and summer of 1816 there was nowhere in Europe without a storm, rain or hail. In October the first snow fell in Württemberg. The year 1816 became known as the Year Without A Summer. In Württemberg, there were crop failures which gave rise to food prices. In the winter of 1816/1817, famine broke out. To alleviate the plight, the government fixed maximum prices for food, made exporting difficult and later banned it. Large amounts of grain were brought from outside the country. The famine was alleviated by the King and Queen, whose policies were aimed at long-term improvement in the economic situation of all social classes. William implemented agricultural reforms, while Catherine devoted her care to the poor. On 20 November 1818 William set up an Agricultural Academy in Hohenheim to radically improve general nutrition in the kingdom through teaching, experimentation and demonstration and, in so doing, laid the foundation for the University of Hohenheim. To help people to help themselves, the government planted alleys of fruit-trees. (Dienstbarkeit on private ground near streets). The tree farms from William, also the Moravian Church delivered for free.

In the same year he set up the Cannstatter Volksfest, which was to take place annually on 28 September, a day after the king's birthday. William bought cattle and sheep from abroad for farmers to raise them in Württemberg and he was known for his Arabian stallions that formed part of the Marbach stud. Around the country, Catherine set up charities, which were controlled by a national charity in Stuttgart. Donations were received from the private property of the royal couple, by Catherine's mother the Tsarina, and by other members of the royal family. The Württembergische Landessparkasse (Wurttemberg State Savings Bank) was established on 12 May 1818 on Catherine's initiative. At the same time, a poor relief authority was set up in the Ministry of Interior. The completion of the Katharinenhospital in 1828 was initiated via a donation by Catherine in 1817. The Mohrenköpfle is a breed of pig. On the orders of King William I, these "masked" pigs were imported from Central China in 1820/21, in order to improve pig breeding in the Kingdom of Württemberg. Cross-breeding local breeds with these "Chinese pigs" was particularly successful within stocks of domestic pigs in the Hohenlohe region and the area around the town of Schwäbisch Hall.

==== Death of Queen Catherine ====
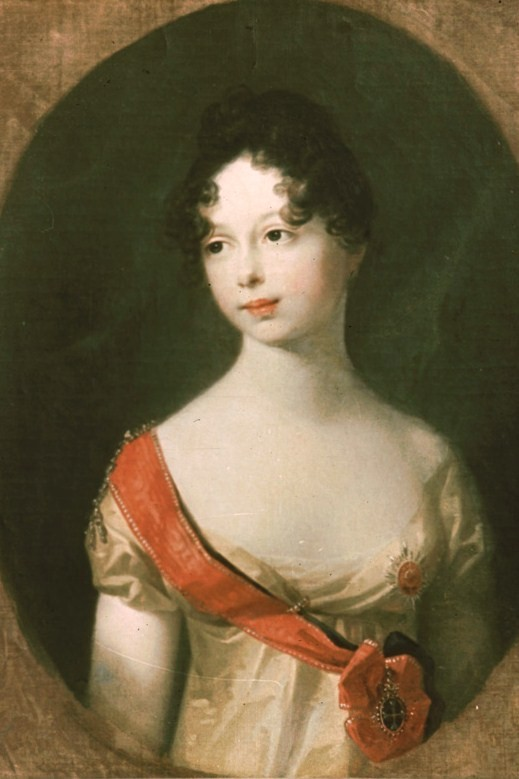
Queen Catherine in 1810's

Catherine and William's second daughter Sophie, who later became Queen of the Netherlands, was born on 17 June 1818. Despite the outwardly harmonious marriage of William and Catherine, William had extramarital affairs. He took to his former lover Blanche La Flèche again. Eduard von Kallee, born on 26 February 1818 is thought to have been his illegitimate son. When Catherine found her husband in Scharnhausen on 3 January 1819, with a lover (presumably Blanche La Fleche), she travelled back to Stuttgart. She died of complications from pneumonia on 9 January. William had the Württemberg Mausoleum constructed for her on Württemberg Hill and she was buried in 1824. To cover up the circumstances of her death he tried to obtain her letters, which he suspected contained information about his love affairs. The main political reason for this was so Württemberg's relationship with Russia would not be strained. William wrote in a letter that he was considering abdication. He wanted his brother Paul to renounce his claim to the throne, in favour of Paul's son, Frederick. After their mother's death, Catherine's sons by her first marriage went to live with their grandfather, Peter, the-then regent and later Grand Duke of Oldenburg.

=== Period of consolidation ===
==== Family and private life ====
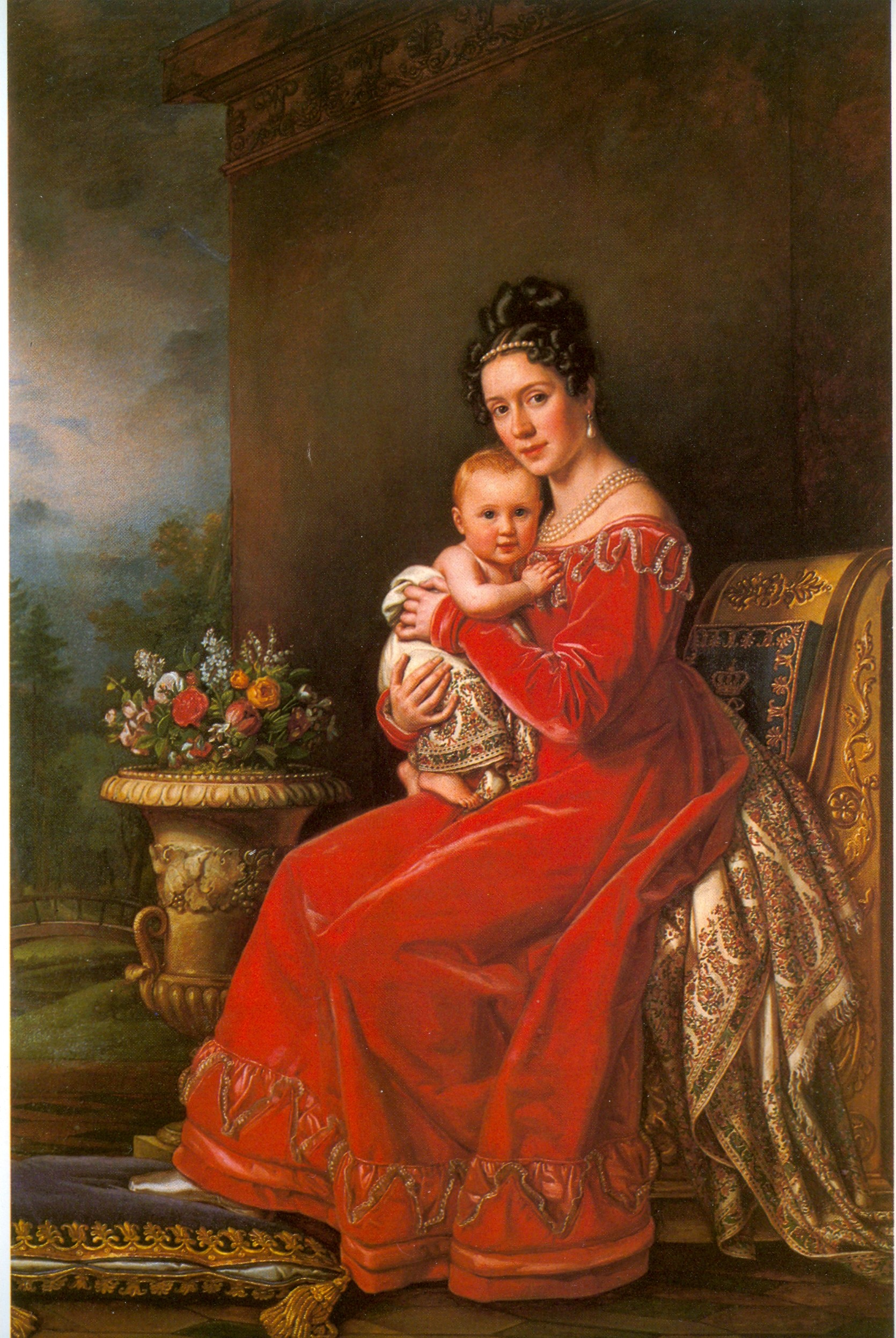
Queen Pauline and her son Charles in 1825

Soon after the death of Queen Catherine, William sought a new marriage. He looked again to a cousin, Pauline (1800–1873) who was the daughter of his uncle Louis and 19 years his junior. The wedding took place on 19 April 1820 at Stuttgart. Pauline tended to be rather pious and was a prude. For example, when her daughter was to be painted naked as a baby, Pauline refused it. The beginning of the marriage was outwardly harmonious and the royal couple undertook official duties and many activities together. On 24 August 1821 their first daughter Catherine was born. The birth of the heir Charles on 6 March 1823 was received by the people and the royal family with great joy. Their third child Augusta was born on 4 October 1826.

William continued to maintain extramarital relationships with other women. When travelling to Italy, he continued to meet with Blanche La Flèche. In the late 1820s, the royal couple became increasingly alienated. William began a relationship with the actress Amalie of Stubenrauch. Born in 1803, she started her acting career in 1823 at the Munich Court Theatre. After a stint in March 1827, in the autumn of 1828 she became permanent at the Stuttgart Court Theatre, where William soon became aware of her. William and Amelia would keep up their relationship until William's death in 1864.

==== Politics ====
In October 1820 a manuscript entitled Manuskript aus Süddeutschland (Manuscript from Southern Germany) was published in London. The book contained a review of the historical development and the political situation in Germany. It called for a further mediatisation of small countries in Germany to the four central states of Bavaria, Saxony, Hanover and Württemberg, which together should form a counterweight to the great powers of Prussia and Austria. It was suggested Württemberg should gain Baden, the principalities of Hohenzollern-Hechingen and Hohenzollern-Sigmaringen, as well as Alsace. Soon it became known that the published name of the author and editor of the book were fake. The real author was Friedrich Ludwig Lindner (1772–1845), who was somewhat of a personal assistant to William. It was assumed that William was behind this idea and that Lindner acted as his ghostwriter. The manuscript caused diplomatic tensions between Prussia and Austria on one side and Württemberg on the other. At the Congress of Verona in 1822, the great powers of Austria, Prussia and Russia launched an isolation on Württemberg. In the spring of 1823, diplomatic relations were broken off, the foreign minister, Count Wintzingerode, and the Bundestag envoy, Freiherr von Wangenheim, resigned. The popularity of William rose in liberal circles. Reprisals, however, meant that William had to give in. In November 1824 Württemberg agreed to an extension of the anti-liberal Carlsbad Decrees.

After the successful French July Revolution of 1830, the Liberals were buoyant in most of Europe, as well as in Württemberg. The November Uprising in Congress Poland against Russia in 1830/1831 reinforced this trend. In December 1831, the Liberals won the elections to the second chamber of the Württemberg Landtag. At the Hambach Festival on 27 May 1832, in which Hambach Castle in the Rhineland-Palatinate was a backdrop for liberal and democratic rallies, the call for banned political gatherings was answered. William moved to convene the parliament elected in 1831 for over a year until 15 January 1833. After the dissolution of parliament on 22 March, elections were held in April, and Friedrich Römer's liberals again emerged victorious.

Diplomatic relations between Württemberg and Prussia and Austria were also limited at this time. From 1836 William tried to better relations with Prussia. In September 1836 Prince William, later German Emperor, visited Stuttgart. 1838 saw a return visit by King William to Berlin, where he and cousin, the Tsar Nicholas I met. From this point, a Prussian envoy in Württemberg was established. At various times William was interested in forming a "Third Germany" of smaller states outside the control of Vienna and Berlin, but this never took form.

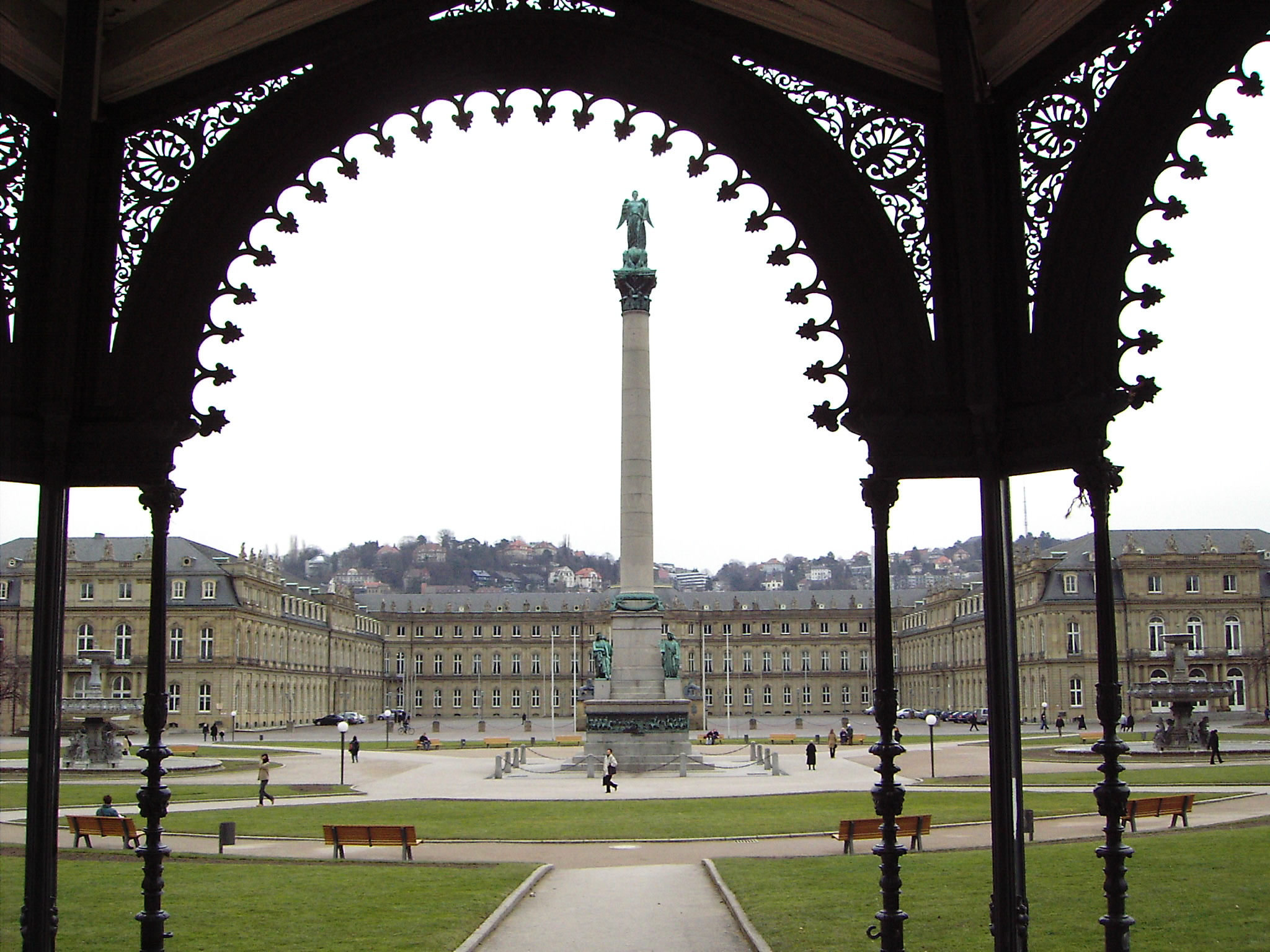
The Jubiläumssäule on the Schlossplatz in Stuttgart

One area of co-operation with Prussia was the Zollverein customs union. William signed a Bavaria–Württemberg Customs Union (BWCU) in 1828, with mixed results. In 1828–34 the BWCU signed commercial agreements and then became full members of the German Customs Union. Seen now as a precursor of German unity under Prussia in 1871, at the time it was hoped that stronger local economies would preserve the independence of the smaller states such as Württemberg.

The 1830s were characterised by an economic boom in Württemberg. Agriculture, trade and crafts flourished and debt and taxes were down. Shipping on the Neckar via the Wilhelmskanal had become possible in 1821, and the road network was expanded. Plans were produced for the construction of the first railways. William was very interested in the emerging industrialisation and visited, in 1837, the United Kingdom, the birthplace of the Industrial Revolution. For his Silver Jubilee in 1841, the kingdom was in excellent financial shape. On 27 September 1841 William celebrated his 60th birthday. On 28 September, a procession took place in Stuttgart with 10,390 participants, including 640 riders and 23 horses and wagons with teams of oxen from the entire kingdom. 200,000 spectators had come to the capital, which had 40,000 inhabitants. On the Schlossplatz a solid wooden column was built, which was replaced two years later by the central stone "Jubiläumssäule" (Jubilee Pillar). The whole town was decorated, fireworks were set off in the evening and bonfires were made all around the country. William was celebrated by patriotic poems and songs in the newspapers. The celebrations and participation around the country expressed how the country had become unified and connected under William's reign.

=== Revolution of 1848/1849 ===
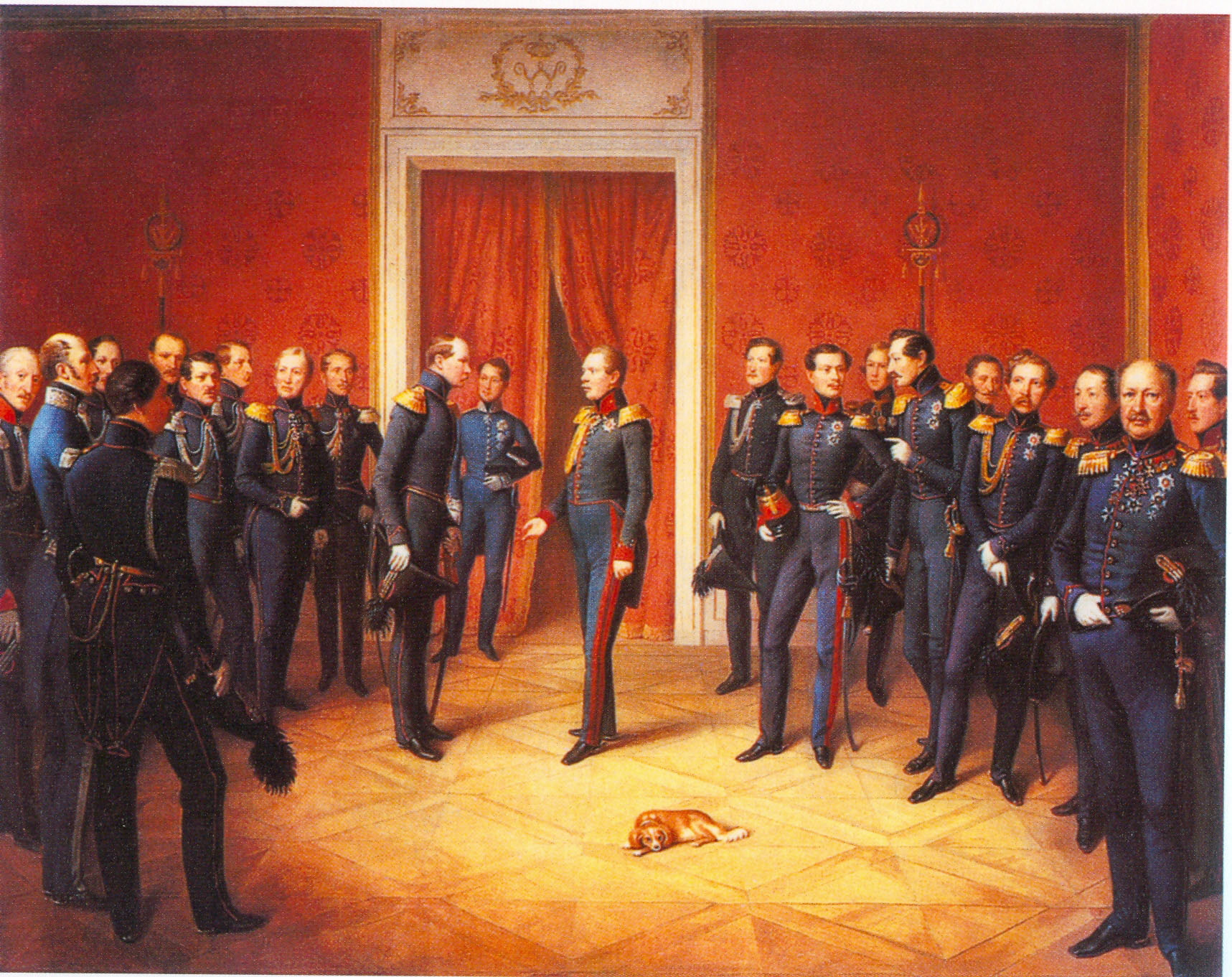
"Reporting to King William" (1847) by Stirnbrand. All the participants are identified on the painting's page at Wikimedia Commons.

In 1846 and 1847, poor harvests in Württemberg gave rise to famine and increased emigration. The relatively satisfied mood of the population became sour. Liberal and democratic demands were expressed more forcefully. In January 1848 a protest in Stuttgart called for an all-German Federal Parliament, freedom of the press, freedom of association and assembly, introduction of jury trials and arming of the people. In February, a revolution broke out again in France. When Louis Philippe I abdicated and fled into exile to England, William recognised the urgency of the situation and tried the stop the revolution through concessions to the liberals and democrats. On 1 March he reinstated the liberal press law of 1817, which had been overturned previously by the Carlsbad Decrees in 1819. He tried to replace the Privy Council under the conservative Joseph von Linden, but this failed on 6 March as a result of further protests. William then agreed to forming a liberal government under Friedrich Römer. On 18 March 1848 the Württemberg army was sworn not to the king but to the Constitution. Although Römer never had the confidence of William, he made sure that during the revolution in Württemberg, a majority for the abolition of the monarchy was never formed. In April, the Württemberg army was involved in the crackdown on the Baden Revolution of Friedrich Hecker and Gustav von Struve in Baden. In June 1848, a new parliament was selected in which Römer's liberals again received the majority in the upper chamber. William visited Frankfurt in July 1848, where since 18 May that year the Frankfurt Parliament met and on 29 June 1848 and had chosen Archduke John of Austria to be regent. The parliament proposed, on 8 March 1849, that Frederick William of Prussia should be elected Emperor of Germany. Römer advised William to accept this choice, but if Frederick William refused, Römer advised William he had a good chance of being elected emperor himself. This flattery increased, however, only the mistrust of William against Römer.

On 20 April 1849 the Chamber of Deputies voted in the Landtag with only two dissenting votes in favour of recognising the constitution drafted by the Frankfurt Parliament on 28 March 1849. William refused to do so and justified his refusal in a supplement to the Schwäbischer Merkur (Swabian Mercury) with a circulation of 12,000 copies. Given the tricky situation of Stuttgart, he moved his court to the garrison city of Ludwigsburg. On 25 April, William decided to accept the constitution. But he felt it was imposed humiliation, which was multiplied when he realized that he was the only ruler of a larger German state who had accepted the Constitution.

After the Frankfurt Parliament had failed with the rejection of the German imperial crown by Frederick William IV of Prussia, on 30 May 1849 the remaining members decided to relocate the parliament to Stuttgart. Derisively known as the Rumpfparlament ("rump parliament"), on 6 June 1849, the remaining 154 deputies met initially under President Wilhelm Loewe in Stuttgart. Following its view of itself as the legitimate German parliament, the rump parliament called for tax resistance and military resistance against those states that did not accept the Paulskirche Constitution. Since this view also diminished the autonomy of Württemberg, and the Prussian army was successfully crushing the rebellions in the nearby Baden and the Palatinate, the Württemberg government rapidly distanced itself from the rump parliament.

On 17 June the president of the parliament was informed that the Württemberg government was no longer in a position to tolerate the meetings that had moved to its territory, nor the activities of the regency elected on the 6th, anywhere in Stuttgart or Württemberg. At this point, the rump parliament had only 99 deputies and did not reach a quorum according to its own rules. On 18 June the Württemberg army occupied the parliamentary chamber before the session started. The deputies reacted by organising an impromptu protest march which was promptly squashed by the soldiers without bloodshed. Those deputies that were not from Württemberg were expelled.

On 2 July William returned to Stuttgart. In August 1849 elections were held for a Constituent Assembly in which the democrats reached the majority against the moderate liberals. While the liberals called for the right to an income level and assets, the democrats demanded universal, equal and direct suffrage for all adult men. At the end of October 1849 the king dismissed the government under Friedrich Römer. On 7 December 1849 the principalities of Hohenzollern-Hechingen and Hohenzollern-Sigmaringen were incorporated into the Kingdom of Prussia. William's objective of mediatising these states into Württemberg therefore failed. The-then shattered relationship with Prussia was not normalised until 1852 with the resumption of diplomatic relations.

From 1850 William led a reactionary policy. His experience in the revolution led him to reject generally representative governments. He wanted the people to be "free from the periodic fever of elections". On 2 July 1850 he set up a new government with the conservative Joseph von Linden as Minister of the Interior. He was a more compliant rubber stamp for William's restoration policy. The old constitution was re-enacted, the army was sworn in again on the king rather than the Constitution, corporal punishment was reintroduced in 1852 and the death penalty in 1853. Linden's conservative cabinet remained until shortly after William's death in office.

=== Later years and death ===
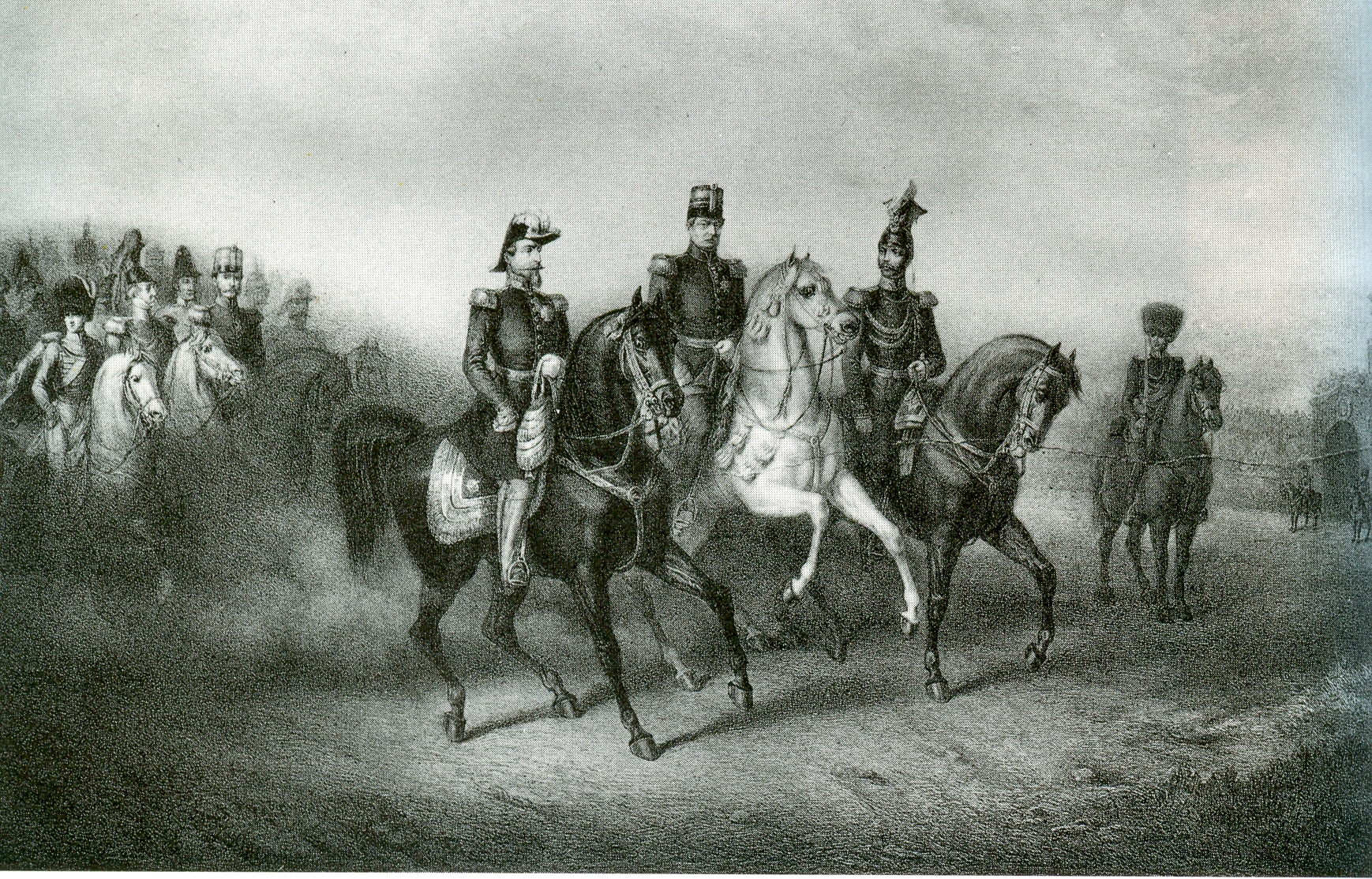
Napoleon III, William I and Alexander II at the Meeting of the Two Emperors at Stuttgart in 1857

In the 1850s, the polarity between Prussia and Austria came to a head in Germany. William pursued a foreign policy strategy shifting alliances and agreements with the major European powers. In the Crimean War between Russia on one hand and the Ottoman Empire, France and Great Britain on the other, he pushed for a neutrality of the German Confederation. This strengthened the position of the Württemberg ally of Russia. After the Crimean War, William tried to normalise his country's relations with France. The French emperor since 1852, Napoléon III, was the nephew of his brother-in-law, Jérôme Bonaparte.

The Holy Alliance between Russia, Austria and Prussia had ended on the outbreak of the Crimean War. On 27 September 1857 a meeting organised by William was held in Stuttgart between Napoléon III and Tsar Alexander II. The emperors agreed that Russia would not intervene in any war that France would have in assisting Sardinia in a war against Austria (later to become the Second Italian War of Independence). Especially in his old age, European princes often sought his advice. His biographer Paul Sauer therefore referred to him as "Nestor among the princes of Europe".

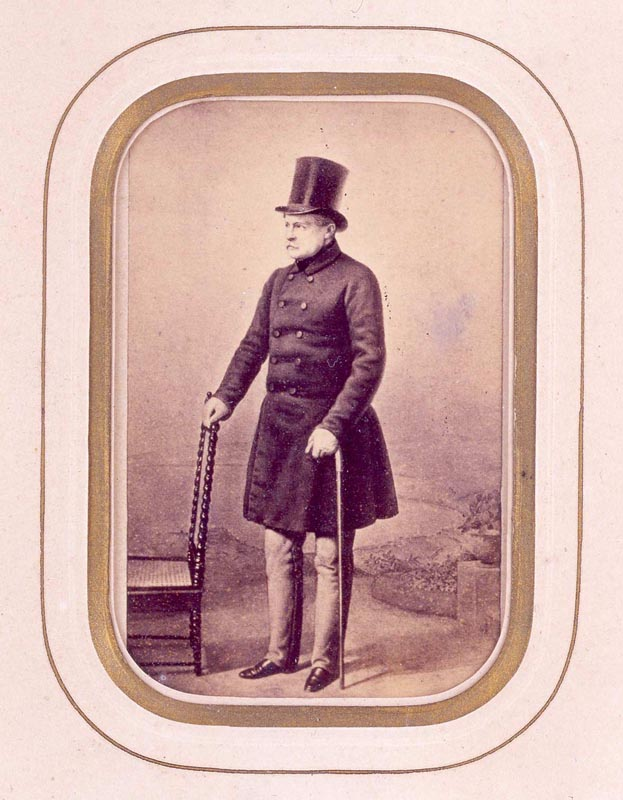
King William in 1861

William's marriage looked happy to outsiders, but in actuality was completely shattered. He was constantly accompanied by his mistress, Amalie, on private visits. He did not trust his son, Prince Charles, to take over governmental functions; Charles's homosexual inclinations troubled him. He was very fond of his daughter-in-law and niece, Crown Princess Olga. She often had to mediate between her husband and her father-in-law, which over long periods led to a tense relationship between her and William. His daughters from his marriage to Catherine both had marital disputes with their husbands, Alfred von Neipperg and William III of the Netherlands.

King William became increasingly hard of hearing with age and underwent frequent treatment from the 1850s. In the autumn of 1863, his condition deteriorated. He had little contact with his family, whereas his mistress Amalie was constantly with him. He was often visited by the writer Friedrich Wilhelm Hackländer. Before his death, he had his private letters and records destroyed.

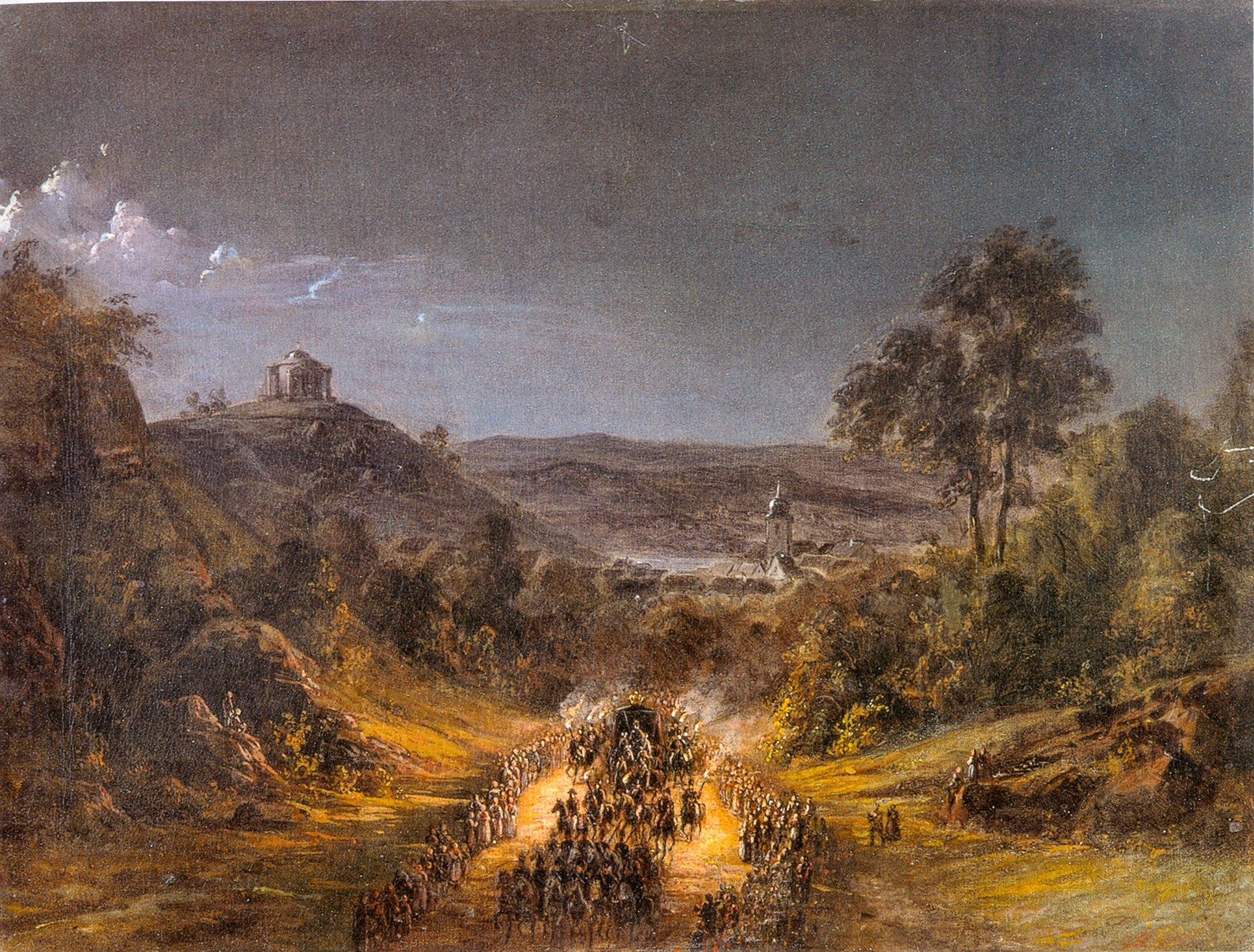
Transfer of the body of William I, in the early morning hours of 30 June 1864, to the Württemberg Mausoleum

William died at 5:10 on the morning of 25 June 1864 at Rosenstein Palace in the presence of his personal physician, Dr. Karl Alsatian, and a valet. On the morning of 30 June, in the presence of his son and successor, King Charles and his stepson Peter of Oldenburg, he was buried alongside his second wife Catherine in the Württemberg Mausoleum. A few hours later, a memorial service was held there in which his widow Queen Pauline, his daughter-in-law Queen Olga, his daughters Queen Sophie of the Netherlands, Princess Catherine and Princess Augusta of Saxe-Weimar-Eisenach, his nephew Grand Duke Constantine of Russia and his stepson Peter of Oldenburg, were present.

While William did not mention his wife Pauline in his will, he made sure that his former mistresses Therese of Abel and Blanche La Flèche received pensions. Queen Pauline and King Charles insisted Amalie of Stubenrauch left court and she moved to an estate in Tegernsee, located next to the Villa Arco, which they had acquired in 1862. She died there on 14 April 1876 and was buried in Tegernsee.

== Marriages and issue ==
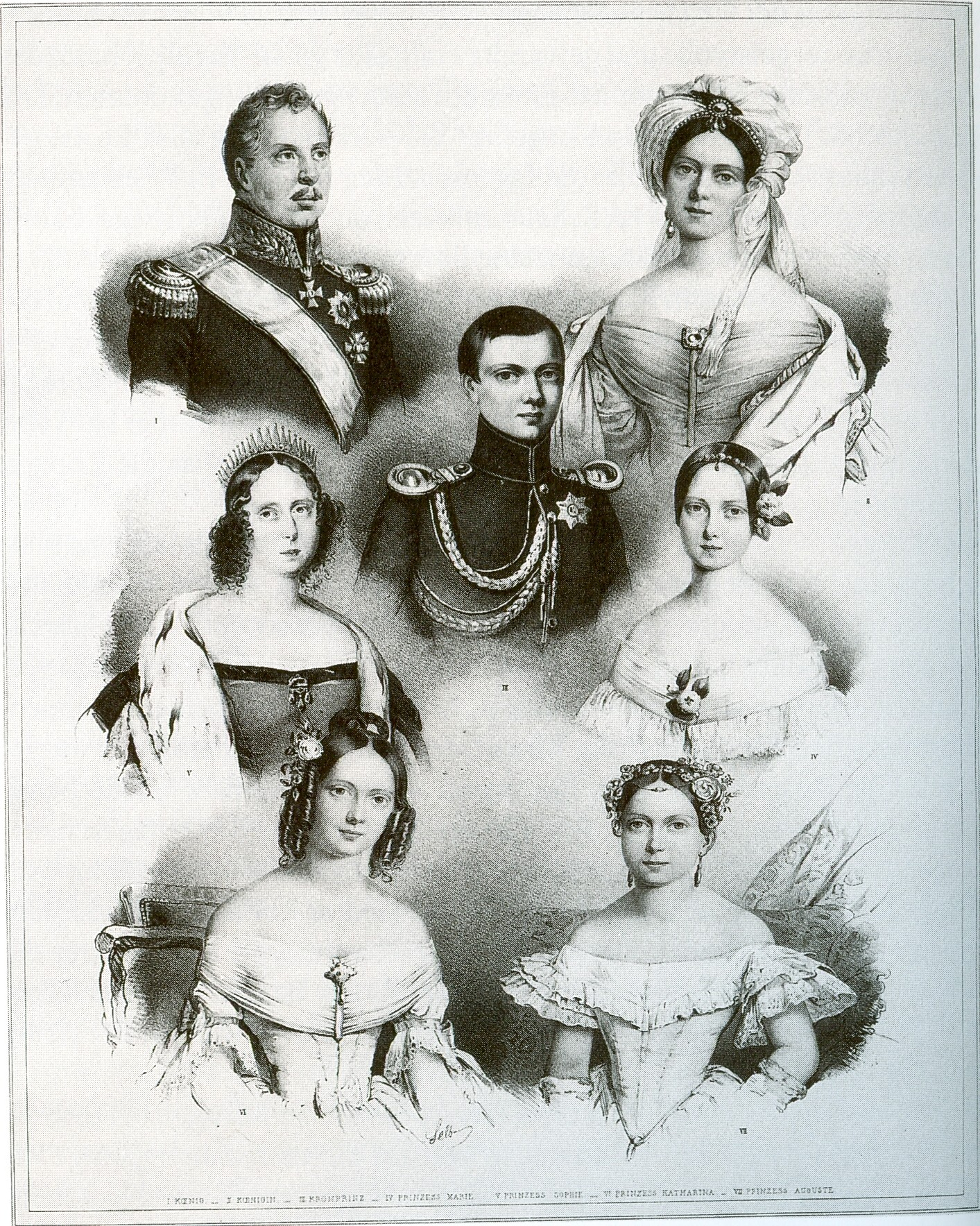
King William I and his third wife Queen Pauline (above), with their children Crown Prince Charles (centre), Catherine (bottom left) and Augusta (bottom right) and the king's two daughters from his second marriage Princesses Sophie (centre left) and Marie (centre right)

He married thrice:

- Firstly on 8 June 1808 in Munich to Caroline Augusta (1792–1873), daughter of King Maximilian I Joseph of Bavaria (1756–1825) and Princess Augusta Wilhelmine of Hesse-Darmstadt (1765–1796). They divorced in 1814, without issue;
- Secondly on 24 January 1816 in Saint Petersburg, Russia, he married his first cousin Grand Duchess Catherine Pavlovna of Russia (1788–1819), daughter of Emperor Paul I of Russia (1754–1801) and Princess Sophie Dorothea of Württemberg (1759–1828) by whom he had two daughters:
  - Princess Marie Friederike Charlotte of Württemberg (1816–1887) who married Alfred, Count von Neipperg (1807–1865);
  - Princess Sophie of Württemberg (1818–1877) who married King William III of the Netherlands (1817–1890).
- Thirdly on 15 April 1820 in Stuttgart he married another first cousin, Duchess Pauline Therese of Württemberg (1800–1873), a daughter of Duke Louis of Württemberg (1756–1817) and Princess Henrietta of Nassau-Weilburg (1780–1857), by whom he had one son and heir and two further daughters:
  - Princess Catherine of Württemberg (1821–1898) who married Prince Frederick of Württemberg (1808–1870) by whom she was the mother of King William II of Württemberg (born 1848–1921) the last King of Württemberg who succeeded his uncle King Charles I of Württemberg and ruled from 1891 until the abolition of the kingdom in 1918.
  - King Charles I of Württemberg (born 1823–1891), who succeeded his father as king of Württemberg. A homosexual, he married Grand Duchess Olga Nikolaevna of Russia, the daughter of Tsar Nicholas I of Russia, and leaving no issue was succeeded by his nephew King William II of Württemberg (born 1848–1921);
  - Princess Augusta of Württemberg (1826–1898) who married Prince Hermann of Saxe-Weimar-Eisenach (1825–1901). One of her daughters, Pauline of Saxe-Weimar-Eisenach, married Charles Augustus, Hereditary Grand Duke of Saxe-Weimar-Eisenach.

== Memorials ==
=== 1st Cannstatter Volksfest 1818–2018 ===
On 28 September 1818, one day after the king's 36th birthday, a big agricultural festival with horse races and prize-giving for outstanding cattle-breeding achievements was celebrated on the so-called Cannstatter Wasen site. Named the "Landwirtschaftliche Fest zu Kannstadt" (Kannstadt Agricultural Festival), it was therefore the 1st Cannstatter Volksfest. 200 years later Cannstatter Volksfest and the 100th Landwirtschaftliches Hauptfest are celebrated with a historical Volksfest on Stuttgart's Schlossplatz square. Cannstatter Volksfest and the 100th Landwirtschaftliches Hauptfest (an agricultural show)—the founding of the biggest festival in "Ländle", as the state of Baden-Württemberg is affectionately known, by King William I and his wife Katharina will be remembered in the heart of Stuttgart on the Schlossplatz square from 26 September to 3 October 2018. At the Historical Volksfest 2018 with King William I and his wife Katharina (actors) will be dressed in historical costumes dating back to 1818.

=== Sequoiadendron giganteum ===
In order to cultivate them for their wood, the King had some 5,000 Giant Sequoia (Sequoiadendron giganteum) grown from seed in 1865. He had the seeds sent from California. Today, after 160–161 years, the remaining examples have reached a height of over 30 metres (100 ft). Their older Californian relatives, with a height of 80 metres (260 ft) and a trunk circumference of more than 30 metres (100 ft), are the largest living organisms on our planet. Of the original 5,000 trees, 123 of the Giant Sequoia remain as memorials of King William.

== Honours ==
- Württemberg:
  - Knight of the Golden Eagle
  - Grand Cross of the Military Merit Order, 1800
  - Founder of the Friedrich Order, 1 January 1830
- Austrian Empire:
  - Commander of the Military Order of Maria Theresa, 1814
  - Grand Cross of St. Stephen, 1830
- Baden: Grand Cross of the House Order of Fidelity, 1813
- Kingdom of Bavaria: Knight of St. Hubert, 1808
- Belgium: Grand Cordon of the Royal Order of Leopold
- Brunswick: Grand Cross of Henry the Lion
- Denmark: Knight of the Elephant, 1 February 1817
- French Empire: Grand Eagle of the Legion of Honour, 1805/06
- Kingdom of Hanover:
  - Knight of St. George, 1852
  - Grand Cross of the Royal Guelphic Order
- Grand Duchy of Hesse: Grand Cross of the Ludwig Order, 2 September 1815
- Netherlands: Grand Cross of the Military William Order, 27 August 1815
- Oldenburg: Grand Cross of the Order of Duke Peter Friedrich Ludwig, with Golden Crown, 13 September 1847
- Kingdom of Prussia:
  - Knight of the Black Eagle, 3 November 1812
  - Iron Cross, 2nd Class, 1813
- Russian Empire:
  - Knight of St. Andrew, 3 May 1814
  - Knight of St. Alexander Nevsky, 3 May 1814
  - Knight of St. George, 2nd Class, 19 May 1814
- Saxe-Weimar-Eisenach: Grand Cross of the White Falcon, 16 February 1829
- Kingdom of Saxony: Knight of the Rue Crown, 1834
- United Kingdom:
  - Honorary Grand Cross of the Bath (military), 18 August 1815
  - Stranger Knight of the Garter, 26 July 1830

== Ancestry ==
Ancestors of William I of Württemberg

8. Charles Alexander, Duke of Württemberg
4. Frederick II Eugene, Duke of Württemberg
9. Princess Marie Auguste of Thurn and Taxis
2. Frederick I of Württemberg
10. Frederick William, Margrave of Brandenburg-Schwedt
5. Princess Friederike of Brandenburg-Schwedt
11. Princess Sophia Dorothea of Prussia
1. William I of Württemberg
12. Charles I, Duke of Brunswick-Wolfenbüttel
6. Charles William Ferdinand, Duke of Brunswick
13. Princess Philippine Charlotte of Prussia
3. Duchess Augusta of Brunswick-Wolfenbüttel
14. Frederick Lewis, Prince of Wales
7. Princess Augusta of Great Britain
15. Princess Augusta of Saxe-Gotha-Altenburg

== Notes ==
William I of Württemberg House of Württemberg Born: 27 September 1781 Died: 25 June 1864
Regnal titles
Preceded by Frederick I	King of Württemberg; 1816–1864	Succeeded by Charles I
