= Princess Catherine of Württemberg =

Princess Katharina
- Princess Frederick of Württemberg
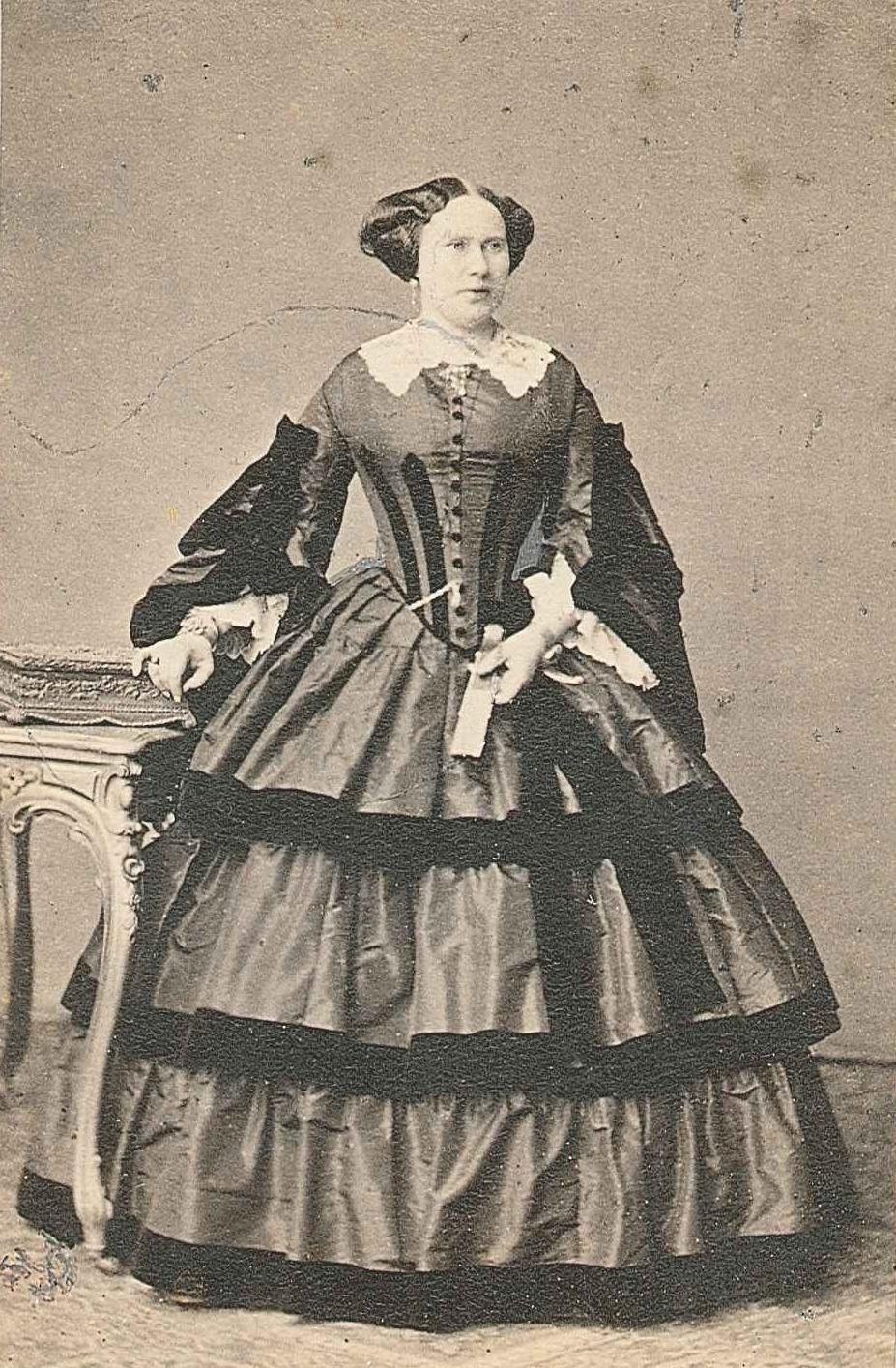
- Born: 24 August 1821; Stuttgart, Württemberg
- Died: 6 December 1898 (aged 77); Stuttgart, Württemberg
- Spouse: Prince Frederick of Württemberg (m. 1845; died 1870)
- Issue: William II of Württemberg
Names
- English: Catherine Frederica Charlotte; German: Katherina Friederike Charlotte
- House: Württemberg
- Father: William I of Württemberg
- Mother: Pauline Therese of Württemberg

Princess Katharina Friderikke Charlotte of Württemberg (Stuttgart, 24 August 1821 – Stuttgart, 6 December 1898) was a daughter of William I of Württemberg and Pauline Therese of Württemberg. She was the mother of William II of Württemberg.

== Family ==
Katharina was the eldest of three children born to William I of Württemberg by his third wife and cousin Pauline Therese of Württemberg. Her two siblings were Charles I of Württemberg and Augusta, Princess of Saxe-Weimar-Eisenach. She also had two half-siblings from her father's previous marriage to Catherine Pavlovna of Russia: Marie and Sophie, the future Queen consort of the Netherlands.

== Marriage ==
On 20 November 1845, Catherine married her first cousin, Prince Frederick of Württemberg. He was a son of Prince Paul of Württemberg and Princess Charlotte of Saxe-Hildburghausen. The marriage was meant to strengthen ties between the main branch of the Württemberg family and the next possible heir to the throne. As the marriage seemingly predicted, they had one son, who would eventually succeed her childless brother Charles as King of Württemberg:

- William II of Württemberg (25 February 1848 – 2 October 1921)

== Later life ==
Frederick died in 1870. In the 1880s, Catherine was described as a "portly, austere old widowed Princess...who had a red, mannish face, and habitually dressed in purple and mauve". She frequently resided in the Villa Seefeld, which was located in Switzerland. In this location, she was a neighbor of her relatives, the Tecks, who included the future Queen Mary of the United Kingdom. Catherine died 28 years after her husband, on 6 December 1898 in Stuttgart, the place of her birth.
