= Order of the Gold Lion of the House of Nassau =

Chivalric order in Luxembourg and Netherlands

Order of the Gold Lion of the House of Nassau Ordre du Lion d'Or de la Maison de Nassau Huisorde van de Gouden Leeuw van Nassau
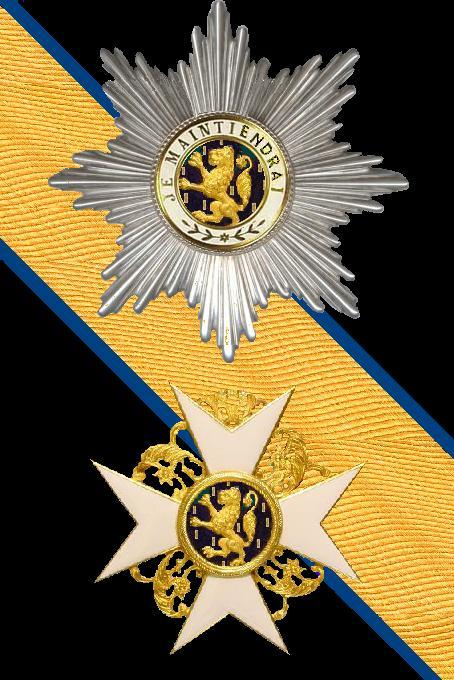
- Plaque, badge and ribbon of the order

Awarded by Grand Duke of Luxembourg King of the Netherlands
- Type: Luxembourg: National Order; Netherlands: House Order
- Established: 31 March 1858
- Ribbon: Orange moiré edged in blue
- Motto: Je maintiendrai ("I will maintain")
- Awarded for: Luxembourg: sovereigns, princes of sovereign houses and heads of state for meritorious service to the Grand Duke and country Netherlands: for people who have rendered special service to the Royal House
- Status: Currently constituted
- Grand Masters: Grand Duke Guillaume V of Luxembourg; King Willem-Alexander of the Netherlands
- Chancellor: Henri Ahlborn
- Grades: Knight
- Former grades: Grand Cross, Grand Officer, Commander, Officer

Statistics
- Last induction: Stephanie, Grand Duchess of Luxembourg (2025)

Precedence
- Next (higher): Luxembourg: None (highest); Netherlands: Order of Orange-Nassau
- Next (lower): Luxembourg: Order of Adolphe of Nassau; Netherlands: Order of the House of Orange
- Ribbon bar of the order

The Order of the Gold Lion of the House of Nassau (French: Ordre du Lion d'Or de la Maison de Nassau, Dutch: Huisorde van de Gouden Leeuw van Nassau; Luxembourgish: Nassaueschen Hausuerde vum Gëllene Léiw) is a chivalric order shared by the two branches of the House of Nassau (the Ottonian and Walramian lines).

In the context of the elder Walramian line, this order is the highest Luxembourgian national order and is bestowed by the Grand Duke of Luxembourg. It may be awarded to sovereigns, princes of sovereign houses and heads of state for meritorious service to Luxembourg and the Grand Duke.

In the context of the younger Ottonian line, this order is a house order (dynastic order) of the Dutch Royal House of Orange-Nassau and is awarded as a personal gift by the King of the Netherlands. In this case, the honour is conferred on a person who has rendered special service to the Royal House.

== History ==
=== 1858–1892 ===
The order was founded with royal grand-ducal decree on 31 March 1858 by King-Grand Duke William III. The sovereignty of the order was to be shared between both branches of the House of Nassau, by virtue of an agreement between William III, King of the Netherlands and Grand Duke of Luxembourg (Luxembourg was a part of the German Confederation until 1866), and Adolphe, Duke of Nassau and future Grand Duke of Luxembourg. The order originally included only one grade (i.e. Knight), but was increased to four by William III in 1873:

1. Grand Cross
2. Grand Officer
3. Officer
4. Knight

The further rank of Commander (in between Grand Officer and Officer) was introduced in 1882.

None of the changes made by William III were confirmed by Adolphe, with whom the order was supposed to be shared, and Adolphe refused to award any of the new grades. When William III died without a male heir, the grand duchy of Luxembourg passed to Adolphe, as dictated by the Nassau Family Pact.

=== 1892–present ===
Two years later, in 1892, Adolphe abolished the grades that William III had created unilaterally and, to this day, the order has maintained just one grade, i.e. that of Knight. In 1905, Adolphe agreed with Queen Wilhelmina of the Netherlands to once again share sovereignty of the order between both ruling branches of the House of Nassau.

At the present time, King Willem-Alexander of the Netherlands and Grand Duke Guillaume V of Luxembourg are joint Grand Masters of the Order of the Gold Lion of Nassau.

The order is conferred only on rare occasions in the Netherlands or Luxembourg. For example, the former Dutch Foreign Secretaries Max van der Stoel and Pieter Kooijmans were made knights of this order by the Queen of the Netherlands. In 1999, the two Grand Masters made the South African President Nelson Mandela a knight during his state visit to the Netherlands (see Nelson Mandela awards).

== Insignia ==
A knight wears the order's badge on a sash on the right shoulder, and the plaque (breast star) of the order on the left chest.

- The badge of the order is a white-enamelled golden Maltese Cross, with the golden monogram "N" between the arms of the cross. The obverse central disc is in blue enamel, bearing the Gold Lion of the House of Nassau. The reverse central disc is also blue enamelled, with the motto Je maintiendrai ("I will maintain") in gold.
- The plaque is an 8-pointed star with straight silver rays; the same obverse of the badge of the order appears at its centre, surrounded by the motto Je maintiendrai in gold letters on white enamel.
- The ribbon of the sash of the order is yellow-orange moiré with a small blue stripe at each edge.

== Award criteria ==
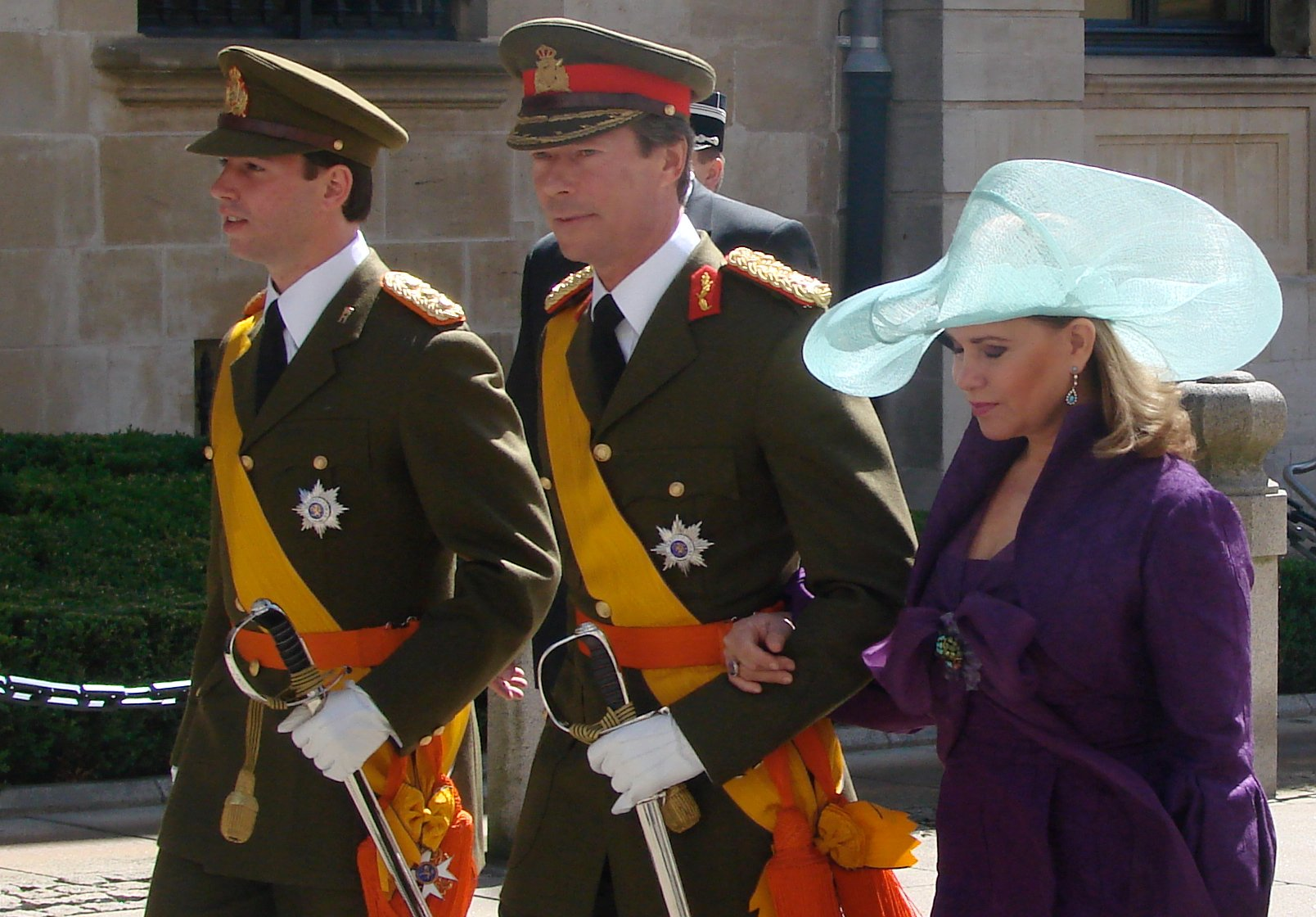
The then Hereditary Grand Duke of Luxembourg and The Grand Duke both wearing the insignia of the order. They are accompanied by Grand Duchess Maria Teresa of Luxembourg.

"Honorary distinctions of the Grand Duchy of Luxembourg":

The Order of the Gold Lion of the House of Nassau can be conferred on sovereigns and on princes of sovereign houses and, nowadays, also on heads of state, for meritorious service to the Grand Duke and country. The bestowal of the insignia is carried out by the Grand Duke or his specially appointed official representative. The brevet is awarded in agreement with the head of the Ottonian branch of the House of Nassau (The Netherlands).

=== Princes and Princesses of the House of Nassau ===
Princes who are sons or brothers of the heads of the two lines of the House of Nassau are born knights of the order. In 1984, Queen Beatrix and Grand Duke Jean made an agreement that princesses (daughters of the heads of the two lines of the House of Nassau) may be admitted when they reach the age of majority (18).

On 16 February 2009, Princess Alexandra of Luxembourg received the order on her 18th birthday. Now that King Willem-Alexander of the Netherlands is the head of the Dutch branch, his daughters are entitled to receive the order on their 18th birthdays. His eldest daughter, Catharina-Amalia, Princess of Orange received the order upon her 18th birthday on 7 December 2021. Followed by his middle daughter Princess Alexia of the Netherlands on her 18th birthday on 26 June 2023. Followed by his youngest daughter Princess Ariane of the Netherlands on her 18th birthday on 10 April 2025.

== Recipients ==
Grand Masters

- Guillaume V, Grand Duke of Luxembourg (Current)
- Willem-Alexander of the Netherlands (Current)
- William III of the Netherlands (Founder)

Grand Crosses

- Charles Augustus, Hereditary Grand Duke of Saxe-Weimar-Eisenach (1844–1894)
- Frederick Francis II, Grand Duke of Mecklenburg-Schwerin
- Walthère Frère-Orban

Knights

- Akihito
- Albert I of Belgium
- Albert II of Belgium
- Albert of Saxony
- Archduke Albrecht, Duke of Teschen
- Alexander II of Russia
- Alexander of Battenberg
- Alexander Stubb
- Princess Alexia of the Netherlands
- Princess Ariane of the Netherlands
- Prince Alexander of Hesse and by Rhine
- Princess Alexandra of Luxembourg
- Alfred, Duke of Saxe-Coburg and Gotha
- Prince Arnulf of Bavaria
- Prince August, Duke of Dalarna
- Prince August of Württemberg
- Baudouin of Belgium
- Rob Bauer
- Prince Bernhard of Lippe-Biesterfeld
- Prince Bernhard of Saxe-Weimar-Eisenach (1792–1862)
- Bhumibol Adulyadej
- Birendra of Nepal
- Carl XVI Gustaf
- Prince Carl, Duke of Västergötland
- Carol I of Romania
- Aníbal Cavaco Silva
- Charles XV
- Prince Charles, Count of Flanders
- Prince Charles of Luxembourg (born 2020)
- Charlotte, Grand Duchess of Luxembourg
- Christian IX of Denmark
- Prince Constantijn of the Netherlands
- Constantine II of Greece
- Princess Désirée, Baroness Silfverschiöld
- Edward VII
- Elisabeth of Bavaria, Queen of Belgium
- Elizabeth II of Great Britain
- Prince Ernest Augustus, 3rd Duke of Cumberland and Teviotdale
- Ernst I, Duke of Saxe-Altenburg
- Prince Eugen, Duke of Närke
- Prince Felix of Bourbon-Parma
- Prince Félix of Luxembourg
- Heinz Fischer
- Franz Joseph I of Austria
- Frederick VIII of Denmark
- Frederick I, Duke of Anhalt
- Frederick I, Grand Duke of Baden
- Frederick III, German Emperor
- Prince Frederick of Württemberg
- Frederick William IV of Prussia
- Frederick William, Grand Duke of Mecklenburg-Strelitz
- Archduke Friedrich, Duke of Teschen
- Prince Friso of Orange-Nassau
- Prince George, Duke of Cambridge
- George, King of Saxony
- George Victor, Prince of Waldeck and Pyrmont
- Prince Guillaume of Luxembourg
- Abdullah Gül
- Haile Selassie
- Tarja Halonen
- Harald V of Norway
- Henri, Grand Duke of Luxembourg
- Henrik, Prince Consort of Denmark
- Duke Henry of Mecklenburg-Schwerin
- Prince Hermann of Saxe-Weimar-Eisenach (1825–1901)
- Prince Jean of Luxembourg
- Jean, Grand Duke of Luxembourg
- Prince Johann of Schleswig-Holstein-Sonderburg-Glücksburg
- John of Saxony
- Archduke Joseph Karl of Austria
- Princess Joséphine Charlotte of Belgium
- Juliana of the Netherlands
- Archduke Karl Ferdinand of Austria
- Archduke Karl Ludwig of Austria
- Konstantin of Hohenlohe-Schillingsfürst
- Pieter Kooijmans
- Leopold III of Belgium
- Leopold IV, Duke of Anhalt
- Leopold III, Prince of Lippe
- Prince Leopold of Bavaria
- Walter von Loë
- Émile Loubet
- Louis III, Grand Duke of Hesse
- Louis IV, Grand Duke of Hesse
- Prince Louis of Luxembourg
- Archduke Ludwig Viktor of Austria
- Margrethe II of Denmark
- Maria Teresa, Grand Duchess of Luxembourg
- Infanta Marie Anne of Portugal
- Queen Máxima of the Netherlands
- Grand Duke Michael Nikolaevich of Russia
- Empress Michiko
- Napoleon III
- Prince Nikolaus Wilhelm of Nassau
- Olav V of Norway
- Oscar I of Sweden
- Oscar II
- Otto von Habsburg
- Queen Paola of Belgium
- Duke Peter of Oldenburg
- Prince Philip, Duke of Edinburgh
- Philippe of Belgium
- Prince Philippe, Count of Flanders
- Prince Frederick William of Hesse-Kassel
- Archduke Rainer Ferdinand of Austria
- Rainier III, Prince of Monaco
- Marcelo Rebelo de Sousa
- Sergio Mattarella
- Jan Jacob Rochussen
- Rudolf, Crown Prince of Austria
- Rupprecht, Crown Prince of Bavaria
- Prince William of Schaumburg-Lippe
- Walter Scheel
- Rudolf Schuster
- Prince Sébastien of Luxembourg
- Queen Letizia of Spain
- Queen Silvia of Sweden
- Stephanie, Grand Duchess of Luxembourg
- Queen Sofía of Spain
- Queen Sonja of Norway
- Catharina-Amalia, Princess of Orange
- Konstantinos Stephanopoulos
- Archduke Stephen of Austria (Palatine of Hungary)
- Max van der Stoel
- Princess Tenagnework
- Josip Broz Tito
- Prince Valdemar of Denmark
- Karl von Wedel
- Wilhelmina of the Netherlands
- William I, German Emperor
- William II of Württemberg
- William IV, Grand Duke of Luxembourg
- Prince William of Baden (1829–1897)
- William, Duke of Brunswick
- William, Prince of Wied
- Zog I of Albania
