= Prince Paul of Württemberg =

German prince (1785–1852)

Prince Paul
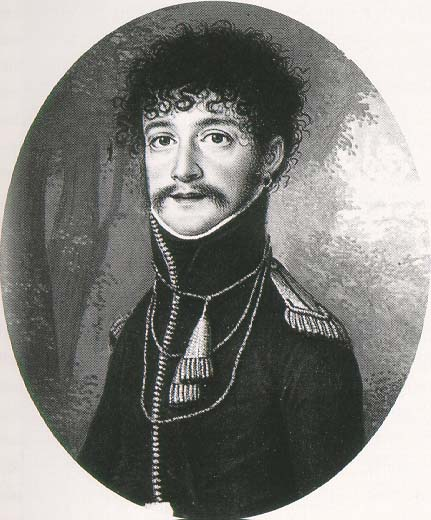
- Portrait, c. 1820
- Born: 19 January 1785; St Petersburg, Russian Empire
- Died: 16 April 1852 (aged 67); Paris, France
- Burial: Schlosskirche, Ludwigsburg
- Spouse: Princess Charlotte of Saxe-Hildburghausen (m. 1805; died 1847) Magdalena de Creus y Ximenes (m. 1848)
- Issue Detail: Charlotte, Grand Duchess Elena Pavlovna of Russia; Prince Frederick; Prince Karl; Pauline, Duchess of Nassau; Prince August
Names
- Paul Heinrich Karl Friedrich August
- House: Württemberg
- Father: Frederick I of Württemberg
- Mother: Augusta of Brunswick-Wolfenbüttel

Prince Paul of Württemberg (Paul Heinrich Karl Friedrich August; 19 January 1785 – 16 April 1852) was the fourth child and second son of King Frederick I and his wife, Duchess Augusta of Brunswick-Wolfenbüttel.

== Early life ==
Paul was born in St. Petersburg during a period when his father, not yet the ruler of Württemberg, was made governor of Old Finland by Catherine the Great in Russia. The couple had traveled to Russia to visit Frederick's sister Sophie, who was married to the heir to the Russian throne, the Tsesarevich Paul. Prince Paul's parents separated shortly after his birth. The marriage was unhappy, and there were allegations of abusive treatment of his mother. His mother was granted asylum by Catherine the Great and never returned to Württemberg. She died in exile in Koluvere, Estonia, in 1788. In 1797, Frederick married Charlotte, Princess Royal, eldest daughter of King George III of the United Kingdom, who supervised the education of Paul and his two surviving siblings, Wilhelm and Catharina. Charlotte regarded Paul as "a very comical boy and, in my partial eyes, his manners are like Adolphus [Charlotte's younger brother]."

As Paul grew up, her opinion changed. During the visit of the Allied sovereigns to London in 1814, Paul, along with many other princes, was taken to visit the Ascot races by the Prince Regent. He behaved badly and got the Prince of Orange blind drunk. "For thirteen years he has done nothing but offend his father with the improprieties of his conduct", his stepmother wrote.

== First marriage and children ==
On 28 September 1805 in Ludwigsburg, Paul married Princess Charlotte of Saxe-Hildburghausen, second daughter of Frederick, Duke of Saxe-Hildburghausen, who became Duke of Saxe-Altenburg in 1826. They had five children:

- Princess Friederike Charlotte Marie (9 January 1807 – 2 February 1873); married Grand Duke Michael Pavlovich of Russia
- Prince Frederick Karl August (21 February 1808 – 9 May 1870); married his cousin Princess Catherine Frederica of Württemberg and was the father of William II of Württemberg.
- Karl (7 March 1809 – 28 May 1810)
- Princess Pauline Friederike Marie (25 February 1810 – 7 July 1856); married William, Duke of Nassau; mother of Sophia of Nassau, wife of Oscar II of Sweden and Norway. Through Pauline, Paul is an ancestor of the present Belgian, Danish, Dutch, Norwegian, and Swedish royal families, and the Grand Ducal Family of Luxembourg.
- Prince August (24 January 1813 – 12 January 1885); married (morganatically) Marie Bethge, with issue.

=== Illegitimate descendants ===
Shortly before his marriage, Paul had a mistress, an actress named Friederike Margarethe Porth. Friederike was the daughter of Johann Carl Porth and his wife, Caroline. Paul and Friederike had a daughter baptized Adelheid Pauline Karoline, usually called Karoline, marrying later as Karoline von Rottenburg (16 November 1805, Frankfurt am Main - 13 February 1872, Frankfurt am Main). On 16 February 1836, in Augsburg, Karoline married Freiherr Karl Pfeffel von Kriegelstein (22 November 1811, Dresden - 25 January 1890, Munich). Through his daughter Karoline, Prince Paul is an ancestor of former British Prime Minister Boris Johnson (through Johnson’s father Stanley).

== Later life and second marriage ==
In 1815 Paul moved from his home in Stuttgart to Paris, leaving his wife and two sons, but taking his daughters with him. There he led a relatively modest life, but was frequently in the company of intellectuals such as Georges Cuvier. Paul's family did not approve of this and ordered him to return to Württemberg, but he refused. While in Paris, he fathered two more illegitimate daughters by two different mistresses.

Shortly after the death of his wife in 1847, Paul went to England with his long-term mistress Magdalena Fausta Angela Creus y Soler, of Menorcan origin, the widow of Sir Sandford Whittingham KCB, and they were married in the Parish Church of St Nicholas, Brighton, Sussex, on 26 April 1848. She died in Paris, 27 December 1852. They had a daughter, born before their marriage:

- Pauline Madeleine Ximenes (3 March 1825 – 24 February 1905), created Countess von Helfenstein in 1841. So far it has not been disclosed who had conferred upon her the aristocratic title of "von Helfenstein". She married Count Gustave de Monttessuy in Paris on 24 August 1843.

Paul died in Paris aged 67 on 16 April 1852.

== Honours ==
- Württemberg:
  - Grand Cross of the Württemberg Crown
  - Knight of the Military Merit Order
- French Empire: Grand Eagle of the Legion of Honour, 1805/06
- Kingdom of Bavaria: Knight of St. Hubert, 1808
- Kingdom of Prussia: Knight of the Black Eagle, 3 November 1812

== Ancestry ==
Ancestors of Prince Paul of Württemberg

8. Charles Alexander, Duke of Württemberg
4. Frederick II Eugene, Duke of Württemberg
9. Princess Marie Auguste of Thurn and Taxis
2. Frederick I of Württemberg
10. Frederick William, Margrave of Brandenburg-Schwedt
5. Princess Friederike of Brandenburg-Schwedt
11. Princess Sophia Dorothea of Prussia
1. Prince Paul of Württemberg
12. Charles I, Duke of Brunswick-Wolfenbüttel
6. Charles William Ferdinand, Duke of Brunswick
13. Princess Philippine Charlotte of Prussia
3. Duchess Augusta of Brunswick-Wolfenbüttel
14. Frederick Lewis, Prince of Wales
7. Princess Augusta of Great Britain
15. Princess Augusta of Saxe-Gotha-Altenburg
