= Princess Charlotte of Saxe-Hildburghausen =

German princess (1787–1847)

Princess Charlotte
- Princess Paul of Württemberg
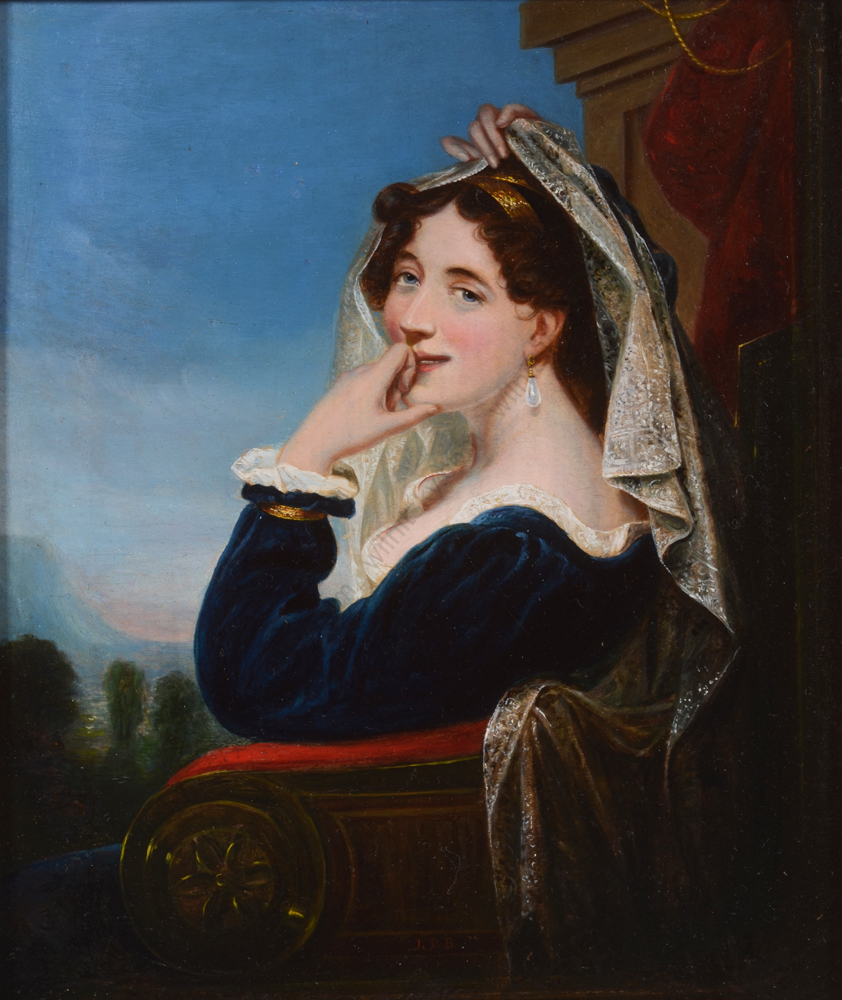
- Portrait c. 1815–1820
- Born: 17 June 1787; Hildburghausen, Saxe-Hildburghausen, Holy Roman Empire
- Died: 12 December 1847 (aged 60); Bamberg, Kingdom of Bavaria, German Confederation
- Spouse: Prince Paul of Württemberg (m. 1805)
- Issue: Charlotte, Grand Duchess of Russia; Prince Frederick Charles; Prince Paul Friedrich; Pauline, Duchess of Nassau; Prince Friedrich August
Names
- Katharina Charlotte Georgine Friederike Sophie Therese von Sachsen-Hildburghausen
- House: Saxe-Hildburghausen
- Father: Frederick, Duke of Saxe-Altenburg
- Mother: Duchess Charlotte Georgine of Mecklenburg-Strelitz

Princess Charlotte of Saxe-Hildburghausen (17 June 1787 – 12 December 1847) was the daughter of Frederick, Duke of Saxe-Altenburg and Duchess Charlotte Georgine of Mecklenburg-Strelitz. She was the wife of Prince Paul of Württemberg and mother to five of his children.

== Early life ==
Charlotte was the eldest daughter of Frederick, Duke of Saxe-Altenburg, and his wife Duchess Charlotte Georgine of Mecklenburg-Strelitz. She was the second of twelve children. One of her godparents was Catherine the Great of Russia.

Along with her sisters, Therese and Louise, Charlotte was considered quite a beauty. Poet Friedrich Rückert dedicated one of his works, Mit drei Moosrosen, to these three young ladies. The title roughly translates to "Three Moss Roses".

== Marriage and children ==
On 28 September 1805, she married Prince Paul of Wurttemberg in an extravagant wedding, but it was not a happy marriage. They had numerous arguments, and Paul was said to have many mistresses, with whom he had several affairs. They had five children:

- Princess Charlotte of Württemberg (1807–1873); married Grand Duke Michael Pavlovich of Russia, taking the name "Elena Pavlovna" upon her conversion to the Russian Orthodox Church.
- Prince Frederick of Württemberg (1808–1870); married his cousin, Princess Catherine Frederica of Württemberg.
- Prince Paul of Württemberg (1809–1810); died at an early age
- Princess Pauline of Württemberg (1810–1856); married Wilhelm, Duke of Nassau
- Prince August of Württemberg (1813–1885); married Marie Bethge

The couple separated soon after the birth of their fifth child. The idea of divorce was rejected by the King of Württemberg. Charlotte lived in a house called Sovereignty in Hildburghausen. Her eldest daughter, Princess Charlotte, visited her there quite often. Her brother, Frederick, was also a frequent visitor.

Charlotte died at the Royal Palace in Bamberg and is buried in the crypt of the House of Württemberg in Ludwigsburg.

Soon after Charlotte's death, Paul remarried. Charlotte was the maternal grandmother of Sofia of Nassau, who became the Queen Consort of Sweden (1872–1907).

== Ancestry ==
Ancestors of Princess Charlotte of Saxe-Hildburghausen

16. Ernest Frederick I, Duke of Saxe-Hildburghausen
8. Ernst Frederick II, Duke of Saxe-Hildburghausen
17. Countess Sophia Albertine of Erbach-Erbach
4. Ernest Frederick III, Duke of Saxe-Hildburghausen
18. Philipp Karl, Count of Erbach-Fürstenau
9. Countess Caroline of Erbach-Fürstenau
19. Countess Charlotte Amalie of Kunowitz
2. Frederick, Duke of Saxe-Altenburg
20. Johann Ernst III, Duke of Saxe-Weimar
10. Ernest Augustus I, Duke of Saxe-Weimar-Eisenach
21. Princess Sophie Auguste of Anhalt-Zerbst
5. Princess Ernestine of Saxe-Weimar
22. George Frederick Charles, Margrave of Brandenburg-Bayreuth
11. Margravine Sophie Charlotte of Brandenburg-Bayreuth
23. Princess Dorothea of Schleswig-Holstein-Sonderburg-Beck
1. Princess Charlotte of Saxe-Hildburghausen
24. Adolf Frederick II, Duke of Mecklenburg-Strelitz
12. Duke Charles Louis Frederick of Mecklenburg
25. Princess Christiane Emilie of Schwarzburg-Sondershausen
6. Charles II, Grand Duke of Mecklenburg
26. Ernest Frederick I, Duke of Saxe-Hildburghausen (= 16)
13. Princess Elisabeth Albertine of Saxe-Hildburghausen
27. Countess Sophia Albertine of Erbach-Erbach (= 17)
3. Duchess Charlotte Georgine of Mecklenburg-Strelitz
28. Louis VIII, Landgrave of Hesse-Darmstadt
14. Prince George William of Hesse-Darmstadt
29. Countess Charlotte of Hanau-Lichtenberg
7. Princess Friederike of Hesse-Darmstadt
30. Count Christian Karl Reinhard of Leiningen-Dagsburg-Heidesheim
15. Countess Maria Louise Albertine of Leiningen-Falkenburg-Dagsburg
31. Countess Catharine Polyxene of Solms-Rödelheim and Assenheim
