= Order of St. George (Hanover) =

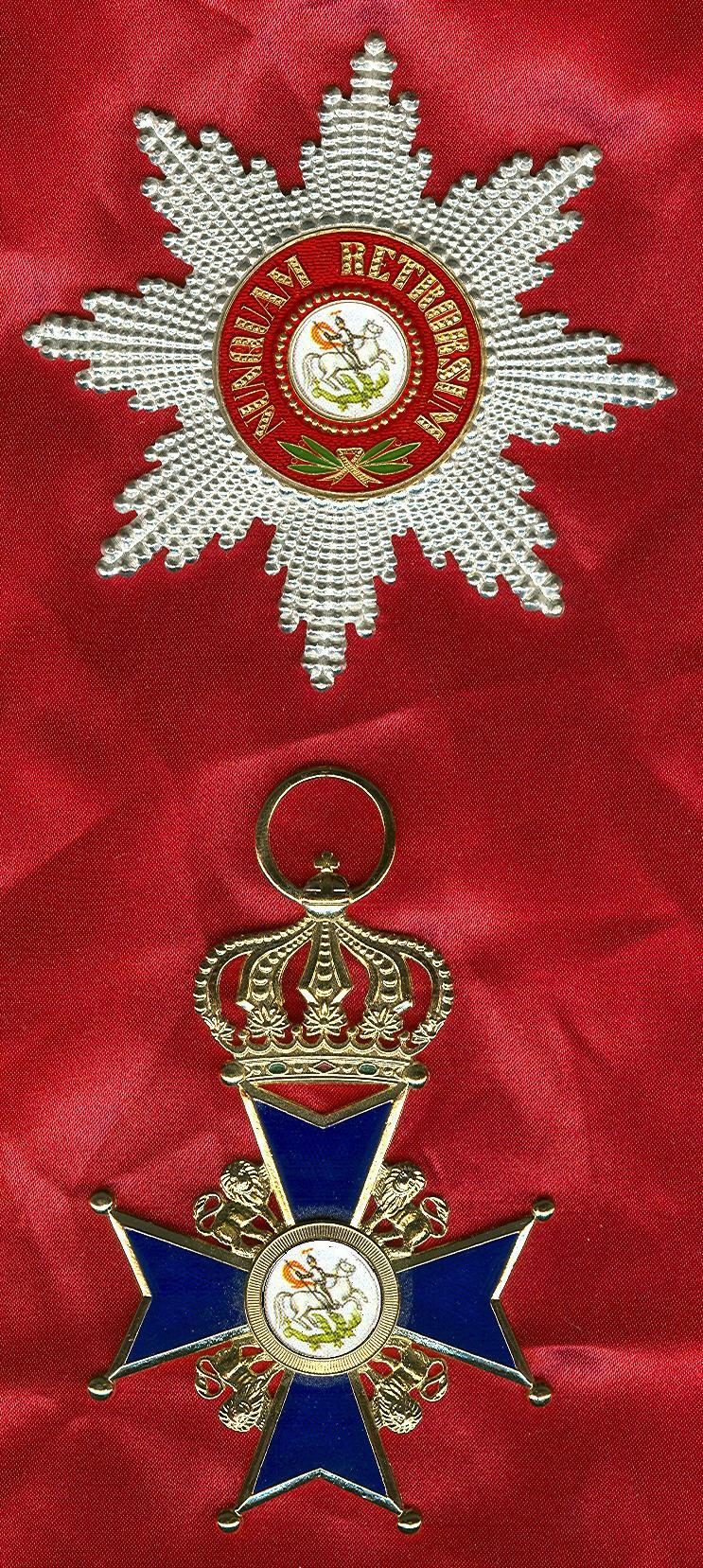
- Star and cross of the Order of St. George

Awarded by Kingdom of Hannover
- Type: House Order
- Motto: Nunquam retrorsum (Never Backward)
- Status: Currently awarded by the head of the House of Hanover
- Grand Master: Ernst August, Prince of Hanover

Precedence
- Next (higher): -
- Next (lower): Royal Guelphic Order
- Ribbon of the order

The Order of St. George (German: Sankt Georgs-Orden) was founded by Ernest Augustus, King of Hanover on 23 April 1839. In the statutes establishing the order it was designated as the House Order of the Crown of Hanover. The order is of a single grade and limited to 16 members, excluding members of the royal family.

== Insignia ==
The badge is an eight-pointed Maltese Cross, surmounted by a gold crown. The arms are covered in blue enamel with gold trim and balls on the tips of the cross. Between the arms are golden lions. A round medallion in the center and depicts St. George on horseback in a duel with a green dragon. The back has the cypher of the founder of the order EAR (Ernestus Augustus Rex).

The star of the order is of brilliant silver with eight arms. In the center is the scene of Saint George and the dragon he slew, surrounded by a red enamel ring with the Latin motto of the order "Nunquam retrorsum" in gold.

The ribbon of the order is dark crimson.

== Gallery ==
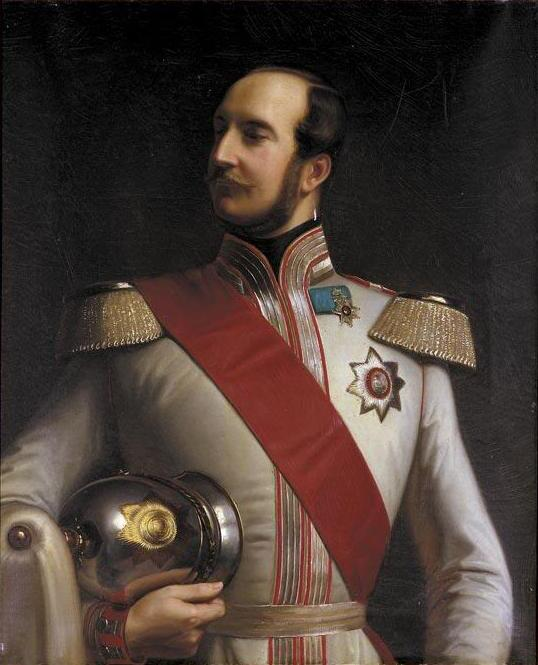
George V of Hannover wearing the insignia of the order

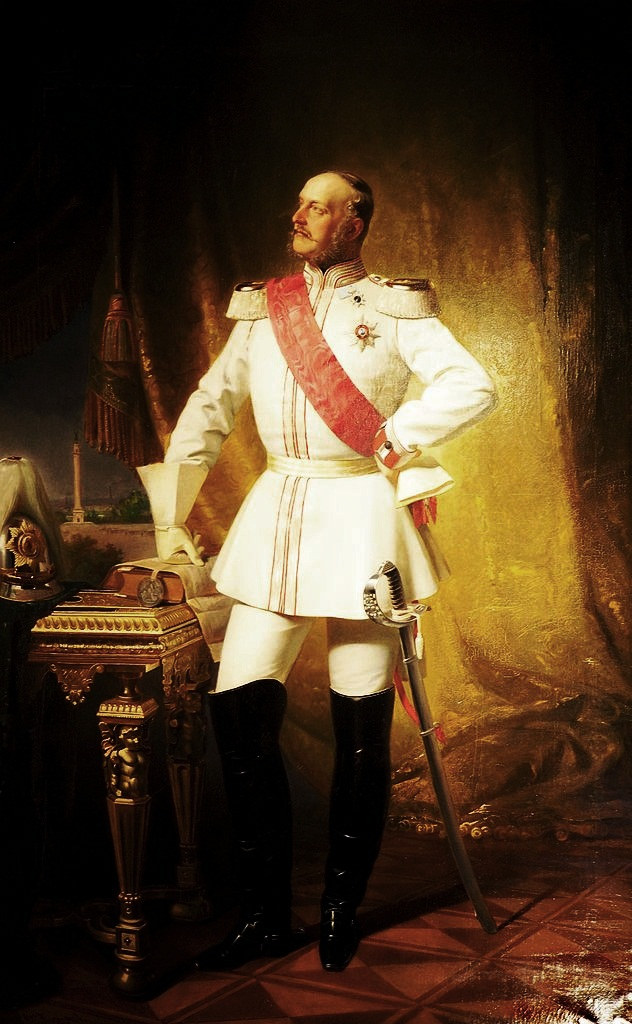
George V of Hannover wearing the insignia of the order
