= Henkel (surname) =

Henkel is a surname. Notable people with the surname include:

- Andrea Henkel (born 1977), German biathlete
- Caesar Carl Hans Henkel (1837–1913), German-born South African forester, cartographer, painter, soldier and botanist
- Christoph Henkel (born 1958), German billionaire businessman
- Claudia Henkel (born 1983), South African beauty queen and model
- Ernest Henkel (1873–1935), manager of the Metropolitan Opera
- Friedrich Karl Henkel (1848–1930), German entrepreneur and company founder
- Hans-Olaf Henkel (born 1940), German businessman and politician
- Heike Henkel (born 1964), German former athlete
- Heinrich Henkel (born 1896, date of death unknown), German First World War flying ace
- Henner Henkel (1915–1942), German tennis player
- Herbert L. Henkel, CEO of Ingersoll Rand
- Hugo Henkel (1881–1952), German businessman and former CEO of German company Henkel
- Joerg Henkel, German engineer
- John Spurgeon Henkel (1871–1962), South African botanist and forester
- Jost Henkel (1909–1961), German businessman
- Kim Henkel, American screenwriter, film director and producer
- Kim Henkel, creator of ZTreeWin
- Konrad Henkel (1915–1999), German businessman
- Manuela Henkel (born 1974), German cross-country skier
- Rainer Henkel (born 1964), former freestyle swimmer

== See also ==
- Henckel von Donnersmarck, a Silesian noble family
- Henckel-Rennen, a horse race in Germany
- J. A. Henckels, a knife manufacturer in Germany
- Henkle v. Gregory, a federal lawsuit that ended in a 2002 agreement
- Henkle, surname
