= List of hot springs in Colorado =

A map of the United States of America with the State of Colorado highlighted.

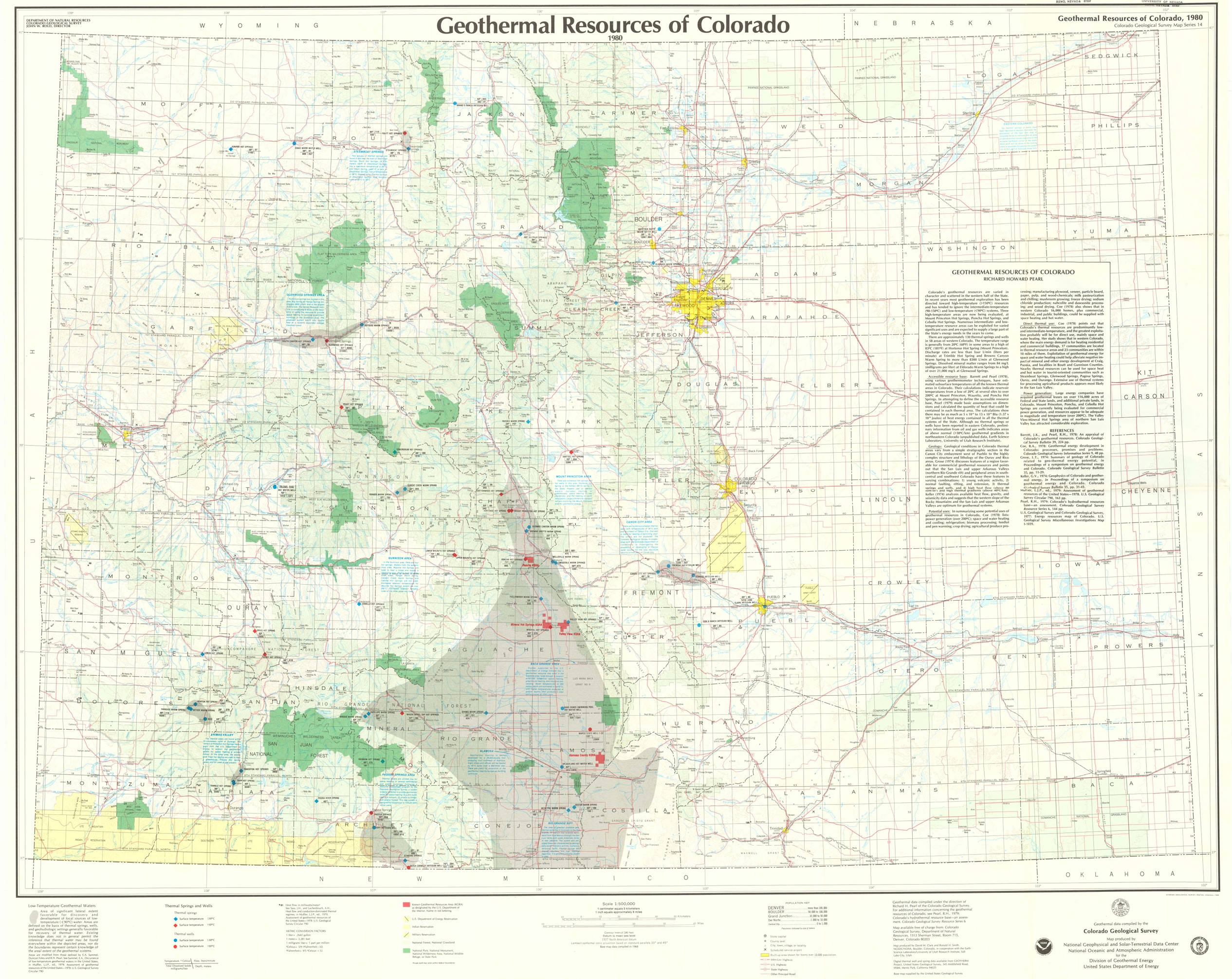
Geothermal resources of Colorado (1980)

This is a partial list of geothermal springs in the US State of Colorado. These springs range in volume from the hot springs around Glenwood Springs which keep the Colorado River from freezing for 50 miles (80 km) downstream to little springs with just a trickle of water. Water temperatures range from scalding to tepid. Accommodations around these springs range from elegant resorts to remote mountain sides. Many of these springs are on private property, so check before entering.

== Table ==
This is a sortable table of some of the geothermal springs in Colorado. Select the OpenStreetMap link in the box at right to view a map showing the location these springs.

Geothermal Springs in Colorado
Geothermal spring	Nearest town	County	Location	Elevation	Access
Antero Hot Springs	Nathrop	Chaffee	38.7316°N 106.1671°W	8,281 ft 2524 m	Antero Hot Springs (Note: This spring lies on private property and requires a fee for entry.)
Aqua Hot Spring	Nathrop	Chaffee	38.7240°N 106.1736°W	8,406 ft 2562 m	Aqua Hot Spring
Avalanche Ranch Hot Springs	Redstone	Pitkin	39.2478°N 107.2372°E	8,406 ft 2562 m	Avalanche Ranch
Birdsie Warm Spring	Spar City	Mineral	37.7281°N 107.0545°W	8,924 ft 2720 m	Colorado State Highway 149.
Box Canyon Hot Springs	Ouray	Ouray	38.0191°N 107.6744°W	7,799 ft 2377 m	Box Canyon Hot Springs
Browns Canyon Warm Spring	Browns Canyon National Monument	Chaffee	38.6531°N 106.0567°W	7,507 ft 2288 m	Browns Canyon National Monument (Note: This spring is located in a United States National Monument.)
Browns Grotto Warm Spring	Nathrop	Chaffee	38.6356°N 106.0744°W	7,484 ft 2281 m	Road from Hecla Junction.
Cañon City Hot Springs	Cañon City	Fremont	38.4331°N 105.2617°W	5,367 ft 1636 m	Riverside Avenue.
Cebolla Hot Springs	Powderhorn	Gunnison	38.2738°N 107.0987°W	8,094 ft 2467 m	Gunnison County Road 29.
Cement Creek Hot Spring	Crested Butte	Gunnison	38.8350°N 106.8267°W	9,268 ft 2825 m	Gunnison Forest Road 740.
Chattanooga Hot Spring	Silverton	San Juan	37.8729°N 107.7253°W	10,259 ft 3127 m	Hike up Mill Creek.
Conundrum Hot Springs	Aspen	Pitkin	39.0120°N 106.8910°W	11,207 ft 3416 m	8.5-mile (13.7 km) hike in White River National Forest. (Note: This spring lies on public property.)
Cottonwood Hot Springs	Buena Vista	Chaffee	38.8131°N 106.2245°W	8,593 ft 2619 m	Cottonwood Hot Springs
Desert Reef Hot Spring	Florence	Fremont	38.3715°N 105.0433°W	5,135 ft 1565 m	Desert Reef Hot Spring
Dotsero Warm Springs	Dotsero	Eagle	39.6275°N 107.1067°W	6,250 ft 1905 m	I-70 Frontage Road.
Dunton Hot Springs	Dunton Hot Springs	Dolores	37.7717°N 108.0928°W	8,921 ft 2719 m	Dunton Hot Springs
Durango Hot Springs	Trimble	La Plata	37.3917°N 107.8484°W	6,585 ft 2007 m	Durango Hot Springs Resort
Geyser Warm Spring	Dunton	Dolores	37.7469°N 108.1176°W	9,639 ft 2938 m	Hike up Geyser Creek.
Glenwood Hot Springs	Glenwood Springs	Garfield	39.5480°N 107.3226°W	5,751 ft 1753 m	Glenwood Hot Springs Resort
Hartsel Hot Springs	Hartsel	Park	39.0183°N 105.7950°W	8,865 ft 2702 m	Hike from Colorado State Highway 9.
Hot Springs	Wolf Creek Pass	Mineral	37.5092°N 106.9473°W	9,052 ft 2759 m	Remote area of San Juan National Forest.
Hot Sulphur Springs	Hot Sulphur Springs	Grand	40.0730°N 106.1136°W	7,726 ft 2355 m	Hot Sulphur Springs Resort
Hott Spring	Steamboat Springs	Routt	40.5593°N 106.8507°W	7,490 ft 2283 m	Routt County Road 36.
Hotz Spring	Pagosa Springs	Archuleta	37.3144°N 107.2000°W	7,884 ft 2403 m	Remote area of San Juan National Forest.
Indian Hot Springs	Idaho Springs	Clear Creek	39.7389°N 105.5125°W	7,638 ft 2328 m	Indian Hot Springs
Iron Mountain Hot Springs	Glenwood Springs	Eagle	39.5553°N 107.3362°W	5,735 ft 1748 m	Iron Mountain Hot Springs
Juniper Hot Springs	Maybell	Moffat	40.4669°N 107.9526°W	5,994 ft 1827 m	Juniper Hot Springs
Lemon Hot Spring	Placerville	San Miguel	38.0153°N 108.0537°W	7,323 ft 2232 m	Geyser Drive.
Mineral Hot Springs	Mineral Hot Springs	Saguache	38.1680°N 105.9245°W	7,746 ft 2361 m	Joyful Journey Hot Springs
Mount Princeton Hot Springs	Nathrop	Chaffee	38.7331°N 106.1625°W	8,182 ft 2494 m	Mount Princeton Hot Springs Resort
Orvis Hot Springs	Ridgway	Ouray	38.1333°N 107.7343°W	7,057 ft 2151 m	Orvis Hot Springs
Ouray Hot Springs	Ouray	Ouray	38.0211°N 107.6726°W	7,782 ft 2372 m	Portland Creek.
Ouray Hot Springs Pool	Ouray	Ouray	38.0288°N 107.6719°W	7,717 ft 2352 m	Ouray Hot Springs (Note: This spring is at a public facility that requires a fee for entry.)
Overlook Hot Springs	Pagosa Springs	Archuleta	37.2672°N 107.0107°W	7,106 ft 2166 m	Overlook Hot Springs
Pagosa hot springs	Pagosa Springs	Archuleta	37.2647°N 107.0109°W	7,064 ft 2153 m	Healing Waters
Pagosa Springs (Mother Spring)	Pagosa Springs	Archuleta	37.2631°N 107.0117°W	7,060 ft 2152 m	The Springs Resort
Paradise Warm Spring	Dunton	Dolores	37.7542°N 108.1320°W	8,556 ft 2608 m	Dolores County Road 38.
Penny Hot Springs	Redstone	Pitkin	39.2261°N 107.2256°W	6,929 ft 2112 m	Avalanche Ranch
Piedra River Hot Springs	Arboles	Archuleta	37.3119°N 107.3553°W	7,799 ft 2377 m	1.5-mile (2.4 km) hike in San Juan National Forest.
Pinkerton Hot Springs	Hermosa	La Plata	37.4472°N 107.8053°W	6,795 ft 2071 m	Academy Drive.
Poncha Hot Springs	Poncha Springs	Chaffee	38.4967°N 106.0778°W	7,995 ft 2437 m	Chaffee County Road 115.
Radium Hot Springs	Radium	Grand	39.9664°N 106.5456°W	6,791 ft 2070 m	Above Colorado River in the BLM Radium Wildlife Area.
Rainbow Hot Springs	Wolf Creek Pass	Mineral	37.5111°N 106.9456°W	9,593 ft 2924 m	7-mile (11 km) hike in San Juan National Forest.
Ranger Hot Spring	Crested Butte	Gunnison	38.8161°N 106.8751°W	8,645 ft 2635 m	Cement Creek Road.
Rhodes Warm Springs	Fairplay	Park	39.1636°N 106.0653°W	10,200 ft 3109 m	Warm Springs Road.
Salida Hot Springs	Salida	Chaffee	38.5250°N 106.0094°W	7,162 ft 2183 m	Salida Hot Springs Aquatic Center
Sand Dunes Pool	Hooper	Alamosa	37.7784°N 105.8561°W	7,539 ft 2298 m	Sand Dunes Pool
South Canyon Hot Springs	Glenwood Springs	Garfield	39.5519°N 107.4126°W	5,879 ft 1792 m	Short hike above Garfield County Road 134.
Splashland Hot Springs	Alamosa	Alamosa	37.4889°N 105.8579°W	7,543 ft 2299 m	Splashland Hot Springs
Steamboat Hot Springs	Steamboat Springs	Routt	40.4824°N 106.8278°W	6,726 ft 2050 m	Old Town Hot Springs
Stratten Warm Spring	Hermosa	La Plata	37.4064°N 107.8442°W	6,624 ft 2019 m	La Plata County Road 203.
Strawberry Park Hot Springs	Steamboat Springs	Routt	40.5595°N 106.8505°W	7,441 ft 2268 m	Strawberry Park Hot Springs
Swissvale Warm Springs	Wellsville	Fremont	38.4789°N 105.8917°W	6,824 ft 2080 m	Swissvale Road.
Trimble Hot Springs	Trimble	La Plata	37.3911°N 107.8484°W	6,581 ft 2006 m	La Plata County Road 203.
Tripp Hot Springs	Trimble	La Plata	37.4000°N 107.8495°W	6,837 ft 2084 m	Short hike from Sampson Oaks Road.
Twin Peaks Hot Springs	Ouray	Ouray	38.0192°N 107.6733°W	7,792 ft 2375 m	Twin Peaks Hot Springs
Valley View Hot Springs	Moffat	Saguache	38.1923°N 105.8137°W	8,642 ft 2634 m	Valley View Hot Springs
Wagon Wheel Gap Hot Springs	Creede	Mineral	37.7469°N 106.8317°W	8,504 ft 2592 m	Goose Creek Road.
Warm Spring	Delta	Mesa	38.7648°N 108.4255°W	6,598 ft 2011 m	Remote 4WD trail in Uncompahgre National Forest.
Warm Springs	Dinosaur National Monument	Moffat	40.5316°N 108.9287°W	5,148 ft 1569 m	Dinosaur National Monument.
Waunita Hot Springs	Doyleville	Gunnison	38.5139°N 106.5086°W	8,957 ft 2730 m	Waunita Hot Springs Ranch
Wellsville Warm Spring	Wellsville	Fremont	38.4878°N 105.9122°W	6,906 ft 2105 m	Fremont County Road 55.
Wiesbaden Hot Springs	Ouray	Ouray	38.0232°N 107.6680°W	7,858 ft 2395 m	Wiesbaden Hot Springs
Yampah Hot Springs	Glenwood Springs	Garfield	39.5507°N 107.3202°W	5,758 ft 1755 m	Yampah Hot Springs Vapor Caves

== Gallery ==
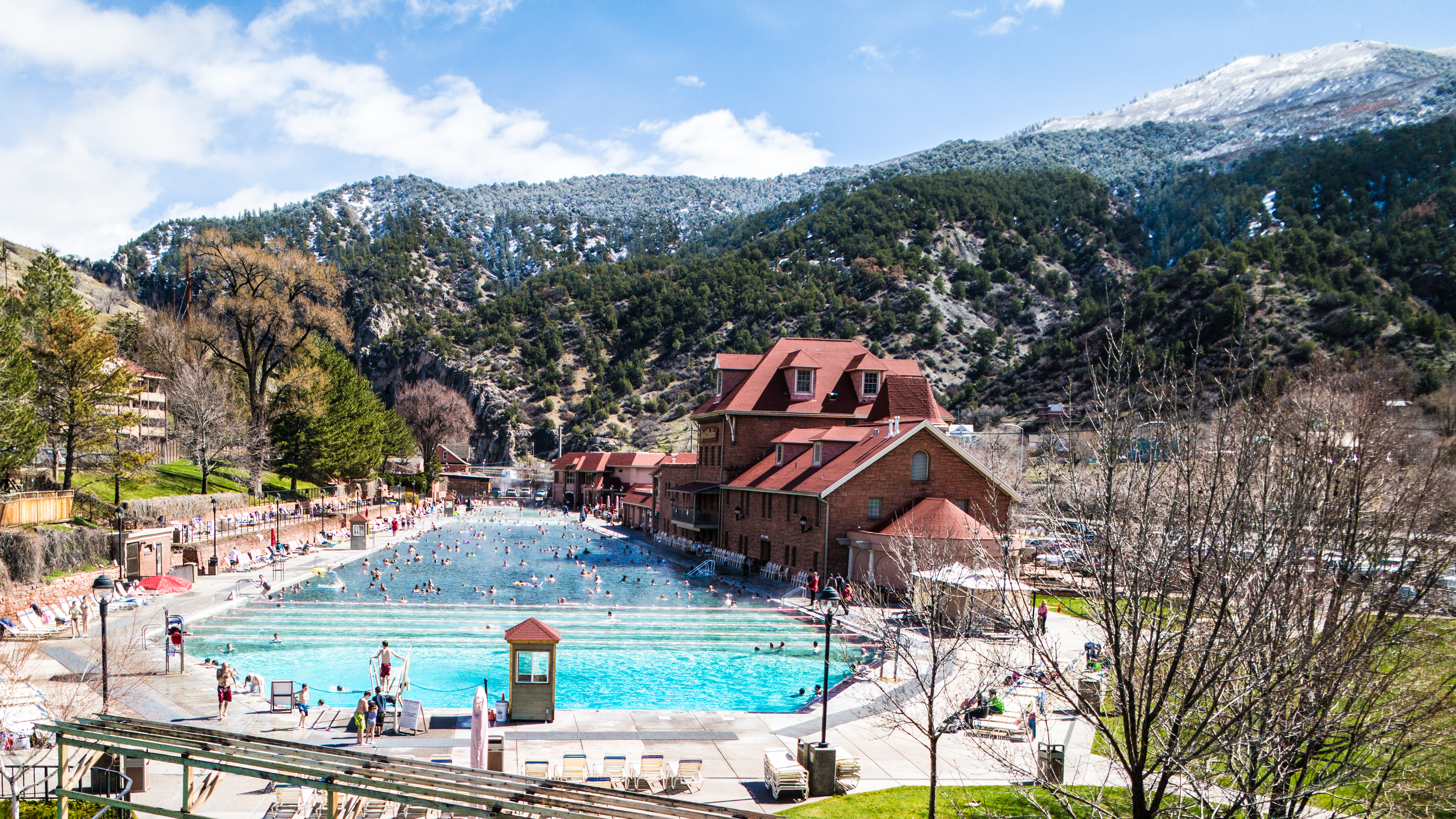
Glenwood Hot Springs Pool.

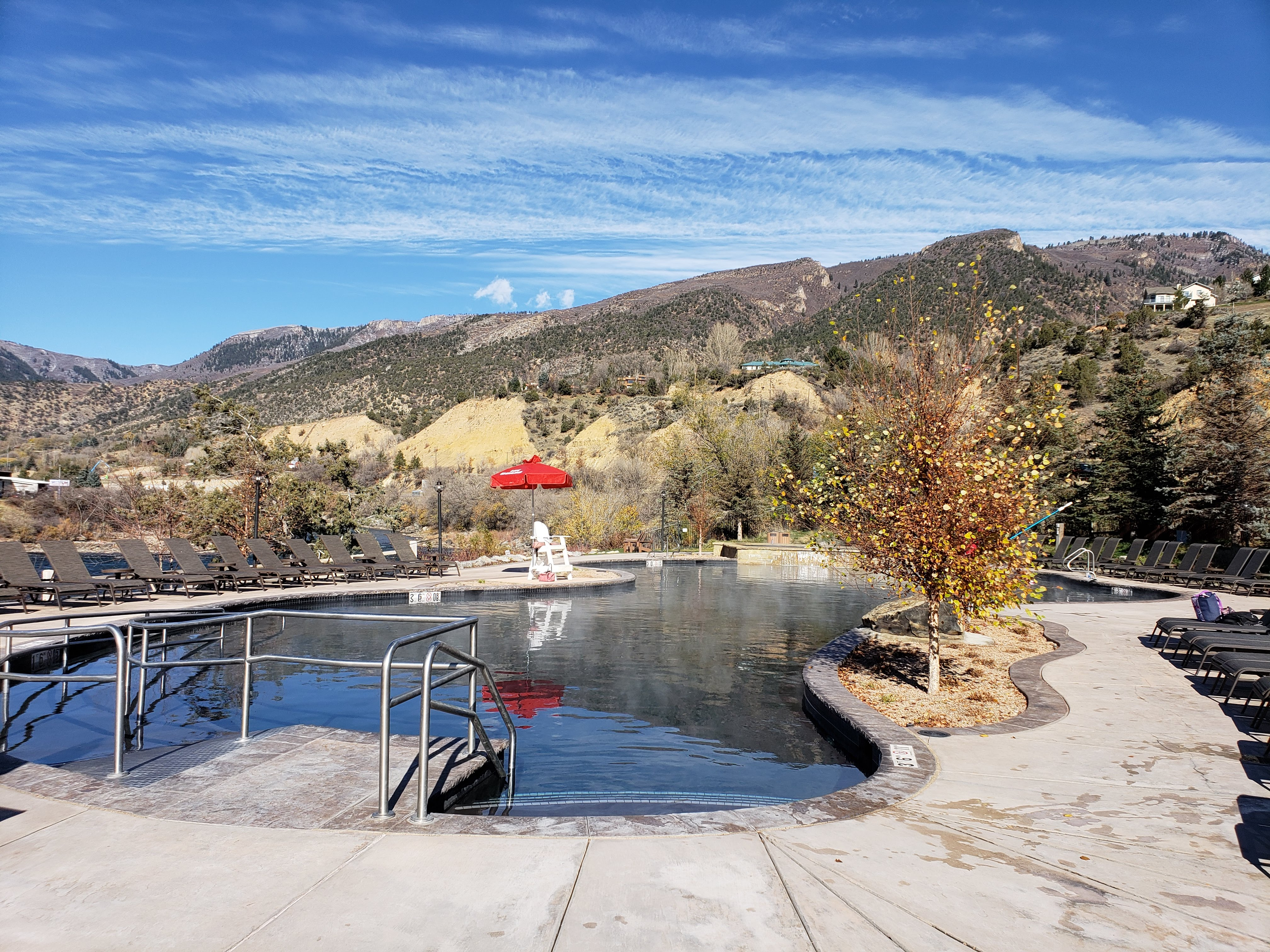
Iron Mountain Hot Springs.

Ouray Hot Springs Pool.

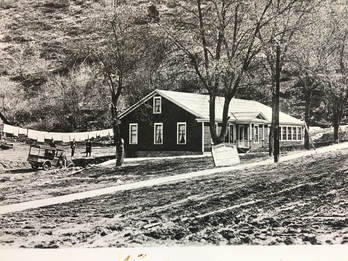
Wiesbaden Hot Springs in 1879.

== See also ==
- Bibliography of Colorado
- Geography of Colorado
- History of Colorado
- Index of Colorado-related articles
- List of Colorado-related lists
  - List of lakes of Colorado
  - List of rivers of Colorado
  - List of waterfalls in Colorado
- Outline of Colorado
- List of hot springs in the United States
