= Michael Prinz von Sachsen-Weimar-Eisenach =

Head of the House of Wettin

Michael
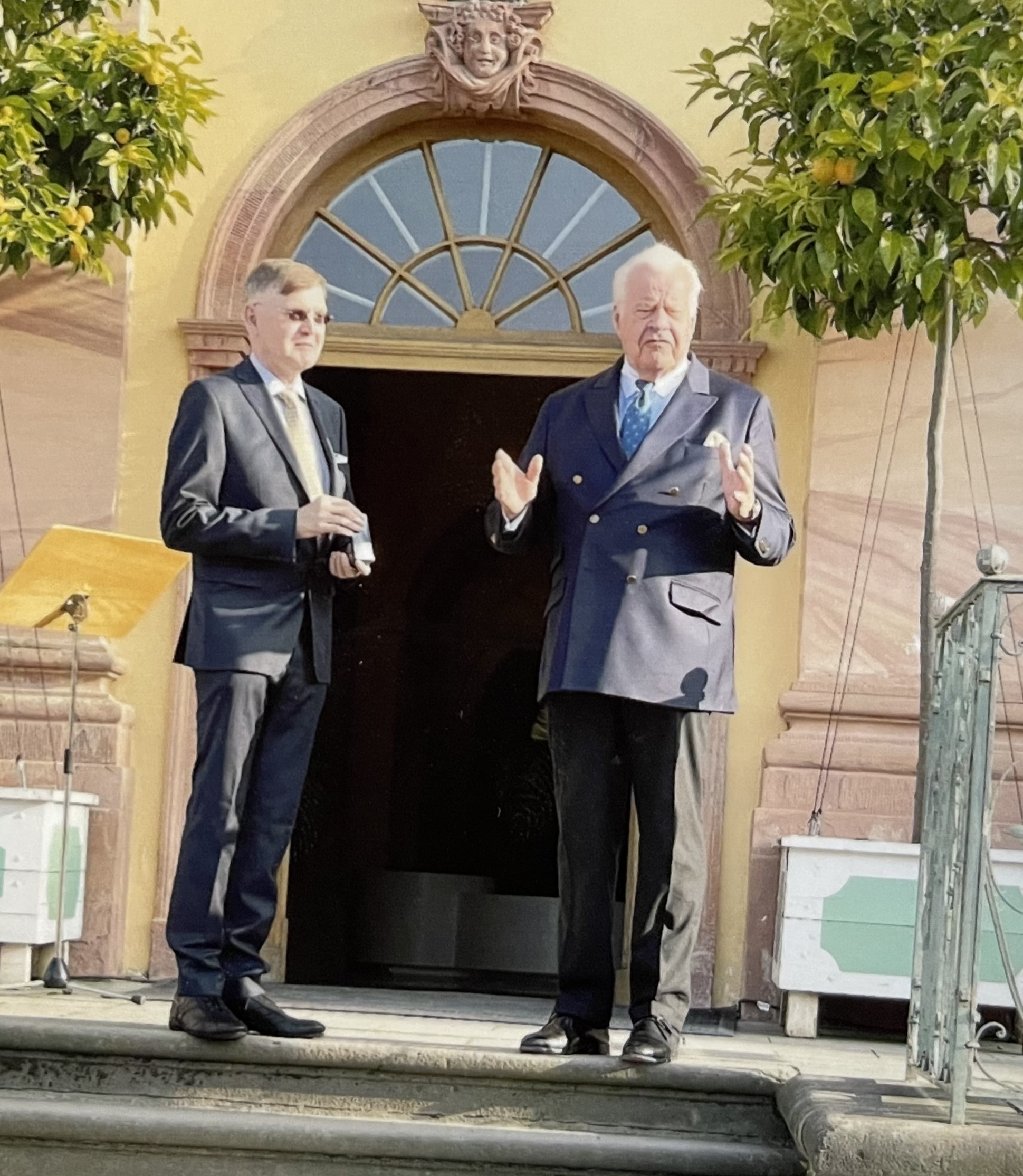
- Michael (right)

Head of the House of Saxe-Weimar-Eisenach
- Tenure: 14 October 1988 – present
- Predecessor: Hereditary Grand Duke Charles Augustus
- Heir presumptive (in pretense): Wilhelm Ernst
- Born: 15 November 1946 (age 79); Bamberg, Germany
- Spouses: Renate Henkel (m. 1970; div. 1974) Dagmar Hennings (m. 1980)
- Issue: 1
Names
- Michael Benedikt Georg Jobst Carl Alexander Bernhard Claus Friedrich
- House: Saxe-Weimar-Eisenach
- Father: Charles Augustus, Hereditary Grand Duke of Saxe-Weimar-Eisenach
- Mother: Baroness Elisabeth von Wangenheim-Winterstein
- Religion: Lutheranism

Michael Prinz von Sachsen-Weimar-Eisenach (born 15 November 1946) is the current head of the Grand Ducal House of Saxe-Weimar-Eisenach, as well as the most senior agnate of the entire House of Wettin.

== Early life ==
Michael was born in Bamberg, Bavaria, the only son of Hereditary Grand Duke Charles Augustus of Saxe-Weimar-Eisenach and Baroness Elisabeth von Wangenheim-Winterstein (1912–2010). Among his godparents were Queen Juliana of the Netherlands and the Grand Duchess Anastasia of Russia imposter, Anna Anderson, who was living with his aunt Princess Luise of Saxe-Meiningen.

When his father died on 14 October 1988, Michael succeeded him as Head of the House of Saxe-Weimar-Eisenach. On 13 February 1991, he inherited the leadership in the House of Saxe-Altenburg, as that line became extinct, and since 23 July 2012 he regards the Albertine royal Saxon line to be extinct. However, Michael has also stated that he "[does not] believe in historical carnival" and that "Germany should have done it like Austria long ago and abolished all titles."; unlike Germany, which abolished royalty and nobility in 1919 but permitted hereditary titles to be legally borne as part of the surname, in Austria the Adelsaufhebungsgesetz (Arbitration Act) of 3 April 1919 additionally outlawed noble titles in names.

In 2004, he withdrew his claim for restitution of numerous properties, archives (partly including those of Schiller and Goethe) as well as priceless artwork in a settlement with the Free State of Thuringia and acquired some forest estates in exchange.

Since Michael has no sons, the current heir to the headship of the grand ducal house is his elder (by age) first cousin, Wilhelm Ernst (b. 10 August 1946), whose only son Georg-Constantin (13 April 1977 – 9 June 2018), a banker who was married but without issue, was killed in a horse riding accident on 9 June 2018 while riding with Jean Christophe Iseux von Pfetten. Therefore, the Grand Ducal House of Saxe-Weimar-Eisenach will most likely become extinct in the male line.

== Marriages ==
Michael married Renate Henkel (b. Heidelberg, 17 September 1947), daughter of industrialist Konrad Henkel and wife Jutta von Hülsen and sister of Christoph Henkel, in a civil ceremony on 9 June 1970 at Hamburg-Eimsbüttel, and religiously on 4 July 1970 at Linnep bei Breitscheid. The marriage was childless and dissolved by divorce at Düsseldorf on 9 March 1974.

He was married secondly to Dagmar Hennings (b. Niederpöcking, Upper Bavaria, 24 June 1948), daughter of Heinrich Hennings and wife Margarethe Schacht, in London on 15 November 1980. They have one daughter, Leonie Prinzessin von Sachsen-Weimar-Eisenach.

Michael Prinz von Sachsen-Weimar-Eisenach House of Saxe-Weimar-Eisenach Cadet branch of the House of Wettin Born: 15 November 1946
Titles in pretence
Preceded by Charles Augustus	— TITULAR — Grand Duke of Saxe-Weimar-Eisenach; 14 October 1988 – present Reason for succession failure: Grand Duchy abolished in 1918	Incumbent; Heir: Prince Wilhelm Ernst of Saxe-Weimar-Eisenach
Preceded by Charles Augustus	Head of the House of Wettin; 14 October 1988 – present	Incumbent; Heir: Prince Wilhelm Ernst of Saxe-Weimar-Eisenach
