= Charles Augustus =

Charles Augustus may refer to:

- Karl August, Grand Duke of Saxe-Weimar-Eisenach (1757–1828)
- Charles Augustus, Hereditary Grand Duke of Saxe-Weimar-Eisenach (1912–1988)
- Charles Augustus, Hereditary Grand Duke of Saxe-Weimar-Eisenach (1844–1894)
- Charles Augustus, Prince of Nassau-Weilburg (1685–1753)
