= Hugo Henkel =

German chemist and industrialist

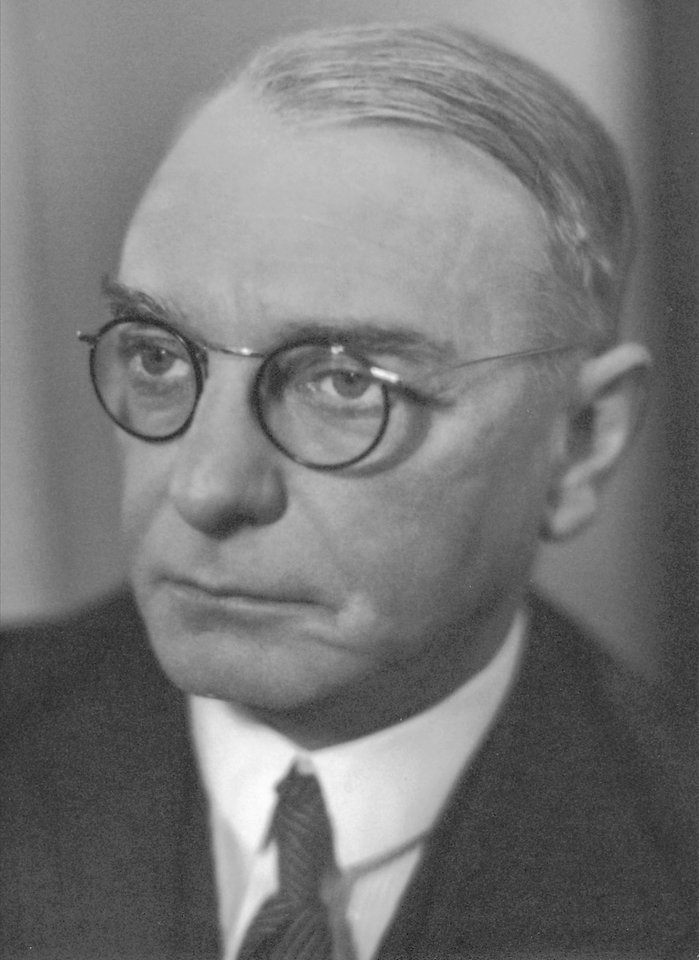
Hugo Henkel (1930)

Hugo Wilhelm Henkel (21 January 1881 – 18 December 1952) was a German chemist and industrialist.

== Biography ==
Hugo Henkel was born in Düsseldorf as the third and youngest son of the married couple Fritz and Elisabeth Henkel, born von der Steinen. He studied chemistry in Stuttgart and Berlin, graduating in 1905 with a doctorate in chemistry. In Stuttgart he became a member of the Corps Stauffia Stuttgart. During his time in Berlin, he was a fellow student of the Corps Saxonia-Berlin. From 1905 he was head of production in his father's company in Düsseldorf-Holthausen and from 1930, he was head of the entire company, of which he had been a partner since 1908. He remained in this position until 1938, after which, under pressure from the National Socialists, he moved to the newly founded advisory and supervisory board. During his time as owner, the company took over some of its competitors. He was instrumental in the founding of the First German Whaling Company mBH, with its headquarters initially in Bremerhaven, and later at Ballindamm in Hamburg.

In 1914, he became a member of the Düsseldorf City Council as a representative of the Liberal Union. On 1 May 1933, he joined the Nazi Party (membership number 2,266,961). From May 1934 to 1942 he was a member of the Düsseldorf City Council and from 1937 at the latest, he was a member of the Supervisory Board of Deutsche Bank AG.

As Hugo Henkel was one of the 42 industrialists on the war crimes list of the special committee of the U.S. Senate (Kilgore Committee), he was arrested in September 1945 and the company was placed under Allied control. In January 1947, he and his two sons, Jost and Konrad, were denazified. This enabled them to regain their property and to realize that the dismantling and renovations between 1948 and 1950 were much less extensive than previously planned. He began rebuilding the destroyed industrial plants, which then resumed operations. He was committed to social and cultural causes. He was a member of the Düsseldorf Chamber of Industry and Commerce. He died in Hösel, now part of Ratingen, in 1952.

In memory of Hugo Henkel's wife Gerda, his daughter Lisa Maskell established the Gerda Henkel Foundation in 1976, which is dedicated to the promotion of science - primarily history, archaeology and art history. To this day, the Foundations headquarters are located in the neo-Baroque villa built in 1911 by Hugo and Gerda Henkel in Malkstenstrasse 15.

From 1905 onwards, he developed a scientifically based "method of hand washing", which gained recognition at home and abroad. After taking over his parents business, he introduced new forms of advertising based on market analysis.

== Family ==
On 19 September 1908, Hugo Henkel married the daughter of the sculptor Karl Janssen, Gerda, in Düsseldorf. Their children Karl Jost (1909-1961), Gerda Ruth (* 1910), Elisabeth (1914-1998), later known as Lisa Maskell, Konrad (1915-1999) and Paul (1916-1942) were born of her marriage. Paul Henkel died in the war on 27 July 1942 in Voronezh, Russia. A granddaughter of Hugo Henkel was the art collector and patron Anette Brandhorst, daughter of Hugo Henkel's daughter Elisabeth from her marriage to the architect Ernst Petersen.

== Awards ==
In 1951 he received an honorary doctorate (Dr. med. h. c.) from the Medical Academy of the University of Düsseldorf and honorary citizenship from the city of Düsseldorf. In addition, he was made an honorary citizen of the University of Bonn in that year and on 9 October 1951 he was awarded the Normann Medal of the German Society for Fat Science for the year 1950.

== Literature ==
Kurt Eisermann: Sie jagten den Wal in der Antarktis. Deutschlands Beteiligung am Walfang im 20.Jahrhundert. In: Männer vom Morgenstern, Heimatbund an Elb- und Wesermündung e. V. (Hrsg.): . Nr. 799. Nordsee-Zeitung GmbH, Bremerhaven Juli 2016, p. 2–3 (Digitalisat )
