= Guillaume Pousaz =

Swiss entrepreneur

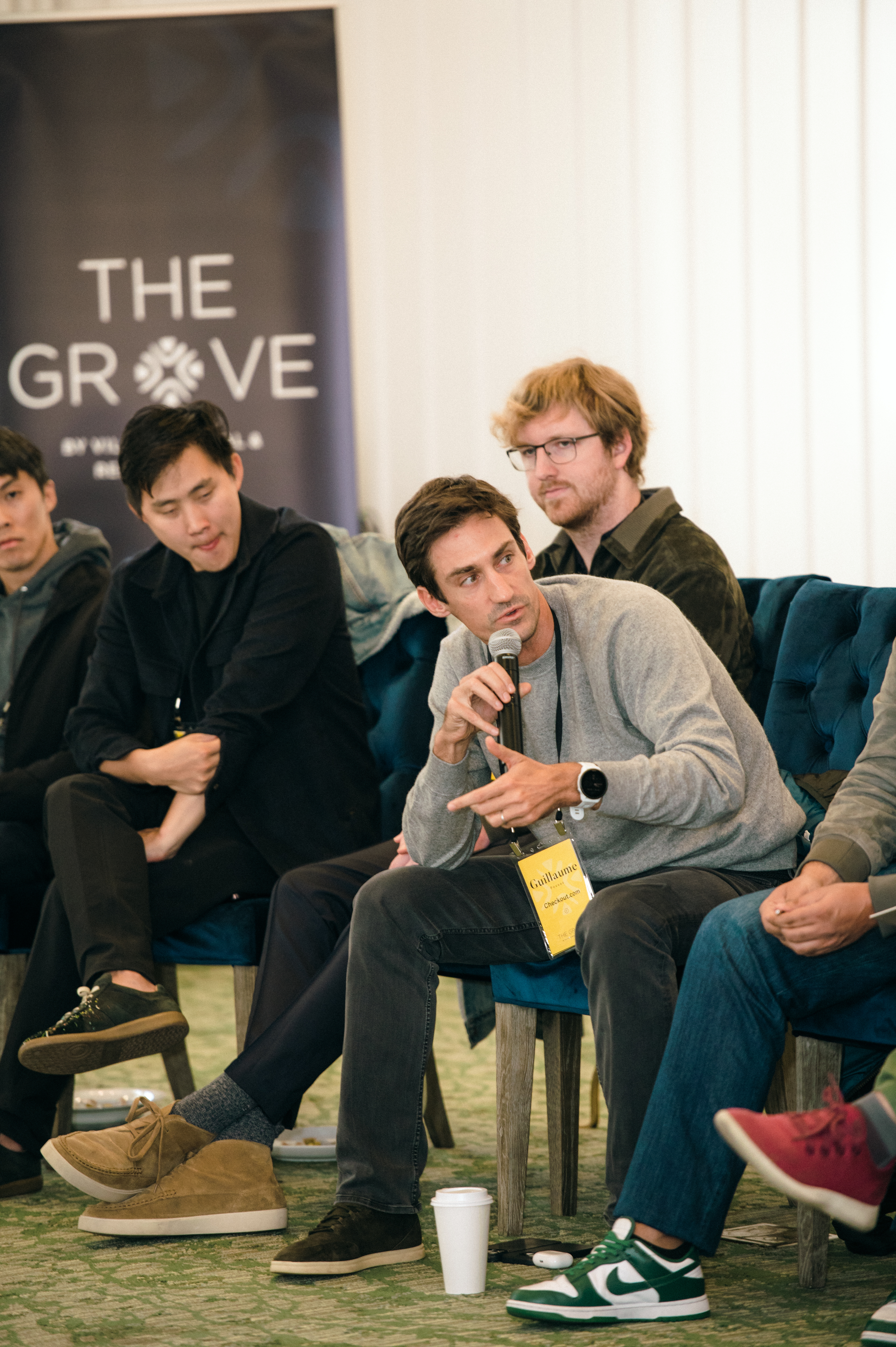
- Born: 6 August 1981 (age 45)
- Education: HEC Lausanne (did not graduate)
- Known for: Founder and CEO of Checkout.com
- Children: 3

Guillaume Pousaz (born 1981) is a Swiss entrepreneur and investor. He is the CEO and founder of payment platform Checkout.com. As of May 2025, he has an estimated net worth of US$7.8 billion, according to Forbes.

== Early life and education ==
Pousaz was born in the outskirts of Geneva, Switzerland, and studied mathematical engineering at École Polytechnique Fédérale de Lausanne, before enrolling in an economics bachelor's degree at HEC Lausanne.

Pousaz initially planned to become an investment banker. He received an offer from Citibank London, but his father's cancer resulted in him leaving HEC Lausanne in 2005 before completing his degree. He then moved to California to pursue surfing.

== Career ==
In 2006, Pousaz joined payments company International Payments Consultants (IPC). He then co-founded NetMerchant, a US to Europe money transfer service, with IPC's head of sales. The company ran until 2009.

In 2009, Pousaz purchased Mauritius-based SMS Pay for US$300,000 over a three-year period to build a next generation payments gateway. That same year, Pausaz founded Singapore-based Opus Payments, which enabled businesses in Hong Kong to process payments from buyers around the world.

Opus Payments rebranded and became Checkout.com in 2012. The company was founded to solve the problem of online payment processing for merchants and their customers. Pousaz is the CEO of Checkout.com and owns an estimated two-thirds of the company.

In 2019, Checkout.com first accepted outside capital in a $230 million funding round that valued the company at $2 billion. At the time, this was the largest Series A funding round ever for a European fintech company.

In January 2021, Checkout.com raised a further US$450 million at a valuation of US$15 billion. As a result, Forbes estimated Pousaz's net worth to be US$9 billion.

Following Checkout.com's 2022 fundraising round of $1 billion, Pousaz's net worth was estimated to be US$20 billion. In the Sunday Times Rich List 2022 ranking of the wealthiest people in the UK he was placed 5th with an estimated net worth of £19.259 billion.

In May 2021, Pousaz established a family office, Zinal Growth, focused on the European technology sector. Investments have included e-commerce startups Ziina and Wayflyer, supply chain emissions monitoring platform Pledge, blockchain firm Snickerdoodle Labs, fintech startup Bloom Money, and others.

== Personal life ==
Pousaz lives in London, is married and has three children (two sons and a daughter).

== Philanthropy ==
Pousaz and his wife founded Pousaz Philanthropies in 2022. The organization focuses on supporting the safety and education of children worldwide.
