= Sunday Times Rich List 2022 =

The Sunday Times Rich List 2022 is the 34th annual survey of the wealthiest people resident in the United Kingdom, published by The Sunday Times online on 20 May 2022 and in print on 22 May 2022.

The list was edited by Robert Watts who succeeded long-term compiler Philip Beresford in 2017. He noted of the 2022 list: "While many of us are experiencing the greatest cost of living squeeze we can remember, the super-rich have had another record year."

The list was widely reported by other media.

== Top 10 fortunes ==
| 2022 | | Name | Citizenship | Source of wealth | 2021 | |
| Rank | Net worth £ bn | Name | Citizenship | Source of wealth | Rank | Net worth £ bn |
|---|---|---|---|---|---|---|
| 01 ▲ | £28.50 ▲ | Sri and Gopi Hinduja | India | Industry and finance | 3 | £17.00 |
| 02 ▲ | £23 ▲ | Sir James Dyson and family | United Kingdom | Industry (Dyson) | 4 | £16.30 |
| 03 ▼ | £22.265 ▲ | David and Simon Reuben and family | United Kingdom | Property and Internet | 2 | £21.465 |
| 04 ▼ | £20.00 ▼ | Sir Len Blavatnik | United States & United Kingdom | Investment, music and media | 1 | £23 |
| 05 ▲ | £19.26 ▲ | Guillaume Pousaz | Switzerland | Payments (Checkout.com) | 33 | £5.54 |
| 06 | £17 ▲ | Lakshmi Mittal and family | India | Steel | 5 | £14.68 |
| 07 ▲ | £15 ▲ | Christoph Henkel and family | Germany | Chemicals (Henkel) | 120 | £1.4 |
| 8 ▲ | £13.5 ▲ | Guy, George, Alannah and Galen Weston and family | Canada & United Kingdom | Retailing | 10 | £11 |
| 09 ▼ | £12.00 ▼ | Kirsten Rausing and Jörn Rausing | Sweden | Inheritance and investment (Tetra Pak) | 7 | £13 |
| 10 ▼ | £11.421 ▼ | Charlene de Carvalho-Heineken and Michel de Carvalho | Netherlands | Inheritance, banking, brewing (Heineken) | 9 | £12.01 |

== See also ==
- Forbes list of billionaires
