= Gabriele Henkel =

German artist

- Born: Gabriele Hünermann; 9 December 1931; Düsseldorf, Germany
- Died: 28 September 2017 (aged 85); Düsseldorf, Germany
- Occupations: Art collector, art patron, author, artist
- Years active: 1950s–2017
- Spouse: Konrad Henkel (m. 1955; his death 1999)
- Children: Christoph Henkel
- Awards: Order of Merit of the Federal Republic of Germany

Signature
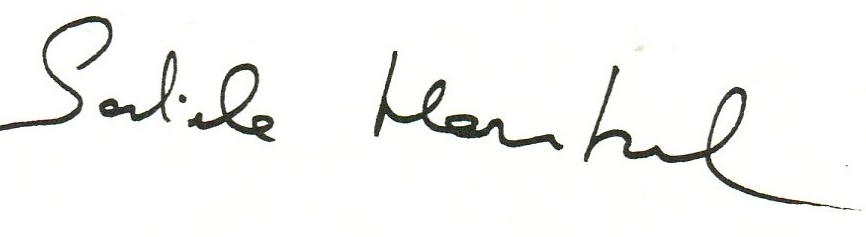

Gabriele Henkel (née Hünermann; 9 December 1931 - 28 September 2017), was a German art collector, art patron, author and artist. She was married to Konrad Henkel, the long-standing head of the Henkel Group.

== Life ==
Gabriele Hünermann was born in Düsseldorf, a daughter of Theodor Hünermann, chief physician of the Marien Hospital there. After a deprived war childhood without schooling, her father sent her to London to be an au pair at the age of 16. After which she worked as a journalist for the weekly magazines, The Observer and Newsweek, and was the youngest member of the Federal Press Conference when she met Konrad Henkel at the Rhenish Carnival. The couple married in 1955, she took her husband's last name.

From 1970 to 2000, she collected art from all over the world for the Henkel company, therefore building up the Group's art collection. The works are located in the offices, meeting rooms and staff canteens at the companies headquarters in Düsseldorf. The collection comprises about 4,000 works.

Since 1972 she was a member of the International Advisory Board of the Museum of Modern Art in New York City.

Through Bazon Brock, she received a lectureship for art history at the University of Wuppertal in 1983 where she became an honorary professor for communication design.

In 2001 she founded the Kythera Cultural Foundation, which has been awarding the Kythera Prize annually since 2002.

Henkel was awarded the Order of Merit of the Federal Republic of Germany, 1st Class. In 2009, she was honored with the Order of Merit of the State of North Rhine-Westphalia for her commitment to art and art education.

In 2016, she exhibited 40 pieces from the collection of classical modern and contemporary art outside the company for the first time at the K 20 art collection in Düsseldorf.

In August 2017, she published her memoirs under the title Die Zeit ist ein Augenblick. On 28 September 2017, an exhibition of Gabriele Henkel's works was opened at the Hetjens Museum in Düsseldorf. She played a decisive role in the design. She was not present at the vernissage; she died the following night at the age of 85.

Konrad and Gabriele Henkel are the parents of Christoph Henkel.

== Literature ==
- Tafelbilder. DuMont Reiseverlag, Cologne 1990, ISBN 978-3-7701-2418-3
- Les beaux restes – Bilder der Vergänglichkeit. Klinkhardt und Biermann, Munich 1995, ISBN 978-3-7814-0389-5
- Heine. Ein Bildermärchen. DuMont Reiseverlag, Cologne 1997, ISBN 978-3-7701-4192-0
- Gabriele Henkel: Weiß ist alle Theorie – Zwischenräume, Richter, Düsseldorff 2001, ISBN 978-3-933807-62-5
- The Collection at Home – Sammlung Henkel. Zwei Bände, DuMont Literatur und Kunst Verlag, Cologne 2009, ISBN 978-3-8321-9147-4 and ISBN 978-3-8321-9192-4
- Aquarelle – Malereien am Wasser. Grupello Verlag, Düsseldorf 2015, ISBN 978-3-89978-228-8
- Die Zeit ist ein Augenblick: Erinnerungen. Deutsche Verlagsanstalt, Munich 2017, ISBN 978-3-641-22497-4
