= Katrin Bellinger =

German art dealer (born 1958)

- Born: October 1958 (age 67)
- Occupation: Art dealer
- Spouse: Christoph Henkel
- Children: 2

Katrin Bellinger (born October 1958) is a London-based German art dealer and collector, specialising in Old Master drawings.

== Early life ==
Katrin Bellinger was born in October 1958. Her family owned a chain of department stores.

== Career ==
Bellinger is an art dealer and collector, specialising in Old Master drawings.

Bellinger was a partner at London art dealers Colnaghi for thirteen years, until the company was merged with Spanish gallery Coll & Cortez in 2015. One of Bellinger’s primary roles was managing its art library and 225-foot archive, which she and her partner Konrad Bernheimer bought from Christoph Graf Douglas, the former head of Sotheby’s in Germany and the son-in-law of Rudolf August Oetker, whose company owned Colnaghi between Jacob Rothschild and Bernheimer.

In addition to her professional career in the arts, Bellinger assembled a private collection of more than 900 works, including paintings, prints, photographs, and sculptures. In 2001, she founded the Tavolozza Foundation, a non-profit organisation based in Munich.

In March 2016, Bellinger was appointed a trustee of the National Gallery, for four years, from 29 March 2016. She has served on several Visiting Committees at the Metropolitan Museum of Art.

== Personal life ==
Bellinger resides in London, England and Dunton Hot Springs, Colorado, and is married to Christoph Henkel, a billionaire businessman. They have two sons.
