= Charles Augustus, Hereditary Grand Duke of Saxe-Weimar-Eisenach =

Charles Augustus, Hereditary Grand Duke of Saxe-Weimar-Eisenach may refer to:

- Charles Augustus, Hereditary Grand Duke of Saxe-Weimar-Eisenach (1844–1894)
- Charles Augustus, Hereditary Grand Duke of Saxe-Weimar-Eisenach (1912–1988)
