= Hinkle =

Hinkle or Hinkles or Hinckle may refer to:

== People with the surname ==
- Beatrice M. Hinkle, psychotherapist, author
- Branden Lee Hinkle, American mixed martial arts fighter
- Bryan Hinkle, American football player
- Carl Hinkle, American football player
- Clarke Hinkle, American football player
- George M. Hinkle, American leader in the Latter Day Saint movement
- Gordie Hinkle, American baseball player
- Jackson Hinkle, conservative and Marxist-Leninist political commentator
- James F. Hinkle, New Mexico Governor, 1923-1925
- Jason Hinkle, American musician
- Jedediah Hinkle, American politician
- Kathy Hinkle, American politician
- Lon Hinkle, American golfer
- Marin Hinkle, American actress
- Phillip Hinkle, American politician
- Robert Lewis Hinkle, U.S. federal judge
- Tony Hinkle, American basketball coach
- Warren Hinckle, American political journalist

== Fictional ==
- Adenoid Hynkel, fictional fascist leader, played by Charlie Chaplin in The Great Dictator
- Eric Hinkle, fictional character from the fantasy book The Secrets of Droon
- Mr. Hinkle, a character in the Canadian cartoon My Pet Monster
- Paul Hinkle, a character on the Canadian TV show Caillou
- Professor Hinkle, a bumbling magician from Frosty the Snowman

== Places ==
- Clarke Hinkle Field, football practice facility
- Hinkle Fieldhouse, basketball arena
- Hinkles, Georgia
- Hinkle, Kentucky
- Hinkle, Oregon, unincorporated community
  - Hinkle Locomotive Service and Repair Facility, locomotive shop in Hinkle
- Hinkle-Murphy House, historical building

== Other ==
- 18948 Hinkle, asteroid

== See also ==
- Henkle, surname
