= Elisabeth, Hereditary Grand Duchess of Saxe-Weimar-Eisenach =

Elisabeth
- Hereditary Grand Duchess of Saxe-Weimar-Eisenach
- Born: 16 January 1912; Tübingen, Kingdom of Württemberg, German Empire
- Died: 15 March 2010 (aged 98); Munich, Bavaria, Germany
- Burial: Wartburg Castle, Eisenach, Germany
- Spouse: Charles Augustus, Hereditary Grand Duke of Saxe-Weimar-Eisenach (m. 1944; died 1988)
- Issue: Princess Elisabeth; Michael, Prince of Saxe-Weimar-Eisenach; Princess Beatrice-Maria, Mrs. Davidson
- House: Saxe-Weimar-Eisenach (by marriage)
- Father: Baron Othmar von Wangenheim-Winterstein
- Mother: Baroness Maud von Trützschler zum Falkenstein

Baroness Elisabeth of Wangenheim-Winterstein (German: Elisabeth Freiin von Wangenheim-Winterstein; 16 January 1912 – 15 March 2010) was a German noblewoman by birth and became the titular Hereditary Grand Duchess of Saxe-Weimar-Eisenach through her marriage to Charles Augustus, Hereditary Grand Duke of Saxe-Weimar-Eisenach.

== Early life ==
Elisabeth and her twin sister, Dorothée, were born on 16 January 1912 in Tübingen, Kingdom of Württemberg, into the Uradel House of Wangenheim. She was the daughter of Baron Othmar von Wangenheim-Winterstein, who served as Hofmarschall to the honorary court of Hohenzollern-Sigmaringen, and his wife, Baroness Mathilde "Maud" von Trützschler zum Falkenstein. Her early childhood was centered at Behringen Castle in Thuringia.

Following her mother's death during childbirth in 1913, her early studies as a pianist in Hanover were cut short to assist her widowed father with the management of the family estate. Her early musical education initiated a lifelong affinity for classical composers, particularly Mozart, and literature.

== Marriage and issue ==
On 5 October 1944, Elisabeth married Charles Augustus at Wartburg Castle near Eisenach. He was the eldest son and heir of Wilhelm Ernst, Grand Duke of Saxe-Weimar-Eisenach, and his second wife, Princess Feodora of Saxe-Meiningen. The marriage produced three children:

- Princess Elisabeth of Saxe-Weimar-Eisenach (born 1945), married Mindert Diderik de Kant in 1981, and divorced in 1983, without issue.
- Prince Michael of Saxe-Weimar-Eisenach (born 1946), current head of the grand ducal house, married Renate Rennhack in 1970, and subsequently remarried Dagmar Hennings in 1980, leaving issue.
- Princess Beatrice-Maria of Saxe-Weimar-Eisenach (born 1948), married Martin Charles Davidson in 1977 and had issue.

Because noble privileges were officially unrecognised following the German Revolution of 1918–19, the couple maintained their titles purely by courtesy. Prior to the birth of their first child, they fled their ancestral properties in eastern Germany to escape the advance of the Soviet Red Army. They initially took refuge at Weikersheim Castle, having lost the vast majority of their land and personal properties. A portion of their lost capital was eventually compensated by the German government following complex legal claims regarding Soviet-era expropriations, though the family never resettled in Thuringia.

== Later life and death ==
Elisabeth and her husband eventually lived separately, though they never formally divorced. Following the marriages of her children, she lived quietly in Munich for the final fourteen years of her life to reside near her eldest daughter. Elisabeth died on 15 March 2010 at the age of 98 in Munich. Her remains were interred at the family burial site at Wartburg Castle, matching her long-standing domestic request.

Elisabeth, Hereditary Grand Duchess of Saxe-Weimar-Eisenach Wangenheim-Winterstein Born: 16 January 1912 Died: 15 March 2010
Titles in pretence
Preceded by Princess Feodora of Saxe-Meiningen	— TITULAR — Grand Duchess consort of Saxe-Weimar-Eisenach; 5 Octorber 1944 – 14 October 1988; Reason for succession failure: Grand Duchy abolished in 1918	Succeeded by Dagmar Hennings
