= Princess Feodora of Saxe-Meiningen (1890–1972) =

Feodora of Saxe-Meiningen
- Grand Duchess of Saxe-Weimar-Eisenach
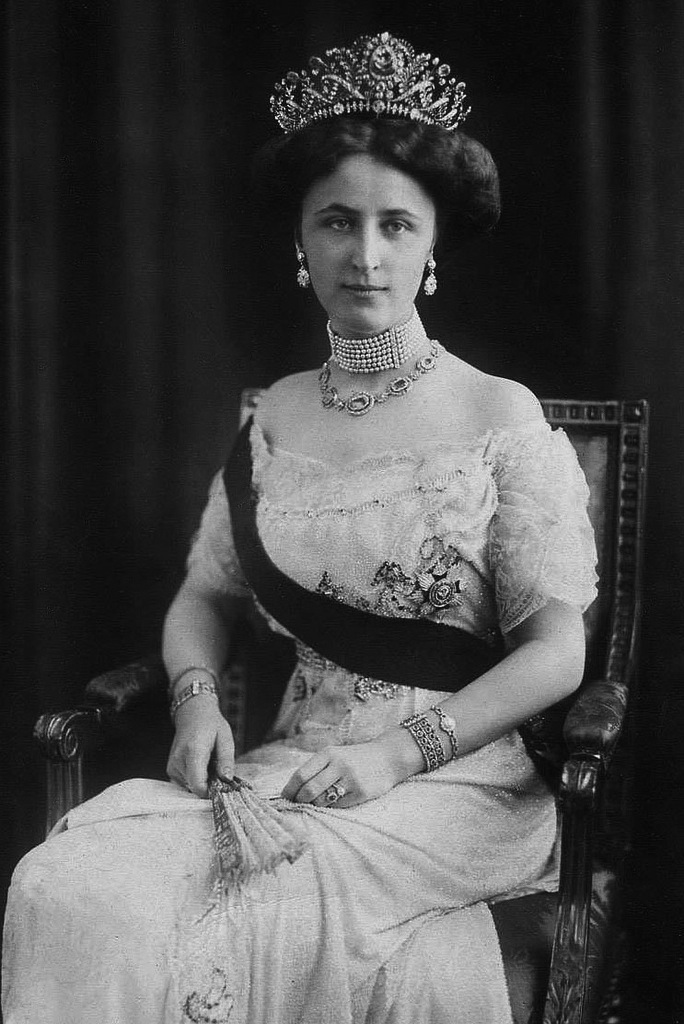
- Feodora in 1916.

Grand Duchess consort of Saxe-Weimar-Eisenach
- Tenure: 21 January 1910 – 9 November 1918
- Born: 29 May 1890; Hanover, Germany
- Died: 12 March 1972 (aged 81); Freiburg im Breisgau
- Spouse: Wilhelm Ernst, Grand Duke of Saxe-Weimar-Eisenach (m. 1910; died 1923)
- Issue: Sophie Louise, Princess of Schwarzburg; Charles Augustus, Hereditary Grand Duke of Saxe-Weimar-Eisenach; Prince Bernhard; Prince Georg
Names
- Feodora Karola Charlotte Marie Adelheid Auguste Mathilde
- House: Saxe-Meiningen
- Father: Prince Friedrich Johann of Saxe-Meiningen
- Mother: Countess Adelaide of Lippe-Biesterfeld

Princess Feodora of Saxe-Meiningen (Feodora Karola Charlotte Marie Adelheid Auguste Mathilde; 29 May 1890 – 12 March 1972) was the eldest child of Prince Friedrich Johann of Saxe-Meiningen, a younger son of Georg II, Duke of Saxe-Meiningen, and Countess Adelaide of Lippe-Biesterfeld, a daughter of Ernst, Count of Lippe-Biesterfeld. By marriage, she was known as Grand Duchess of Saxe-Weimar-Eisenach.

== Biography ==
=== Marriage ===
During a summer visit to the palace Wilhelmshöhe, Feodora was urged by her kinsman Emperor Wilhelm II to make a match with the widowed Wilhelm Ernst, Grand Duke of Saxe-Weimar-Eisenach. He had been serving with the Prussian artillery during that time. Despite his role in their engagement however, Emperor Wilhelm refused to attend the wedding. This caused much speculation, as he and his wife were very close to the Grand Duke. This was seen by many to be due to mutual ill will between Wilhelm and Feodora's grandfather Georg II, Duke of Saxe-Meiningen, whose morganatic wedding to Ellen Franz had displeased many royal personages like Wilhelm. Georg was the only ruler of a reigning German dynasty who had never visited the Emperor upon his accession in 1888, and who, in turn, had never received any imperial German visitors at his own court. Wilhelm's disapproval was even more surprising in that he had recently allowed the marriage between a Hohenzollern dynast (Prince Frederick William of Prussia) with a much lower-ranked member of the nobility (Princess Agatha of Hohenlohe-Schillingsfürst); it was considered odd that he refused to recognize one equal marriage yet acknowledged another lesser match, especially when the latter was within his own family and subject to the rigid Hohenzollern house laws.

The Emperor's boycott of the wedding was so strongly resented in Saxe-Meiningen that, when newspapers announced that Wilhelm would not be attending the wedding, the official communication from the royal palace declared that he had never been invited.

On 14 January 1910 in Meiningen, Feodora was married to Wilhelm Ernst. She was his second wife (his first wife Princess Caroline Reuss, Elder Line had died childless after eighteen months of marriage in 1905). This first marriage had been unhappy, as Karoline disliked the Weimar court, eventually fleeing to Switzerland. After being persuaded to return to court, her death soon after was considered by some to be suicide.

=== Court life ===
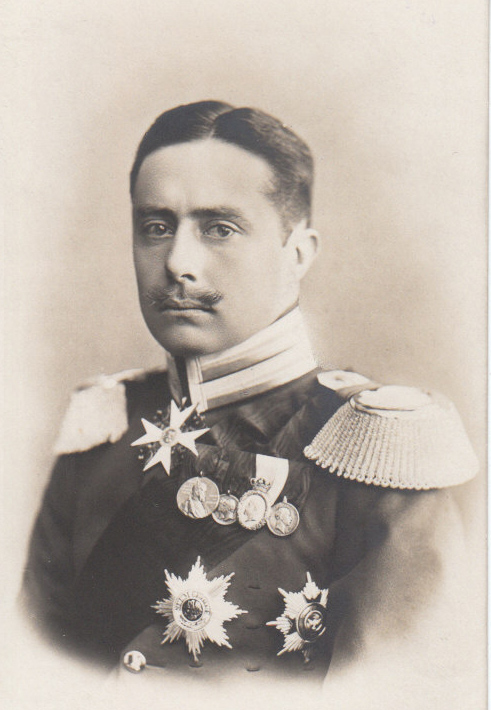
Feodora's husband Ernst.

Feodora's marriage was unhappy; the Weimar court was generally considered to be one of the most stifling and etiquette-driven in Germany. One source recounted:

"It envelops royalty there in a species of captivity, and while the grand duke lends thereto and is too conservative to admit of any change, it crushes with its trammels the more spirited members of the family".

Feodora was unhappy in such an environment; at the age of 23, reports leaked out that she was staying at a sanatorium for her health. She was stricken with a severe attack of measles and scarlet fever, which she had acquired while visiting an asylum she had founded. Her increased attentions to this particular asylum were attributed to her unhappiness at court, and seen as an escape. The extreme etiquette also caused there to be a distance between herself and the Grand Duke, as well as with their young children. While reports did not call her husband particularly cruel, he was, according to one source:

"One of the wealthiest sovereigns in Europe; stolid, well-behaved, imbued with great pride of race, and a strict sense of what is due to the anointed of the Lord. He is also one of the most severely respected and proper of German rulers...the Grand Duke is very dull, and his court and environment reflect his character in this respect to such a point that Weimar has become the dreariest capital in Europe".

Feodora was very popular among the middle and lower classes of Weimar; this was largely attributed to her charm and kindness to the poor and suffering.

=== Later life ===
On 9 November 1918 Wilhelm Ernst—along with the rest of the German monarchs following the defeat of Germany in World War I—was forced to abdicate. His throne and all his lands were relinquished and he fled with his family to the family estate in Silesia, where he died four years later. Feodora died on 12 March 1972 in Freiburg im Breisgau, Germany.

=== Issue ===
Feodora and her husband had four children:

| Name | Birth | Death | Notes |
|---|---|---|---|
| Princess Sophie Luise | 20 March 1911 | 21 November 1988 | married Friedrich Günther, Prince of Schwarzburg; the marriage ended in divorce less than a year later. There were no children. |
| Karl August, Hereditary Grand Duke of Saxe-Weimar-Eisenach | 28 July 1912 | 14 October 1988 | married Baroness Elisabeth von Wangenheim-Winterstein; had issue |
| Prince Bernhard | 3 March 1917 | 23 March 1986 | his daughter Princess Katharina of Saxe-Weimar-Eisenach (born 30 November 1943) married Prince Emanuel Joseph of Hohenzollern-Emden, son of Franz Joseph, Prince of Hohenzollern-Emden, on 25 May 1968 (divorced in 1985) |
| Prince Georg | 24 November 1921 | 11 March 2011 | changed name to Jörg Brena in 1953 and renounced his succession rights |

== Ancestry ==
Ancestors of Princess Feodora of Saxe-Meiningen (1890–1972)

8. Bernhard II, Duke of Saxe-Meiningen
4. Georg II, Duke of Saxe-Meiningen
9. Princess Marie Frederica of Hesse-Kassel
2. Prince Friedrich of Saxe-Meiningen
10. Ernst I, Prince of Hohenlohe-Langenburg
5. Princess Feodora of Hohenlohe-Langenburg
11. Princess Feodora of Leiningen
1. Princess Feodora of Saxe-Meiningen
12. Julius, Count of Lippe-Biesterfeld
6. Ernest, Count of Lippe-Biesterfeld
13. Countess Adelheid of Castell-Castell
3. Countess Adelaide of Lippe-Biesterfeld
14. Count Leopold Otto von Wartensleben
7. Countess Karoline von Wartensleben
15. Mathilde Halbach

Princess Feodora of Saxe-Meiningen (1890–1972) House of Saxe-Meiningen Born: 29 May 1890 Died: 12 March 1972
German royalty
| Preceded by Princess Caroline Reuss of Greiz | Grand Duchess consort of Saxe-Weimar-Eisenach; 21 January 1910 – 9 November 1918 | Monarchy abolished German revolution |
