= Henkle =

Henkle is a surname, an Americanized form of German Henkel, a pet form of Henke, which in turn is a pet form of the personal names Heinrich or Johannes. Notable people with the surname include:

- Eli Jones Henkle (1828–1893), American politician
- Henrietta Buckmaster (real name Henrietta Henkle; 1909–1983), American activist, journalist and author
- Joseph W. Henkle Sr. (1906–1983), American politician

== See also ==
- Henkle v. Gregory, a federal lawsuit in the United States
- Hinkle (disambiguation)
