= Ernest Henkel =

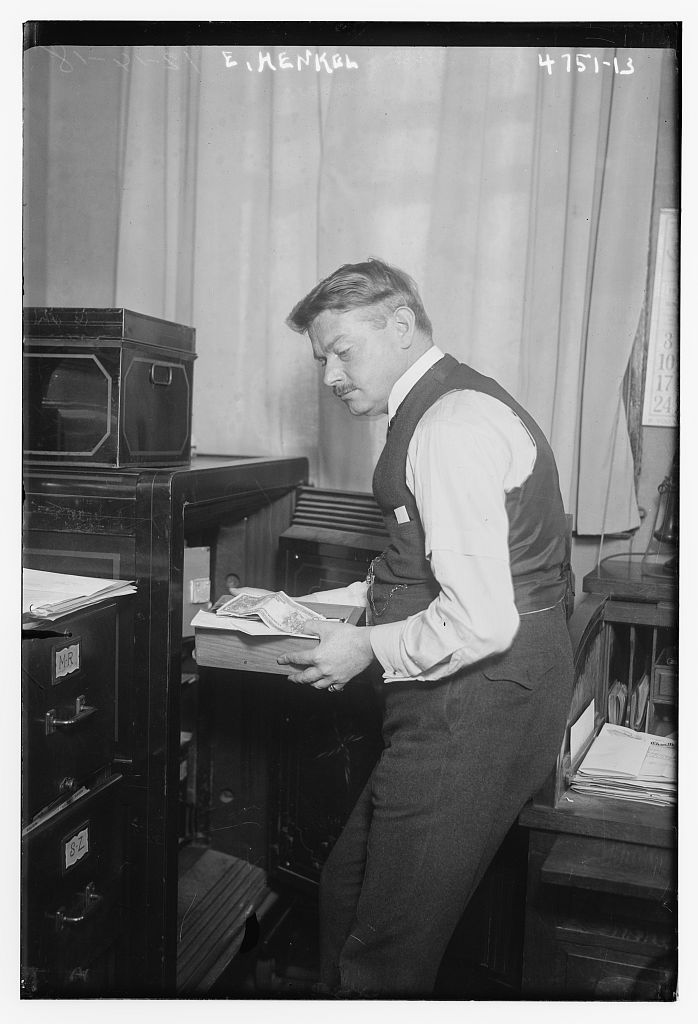

Ernest Henkel (December 26, 1876 - September 3, 1935) was the personnel manager of the Metropolitan Opera.

== Biography ==
He was born on December 26, 1876, in Germany. His family became citizens of England.

He married Ceceline Casean on 24 July 1909 in Brooklyn, New York City. Their daughter, Marta Henkel was a dancer.

In 1917 he was arrested for carrying alcohol in the trunk of his car into Atlanta, Georgia while there for business.

He died at a homeless shelter run by the Temporary Emergency Relief Administration in Manhattan during the Great Depression on September 2, 1935.
