= Ziina =

UAE-based financial services company

- Native name: زينة
- Type: Private
- Industry: Financial services
- Founded: January 2020; 6 years ago
- Founders: Faisal Toukan, Sarah Toukan, Talal Toukan
- Headquarters: Dubai, United Arab Emirates
- Services: Digital payments, peer-to-peer transfers, payment links, QR code payments, Tap to Pay
- Number of employees: 80
- Website: www.ziina.com

Ziina Founders, L to R: Sarah Toukan, Talal Toukan, Faisal Toukan

Ziina (زينة) is a licensed UAE financial services company, founded in 2020. It offers digital payments services for consumers and businesses, including peer-to-peer transfers, payment links, QR and NFC (Tap to Pay) acceptance, and a payment gateway for SMEs. The company is licensed by The Central Bank of the UAE. It received a Stored Value Facility (SVF) license in 2024, a Retail Payment Services (RPS) Category III license in 2026 and Exchange Business Category IV authorization under SVF in 2026.

== History ==
- January 2020: Founded by Faisal Toukan, Sarah Toukan, Talal Toukan
- May 2020: Launched app, secured $850K pre-seed round led by Class 5 Global
- June 2021: Raised $7.5M seed round led by Avenir Growth Capital
- August 2022: Introduced "ZiiBoard", a keyboard for generating payment links on social media.
- May 2023: Introduced its payment gateway, enabling SMEs to accept online card payments via website integrations.
- August 2024: Granted Stored Value Facility (SVF) license by CBUAE
- September 2024: Raised US $22 million in Series A funding led by Altos Ventures.
- April 2025: Launched Tap to Pay on iPhone and Android, enabling merchants to accept contactless payments via smartphone.
- July 2025: Partnered with Dubai CommerCity free zone to offer SME financial services.
- October 2025: Launched digital card for instant payments with Visa
- January 2026: Launched Ziina Violet lifestyle membership program
- January 2026: Processed the UAE's first Open Finance payment with Lean Technologies
- June 2026: Executed the UAE's first one tap, Pay by Bank experience
- August 2026: Granted Retail Payment Services (RPS) Cat III license and Exchange House authorization under SVF by CBUAE
- November 2026: Granted Dubai-it Award in the field of Business by HH Sheikh Hamdan bin Mohammad bin Rashid

== Products ==
Ziina is known for the following products and services available to businesses and consumers in the UAE:

- Peer‑to‑peer wallet: Enables instant money transfers using mobile numbers, with no IBAN or SWIFT code necessary.
- Payment links: Shareable links for use on social media and messaging platforms.
- Payment gateway: Integrated checkout solutions for SMEs accepting cards online, supporting multiple currencies.
- In‑person acceptance: Tap to Pay on iPhone, Tap to Pay on Android, as well QR code payments.
- Multi‑currency settlement: Up to ten currencies supported on gateway transactions.
- Ziina Business Card: A payment card integrated with the wallet for expense tracking & supplier payouts.
- Other products include Invoicing features, multi-user access, custom API integrations, oath sign-in, and embedded checkout
