= Dunton Hot Springs =

Geothermal springs and resort in Dolores County, Colorado, United States

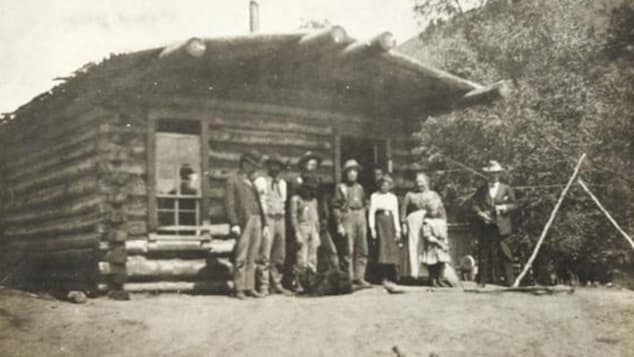
- Dunton Hot Springs cabin, c. 1880s
- Interactive map of Dunton Hot Springs
- Location: Dolores County, Colorado
- Coordinates: 37.7716°N 108.0928°W
- Elevation: 8,921 feet (2,719 m)
- Type: geothermal
- Temperature: 108 °F (42 °C)

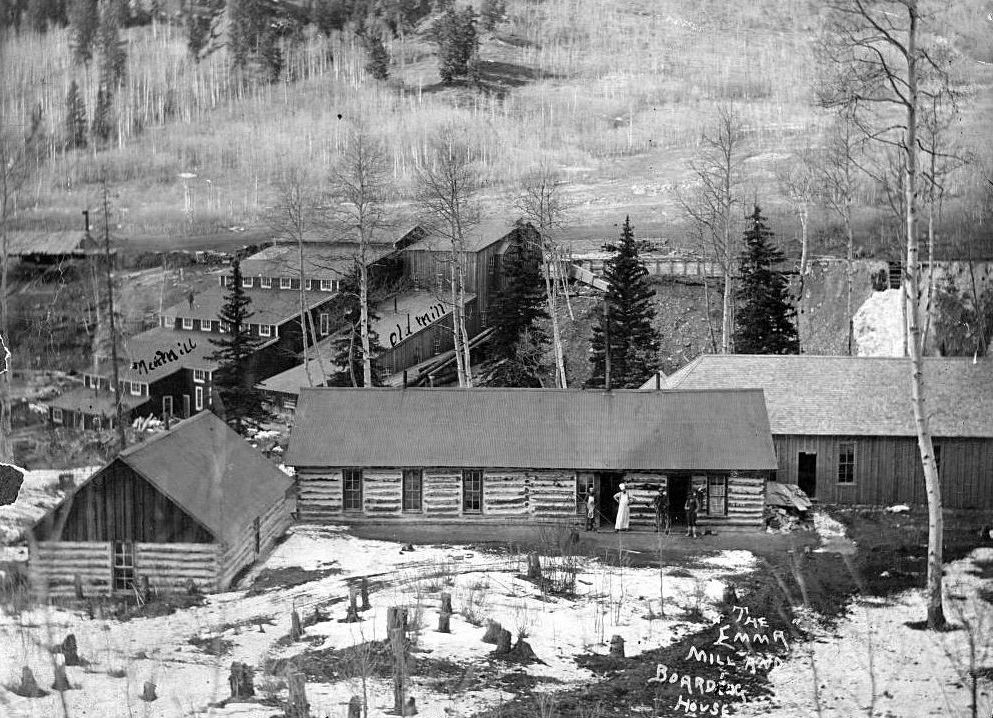
Emma Mills and boarding house, Dunton, Colorado, c. 1900

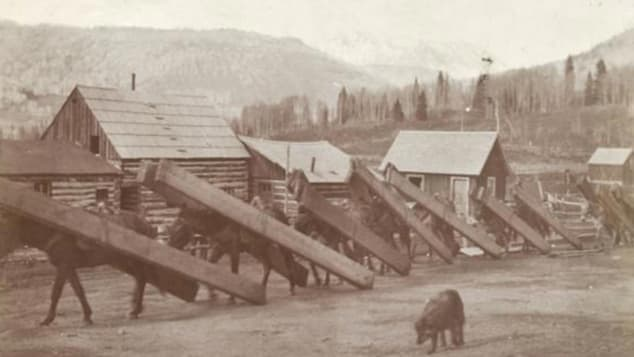
Dunton Hot Springs men moving lumber, c. 1880s

Dunton Hot Springs is a geothermal mineral spring located at an elevation of 8,921 feet (2,719 m) in the San Juan Mountains of Dolores County, Colorado, United States. The springs lie 35 miles (56 km) northeast of Cortez, and 25 miles (40 km) southwest of Telluride.

The unincorporated community of Dunton, Colorado, is a group of log buildings that lie on the West Fork of the Dolores River 530 feet (160 m) northwest of the springs.

== History ==
In 1885, Dunton Hot Springs was a homestead that was settled by Horatio Dunton, a miner. The area was attractive to miners due to the mineral-rich geology, and the hot springs in the area. The Smuggler, Emma, and American mines were located nearby. The Dunton, Colorado, post office operated from August 9, 1892, until November 30, 1954. The Dolores, Colorado, post office (ZIP code 81323) now serves the area. At the peak of its population, 500 people lived in Dunton.

In the 1890s, Dunton Hot Springs attracted gold miners, trappers and prostitutes. In 1895, Joe and Dominica Roscio founded the town and established a dude ranch there, Rancho Dolores. The Roscio's converted a saloon into a bathhouse for miners.

In 1905, Dunton had a population between 260 and 300.

In the 1970s, the Roscio family sold the property to Stephen Wendell. In the 70s and 80s, the hot springs attracted travelers, hippies, bikers, musicians and poets who camped in cabins during the summer. The rent for a cabin at the time was a dollar or two per week. During this time, a dude ranch was in operation. Over time, traditional visitors gave way to a demographic who bathed in the hot springs nude.

In 1980, Stephen Wendell sold the property to investors from New York.

By 1990, the settlement became a ghost town again. In 1994, Christoph Henkel, a German art dealer bought the town, he and a group of German investors developed the site into a resort in the 1990s. In 1987, rooms in the lodge or cabins with hot springs access was $15 per night per person. In 2005, cabins were renting for $600 to $800 per night; by 2018 cabins were renting between $630 and $2,100 per night effectively limiting access to most people other than the wealthy.

== Water profile and geology ==
The hot water emerges from the source at 108 °F (42 °C). The hot springs have a low mineral content compared to other Rico area springs. Its water contains primarily calcium-bicarbonate. Dunton spring water is also very low in lithium (below detection), boron, bromide, magnesium and chloride; the presence of these minerals is lower than other area springs.

The two Dunton hot spring vents are situated in red sandstone and shale surface bedrock. The spring lies along a "Miocene N-S fault which is approximately parallel to a local syncline and brings the Jurassic Morrison Formation into contact with older units of the Dolores (Chinle) Formation and the Jurassic Entrada Formations."

== Location ==
Dunton Hot Springs is located in Dolores County, on West Fork Road #38 in Dolores, Colorado, approximately 6 miles (9.7 kilometers) Northwest of the town of Rico, on the bank of the west fork of the Dolores River. The elevation of the hot springs is 8,921 feet (2,719 meters). Paradise and Geyser Hot Springs are located nearby.

== See also ==
- List of ghost towns in Colorado
- List of hot springs in the United States
- List of populated places in Colorado
- List of post offices in Colorado
