= Charles Augustus, Hereditary Grand Duke of Saxe-Weimar-Eisenach (1912–1988) =

Charles Augustus
- Hereditary Grand Duke of Saxe-Weimar-Eisenach

Head of the House of Saxe-Weimar-Eisenach
- Tenure: 24 April 1923 – 14 October 1988
- Predecessor: Wilhelm Ernst
- Successor: Michael
- Born: 28 July 1912; Schloss Wilhelmsthal
- Died: 14 October 1988 (aged 76); Schienen am Bodensee
- Spouse: Baroness Elisabeth von Wangenheim-Winterstein (m. 1944)
- Issue: 3, including Prince Michael
Names
- German: Carl August Wilhelm Ernst Friedrich Georg Johann Albrecht; English: Charles Augustus William Ernest Frederick George John Albert
- House: Saxe-Weimar-Eisenach
- Father: Wilhelm Ernst, Grand Duke of Saxe-Weimar-Eisenach
- Mother: Feodora of Saxe-Meiningen

Charles Augustus, Hereditary Grand Duke of Saxe-Weimar-Eisenach (Carl August Wilhelm Ernst Friedrich Georg Johann Albrecht; 28 July 1912 – 14 October 1988), was a German prince and head of the grand ducal house of Saxe-Weimar-Eisenach.

== Life ==
He was born in Schloss Wilhelmsthal as the eldest son and heir of Wilhelm Ernst, Grand Duke of Saxe-Weimar-Eisenach, and his second wife, Princess Feodora of Saxe-Meiningen. His father's reign came to an end on 9 November 1918, as a result of the German revolution.

When his father died on 24 April 1923, Charles Augustus succeeded him as head of the House of Saxe-Weimar-Eisenach.

Charles Augustus died at Schienen and was succeeded as head of the grand ducal house by his son, Michael.

== Marriage and issue ==
Charles Augustus was married at the Wartburg Castle on 5 October 1944 to Baroness Elisabeth of Wangenheim-Winterstein (Tübingen, 16 January 1912 – Munich, 15 March 2010), daughter of Othmar Baron von Wangenheim-Winterstein and wife, Baroness Maud von Trützschler. They had three children:

- Princess Elisabeth of Saxe-Weimar-Eisenach (b. 22 July 1945). She married Mindert Diderik de Kant on 10 July 1981 and they were divorced in 1983.
- Michael, Prince of Saxe-Weimar-Eisenach (b. 15 November 1946). He married Renate Henkel (daughter of Konrad Henkel) on 4 July 1970 and they were divorced in 1974. He remarried Dagmar Hennings (b. 24 June 1948) on 15 November 1980. They have one daughter:
  - Princess Leonie of Saxe-Weimar-Eisenach (b. 30 October 1986)
- Princess Beatrice-Maria of Saxe-Weimar-Eisenach (b. 11 March 1948). She married Martin Davidson on 9 December 1977. They have one daughter.

== Ancestry ==
Ancestors of Charles Augustus, Hereditary Grand Duke of Saxe-Weimar-Eisenach (1912–1988)

8. Karl Alexander, Grand Duke of Saxe-Weimar-Eisenach
4. Charles Augustus, Hereditary Grand Duke of Saxe-Weimar-Eisenach
9. Princess Sophie of the Netherlands
2. William Ernest, Grand Duke of Saxe-Weimar-Eisenach
10. Prince Hermann of Saxe-Weimar-Eisenach
5. Princess Pauline of Saxe-Weimar-Eisenach
11. Princess Augusta of Württemberg
1. Charles Augustus, Hereditary Grand Duke of Saxe-Weimar-Eisenach
12. Georg II, Duke of Saxe-Meiningen
6. Prince Frederick John of Saxe-Meiningen
13. Princess Feodora of Hohenlohe-Langenburg
3. Princess Feodora of Saxe-Meiningen
14. Ernest II, Count of Lippe-Biesterfeld
7. Countess Adelaide of Lippe-Biesterfeld
15. Countess Karoline von Wartensleben

Charles Augustus, Hereditary Grand Duke of Saxe-Weimar-Eisenach (1912–1988) House of Saxe-Weimar-Eisenach Born: 28 July 1912 Died: 14 October 1988
Titles in pretence
Preceded by Wilhelm Ernst	— TITULAR — Grand Duke of Saxe-Weimar-Eisenach; 1923–1988; Reason for succession failure: Grand Duchy abolished in 1918	Succeeded by Prince Michael
Preceded by Wilhelm Ernst	Head of the House of Wettin; 24 April 1923 - 14 October 1988	Succeeded by Prince Michael
