= Checkout.com =

Financial technology company

Checkout Ltd.
- Formerly: Opus Payments
- Type: Private
- Founded: 2009; 17 years ago (Rebranded in 2012)
- Founder: Guillaume Pousaz
- Headquarters: London, United Kingdom
- Key people: Guillaume Pousaz (CEO)
- Products: Financial services
- Website: checkout.com

Checkout.com (legally incorporated as Checkout Ltd.) is a financial technology company headquartered in London, United Kingdom. It provides payment processing services, operating as a payment gateway, acquirer, and processor for enterprise clients in sectors such as e-commerce, technology, and media. In 2022, It had a valuation of $40 billion making it the most valuable European fintech startup. Its clients include Netflix, eBay, Klarna, DocuSign, Uber Eats, Pinterest, Vinted, and ASOS.

In December 2022, Checkout.com reduced its internal 409A valuation to $11 billion, down from its $40 billion peak, allowing employee stock options to be re-struck at a lower price. By 2023 the internal valuation had been further adjusted to $9.35 billion. In September 2025, the company initiated an employee share buyback programme at a $12 billion valuation, representing a 30% increase from the 2023 figure. The company reported reaching profitability by the end of 2024 and employed 2,000 people across 19 offices globally.

== History ==
Checkout.com was founded in 2009 as Opus Payments (rebranded as Checkout.com in 2012) by Swiss national Guillaume Pousaz in Singapore as an authorized payment institution.

In 2013, Checkout.com became a member of Visa and Mastercard, and later developed partnerships with alternative payment providers, including Alipay and WeChat.

In 2014, it became the principal member of Union Pay, Diners, and Discover. In 2015, it became the global acquirer of American Express. The company launched a proprietary authorization and clearing platform in 2016. In 2017, it became a member of JCB and an authorized electronic money institution (EMI) in the UK.

In 2018, the company joined London & Partners' Mayor's International Business Programme. In 2019, the company received a $230 million Series A funding round led by Insight Partners and DST Global. After additional funding rounds, the company's valuation increased to $15 billion by June 2020. It raised $150 million in a Series B funding round to support its U.S. expansion and the acquisitions of ProcessOut In May 2020, it acquired Australian company Pin Payments, to expand into the Australian and New Zealand markets.

In 2021, it raised $450 million in a Series C funding round, acquired software development firm Icefire and launched Payouts to cards and bank accounts.

In January 2022, the company announced a $1 billion funding round, surpassing the value of competitors such as Revolut and Wise at a $40 billion evaluation. Investors included the Qatar Investment Authority and Tiger Global Management, Altimeter, Dragoneer, Franklin Templeton, GIC, and the Oxford Endowment Fund. The company achieved profitability in 2024 with 45% revenue growth in its core business segments. The company has stated targets of 30% growth for 2025 while maintaining profitability. The company used the capital to invest in Web3 applications. In May 2022, Checkout.com acquired French startup Ubble, which provides a remote identity verification service.

In 2023, Checkout.com received processing certification in Saudi Arabia and attained principal membership status in Japan and the UAE. The company also introduced Issuing and Intelligent Acceptance products.

In 2024, Checkout.com partnered with the Merchant Risk Council (MRC) to offer educational resources on payment fraud. Additionally that year, it also became a direct acquirer in Japan and launched several additional products, including Standalone Vault, Forward API, and Flow. It also launched Payouts, allowing merchants to transact globally.

In 2025, Checkout.com opened an office in San Francisco and launched direct acquiring capabilities in ⁣⁣Canada⁣⁣.[36]⁣ In October 2026, Checkout.com expanded from online payment processing into in-person point-of-sale payments through a partnership with European payments provider Mollie, launching initially in the United Kingdom and the European Economic Area ahead of a planned rollout in the United States.

== Partnership and clients ==
Checkout.com provides payment processing infrastructure to several global companies, including Netflix, Pinterest, Vinted, Temu, Uber Eats, DocuSign, ASOS, Majid Al Futtaim, Grab, Alipay, Alibaba, Shein, and Sony. In 2025, the company entered an agreement with eBay to support its payment infrastructure. It was also reported to be involved in Mastercard's Agent Pay initiative and announced plans to integrate Visa’s Intelligent Commerce API.

== Technology and products ==
Checkout.com is a global digital payment service provider offering a suite of products and services to support online transactions, it includes:

=== Flow ===
Flow is a customizable payment user interface that can be embedded directly into websites to support online payments.

=== Issuing ===
Merchants can launch physical and virtual cards using Checkout.com issuing platform.

=== IDV ===
IDV (i.e. Identity Verification, former Ubble team) is a video identity verification tool that utilizes artificial intelligence to verify user identities, aiming to enhance security during digital onboarding processes. Checkout.com recently announced the launch of Face Authentication to strengthen its existing IDV product.

=== Fraud Detection Pro ===
This product uses machine learning to identify and prevent potentially fraudulent transactions in real time, allowing for rule customization based on user needs.

=== Intelligent Acceptance ===
Intelligent Acceptance is an AI-driven system that adjusts transaction processing methods, including data handling, routing, and authentication, to improve transaction approval rates and reduce processing costs. This tool has supported merchants in generating over $10 billion in revenue.

=== Checkout Business Account ===
The Checkout Business Account is a multi-currency account designed to allow businesses to hold, manage, and transfer funds. It aims to support liquidity and cash flow management for merchants.
