= Conundrum Hot Springs =

Thermal springs

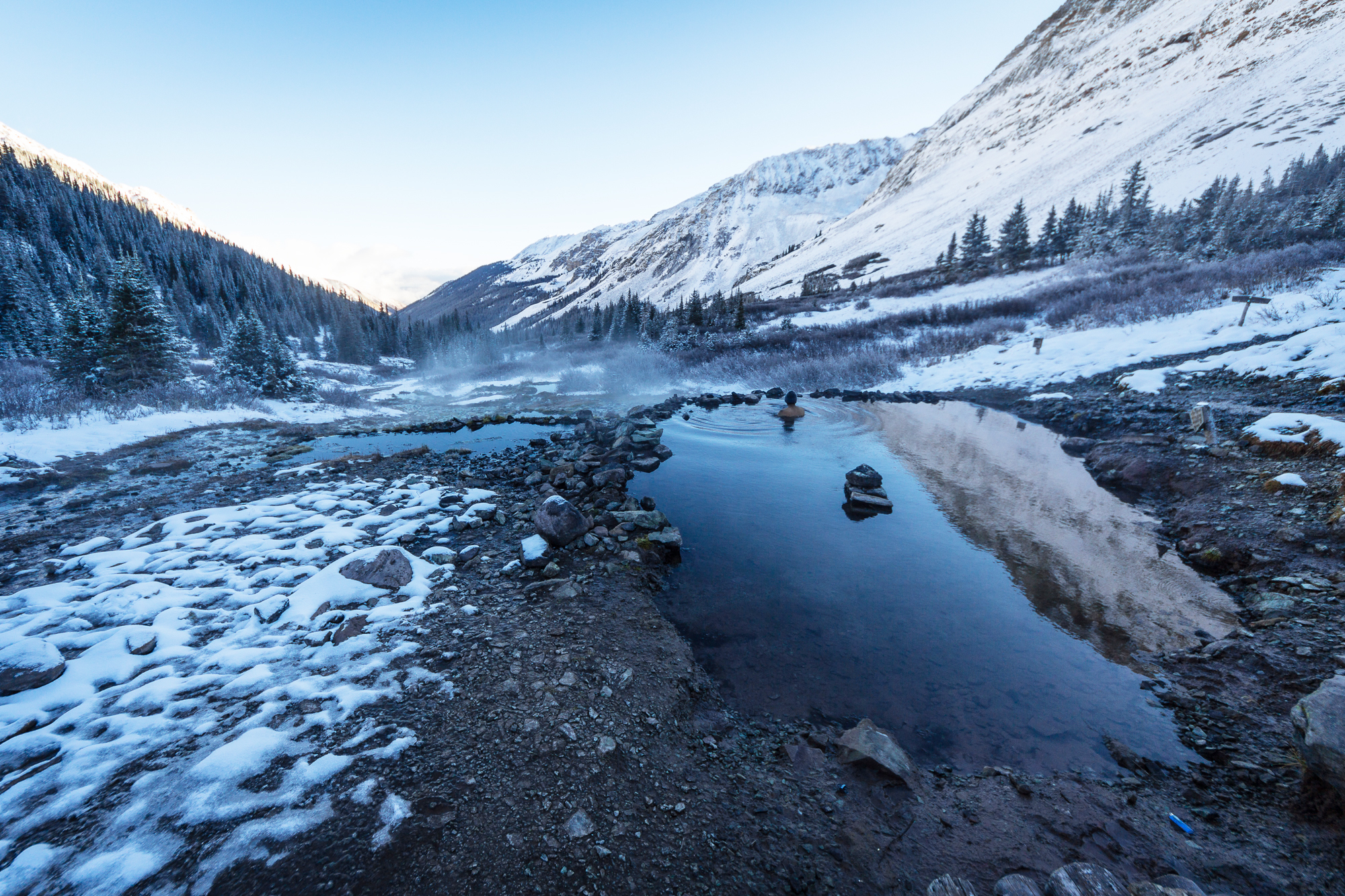
- Interactive map of Conundrum Hot Springs
- Location: Wilderness area of White River National Forest
- Coordinates: 39.0120°N 106.8910°W
- Elevation: 11,207 feet (3,416 m)
- Type: geothermal
- Temperature: 120 °F (49 °C)

Conundrum Hot Springs is a geothermal spring in a remote section of the Maroon Bells-Snowmass Wilderness area of the White River National Forest in Colorado Rocky Mountains.

== Description ==
The hot mineral water collects in existing craters as well as several primitive rock-lined soaking pools that have been dug out nearby. The hot spring water is channeled into two main soaking pools via a hand-built rock-lined waterway. The larger soaking pool is 15 feet (4.6 m) in diameter and approximately 4.5 feet (1.4 m) deep. The water temperature in the large soaking pool is approximately 98 °F (37 °C). There is no camping allowed at the springs.

Conundrum hot springs are among the highest in altitude in the United States. The springs are located in a scenic setting, with views of mountains, avalanche chutes and waterfalls. The larger soaking pools can fit ten or more people.

In recent years there have been problems at the springs with human feces being left by hikers, campers and spring users which can contaminate the water with pathogens. The forest service is asking that people pack it out on their return hike. Dogs are not allowed within 2.5 miles (4.0 km) of the hot spring site, and all waste, including feces must be packed out.

== Location ==
The springs are an 8.5-mile (13.7 km) hike from the Conundrum Creek trailhead, located approximately ten minutes from Aspen by car. The site is surrounded by 14,000-foot (4,300 m) mountains, and is located above the tree line. The weather can change rapidly in the area. The hike involves a gain of 2,500 feet (760 m) to 11,207 feet (3,416 m) elevation.

== Water profile ==
The hot mineral water emerges from the ground at 122 °F. The temperature of the soaking pools are approximately 98 °F. The water is air cooled while flowing through the rock-lined channels before reaching the soaking pools.

== See also ==
- List of hot springs in the United States
- List of hot springs in the world
