= Wiesbaden Hot Springs =

Thermal springs

- Mother Buchannan Bath House
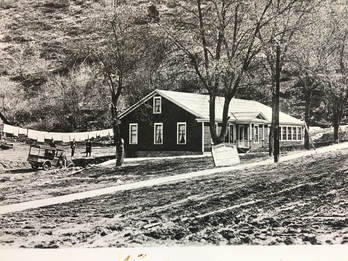
- Original bathhouse building from 1879

- Location within Colorado
- Interactive map of Wiesbaden Hot Springs
- Location: Ouray, Colorado
- Coordinates: 38°1′24″N 107°40′6″W
- Elevation: 7,760 feet (2,370 m)
- Type: Geothermal
- Discharge: 2 and 30 US gal/min (7.6 and 113.6 L/min; 1.7 and 25.0 imp gal/min)
- Temperature: 118 °F (48 °C)

Wiesbaden Hot Springs is a group of three thermal springs and a vapor cave in Ouray, Colorado. The spring water flows from the source at 118 °F (48 °C) and is cooled to between 99 and 108 °F (37 and 42 °C) in the soaking pools.

== History ==
The hot springs were first used by the indigenous Colorado Ute peoples. Chief Ouray of the Tabeguache (Uncompahgre) band of the Ute tribe, built an adobe home at the hot springs. The ruins of this structure were found in an archaeological study. There he held meetings, over a period of 20 years, with tribal leaders from seven Ute bands and with officers of the U.S. government. The purpose of these meetings was to negotiate a permanent home for the Ute people. However, in 1881 approximately 1,200 Utes were removed at gunpoint.

In the mid-1800s gold miners happened upon the vapor cave in their excavations. In 1879, the wood-framed Mother Buchanan Bath House opened as a commercial enterprise catering to miners. In the 1890s the missionary James Joseph Gibbons stayed at Mother Bucannon's Bath House and wrote that Mrs. Bucannon came from Donegal, Ireland. Her husband, known as The General, was considered openhearted.

In 1902, a small bathhouse was built by A.J. Dunbarton. In the 1920s, a doctor, C.V. Bates, enlarged the vapor cave and opened the Bates Hospital and Sanatorium at the site. The current Historic Wiesbaden Hot Springs Spa & Lodgings is the oldest commercial hot spring establishment in Ouray.

== Water profile ==
The hot mineral water emerges from the ground at 118 °F (48 °C). Of the three main sources, each liter of water from Spring A contains 910 milligrams (14.0 gr) of dissolved mineral solids. Spring B, located at the rear of the vapor cave contains 410 milligrams per liter (29 gr/imp gal), and Spring C contains 800 milligrams per liter (56 gr/imp gal). The dissolved solids are mostly of the calcium-sulfate variety. The discharge rates of the springs are between 2 and 30 US gallons per minute (7.6 and 113.6 L/min; 1.7 and 25.0 imp gal/min).

== See also ==
List of hot springs in the United States
