= Jost Henkel =

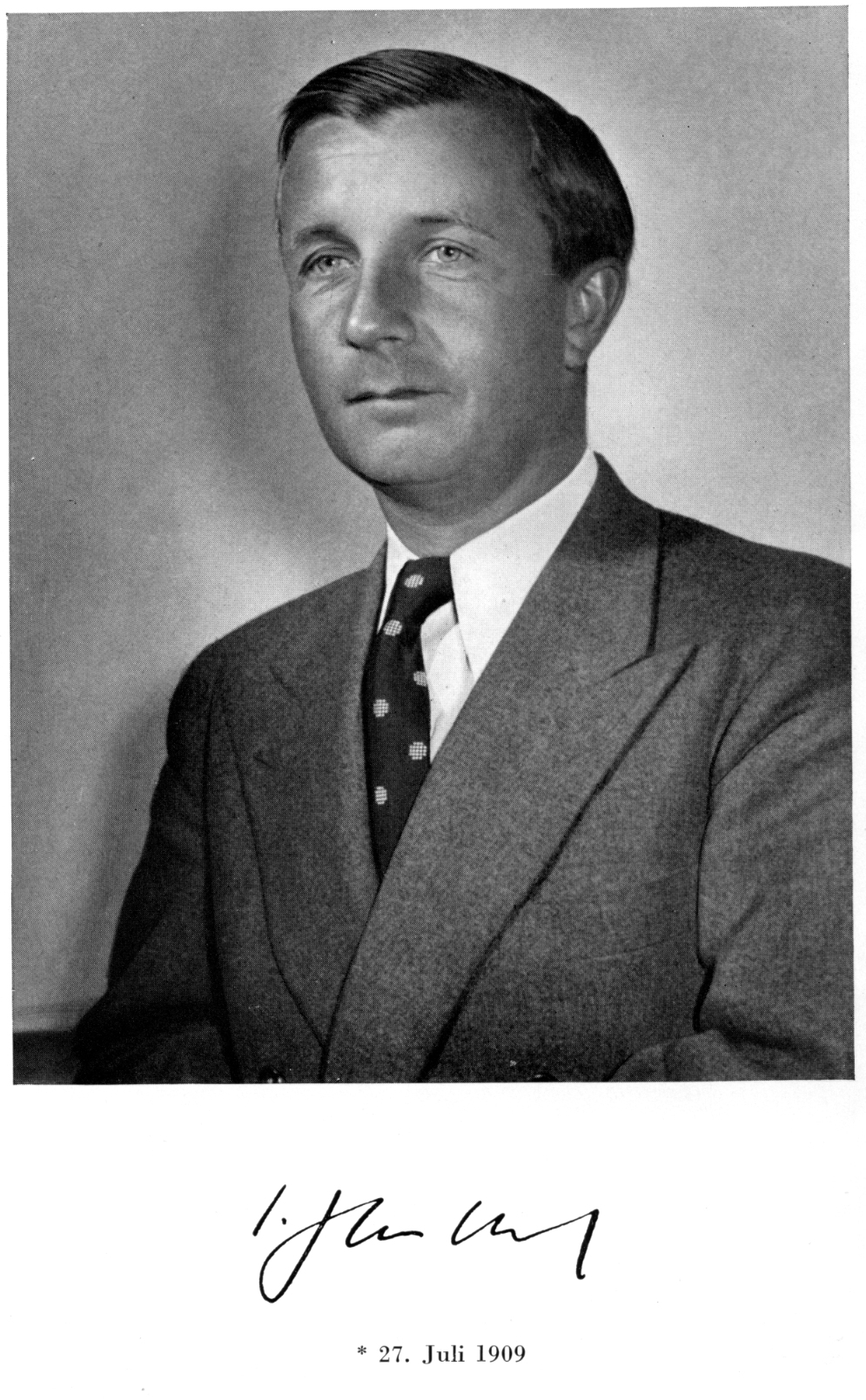
Jost Henkel (1950)

Karl Jost Henkel (1909 - 1961) was a German entrepreneur and grandson of Fritz Henkel. He headed the Henkel Group from 1938 until his death.

== Life ==
Henkel was born on 27 July 1909 in Dusseldorf, then in the German Empire.

After graduating from Rethel Gymnasium in Düsseldorf in 1928, Henkel completed a commercial apprenticeship in Bremen from 1928 to 1930. From 1930 to 1932, he studied economics at the universities of Bonn, Berlin and Hamburg, graduating with a diploma. From 1932 to 1934, he received his doctorate from the University of Cologne. At the same time, from 1933 to 1934, he worked in the field service of the Henkel company. This was followed by studies in the US from 1934 to 1935.

Jost Henkel joined the Industrie-Club Düsseldorf in 1938. He was later appointed Wehrwirtschaftsführer in the National Socialist German Reich.

From 1938, he became managing director of the company together with Carl August Bagel and Werner Lüps, and on 11 July 1942, he was elected "Betriebsführer der Henkel-Werke" as successor to the late Werner Lüps. In 1945, Jost Henkel was imprisoned by the Allies and returned to the company together with other family members in November 1947. In December 1947, he was appointed ordinary managing director.

In 1950 he became a full managing director. In 1958, he established the Dr. Jost Henkel Foundation. In 1959, he became Chairman of the Supervisory Board and a member of the Advisory Board of Henkel & Cie GmbH.

From 1959, he was active in the German Chemical Industry Association. There, he took on board duties and was a member of the Main Committee and the Presidial Committee.

Henkel had played tennis in his youth and in 1937, he became Chairman of the Düsseldorf Rochus Club. From 1949 to 1953, he was Chairman of the Tennis Association of the Lower Rhine, and from 1952 to 1958, he was President of the German Tennis Federation.

Henkel died of pneumonia in 1961 at the age of 51. After his death, his younger brother Konrad took over the management of the Henkel Group.

He died on 7 July 1961 in Duseldof.

== Awards ==
In 1958, Henkel was awarded the Grand Federal Cross of Merit for his services. The city of Berlin awarded him as the first industrialist, the Berlin Liberty Bell for his services to the city.
