= Dunton, Colorado =

Unincorporated community in Dolores County, Colorado, United States

- Unincorporated community
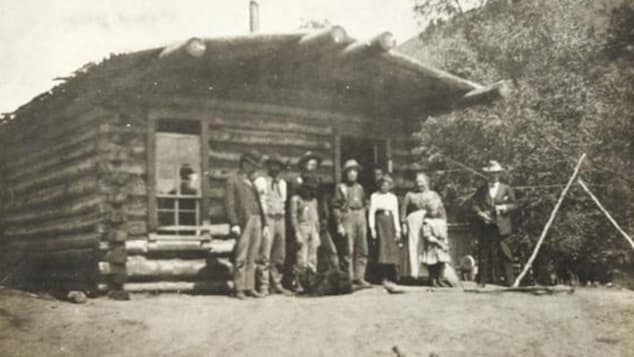
- Dunton Hot Springs cabin, c. 1880s

- Location of Dunton, Colorado. Dunton (Colorado)
- Coordinates: 37°46′22″N 108°05′38″W
- Country: United States
- State: Colorado
- County: Dolores

Government
  - Type: unincorporated community
  - Body: Dolores County
- Elevation: 8,855 ft (2,699 m)
- Time zone: UTC−07:00 (MST)
  - Summer (DST): UTC−06:00 (MDT)
- ZIP code: 81323 (Dolores)
- Area codes: 970/748
- GNIS place ID: 176594

Dunton is an unincorporated community located in and governed by Dolores County, Colorado, United States. Dunton is adjacent to the Dunton Hot Springs.

== History ==
In 1885, Dunton Hot Springs was a homestead that was settled by Horatio Dunton, a miner. The area was attractive to miners due to the mineral-rich geology, and the hot springs in the area. The Smuggler, Emma, and American mines were located nearby. The Dunton, Colorado, post office operated from August 9, 1892, until November 30, 1954. The Dolores, Colorado, post office (ZIP code 81323) now serves the area. At the peak of its population, 500 people lived in Dunton.

In the 1890s, Dunton Hot Springs attracted gold miners, trappers and prostitutes. In 1895, Joe and Dominica Roscio founded the town and established a dude ranch there, Rancho Dolores. The Roscio's converted a saloon into a bathhouse for miners.

In 1905, Dunton had a population between 260 and 300.

In the 1970s, the Roscio family sold the property to Stephen Wendell. In the 70s and 80s, the hot springs attracted travelers, hippies, bikers, musicians and poets who camped in cabins during the summer. The rent for a cabin at the time was a dollar or two per week. During this time, a dude ranch was in operation. Over time, traditional visitors gave way to a demographic who bathed in the hot springs nude.

In 1980, Stephen Wendell sold the property to investors from New York.

By 1990, the settlement became a ghost town again. In 1994, Christoph Henkel, a German art dealer bought the town, he and a group of German investors developed the site into a resort in the 1990s. In 1987, rooms in the lodge or cabins with hot springs access was $15 per night per person. In 2005, cabins were renting for $600 to $800 per night; by 2018 cabins were renting between $630 and $2,100 per night effectively limiting access to most people other than the wealthy.

== Geography ==
Dunton is located in Dolores County. The Dunton Hot Springs lie about 500 feet (150 m) southeast of the community.

== See also ==
- List of ghost towns in Colorado
- List of hot springs in the United States
