= Penny Hot Springs =

Thermal spring

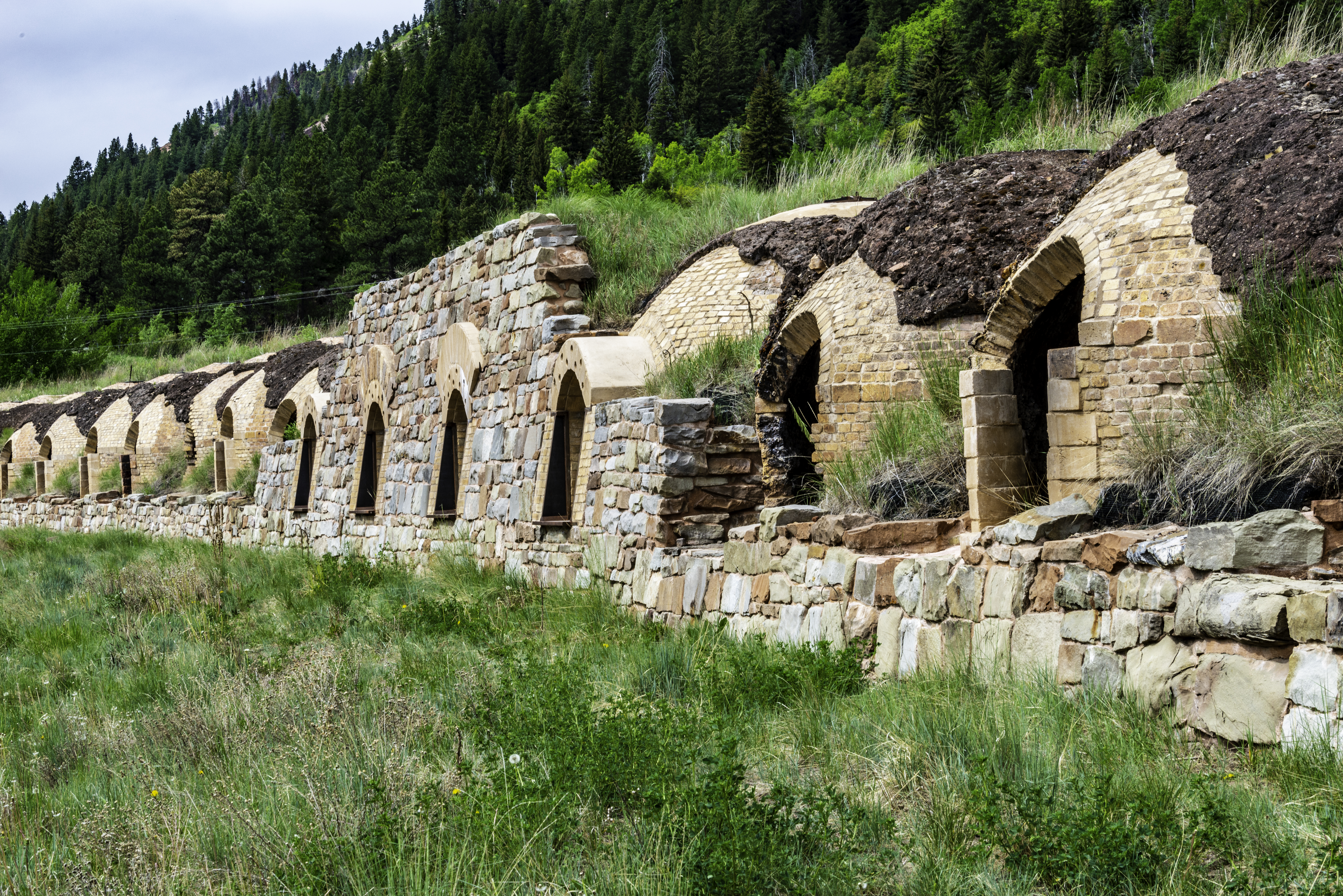
- Old Coke Ovens in the historic district of Redstone near the Penny Hot Springs

- Location within Colorado
- Interactive map of Penny Hot Springs
- Location: near Redstone, Colorado
- Coordinates: 39°13′37.2″N 107°13′26.4″W
- Elevation: 8,000 ft (2,400 m)
- Type: geothermal
- Temperature: 133 °F (56 °C)

Penny Hot Springs is a geothermal spring located near the historic mining town of Redstone, Colorado.

== Water profile ==
The hot mineral water emerges from the spring at 133 °F/56 °C, at the foot of granite cliffs called "Hell's Gates". It flows into half-a-dozen collecting pools at the edge of Crystal River, the largest of which is 20 feet in diameter by 2 feet deep. The primitive soaking pools are made from river stones, and are maintained between seasons by volunteers. Cold river water can be mixed with hot water by rearranging the rocks surrounding the soaking pools.

== History ==
Local Native Americans originally used the springs for generations. The springs are named for Daniel Penny, a local hotelier who ran a historical bathhouse and small hotel and bathhouse near the Avalanch Creek railroad line stop. In the 1960s skinny dippers began using the springs which the locals objected to, in protest they bulldozed the bathhouse. The spring was restored in the early 1990s, after the land was acquired by Pitkin County.

During the COVID-19 crisis, the springs were closed and policed due to mass gatherings of bathers of over 10 individuals.

== See also ==
- List of hot springs in the United States
- List of hot springs in the world
