= Trimble, Colorado =

Unincorporated community in La Plata County, CO, USA

Coordinates: 37°23′25″N 107°50′47″W

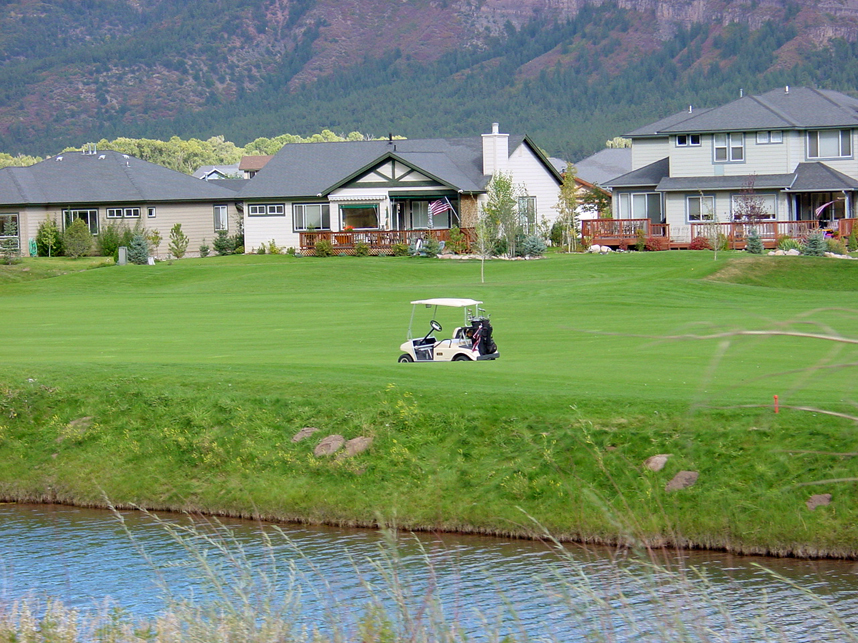
Golf course in Trimble, September 2001

Trimble is an unincorporated community on the Animas River in La Plata County, in the U.S. state of Colorado.

== History ==
A post office called Trimble was established in 1883, and remained in operation until 1900. The community was named after Frank Trimble, a local cattleman.
