= Joerg Henkel =

German engineer

Joerg Henkel is an engineer at the Karlsruhe Institute of Technology, Germany. He was named a Fellow of the Institute of Electrical and Electronics Engineers (IEEE) in 2015 for his contributions to hardware and software codesign of embedded computing systems.
