= Karl Janssen =

German sculptor

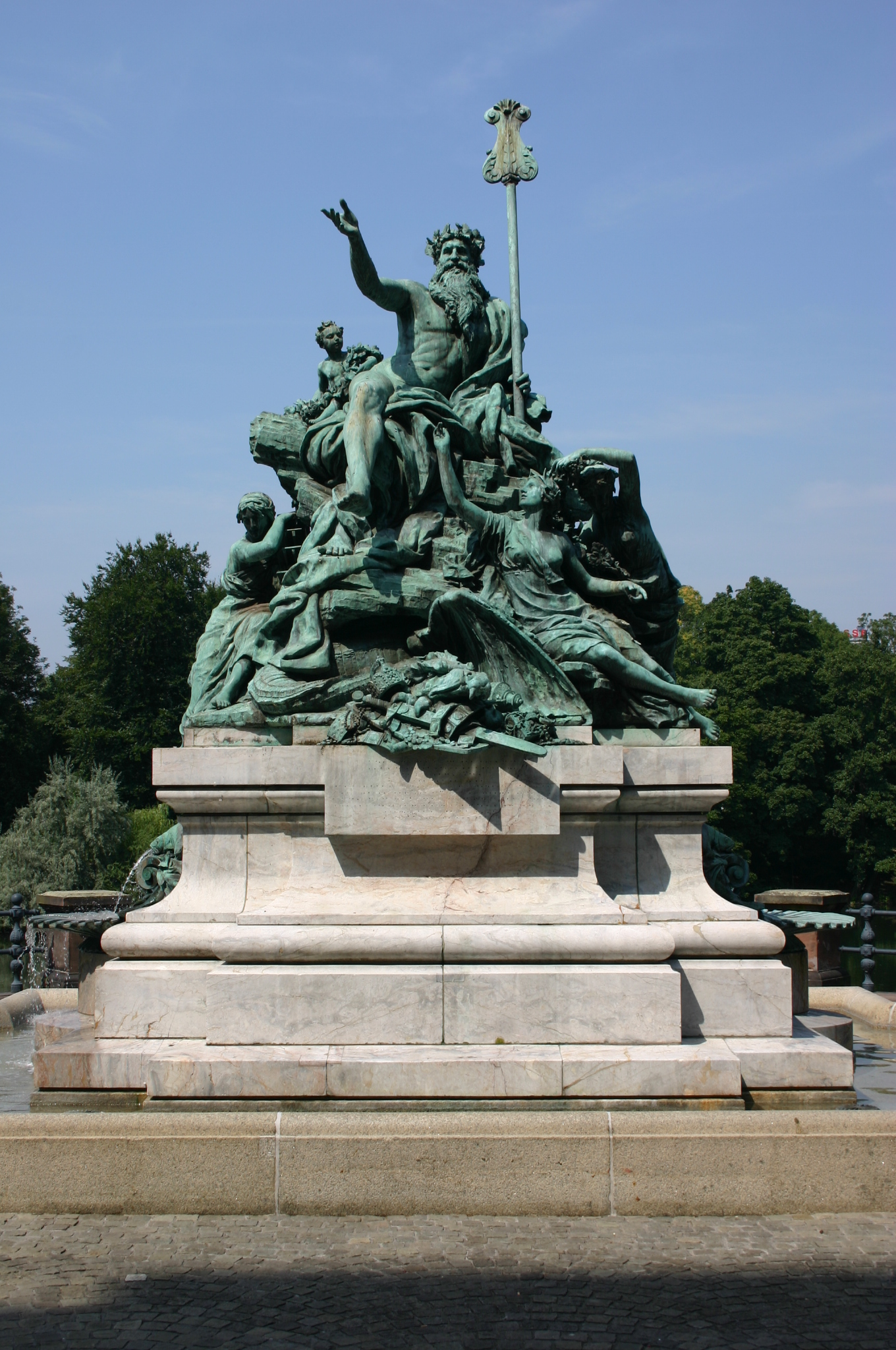
Father Rhine and his Daughters, bronze fountain, (1884) 1897 (Düsseldorf)

Karl Janssen (29 May 1855 – 2 December 1927) was a German sculptor working in the Baroque revival tradition; he was born and died in Düsseldorf.

== Biography ==
Born in a family of artists, his father Theodor Janssen was an engraver and his brother Peter Janssen was a painter. He studied at the Königlich Preußischen Kunstakademie in Düsseldorf from 1872 to 1880. In 1878 he garnered a scholarship to study in Rome; he remained in Italy from 1881 to 1884. On his return his first notable commission was for a memorial portrait bust of the industrialist Poensgen (1883) for his monument in the Nordfriedhof.

In 1897, together with Josef Tüshaus, whom he had known from their days at the Akademie, he was commissioned to produce a sculptured group for the visit to the city by Kaiser Wilhelm, on the theme of Father Rhine and his Daughters. The result so pleased Düsseldorfers that Janssen and Tüshaus were requested to cast a more durable version in bronze, for a city fountain. The previous year (1896), he cast an equestrian statue of the Kaiser, which was destroyed in the Second World War.

Since 1893 he had been teaching as a professor, taking the chair of the late August Wittig, who had been his teacher. Among his outstanding pupils were Bernhard Hoetger and Wilhelm Lehmbruck.

Following the First World War he was commissioned by the Henkel company to sculpt a war memorial to fallen Henkel workers, to be erected at the Henkel works in Düsseldorf-Holthausen. His last well-known work was also for the Henkel family, a mourning figure in Art Deco style for the family mausoleum (1925).
