= Konrad Henkel =

German chemist and industrialist

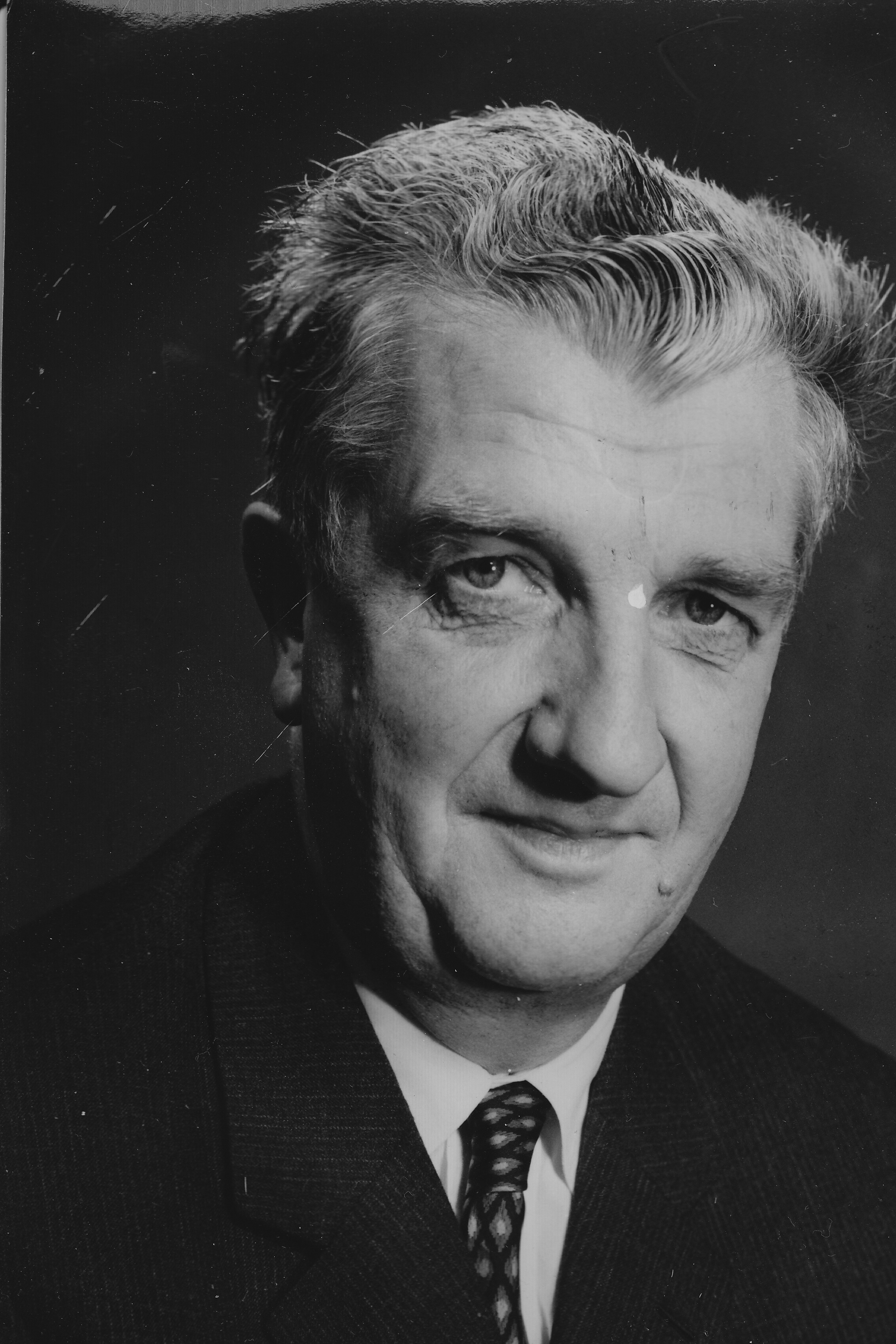
Konrad Henkel (1975)

Konrad Henkel (25 October 1915 - 24 April 1999) was a German chemist and industrialist, and long-time head of the Henkel Group.

== Life ==
Konrad Henkel was born in 1915, the grandson of Fritz Henkel (1848-1930), founder of the detergent factory Henkel & Cie in Aachen in 1876 moved in 1878 to Düsseldorf. Henkel was the second son of Hugo Henkel and Gerda Henkel. He graduated from high school in Düsseldorf and then studied chemistry at the Technical University of Munich. He then transferred to the Technical University of Braunschweig and later to the Technical University of Karlsruhe, where he received his doctorate in 1939.

Between 1939 and 1945, he worked at the then Kaiser Wilhelm Institute for Medical Research in Heidelberg, where he conducted research on poison gases under the supervision of Richard Kuhn (co-discoverer of Soman and a notable Nazi collaborator). In 1948, he joined Henkel as a chemist in product development. From 1949 to 1956, Konrad Henkel was Head of Product Development at Henkel and finally became a member of the management board in 1956.

After the early death of his brother Jost in 1961, Konrad Henkel became chairman of the management board of the company, which he then transferred to a KGaA in 1975. In 1980, Konrad Henkel retired from corporate management and moved to the supervisory board, which he chaired between 1980 and 1990. He handed over the chairmanship of the management board to Prof. Dr. Helmut Sihler, the first non-family manager to head the company. Between 1976 and 1990, Konrad Henkel was also Chairman of the Shareholders' Committee of Henkel KGaA, and from 1990 to 1999 Honorary Chairman of the Henkel Group. His time as Chairman of the Shareholders' Committee and the supervisory board coincided with the Companies IPO in 1985. Konrad Henkel died in his home town of Düsseldorf in 1999 at the age of 83.

From 1972 to 1973, Henkel was President of the German Chemical Industry Association (VCI), from 1967 to 1990 Chairman of the Industrie-Club Düsseldorf, and from 1982 to 1991 Chairman of the supervisory board of Degussa AG.

== Controversy ==
Konrad Henkel was involved in a party donation scandal in the 1980s. He was accused of having donated 4.22 million Marks to the CDU/CSU and FDP, therefore evading 1.896 million Marks in taxes. The Bonn public prosecutors office issued a fine for 3.5 million Marks, which Henkel contradicted. As a result, legal proceedings were initiated against him at the end of 1988. These proceedings were discontinued in January 1990 due to formal errors in the original fine.

== Awards ==
Henkel received many awards, including honorary citizenship of the state capital of Düsseldorf in 1976, the Grand Decoration of Honor in Gold for Services to the Republic of Austria in 1978, the Grand Cross of Merit in 1980, the Wilhelm Normann Medal of the German Society for Fat Science in 1985, and the Grand Cross of Merit with Star in 1995. The AudiMax of Heinrich Heine University in Düsseldorf is named after him. In 1986, the Konrad-Henkel Foundation was established.

Henkel had three daughters Andrea, Renate and Karin from his first marriage and a son, Christoph Henkel with his second wife Gabriele Henkel (1955), who inherited his shares in the company.
