= Friedrich Karl Henkel =

German entrepreneur and founder of the Henkel Group

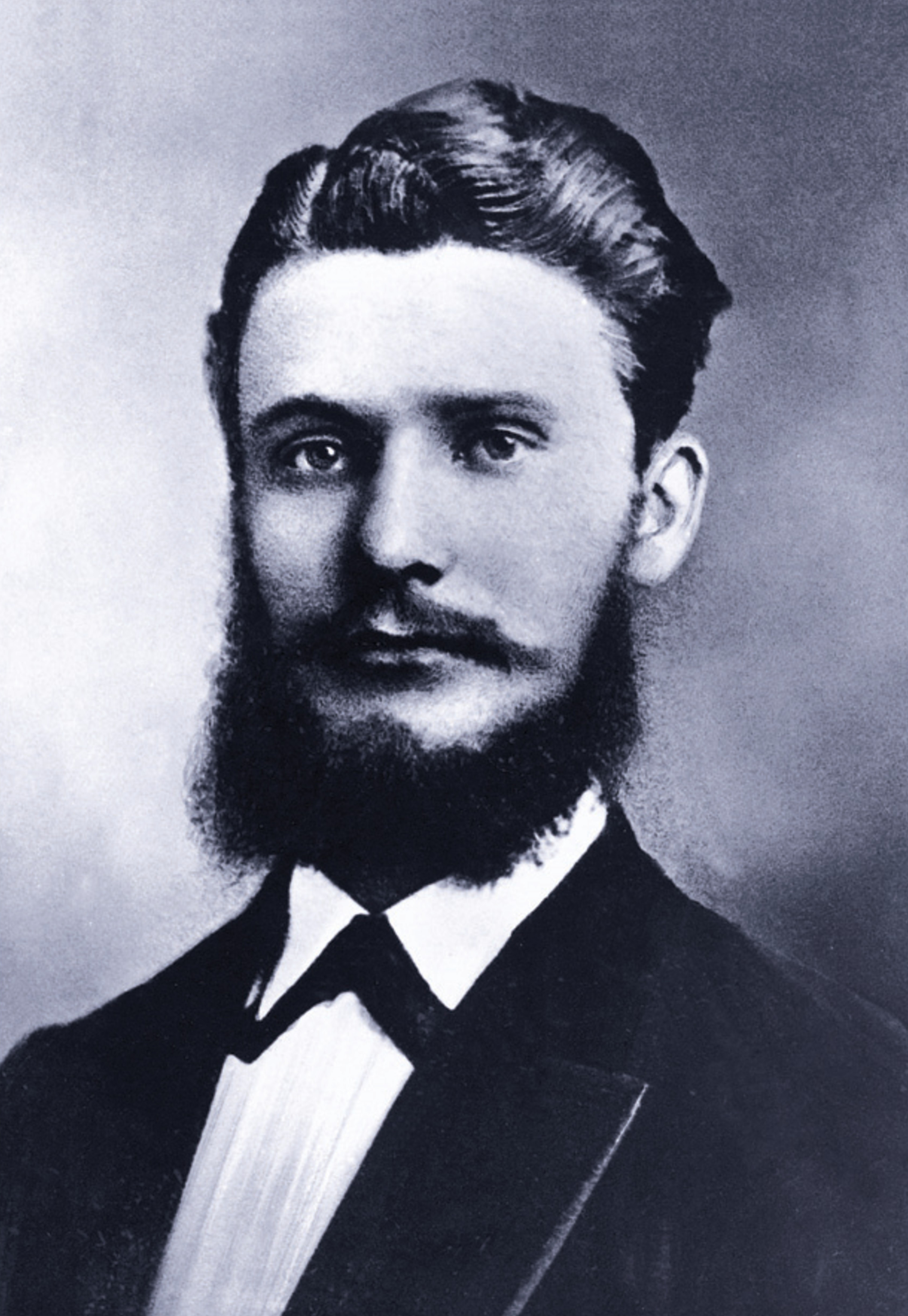
Fritz Henkel (1876)

Friedrich ("Fritz") Karl Henkel (* March 20, 1848 in Vöhl; † March 1, 1930 in Rengsdorf) was a German entrepreneur and founder of the Henkel Group.

== Early life ==
Fritz Henkel was born as the fifth child of his parents, the teacher Johann Jost Henkel (1809-1874) from Wallau an der Lahn and his wife Johanette Philippine (1807-1881), born Jüngst. At the age of seventeen, he moved to Elberfeld, where he began an apprenticeship at the Gessert brothers paint and varnish factory. After finishing his apprenticeship he worked his way up to become the company's procurator (authorized agent).

== Career ==
In 1874, at the age of 26, Henkel became a partner in the chemicals and paints wholesaler "Henkel und Strebel". On 26 September 1876, he founded the detergent factory "Henkel & Cie" in Aachen together with the owners of the Rheinische Wasserglasfabrik "Scheffen und Dicker". After Scheffen and Dicker left the company, Henkel took sole responsibility.

Two years after its foundation, he moved the companies headquarters to Düsseldorf, where he rented an empty soap factory. In 1880, construction work finally began on a new company building in Düsseldorf-Flingern. Under his management the company achieved a turnover of over one million marks in 1899. In 1899, Henkel moved its headquarters to Düsseldorf-Holthausen, where four building complexes and the Fritz Henkel residence were constructed by the end of 1900.

In 1911, the year in which he was appointed Royal Prussian Counselor of Commerce, Henkel moved to Rengsdorf in the Westerwald region, where he built a spacious country house ("Haus Henkel") as a retirement home. He also built in Rengsdorf a guest house that served as a recreation home for employees of the company; he supported the community in many ways.

On the occasion of his 50th anniversary as a businessman in 1915, Fritz Henkel founded the "Support Fund for Workers and Salaried Employees"; which was followed in 1918, on his 70th birthday, with the "Old-age and Survivors' Pension Fund for Salaried Employees" (Pensionskasse).

== Family ==
On 4 October 1873, Henkel married Elisabeth von den Steinen in Elberfeld (* January 23, 1852 in Elberfeld; † November 5, 1904 in Düsseldorf), a daughter of August von den Steinen and Alwine, born Schlieper. The couple had four children:

- August (* 8 July 1874 in Aachen; † 8 June 1879 in Vöhl) died at the age of four
- Fritz (* 25 July 1875 in Aachen; † 4 January 1930 in Unkel) died two months before his father
- Hugo (Wilhelm) (* 21 January 1881 in Düsseldorf; † 18 December 1952 in Hösel)
- Emmy Anna (* 8 September 1884 in Düsseldorf; † 19 September 1941 in Düsseldorf)

On 1 March 1930, Fritz Henkel died at the age of 81 after a short, serious illness at his country residence in Rengsdorf. He was buried at the North Cemetery in Düsseldorf in the family tomb. The tomb is a pavilion-like, open-fronted rotunda of shell limestone with a glazed dome, which is reminiscent of a Greek temple of the Monopteros type, was built around 1925 by the architect Walter Furthmann. The tomb's female figure in white marble is a neoclassical late work by the sculptor Karl Janssen, who died in 1927. He was the father of Gerda Henkel-Janssen (1888-1966), the wife of industrialist Hugo Henkel.

After Fritz Henkel's death, his youngest son Hugo Henkel took over the sole management of the company.

In memory of his wife Gerda, the Gerda Henkel Foundation was established in 1976 to promote science.

== Awards and honors ==
- 1 July 1911: Royal Prussian Council of Commerce
- 1925/1926: Honorary citizens of Vöhl, Wallau (Lahn), Rengsdorf and Benrath
- 27 April 1928: Honorary citizen of Düsseldorf, ceremony on 22 August
- The Fritz Henkel Hall and Fritz Henkel Street in Wallau were named after him. Fritz Henkel had donated 30,000 Reichsmarks to the Wallau community for the construction of the Fritz Henkel Hall
- "Henkelhaus" (1926) and "Henkelschule" (1955/56) in Vöhl. Fritz Henkel had supported the construction of the Henkel House with a donation.

== Sources ==
Carl Graf von Klinckowstroem: Henkel, Friedrich (Fritz) Karl. In: Neue Deutsche Biographie (NDB). Band 8, Duncker & Humblot, Berlin 1969, ISBN 3-428-00189-3, S. 527 f. (Digitalisat)
