= Christoph Henkel =

London-based German billionaire businessman

- Born: 11 February 1958 (age 68); Düsseldorf, West Germany
- Occupation: Businessman
- Spouse: Katrin Bellinger
- Children: 2
- Parent: Konrad Henkel
- Relatives: Friedrich Karl Henkel (grandfather)

Christoph Henkel (born 11 February 1958) is a London-based German billionaire businessman and entrepreneur. As of September 2021, his net worth is estimated at US$1.7 billion.

== Early life ==
Christoph Henkel was born on 11 February 1958 in Düsseldorf, West Germany.

Henkel's grandfather, Friedrich Karl Henkel, founded Henkel, a cleaning products company, in 1876. His father, Konrad Henkel, took over the company and turned it into a global corporation.

== Career ==
Henkel inherited a £1 billion stake in the German chemical company Henkel shortly after his father's death in 1999.

He is a co-founder and co-owner of Canyon Equity, headquartered in Larkspur, California. He is also the owner of Dunton Hot Springs resort in Dunton, Colorado, US.

In the Sunday Times Rich List 2022 ranking of the wealthiest people in the UK, he was placed 5th with an estimated family fortune of £15billion. He ranks #1,118 on the list of the richest people in the world and 71st in Germany.

He was a member of the Shareholders' Committee of Henkel from 1991 to 2022.

== Personal life ==
Henkel resides in London, England. He is married to Katrin Bellinger, an art dealer and collector, specialising in Old Master drawings. They have two sons.

He received an honorary doctorate from the University of Düsseldorf in 2007. He also sits on the advisory board of the G12++ certificate, a high school-equivalent certificate tailor-made for refugees by Alsama Project. Speaking about the G12++, he is quoted by Alsama as saying: 'this initiative resonates deeply with my belief that education can change lives, and I’m proud to be part of a project that truly makes a lasting difference.'
