= Leopold von Rauch =

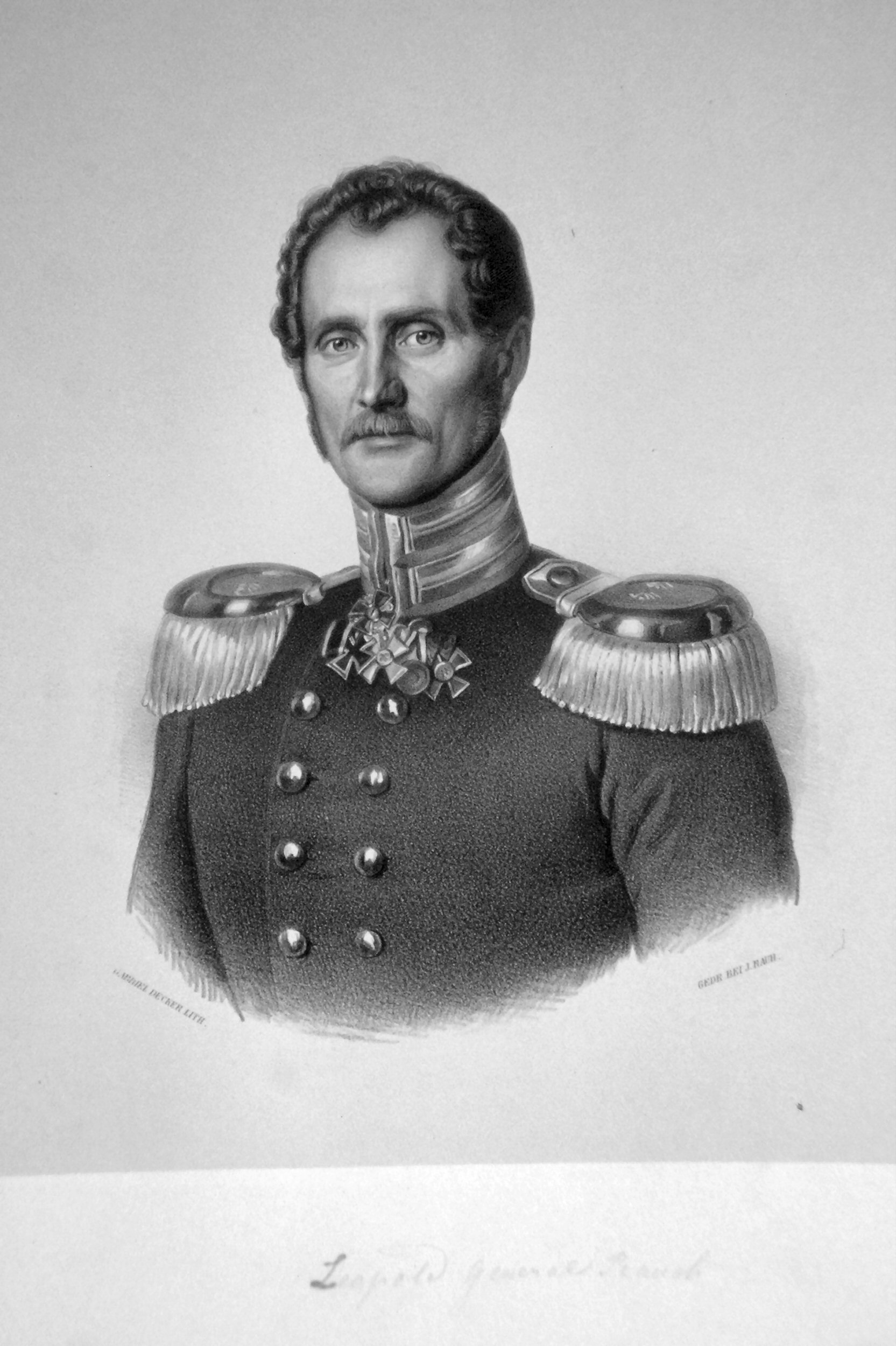
Major General Leopold von Rauch, lithograph by Gabriel Decker, c. 1850

Gustav Adolf Leopold von Rauch (27 February 1787 – 26 November 1860) was a major general in the Prussian Army.

== Life ==
He was born in Konigsberg, the eighth of twelve children born to major general Bonaventura von Rauch and his wife Johanna, née Bandel (1752–1828). His brothers included Gustav (future Minister for War, general of the infantry and honorary citizen of Berlin) and Friedrich Wilhelm (future military attache in St Petersburg, adjutant general to Frederick William IV of Prussia and lieutenant general). Leopold's sister Rosalie Gräfin von Hohenau, née von Rauch († 1879) married Prince Albert of Prussia (brother to King Frederick William IV and Emperor William I).

From 1799 to 1803 he trained as an army cadet in Stolp and Berlin. His first posting was as an ensign in Number 36 von Puttkammer Infantry Regiment, then based in Brandenburg an der Havel. He fought against France in the War of the Fourth Coalition in 1806 and 1807. After Prussia surrendered he came off the active list but remained a half-pay second lieutenant. In 1809 he was assigned to the Number 8 Lifeguard Infantry Regiment, newly raised in Berlin. Two years later he was promoted to adjutant and became the commander of the Normal Infantry Battalion, then attached to the Foot Guards Regiment in Potsdam. In 1813 he was promoted to first lieutenant and then staff captain. Whilst Prussia harried Napoleon's retreat from Russia in 1812 and 1813, he served as adjutant of the Guards Reserve Brigade, chief of the general staff of II Army Corps and adjutant to 1st Guards Brigade, winning the Iron Cross 2nd class.

In the Battle of Kulm in 1813 he was so badly wounded that he was taken off active service and remained in adjutant posts for the rest of his career. One of these posts was on the staff of Duke Charles of Mecklenburg, commander of the Guards Brigade and brother of King Frederick William III's queen consort Luise. Charles wrote of Rauch: "Equally active and capable. He has an excellent attitude in all his manners and is highly recommended." Rauch was made a major in 1819. He was transferred to the 2nd Foot Guards Regiment from 1822 to 1833 as court-major (Platzmajor) in Potsdam. In 1833 he was put in charge of the Allgemeine Kriegsschule in Berlin, which trained staff and general staff officers and later became the Prussian Staff College. He was made a lieutenant colonel in 1834, just before being made the Prussian commissioner for the Kalisch Review, a joint operation between Prussia and the Russian Empire in the Congress of Poland in 1835. At the end of the review he was awarded the Order of St Anna 2nd class. He was made colonel in 1836 and major general in 1842 before retiring in 1848. He died in Trzblitz twelve years after his retirement.

== Marriage and issue ==
On 20 February 1827 he married in Prague. His new wife was Amélie von Levetzow, from the Teschow-Koppelow family (6 February 1805, Leipzig – 1 October 1831, Potsdam). Her parents were Joachim Otto Ulrich von Levetzow (chamberlain and court-marshal in Mecklenburg-Schwerin and lord of the manors of Hohen-Mistorf and Teschow) and his first wife Amalie von Levetzow (née von Brösigke). The couple divorced and Amalie went on to marry Friedrich Carl Ulrich von Levetzow (killed in 1815 at the battle of Waterloo) and then Franz Graf von Klebelsberg-Thumburg, former president of the Vienna Hofkammer. Amélie had two sisters – the elder was Ulrike von Levetzow (who inspired Goethe to write his Marienbad Elegy) and the younger was Bertha (who bought the estate at Netluk (Pnětluky) to live near her mother and Ulrike). Goethe had contact with all three sisters and took part in Amélie's marriage.

The couple had two sons, Franz (13 March 1828, Potsdam – 8 August 1911, Netluk/Pnětluky) and Adalbert (20 August 1829, Potsdam – 18 February 1907, Ramholz). Both sons kept in close touch with their mother's sister Ulrike and after her death in 1899 ensured her correspondence with Goethe was kept intact and made available to the public. Franz grew up with Ulrike after his mother's early death and stayed there until he was 18 and remained in correspondence with her long afterwards. He served in the Prussian and Austrian armies and established a collection of minerals and archaeological objects, which in 1912 passed to the city museum in Ústí nad Labem. He married Aminka Zülich von Zülborn (1833–1893) and had one son with her, Joseph von Rauch (1862–1911). Adalbert inherited the Trziblitz (Třebívlice) estate from Ulrike, which was acquired from him by the city of Brüx in 1901. He rose to first lieutenant in the Prussian Army and later retired as a colonel in the Austrian Army.

== Bibliography (in German) ==
- J. Schott: Die Familie v. Rauch in der Preußischen Armee, In: Militär-Wochenblatt Nr. 79, 1893, S. 1981.
- Kurt von Priesdorff: Soldatisches Führertum, Bd. 6, Hamburg 1934, S. 39 f.
- Gothaische Adeliges Taschenbuch Bände B 1928 (ältere Genealogie) bis 1939, 471.
- Genealogisches Handbuch des Adels Bände B VII. (1965), S. 337 f.
- Adolf Kirschner: Erinnerungen an Goethes Ulrike und an die Familie von Levetzow-Rauch. Aussig (Ústí nad Labem), 1904
- Beiträge zur Heimatkunde des Aussig-Karbitzer Bezirkes. Herausgegeben in Aussig, 1929, S. 119–124.
- Klaus Hansel: Die Ehrenstiftsdamen vom Kloster Heiligengrabe, in: Der HEROLD Heft 11/1992, S. 303–309.
- Dagmar von Gersdorff: Goethes späte Liebe. Die Geschichte der Ulrike von Levetzow. Insel-Bücherei Nr. 1265, 2005, S. 100–109.
- Trebivlicko 99 – Osudova Laska J.W.Goetha a Ulriky von Levetzow v Trebivlicich.
