= General von Rauch =

General von Rauch may refer to:

- Albert von Rauch (1829–1901), Prussian Army general of the infantry
- Bonaventura von Rauch (1740–1814), Prussian Army major general
- Friedrich von Rauch (born 1855) (1855–1935), Prussian Army general of the cavalry
- Gustav von Rauch (1774–1841), Prussian Army general of the infantry
- Leopold von Rauch (1787–1860), Prussian Army major general

== See also ==
- General Rauch (disambiguation)
