= Carl Malchin =

German painter

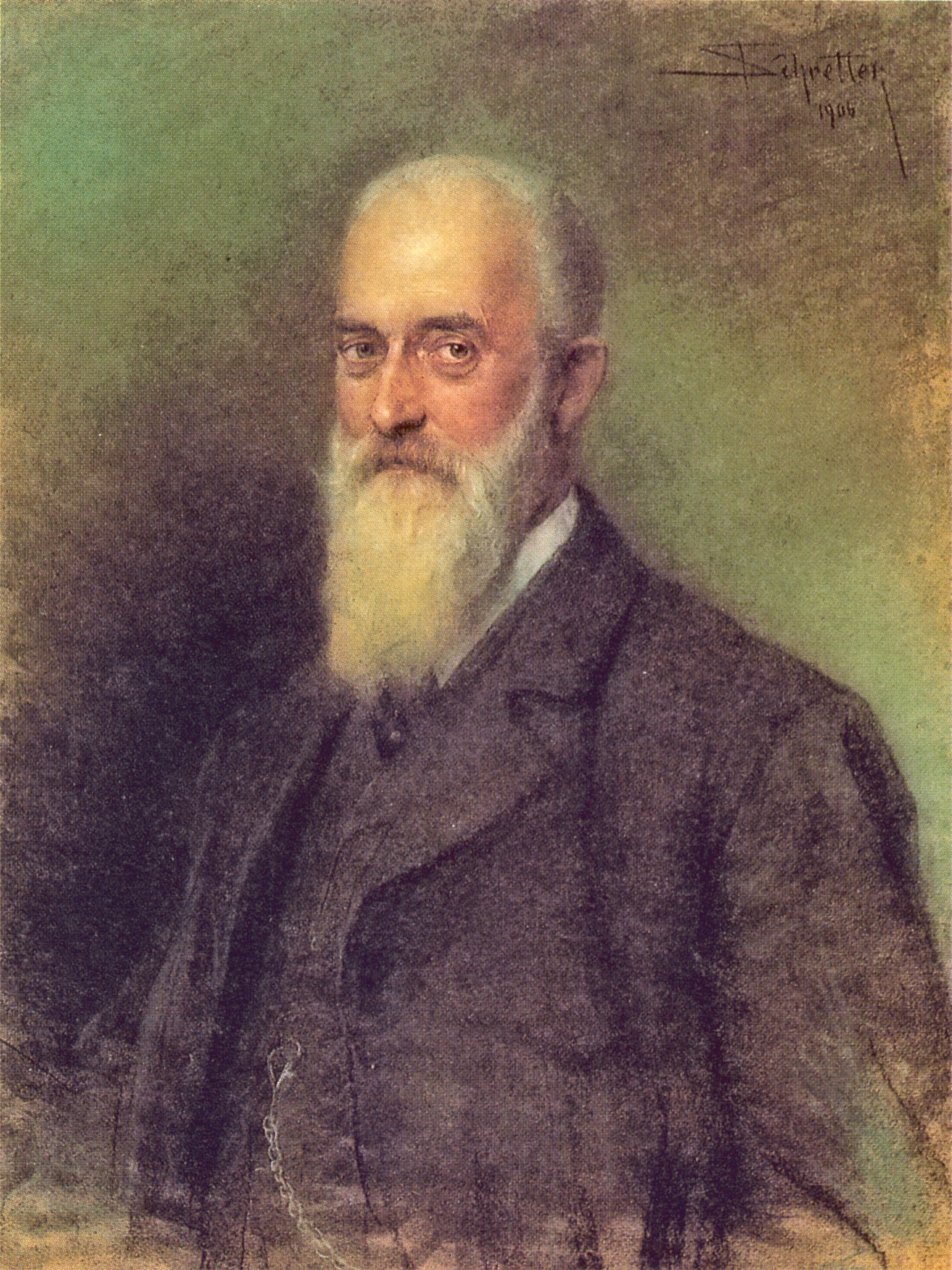
Carl Malchin (1906); portrait by Josef Schretter

Carl Wilhelm Christian Malchin (14 May 1838, Kröpelin - 23 January 1923, Schwerin) was a German landscape painter and art conservator.

== Life ==
His father was a member of the Mecklenburg legislature. He attended the Realschule in Rostock, then was apprenticed to a surveyor in Schwaan. He aspired to be a shipbuilder, but was not sufficiently strong and robust for that type of work, so he remained with the surveyor for three more years as his assistant. At this time, he made the acquaintance of two young painters from a nearby art colony who encouraged him to develop an interest in painting.

From 1860 to 1862, he attended the Polytechnikum in Munich, ostensibly to study geodesy and engineering but, instead, he frequented the local artists' studios where he got to know Adolf Heinrich Lier and began taking lessons from one of Lier's friends. Nevertheless, he finished his course at the Polytechnikum and, after a short training period in Rostock, took the engineering exam. He then worked in the land surveying office of the Grand Duchy of Mecklenburg-Schwerin and painted in his spare time.

His work attracted the attention of the Court Painter, Theodor Schloepke, who obtained a scholarship for him from Grand Duke Friedrich Franz II. He began his formal studies in 1873 at the Weimar Saxon-Grand Ducal Art School under Theodor Hagen.

Despite the scholarship, he experienced continuing financial problems. His paintings did not sell very well. Many were bought by the Grand Duke and his court for a nominal sum. Finally, in 1879, he was offered the position of art conservator and restorer for the Ducal collection. He was given a generous contract that allowed him plenty of space and time to pursue his own work. This freedom was used to travel extensively. The area around Ahrenshoop was especially inspiring to him.

In 1890, Grand Duke Friedrich Franz III appointed him a professor. After 1903, he lived in the village of Ostorf near Lake Schwerin. He retired in 1915 and was presented with the Knight's Cross of the Order of the Griffon. A proposed retrospective of his work had to be cancelled due to the war and was not presented until 1923, after his death. Approximately 260 of his paintings are in the possession of the Staatliches Museum Schwerin. Ninety-two were destroyed during World War II. A street in Schwerin has been named after him.

== Selected works ==
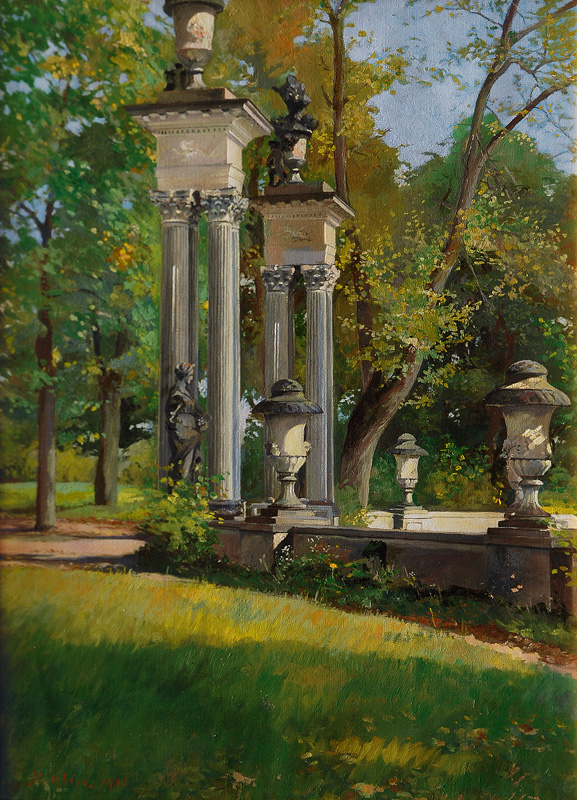
In the Castle Park

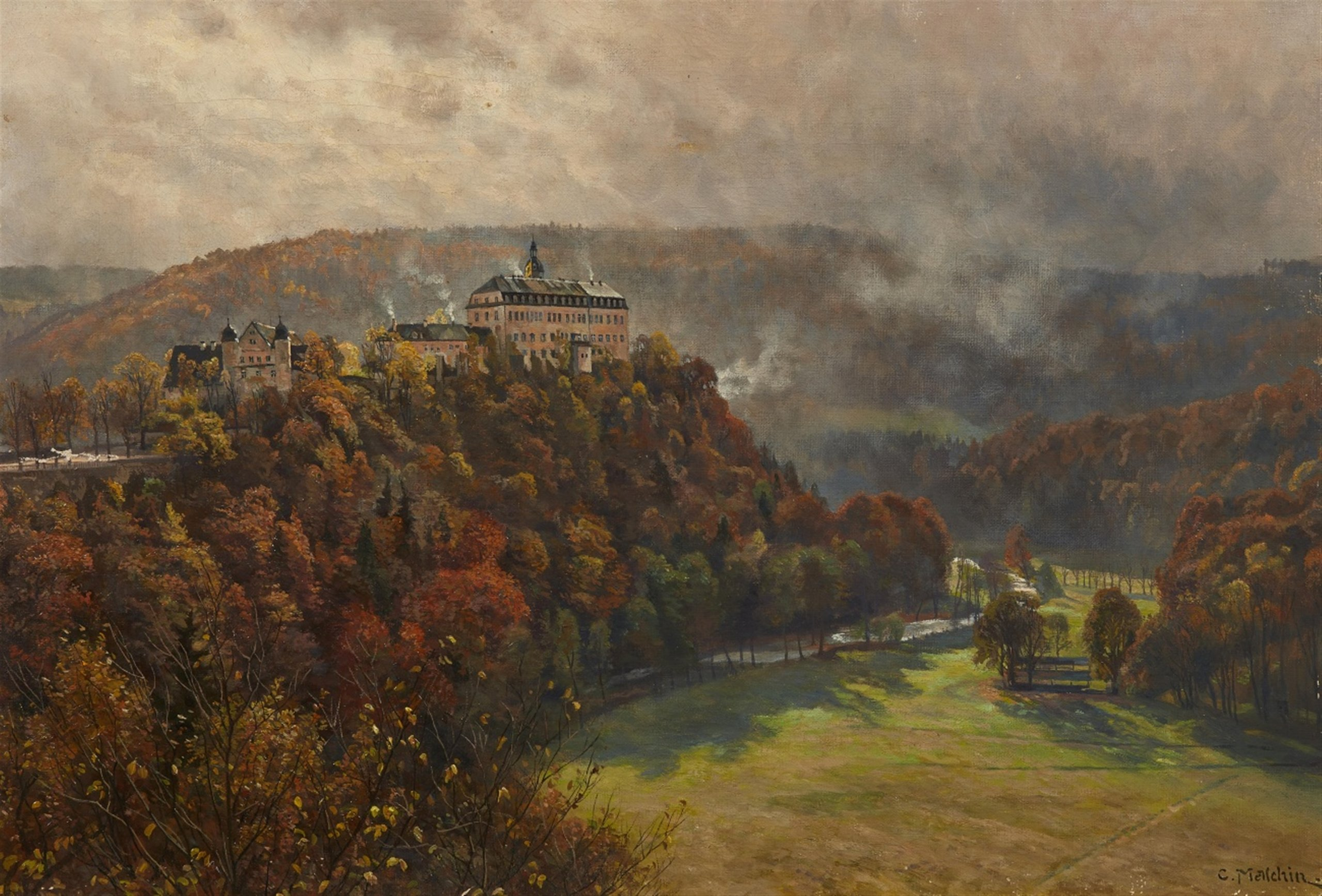
Schloss Schwarzburg

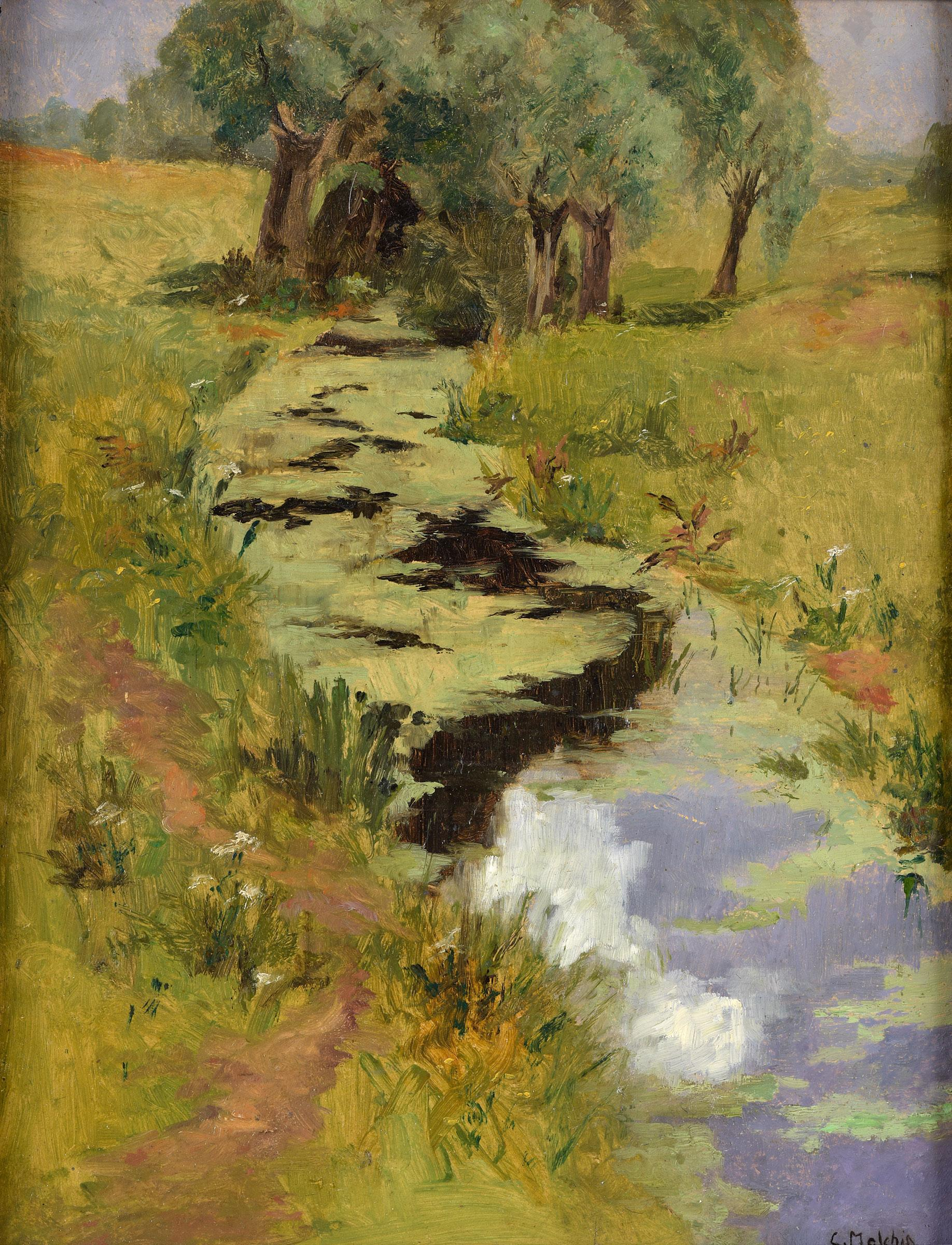
Summer Landscape with Stream

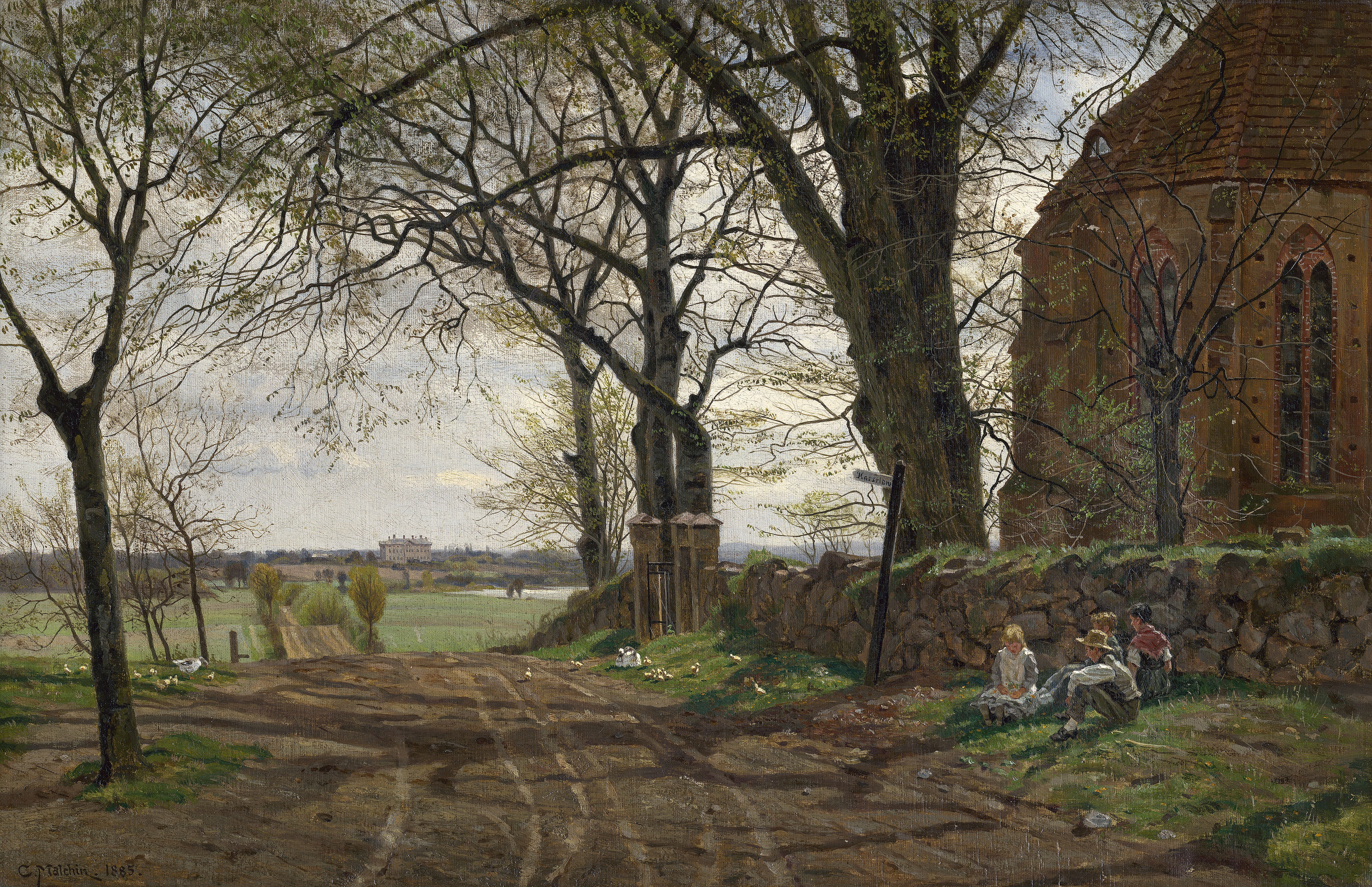
Early Spring at the Village Church in Gressow

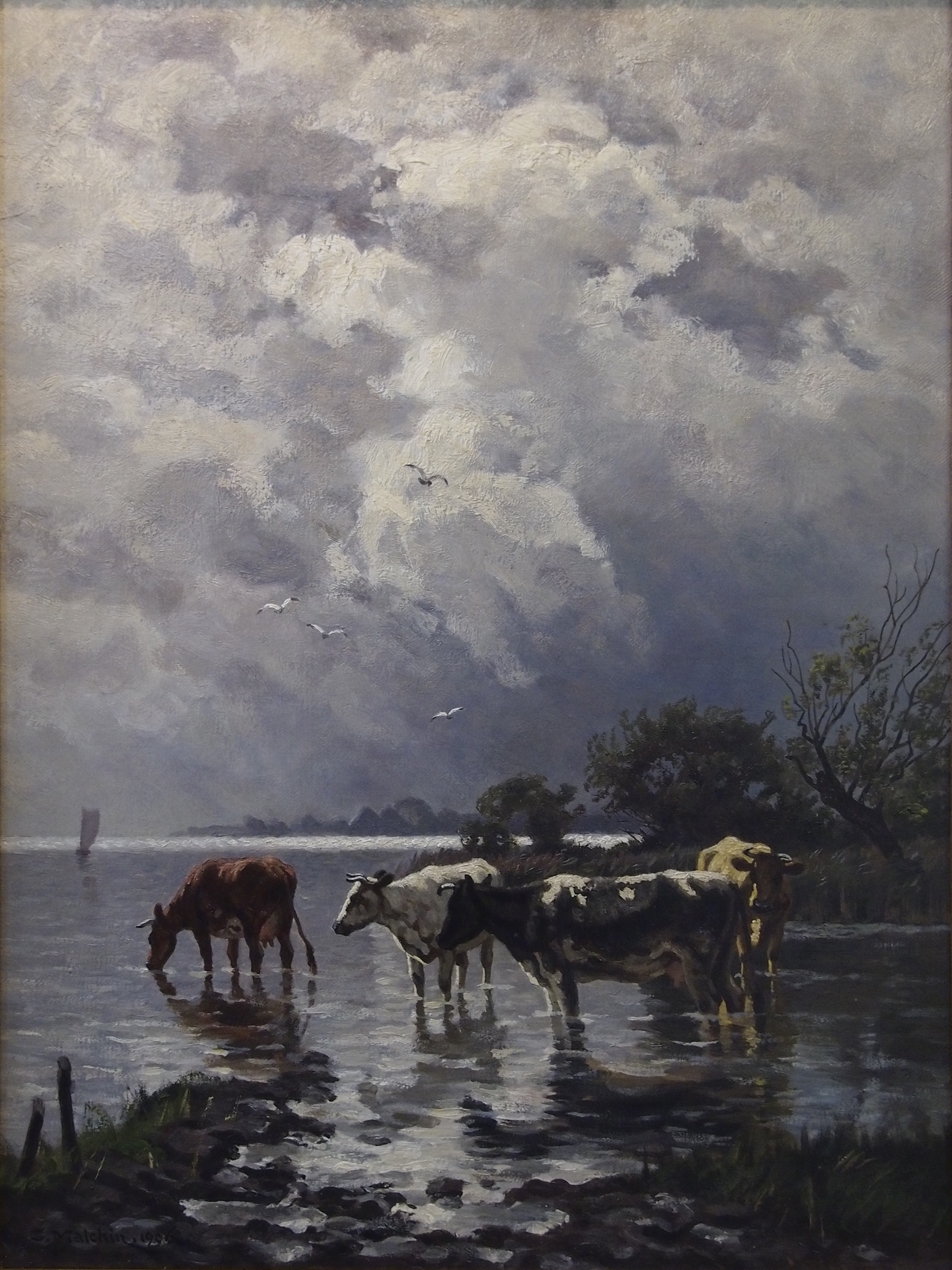
Cows at the
Watering Place
