= Friedrich von Rauch (born 1855) =

Prussian general

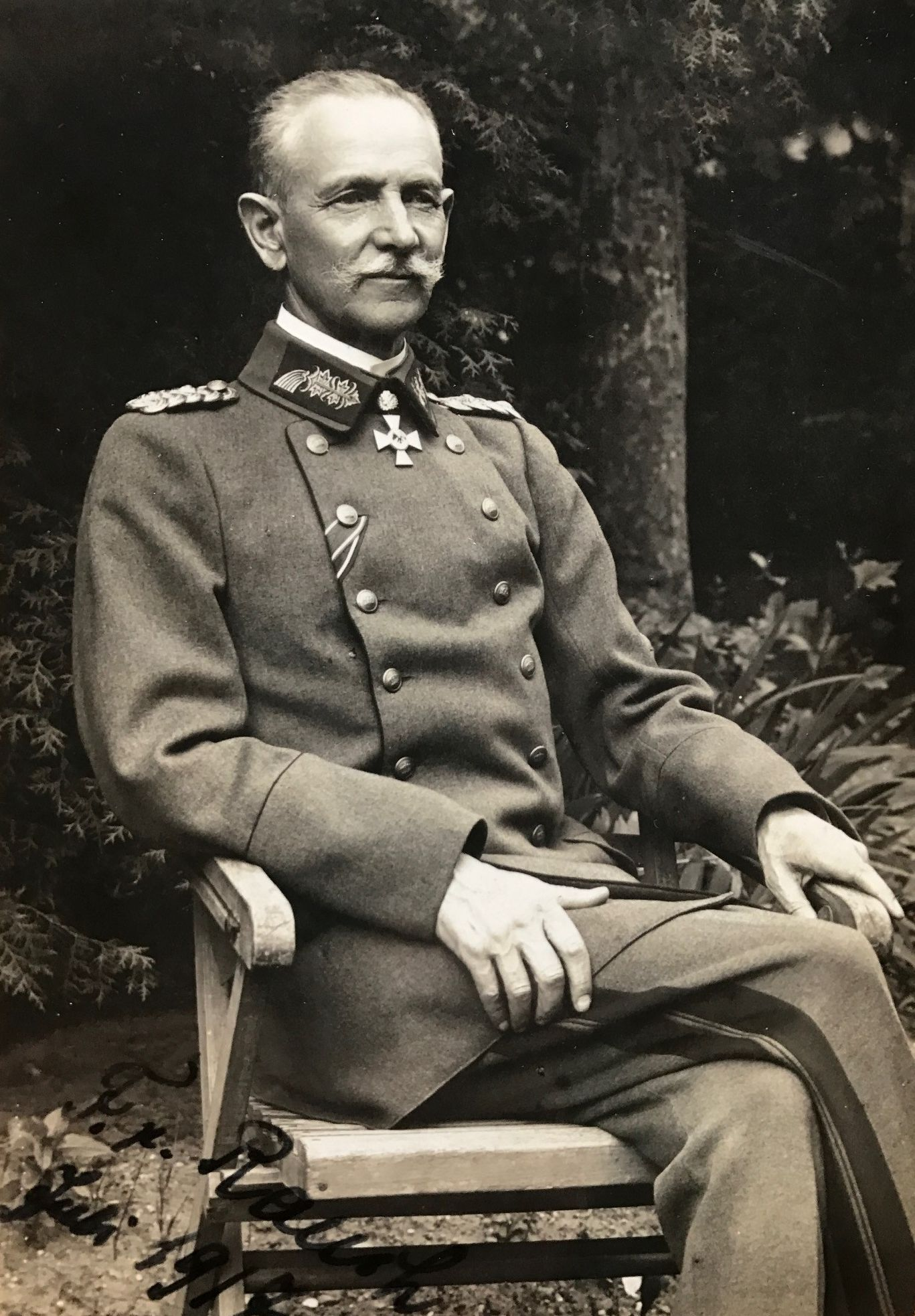
Friedrich von Rauch, 1917

Friedrich Leopold Bonaventura von Rauch (15 February 1855 in Berlin – 22 April 1935 in Berlin) was a Prussian general of the cavalry and born into an aristocratic Prussian family with a long history of military service.

== Life ==
He served from 1871 to 1911 and was the son of the General of the Cavalry Alfred Bonaventura von Rauch, adjutant general to the German Emperors, and his wife Elisabeth, née Countess of Brühl, lady-in-waiting to Queen consort Elisabeth Ludovika of Prussia. He was the great-grandson of Major General Bonaventura von Rauch (1740-1814) and grandson of Lieutenant General Friedrich Wilhelm von Rauch (1790-1850), adjutant general to King Frederick William IV of Prussia.

On his mother´s side he was grandson of Count Carl von Brühl (1772-1837), Superintendent general of the Prussian royal theatres, and descendant of Count Heinrich von Brühl (1700-1763), statesman at the court of Saxony and the Polish–Lithuanian Commonwealth.

He was first married to Anna von Behr-Schmoldow (1865-1896), owner of the Schmoldow estate in Western Pomerania. Amélie von Bülow-Gudow (1868-1950), court lady of Grand Duchess consort Marie von Mecklenburg-Schwerin, became his second wife.

Rauch was buried in his family's grave at the Berlin Invalids´ Cemetery next to his parents and grandparents. The grave site of the Rauch family is still preserved today (restored after the German reunification).
