= Alfred Bonaventura von Rauch =

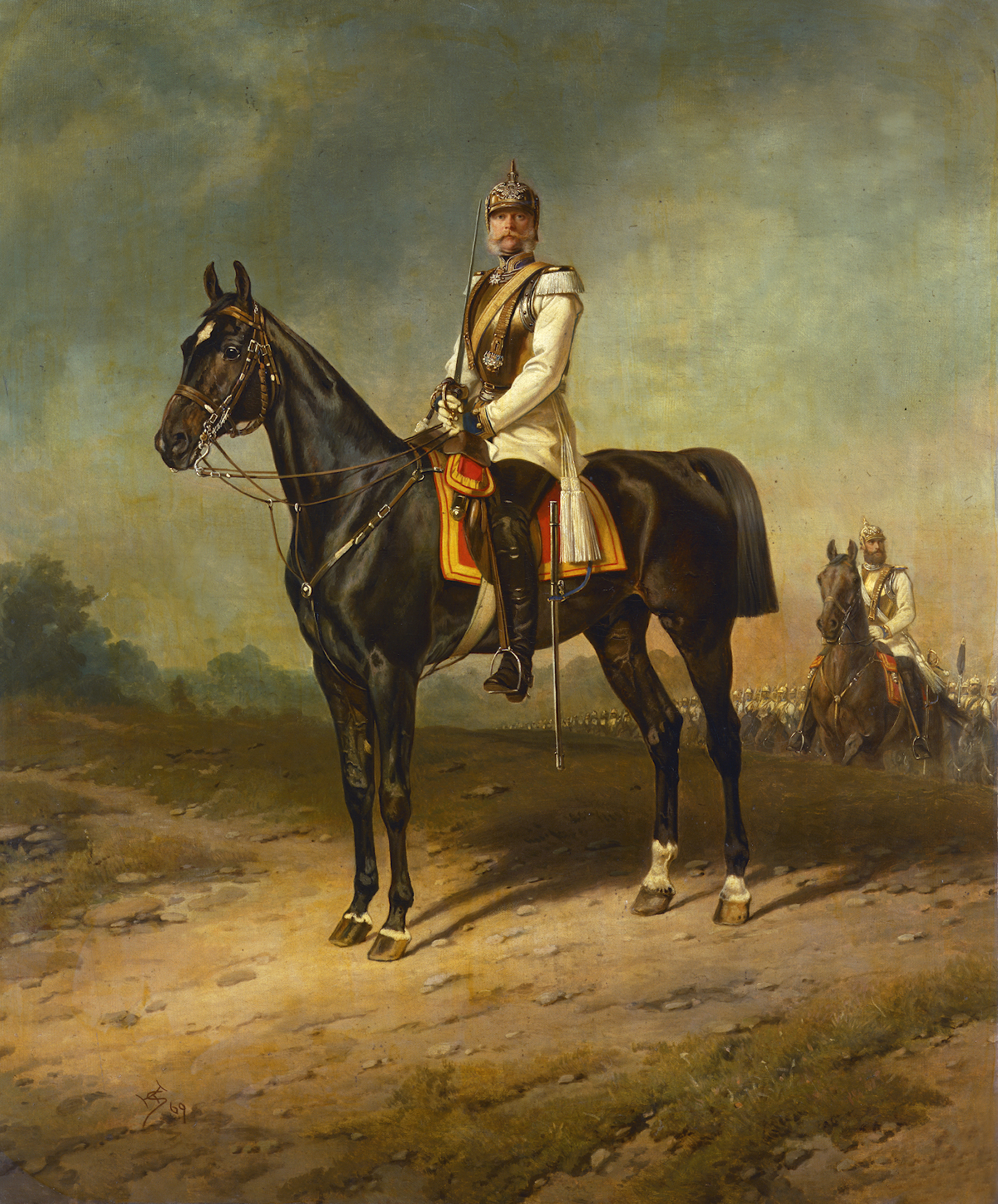
Alfred Bonaventura von Rauch as colonel and regimental commander of the 6th (Brandenburg) Cuirassiers “Emperor Nicholas I of Russia”, oil painting by Theodor Schloepke, 1869

Alfred Bonaventura von Rauch (1 April 1824, Potsdam - 25 September 1900, Berlin) was a general of the cavalry in the Prussian Army and an amateur jockey. He was born in Potsdam and died in Berlin.

Born into an aristocratic Prussian family with a tradition of military service, he was the son of the Prussian Lieutenant General Friedrich Wilhelm von Rauch (1790-1850), military attache in St Petersburg and adjutant general to King Frederick William IV of Prussia, and his wife Laurette, née Countess von Moltke. He was the grandson of Major General Bonaventura von Rauch (1740-1814) and nephew of the General of the Infantry Gustav von Rauch, Prussian Minister of War from 1837 to 1841 and honorary citizen of Berlin.

In 1851 he married Elisabeth, née Countess von Brühl, lady-in-waiting to Queen consort Elisabeth Ludovika of Prussia. Elisabeth von Brühl was daughter of Count Carl von Brühl, Superintendent general of the Prussian royal theatres, and great-granddaughter of Count Heinrich von Brühl, statesman at the court of Saxony and the Polish–Lithuanian Commonwealth.

He started his career in 1842 and served as an adjutant general to the German Emperors from 1884 to 1894. In 1862 he was one of the founders of Berlin's Army Steeplechase in Karlshorst. His son Friedrich von Rauch also took up a military career und became general of the cavalry as well.

Rauch was buried in his family's grave at the Berlin Invalids' Cemetery. His grave is still preserved today.

== Sources ==
- Kurt von Priesdorff: Soldatisches Führertum, Vol.8, Hanseatische Verlagsanstalt Hamburg, 1941, pgs.16–17
- Zum Fünfzigjährigen Dienstjubiläum des Generals der Kavallerie und Generaladjutanten Weiland Seiner Majestät des Kaisers und Königs Wilhelm I., Präses der Generalordenskommission von Rauch I. In: Militär-Wochenblatt. #45, 24 May 1893, pp. 1229–1232.
- Die Familie v. Rauch in der Preußischen Armee. In: Militär-Wochenblatt. #79, 6 September 1893, pp. 1979–1985.
