= Karl Rettich =

German landscape artist and draftsman

Karl Lorenz Rettich
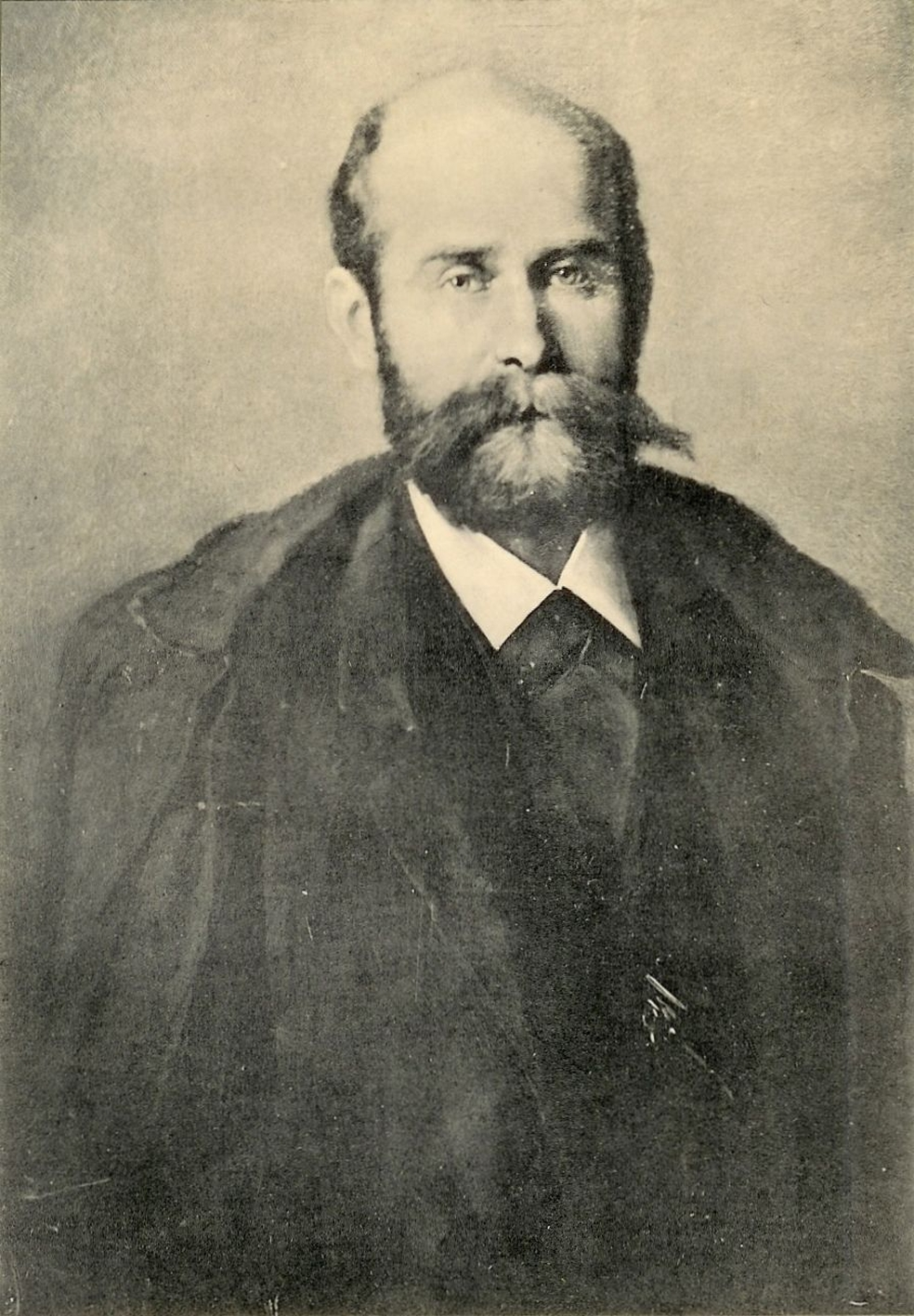
- Rettich, based on a painting by Josef Schretter
- Born: 10 June 1841; Rosenhagen, Mecklenburg, Germany
- Died: 12 September 1904 (aged 63); Lübeck, Germany
- Occupations: landscape artist and draftsman

Karl Lorenz Rettich (10 June 1841 – 12 September 1904) was a German landscape artist and draftsman.

== Life ==
Rettich was born in Rosenhagen near Dassow in Mecklenburg. His father was owner of the manor in this small village near the Bay of Lübeck. The area on the Baltic Sea influenced him at an early age and in his later works. Rettich went to high school in Lübeck, then in 1859 to study law in Munich on his father's request. But he abandoned law in favor of landscape painting and became a pupil of Adolf Heinrich Lier. In 1862 he went to the Düsseldorf school of painting where he was until 1867 a student with Albert Flamm and Theodor Hagen. After living in Dresden from 1867 to 1870, he went in 1871 to Weimar. There he was at the Grand Ducal Saxon School of Arts for further studies of landscape painting as a student with Arnold Böcklin, Franz von Lenbach and Theodor Hagen. He undertook study trips to Norway and Sweden, as well as to Italy. After a few years in Munich (1886–1896) he moved to Lübeck and from there in April 1897 he went to Graal-Müritz on the Baltic Sea near Rostock. There he bought a house where he spent summers in the small community, and spent the winters in his parents' home in Lübeck. With the sale of postcards showing typical landscape motives, he could earn his living. And with the income he also had to build a pavilion in 1898, for the exposition of his paintings. In 1904 he died after surgery for cancer.

Rettich was a member of the German Art Cooperative (Allgemeine Deutsche Kunstgenossenschaft or AdK). He received awards for his works in London (1874), Melbourne (1876) and Munich (1876). Frederick Francis IV, Grand Duke of Mecklenburg-Schwerin appointed him for professor. His older brother was Meno Rettich (1839–1918), a lord of the manor and member of the German Parliament.

== Exhibitions and works (selection) ==
Rettich was regularly represented with his works at the well known exhibitions of the Royal Academy of Arts in Berlin, the "Great Art Exhibition Berlin" and in the Munich Glass Palace.

=== Royal Academy of Arts Berlin ===
- 1868 Nach dem Sturm (after the Storm), Mondschein (Moonshine)
- 1870 Wrack an der Ostsee (Wreck in the Baltic Sea)
- 1872 Nach dem Regen (After the rain)
- 1874 Strand mit Kühen (Beach with cows), Motiv bei Farsund in Norwegen (Scene from Farsund in Norway), Abendstimmung (Evening atmosphere),
- 1876 Frühlingslandschaft mit Spaziergängerin (Spring landscape with walking woman), Herbstlandschaft mit Pflügern (Autumn landscape with ploughing farmers), Frühlingslandschaft mit Rehen (Spring landscape with deer)
- 1877 Strand mit erratischem Block (Marienstein am Dassower See in Mecklenburg) (Beach with a Glacial erratic rock on Dassow Lake in Mecklenburg), Norwegischer Strand (Norwegian beach)
- 1878 Strandlandschaft (Beach landscape), Strand mit Schiffbruch (Beach with shipwreck)
- 1879 Norwegische Landschaft (Motiv von der Insel Straaholmen bei Krageroe) (Norwegian landscape - Scene from the Straaholmen Island at Krageroe)
- 1881 Strand mit Wildenten (Beach with ducks), Strand (Motiv von Vilm - Rügen)
- 1883 Norwegische Küste (Norwegian coast)
- 1884 Norwegische Küste (Panorama der Insel Straaholmen bei Krageroe) (Panorama of Straaholmen island at Krageroe)
- 1886 Norwegische Küste
- 1887 Morgenpromenade am Ostseestrand (Morning promenade on the Baltic beach)
- 1888 Frühlingsblüthe (Motiv aus Capri) (Spring in blossom - Scene from Capri), Auf dem Wege nach Anacapri (On the way to Anacapri), Blick auf Anacapri
- 1889 In den Dünen bei aufziehendem Gewitter (In the dunes at thunderstorm), In den Ostsee-Dünen (In the Baltic Sea Dunes)
- 1892 Sturm in den Ostsee-Dünen (Storm in the Baltic Sea Dunes), Ein Sommertag in den Ostsee-Dünen (A Sommer day in the Baltic Sea Dunes)

=== Great Art Exhibition Berlin ===
- 1893 Norwegische Landschaft
- 1894 Herbstliche Parkszene (Park scene in Autumn), Waldwiese (Meadow Forest)
- 1895 Eichenallee (Oak-Avenue), Mecklenburgische Ostseeküste (Baltick coast in Mecklenburg)
- 1897 Alte Baumgruppe auf Vilm bei Rügen (Old Tree group on Vilm island near Rügen, Strand von Vilm (Beach at Vilm), Alte Buche auf Vilm (Old Beech)
- 1898 Im Isarbett (The Isar Riverbed)
- 1899 Herbstmorgen auf der Vilm (Autumn morning at Vilm), Herbstabend in der Rostocker Haide (Autumn evening in the Rostock Heath)
- 1901 Im Zwielicht (In the twilight)
- 1902 Motiv aus Graal (Scene from Graal), Abendlied (Motiv aus Graal) (Evening song - Scene from Graal)
- 1903 Frühling in der Rostocker Heide (Spring time in the Rostock Heath)

=== Munich Glass Palace ===
- 1879 Strand mit Schiffbruch (Beach with shipwreck), Einsamkeit - Motiv aus Norwegen (Loneliness - Scene from Norway)
- 1883 Norwegische Landschaft (Norwegian landscape), Abend am Waldrande (Evening at the edge of forest)
- 1888 Ostseestrand bei aufziehendem Gewitter (Baltic beach at thunderstorm)
- 1889 Ostseestrand im Herbst (Baltic beach at Autumn time), Anacapri
- 1890 Frühstückspause (Breakfast-Time)
- 1891 Norwegische Landschaft (Motiv von der Insel Straaholmen bei Langesund) (Norwegian landscape - Scene from the Straaholmen Island at Langesund)
- 1892 Eichenallee (Oak-Avenue)
- 1893 Altes Kloster bei Bordighera (Old monastery at Bordighera)
- 1900 Am Dorfteich (Motiv bei Lübeck) (On the village pond - Scene from Lübeck)
- 1901 Mecklenburgische Landschaft (Landscape in Mecklenburg)
- 1902 In den Ostseedünen (In the Baltic Sea Dunes)
