= 885 Ulrike =

Main-belt asteroid

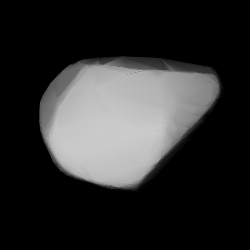
- Modelled shape of Ulrike from its lightcurve

Discovery
- Discovered by: S. Belyavskyj
- Discovery site: Simeiz Obs.
- Discovery date: 23 September 1917

Designations
- Named after: Ulrike von Levetzow (friend and love of Goethe)
- Alternative designations: 1917 CX · 1933 QQ; 1934 XL · A906 SE; 1917 CX · 1906 SE
- Minor planet category: main-belt · (outer) background · Themis

Orbital characteristics
- Epoch 31 May 2020 (JD 2459000.5)
- Uncertainty parameter 0
- Observation arc: 112.98 yr (41,267 d)
- Aphelion: 3.6720 AU
- Perihelion: 2.5253 AU
- Semi-major axis: 3.0987 AU
- Eccentricity: 0.1850
- Orbital period (sidereal): 5.45 yr (1,992 d)
- Mean anomaly: 318.39°
- Mean motion: 0° 10^{m} 50.52^{s} / day
- Inclination: 3.3056°
- Longitude of ascending node: 148.90°
- Argument of perihelion: 203.78°

Physical characteristics
- Mean diameter: 30.537±0.756 km; 33.43±5.3 km; 44.69±1.06 km
- Synodic rotation period: 4.90±0.05 h
- Pole ecliptic latitude: (13.0°, −64.0°) (λ_{1}/β_{1}); (207.0°, −60.0°) (λ_{2}/β_{2})
- Geometric albedo: 0.047±0.003; 0.083±0.034; 0.109±0.025
- Spectral type: C (assumed)
- Absolute magnitude (H): 10.7

885 Ulrike (prov. designation: A917 SV or 1917 CX) is an elongated Themistian asteroid from the outer regions of the asteroid belt. It was discovered on 23 September 1917, by Soviet astronomer Sergey Belyavsky at the Simeiz Observatory on the Crimean peninsula. The presumed C-type asteroid has a short rotation period of 4.9 hours and measures approximately 33 kilometers (21 miles) in diameter. It was likely named after Ulrike von Levetzow, last love of Goethe.

== Orbit and classification ==
When applying the synthetic hierarchical clustering method (HCM) by Zappalà, Milani and Knežević (AstDys), Ulrike is a core member of the Themis family (602), a large asteroid family of carbonaceous asteroids named after 24 Themis. However, according to another HCM-analysis by Nesvorný, it is a background asteroid. It orbits the Sun in the outer main-belt at a distance of 2.5–3.7 AU once every 5 years and 5 months (1,992 days; semi-major axis of 3.1 AU). Its orbit has an eccentricity of 0.19 and an inclination of 3° with respect to the ecliptic. The asteroid was first observed at Lowell Observatory in August 1906. The body's observation arc begins at Heidelberg Observatory on 27 September 1906, more than a decade prior to its official discovery observation at Simeiz.

== Naming ==
This minor planet was allegedly named after Ulrike von Levetzow (1804–1899), a friend and last love of the German poet Johann Wolfgang von Goethe, who met Ulrike during summertime 1821–1823 in Marienbad, Bohemia. After she declined to marry him, Goethe started writing Marienbad Elegy, one of his finest poems. Lutz Schmadel, the author of the Dictionary of Minor Planet Names, considers this interpretation the most likely because the discoverer, who studied at Göttingen University, was an expert in German literature.

== Physical characteristics ==
Ulrike' spectral type is unknown. It is an assumed carbonaceous C-type asteroid, which agrees with the overall spectral type assigned to members of the Themis family.

=== Rotation period ===
In September 2010, a rotational lightcurve of Ulrike was obtained from photometric observations by John Menke at the Menke Observatory. Lightcurve analysis gave a rotation period of 4.90±0.05 hours with a high brightness variation of 0.55±0.05 magnitude, indicative of an elongated shape (U=3). An alternative period determination of 4.9268±0.0002 hours with an even higher amplitude of 0.72±0.12 was made by Laurent Bernasconi one month later in October 2010 (U=2). A modeled lightcurve using photometric data from the Lowell Photometric Database gave a sidereal period of 4.906164±0.000001 and two spin axes at (13.0°, −64.0°) and (207.0°, −60.0°) in ecliptic coordinates (λ, β).

=== Diameter and albedo ===
According to the survey carried out by the Infrared Astronomical Satellite IRAS, the Japanese Akari satellite, and the NEOWISE mission of NASA's Wide-field Infrared Survey Explorer (WISE), Ulrike measures (30.537±0.756), (33.43±5.3) and (44.69±1.06) kilometers in diameter and its surface has an albedo of (0.109±0.025), (0.083±0.034) and (0.047±0.003), respectively. The Collaborative Asteroid Lightcurve Link adopts the results from IRAS, that is an albedo of 0.083 and a diameter of 33.43 kilometers based on an absolute magnitude of 10.7. The WISE team also published an alternative mean-diameter of (42.20±14.76 km) with an albedo of (0.08±0.06).
