= Friedrich Wilhelm von Rauch (born 1827) =

Lieutenant general in the Prussian Army

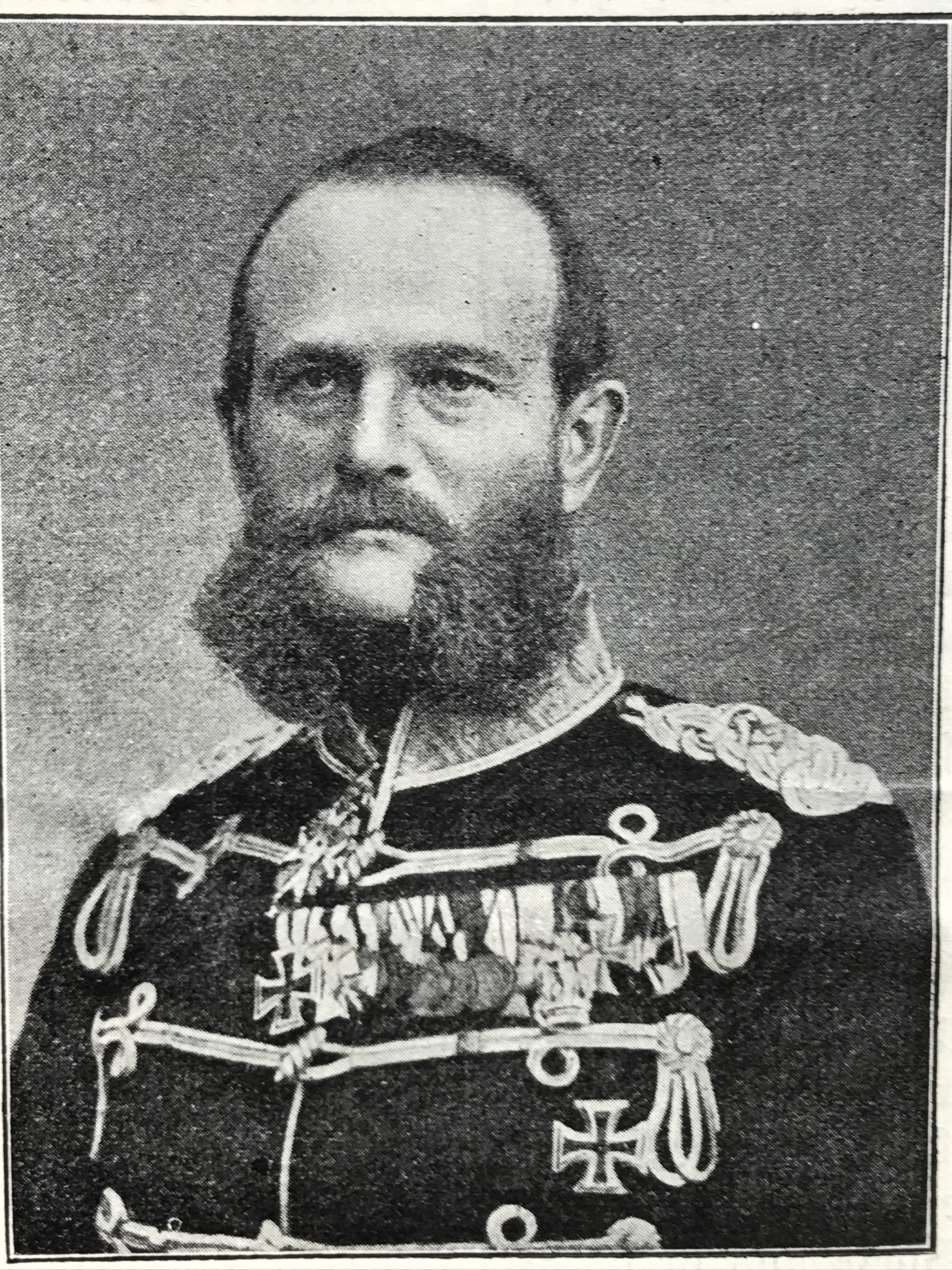
Friedrich Wilhelm von Rauch, c. 1870/1871

Friedrich Wilhelm Roderich von Rauch (3 January 1827 in Potsdam – 25 March 1907 in Schwerin) was a lieutenant general in the Prussian Army. His father Friedrich Wilhelm and his grandfather Bonaventura both also pursued military careers. He was born in Potsdam and died in Schwerin.

== Early life ==
Rauch was born in 1827 to lieutenant general Friedrich Wilhelm von Rauch and Laurette née Countess von Moltke. He was one of six siblings. On October 30, 1863, he married Katharina von Behr-Negendanck (1842-1897) in the German municipality of Passow, Mecklenburg.

Together they had seven children:

- colonel Alfred (1864–1948),
- cadet Wilhelm (1869–1890),
- Amélie (1870–1921), who married Paul Kriebitz,
- major Friedrich (Fritz) Egmont Gustav (1874-1945),
- Elisabeth (1877-1945), who married lieutenant colonel Konrad von Warnstedt,
- Egmont (1878–1935),
- first lieutenant Roderich Hermann Armand (1882-1914).

== Military career ==
In May 1846 Rauch became a second lieutenant and worked from January 1851 as a regimental adjutant. In this position he was promoted to Rittmeister until the end of May 1859. Otto von Bismarck, then a Prussian envoy to St. Petersburg, wrote about him: "The young Rauch is an officer of the kind I always regard as a reserve of diplomacy: his father's calm mind and good manners." Rauch received command of the 1st Squadron in Perleberg and occupied Flensburg with his Uhlans in 1864 in the war against Denmark. He confiscated a number of Danish merchant ships with his soldiers in the harbor, which prompted King Wilhelm I to comment on the entry of Prussian troops into Berlin: "Look at the man who has conquered more ships than the entire Prussian fleet." For his achievements, Rauch received the Order of the Red Eagle, 4th class.
