= Walery Brochocki =

Polish landscape painter

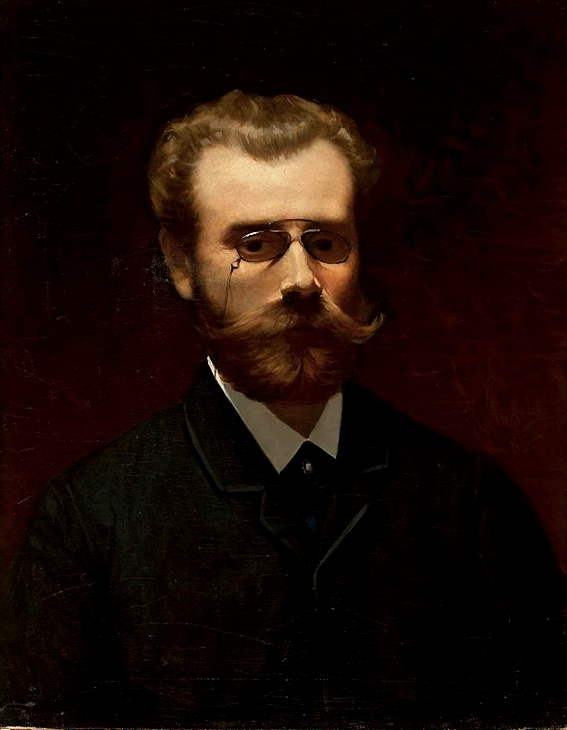
Walery Brochocki; portrait by Kazimierz Marecki (1885)

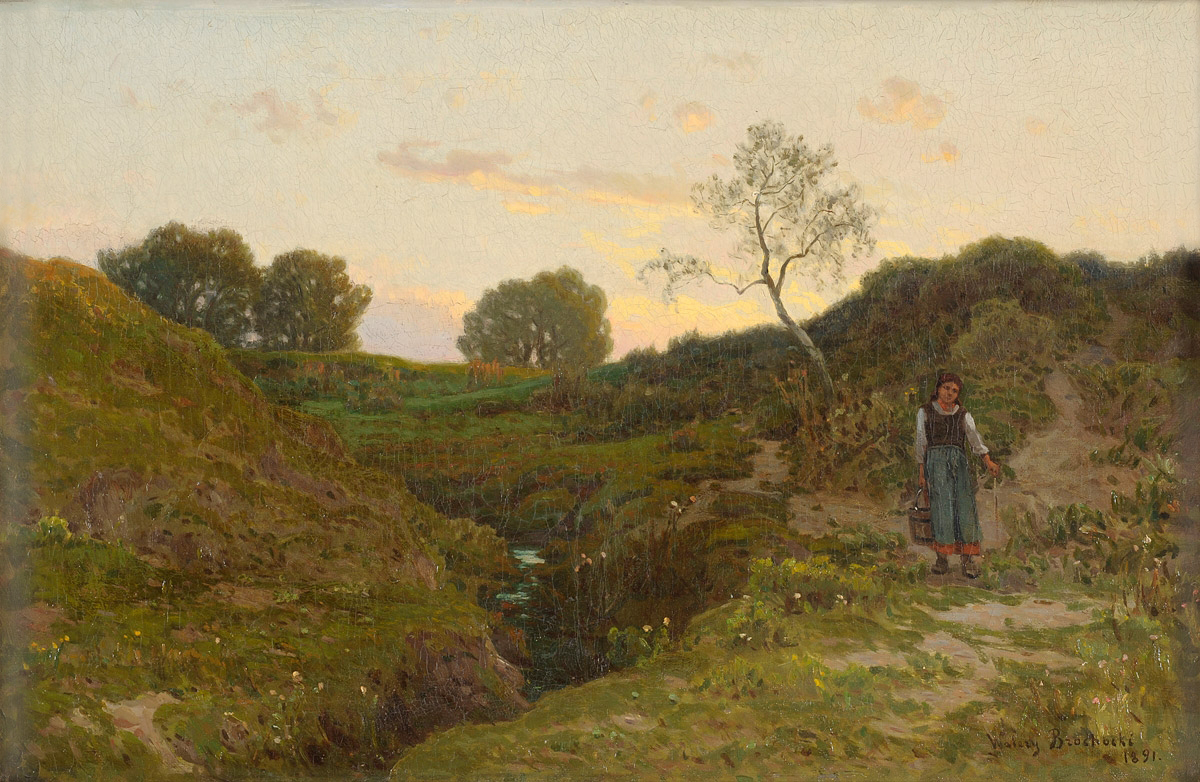
A Woman Carrying Water

Walery Brochocki (15 December 1847, Włocławek - 13 October 1923, Warsaw) was a Polish landscape painter.

== Biography ==
His father died when he was ten and his family placed him in the Cadet School in Moscow. In 1866, after serving for only a short time in the Russian Army, he resigned and enrolled at a private drawing school in Warsaw, under the direction of Chrystian Breslauer.

In 1869, he transferred to the Academy of Fine Arts, Munich, where he studied with Adolf Heinrich Lier and Hermann Anschütz and first began specializing in landscapes.

He first exhibited at various salons in Munich. At the 1873 Vienna World's Fair, he received a silver medal for his painting of a Gypsy camp. He moved to Paris in 1877, where he devoted himself to painting landscapes and cityscapes. During this time, he came under the influence of Charles-François Daubigny. The following year, he received a commission from the French Colonial Society to go to Algiers, where he created a large panorama of the city.

In 1888, he returned to Poland and settled in Warsaw; although he travelled extensively, visiting Podole, Bessarabia and Lithuania. His works were exhibited at the Society for the Encouragement of Fine Arts of Warsaw in Warsaw and the Kraków Society of Friends of Fine Arts.

Several Warsaw weeklies published reproductions of his works; including Kłosy (Ears), for which he also wrote an article about the Białowieża Forest, and Wędrowiec (The Wanderer).

During his last years, he was a member of the progressive artists' group, Pro Arte. He is interred at Powązki Cemetery.
