= A Man in Love (novel) =

2008 novel by Martin Walser

- Author: Martin Walser
- Original title: Ein liebender Mann
- Translator: David Dollenmayer
- Language: German
- Publisher: Rowohlt Verlag
- Publication date: 2008
- Publication place: Germany
- English publication date: 2019
- Pages: 288

A Man in Love (German: Ein liebender Mann) is a 2008 novel by the German writer Martin Walser.

== Plot ==
In the spa town of Marienbad in the summer of 1823, the 73-year-old writer Johann Wolfgang von Goethe is infatuated with the 19-year-old Ulrike von Levetzow.

== Reception ==
Felicitas von Lovenberg of the Frankfurter Allgemeine Zeitung calls A Man in Love Walser's "most tender, inexorable and conciliatory" novel. Andreas Merkel of Der Spiegel says its greatest strength is its narrative tone, which allows Walser to have Goethe ponder about his genitals in front of a mirror as well as quote the "Marienbad Elegy" in full, and make it work as an organic whole. Joachim Kaiser of the Süddeutsche Zeitung said Walser's choice to portray the final defeat in Goethe's love life is in line with his general preference to portray losers. He said the first two thirds of the novel give a coherent portrait of Goethe, whereas the last third, taken up by a letter, comes off as an essay recognizably written by Walser. Benjamin Markovits of The New York Times says Goethe comes off as "more complex than sympathetic", with exaggerated feelings but real pain.

The English translation by David Dollenmayer was shortlisted for the 2020 Helen and Kurt Wolff Translator's Prize.
