= Franz von Klebelsberg zu Thumburg =

Bohemian nobleman

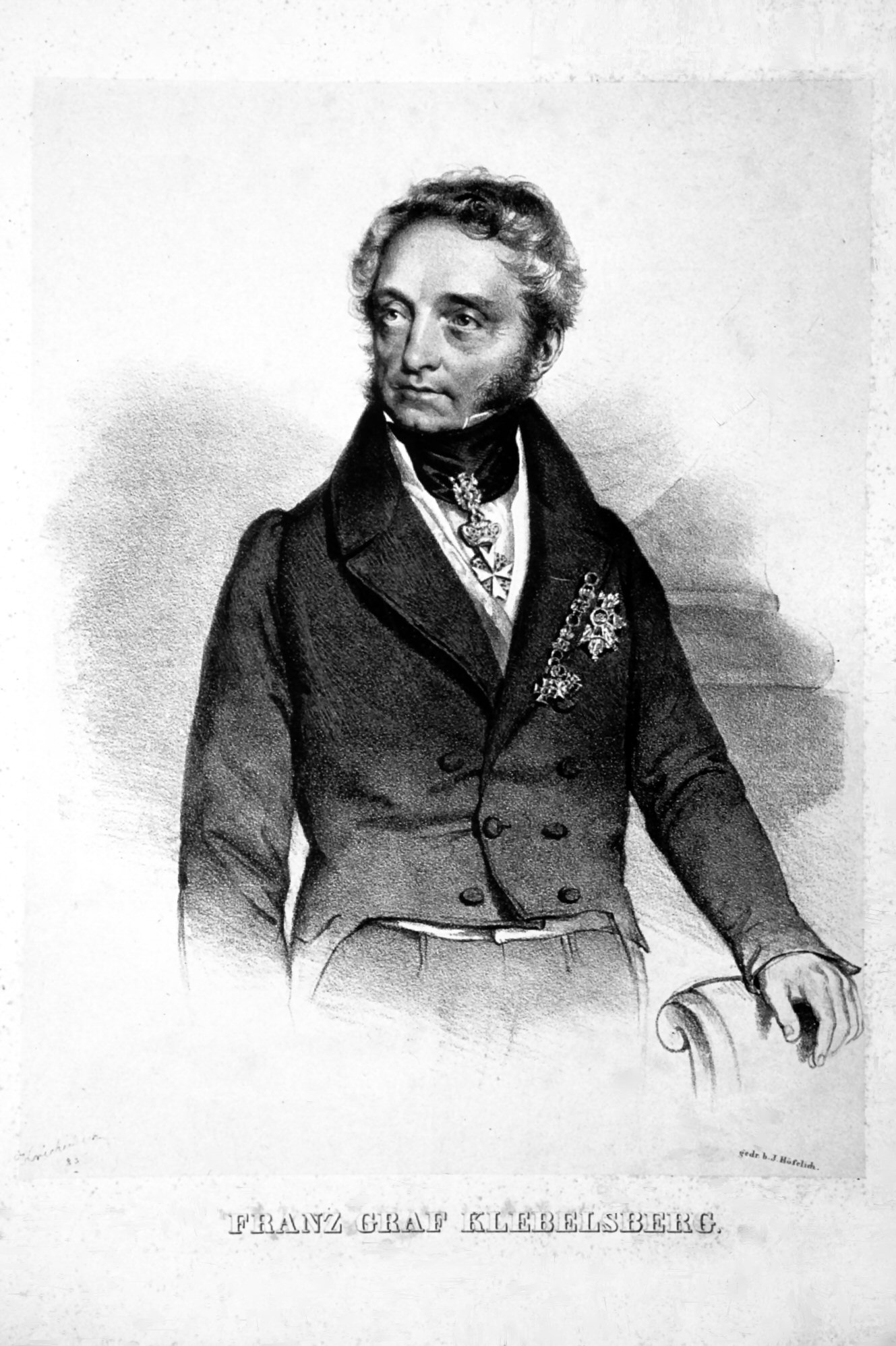
Franz Graf von Klebelsberg (1835)

Count Franz von Klebelsberg zu Thumburg (Czech: František Josef z Klebelsbergu) (24 July 1774 in Třebívlice – 28 December 1857 in Třebívlice) was a Bohemian nobleman, official of the Austrian Empire, Governor of Lower Austria and President of the Hofkammer (Court Chamber). He was also a passionate collector, as he owned a significant number of coins, medals and engravings.

== Early life and ancestry ==
Born into the Bohemian noble family of Tyrolian origin, he was the son of Count Adalbert Wenzel Malachias Karl Borromäus von Klebelsbelrg und Thumburg (1738-1812), a regional judge in the Kingdom of Bohemia, and his second wife, Countess Antonia Kolowrat-Krakowska (1737–1799).

== Biography ==
In 1798 he was made chamberlain and in 1800 'gubernialrat' (councillor) in Bohemia. In 1811 he was made director of the body which organised a dole of wood and bread to the poor in Prague and two years later director general of Bohemia's military hospitals. He was made vice-president of the Moravian-Silesian Region in 1825 and gubernium (equivalent to the modern post of deputy governor) of Bohemia in 1827. He was also made a privy councillor in 1827, then governor of Lower Austria the following year. He finally served as president of the Hofkammer from 1830 to 1834. In 1843 he became the third husband of the widow Amalie von Broesigke, mother of Ulrike von Levetzow, the last love of the poet Goethe.

== Bibliography ==
- Österreichisches Biographisches Lexikon 1815–1950. Band 3, 1964, S. 373.
