= Tacherting =

- Municipality
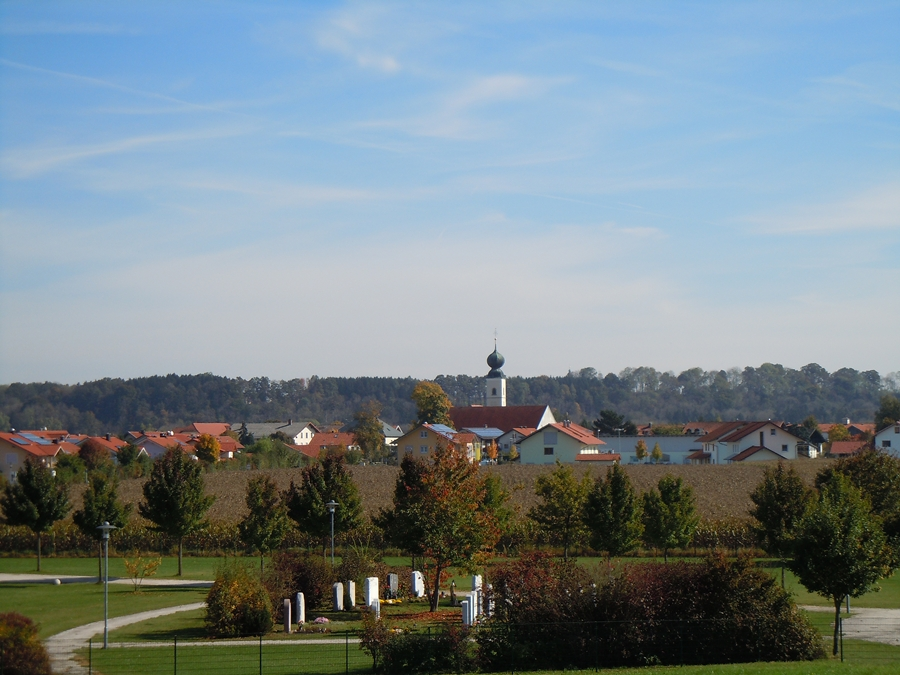
- Tacherting

- Coat of arms

- Location of Tacherting within Traunstein district
- Interactive map of Tacherting
- Location within Germany Location within Bavaria
- Coordinates: 48°5′N 12°34′E
- Country: Germany
- State: Bavaria
- Admin. region: Oberbayern
- District: Traunstein
- Subdivisions: 108 Ortsteile

Government
  - Mayor (2020–26): Werner Disterer (FW)

Area
  - Total: 50.24 km^{2} (19.40 sq mi)
- Elevation: 473 m (1,552 ft)

Population (2025-12-31)
  - Total: 5,647
  - Density: 112.4/km^{2} (291.1/sq mi)
- Time zone: UTC+01:00 (CET)
  - Summer (DST): UTC+02:00 (CEST)
- Postal codes: 83340–83342
- Dialling codes: 08621 (Tacherting); 08622 (Em./Pet.); 08634 (Wiesmühl)
- Vehicle registration: TS

Tacherting (Central Bavarian: Tachading) is a municipality in the north of the district of Traunstein in Bavaria, Germany.

== History ==
The area of the municipality of Tacherting has a long history. Ground finds (hill graves) of the New Stone era, and of the late Bronze Age are occupied among other things. Likewise completely proven continuous settling during the Roman time, when the area of the province Noricum was belonging to the Roman world realm. Extensive archaeological excavations at the beginning of the 19th century occupy this part of local history.

== Subdivisions ==
The municipality of Tacherting consists of 108 districts:

- Aichmühle
- Aigner
- Altenham
- Arbeiter
- Arfling
- Attenberg
- Attenhub
- Au
- Außerperl
- Berg
- Brandstätt
- Brandstätter
- Buch
- Buchöster
- Degernfeld
- Eberting
- Eck
- Emertsham
- Fellern
- Fern
- Flecking
- Förgenthal
- Fuchsreit
- Galgenpoint
- Gerading
- Goldberg
- Guttenhof
- Haitzing
- Handler
- Harrer
- Haselreit
- Heimhilgen
- Hirschham
- Hochholzen
- Hochreit
- Hof
- Höhenmark
- Holzen
- Holzenhilgen
- Holzhäusl
- Hörzing
- Hütting
- Kainau
- Kirchstätt
- Kirschner
- Kitzler
- Klugham
- Laab
- Lehen
- Leiten
- Lengloh
- Liebharten
- Lohen
- Lufersöd
- Machesöd
- Maierlreith
- Maierstetten
- Mitterfelden
- Mittermühle
- Moos
- Mörn
- Mühlhausen
- Mussen
- Mussenmühle
- Neudeck
- Neuschalchen
- Niederhausen
- Oberbrunnham
- Otzen
- Peterskirchen
- Pfarrhof
- Pinzgau
- Ponthal
- Reicherting
- Reichgrub
- Reit
- Ruppling
- Rusch
- Schalchen
- Schergenhub
- Schermühle
- Schönlinden
- Schörging
- Schweinberg
- Schwoshub
- Siegharting
- Siegler
- Spiegelsberg
- Spreit
- Stadler
- Straß
- Tacherting
- Unterbrunnham
- Urthal
- Vogl
- Wajon
- Wartmoning
- Watzing
- Weg
- Weisthum
- Werfer
- Wies
- Willading
- Witzmoning
- Woishub
- Wolfanger
- Wolfhausen
- Zehnthof

== Economy ==
The biggest company in the municipality is the Linde AG with round about 800 employees. The second biggest company in Tacherting is a part of Evonik Industries. In Tacherting are also a lot of medium-sized businesses.

== People ==
- Bonaventura von Rauch (1740-1814), Prussian Army major general
