= Egmont von Rauch =

Egmont Roderich Carl von Rauch (8 January 1829 in Potsdam – 26 August 1875 in Oranienburg) was a cavalry officer and later colonel in the Prussian Army. He also founded the (Saxon-Thuringian Horse and Horse Breeding Association) and the horse races in Halle (Saale). He was born in Potsdam and died in Oranienburg. He was the youngest son of Friedrich Wilhelm von Rauch. He was promoted to Oberst (colonel) in 1873.
