= General Rauch =

General Rauch may refer to:

- Erwin Rauch (1889–1969), German Wehrmacht lieutenant general
- Hans Rauch (1899–1958), German Luftwaffe major general
- John T. Rauch (fl. 1990s–2020s), U.S. Air Force major general

== See also ==
- General von Rauch (disambiguation)
