= Amalie von Levetzow =

German noblewoman (1788–1868)

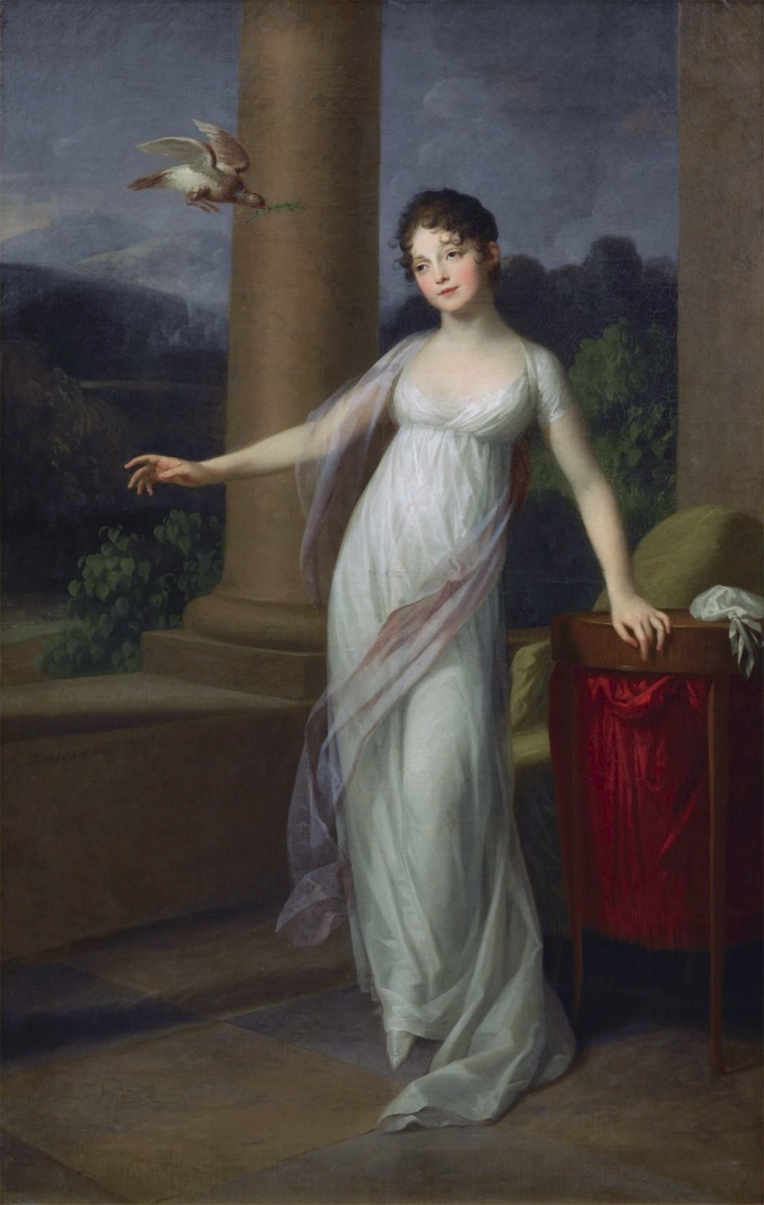
Amalie von Levetzow (1803) by Johann Friedrich August Tischbein (on permanent loan to the Goethe House, Frankfurt).

Amalie Theodore Caroline von Levetzow (née von Brösigke; 1788 – 1868) was a German noblewoman.

== Life ==
In 1803 she married Joachim Otto Ulrich von Levetzow (25 March 1777 - 28 January 1843) Earlier that year she was painted by Johann Friedrich August Tischbein. She and Joachim had two daughters, Ulrike and Amalia (or Amélie), but then the couple divorced. She then married his cousin Friedrich Carl Ulrich von Levetzow, who was killed at the Battle of Waterloo. She and Friedrich had one child, Bertha.

In 1821, 1822 and 1823 she and her children stayed at Marienbad, where she met daily with the 72-year-old Johann Wolfgang von Goethe. They became friends and he fell in love with Ulrike, then only seventeen. He sent her a marriage proposal via Amalie, having not mentioned it before to her or Ulrike. Karl August, Grand Duke of Saxe-Weimar-Eisenach met with Ulrike's mother to speak in Goethe's favour and - though she felt she could not refuse the Grand Duke - she stated any final decision must rest with Ulrike. She never mentioned the proposal to Ulrike, who never married. Goethe wrote of the situation in his Marienbad Elegy.

Amalie married a third time in 1843 to Franz Josef von Klebelsberg-Thumburg zu Třiblitz (24 July 1774 - 28 December 1857), President of the Hofkammer of the Austrian Empire and a count in the Bohemian nobility. After his death she inherited his estate at Třiblitz - she died there and left it to Ulrike.

== See also ==
- Ulrike von Levetzow
- Johann Wolfgang von Goethe
- Marienbad Elegy
- Johann Friedrich August Tischbein
- Battle of Waterloo
