= Bonaventura von Rauch =

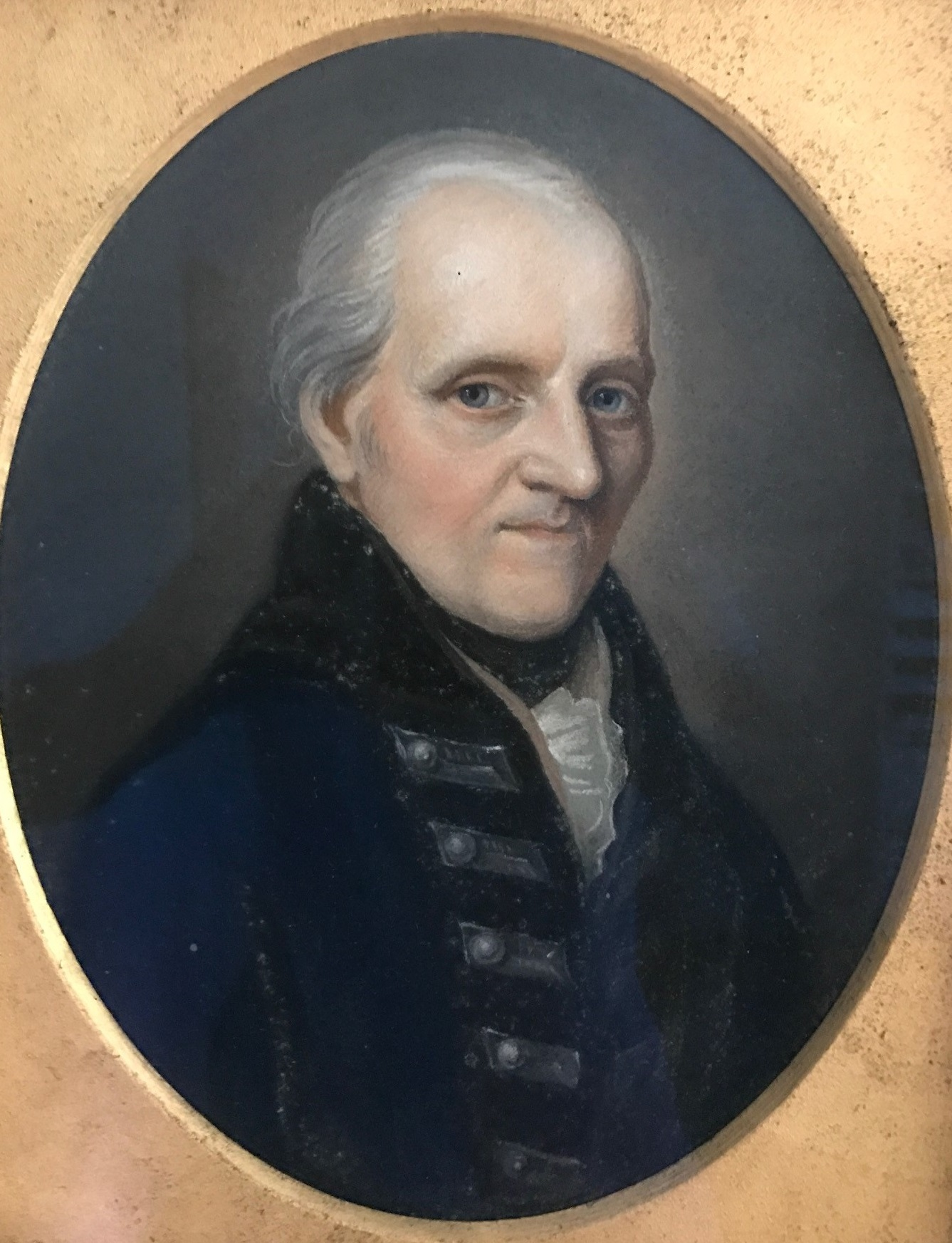
Bonaventura von Rauch

Johann Bonaventura von Rauch (25 July 1740 – 9 February 1814) was a Prussian Army major general. His sons Gustav, Leopold and Friedrich Wilhelm also took up military careers and became general as well.

== Life ==
He was born in Peterskirchen/Oberbayern into a Bavarian family. His father was the teacher Johann Anton Rauch (c 1686–1745). He began his career in 1756 as a page at the court of the Principality of Brunswick-Wolfenbüttel and in 1761 became an engineer in the Brunswick Army. Under Charles William Ferdinand, Duke of Brunswick-Wolfenbüttel he took part in the closing phases of the Seven Years' War, namely in the 1761-62 sieges of Kassel (in which he was wounded), Meppen and Ziegenhain. In 1764 he was made a conductor in the Brunswick Engineer Corps, rising to lieutenant in 1766 and captain in 1772.

On Charles William Ferdinand's recommendation, Rauch moved to the Prussian Army in August 1777. On personal instructions from Frederick II of Prussia he became a teacher at the mining corps in the Königsberg garrison. In 1788 Frederick William II of Prussia founded a Royal Engineering Academy in Potsdam - Rauch moved there and was promoted to major. The institution also took part in military surveying and so Rauch travelled to Silesia in 1791 and the Králický Sněžník Mountains in spring 1792. He also began to write treatises on military theory and to produce collections of maps.

He served as a captain of guides on the Prussian General Staff during the French campaign and helped take the fortresses at Longwy and Verdun. He then caught dysentery and stayed in a hospital in Koblenz until November 1792. The king made Rauch a lieutenant colonel in 1796 and put him in charge of the Engineering Academy. He became a major general in 1805 and was made deputy governor of Stettin on the outbreak of the War of the Fourth Coalition in summer 1806, with the 77-year-old lieutenant general von Romberg as governor. After the defeats in the battle of Jena-Auerstedt, Prussia's field army retreated and began to split up. Romberg's morale collapsed and when eight hundred French cavalry arrived before Stettin on 29 October 1806 he surrendered immediately without waiting to assess the size of the enemy force, which was vastly dwarfed by Stettin's garrison of 5,184.

Rauch agreed to the surrender and so on 1 December was dishonourably discharged from the Prussian Army. He was later placed under house arrest and then in 1809 sentenced to life imprisonment in the Spandau Fortress. His fate led to protests within Prussia's officer corps, especially since Romberg had only ever been a scientist and lecturer and had never before commanded an army in the field. Frederick William's queen-consort Louise of Mecklenburg-Strelitz took up the cause, but she was only able to get the sentence commuted to life imprisonment in the town of Spandau rather than the fortress, though she did also get half of Rauch's pension as a major general reinstated.

== Family ==
In 1773 at Kunow, he married Johanna Bandel (1752–1828).

Bonaventura und Johanna von Rauch had ten children:

- Gustav (1774–1841), Prussian Minister of War and general of the infantry, honorary citizen of Berlin,

married I in 1802 Caroline von Geusau (1780–1867),
married II in 1816 Rosalie von Holtzendorff (1790–1862)

- Caroline (1777–1829), married in 1799 Ludolph von Wulffen (1775–1827), Prussian Cavalry Captain (Rittmeister) at the Gardes du Corps
- Charlotte (1780–1807), married in 1802 Levin Friedrich von Bismarck, owner of the Briest and Welle family estates in the Altmark, honorary citizen of Magdeburg
- Emilie (1781–1807)
- Friederike (1783–1810), married in 1802 Heinrich von Knobelsdorff (1775–1826), Prussian major general, inspector of the Guard Cavalry
- Wilhelm (1785–1816), Prussian Captain at the Engineering Corps, married in 1814 Auguste Encke (1794–1861), niece of Countess Wilhelmine von Lichtenau
- Leopold (1787–1860), Prussian major general at the Staff College, married in 1827 Amélie von Levetzow (1805–1831), sister of Ulrike von Levetzow (Goethe addressed to her his Marienbad Elegy)
- Friedrich Wilhelm (1790–1850), Prussian lieutenant general, Adjutant general to King Frederick William IV of Prussia and Military attaché at the court of Emperor Nicholas I of Russia, married in 1816 Countess Laurette of Moltke (1790–1864), granddaughter of general of the cavalry Joachim Bernhard von Prittwitz
- Albert (1793–1814), fallen in the War of the Sixth Coalition, Prussian first lieutenant at the 1st Foot Guard Regiment
- Cecilie (1795–1854), married 1811 Gustav Freiherr von Maltzahn Graf von Plessen, Prussian lieutenant colonel at the Gardes du Corps, owner of the Ivenack family estate in Mecklenburg

== Bibliography ==
- Gothaisches Adliges Taschenbuch (Gotha Almanac Peerage Paperback), volumes B 1928 (older genealogy), p. 468 et seqq., and B 1939, p. 480 et seqq.
- Genealogisches Handbuch des Adels (Almanach de Gotha), volumes B VII (1965), p. 335 etseqq., and B XXI (1995), p. 434 et seqq.
- Die Familie von Rauch in der preußischen Armee. in: Militär-Wochenblatt. Nr. 79, p. 1979 et seqq.
- Kurt von Priesdorff: Soldatisches Führertum, volume 3, Hanseatische Verlagsanstalt Hamburg, p. 18 et seqq.
