= Třebívlice =

- Municipality
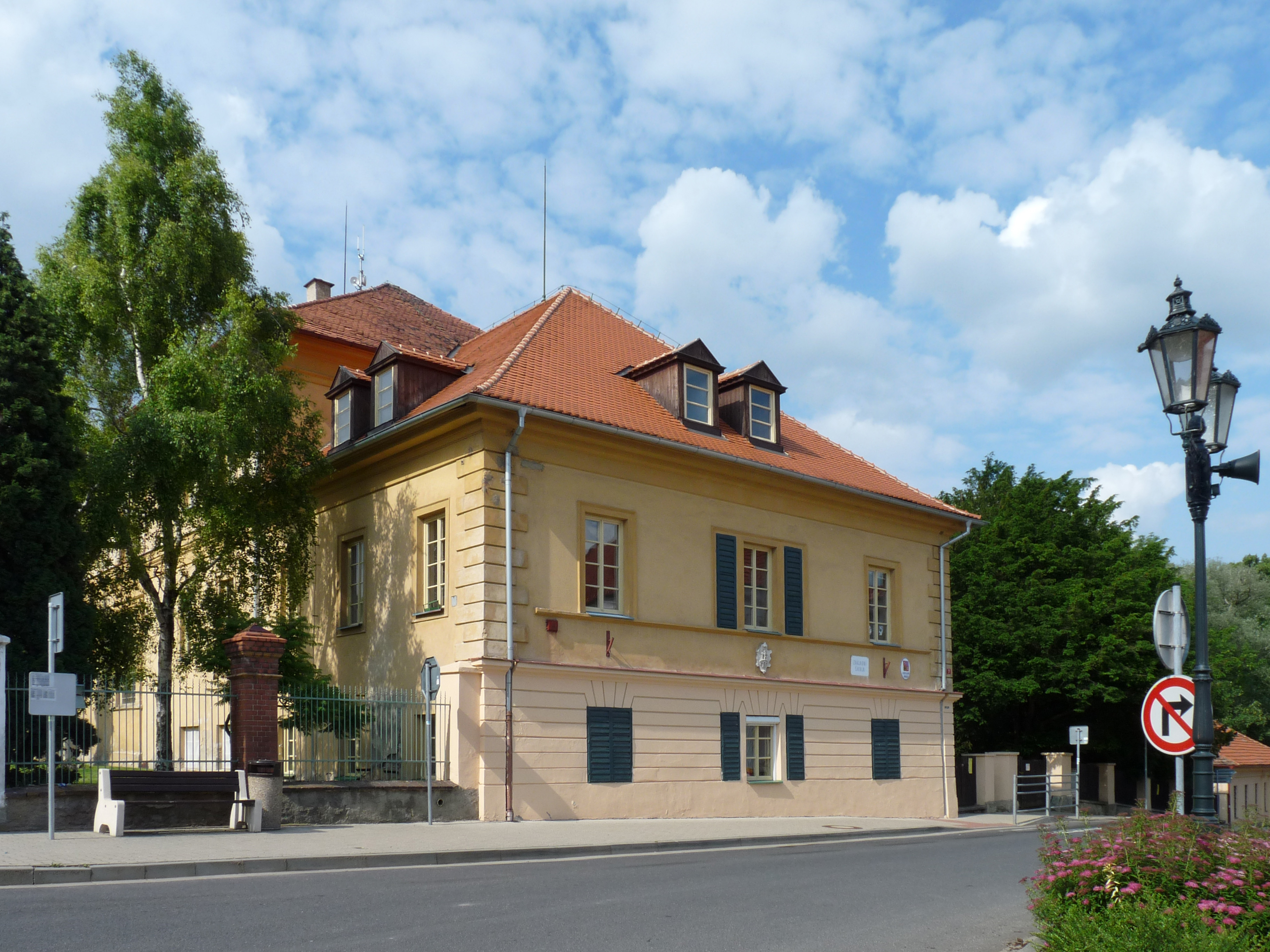
- Třebívlice Castle

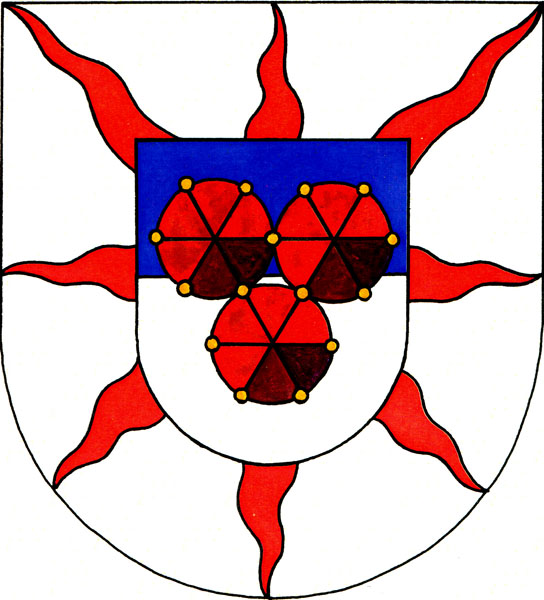
- Flag Coat of arms

- Location in the Czech Republic
- Coordinates: 50°27′29″N 13°53′58″E
- Country: Czech Republic
- Region: Ústí nad Labem
- District: Litoměřice
- First mentioned: 1318

Area
  - Total: 14.05 km^{2} (5.42 sq mi)
- Elevation: 275 m (902 ft)

Population (2026-01-01)
  - Total: 841
  - Density: 59.9/km^{2} (155/sq mi)
- Time zone: UTC+1 (CET)
  - Summer (DST): UTC+2 (CEST)
- Postal code: 411 15
- Website: www.obec-trebivlice.cz

Třebívlice is a municipality and village in Litoměřice District in the Ústí nad Labem Region of the Czech Republic. It has about 800 inhabitants.

Třebívlice lies approximately 18 kilometres (11 mi) south-west of Litoměřice, 25 km (16 mi) south-west of Ústí nad Labem, and 56 km (35 mi) north-west of Prague.

== Administrative division ==
Třebívlice consists of eight municipal parts (in brackets population according to the 2021 census):

- Třebívlice (508)
- Blešno (6)
- Dřemčice (106)
- Dřevce (21)
- Leská (38)
- Šepetely (49)
- Skalice (22)
- Staré (63)

== Demographics ==
Historical population
Year	Pop.	±%
1869	1,693	—
1880	1,626	−4.0%
1890	1,652	+1.6%
1900	1,581	−4.3%
1910	1,644	+4.0%
1921	1,516	−7.8%
1930	1,649	+8.8%
1950	1,100	−33.3%
1961	1,063	−3.4%
1970	995	−6.4%
1980	903	−9.2%
1991	776	−14.1%
2001	787	+1.4%
2011	858	+9.0%
2021	813	−5.2%
Source: Censuses

== Notable people ==
- Franz von Klebelsberg zu Thumburg (1774–1857), nobleman
- Ulrike von Levetzow (1804–1899), noblewoman and Goethe's love; lived and died here
