= Carl von Brühl =

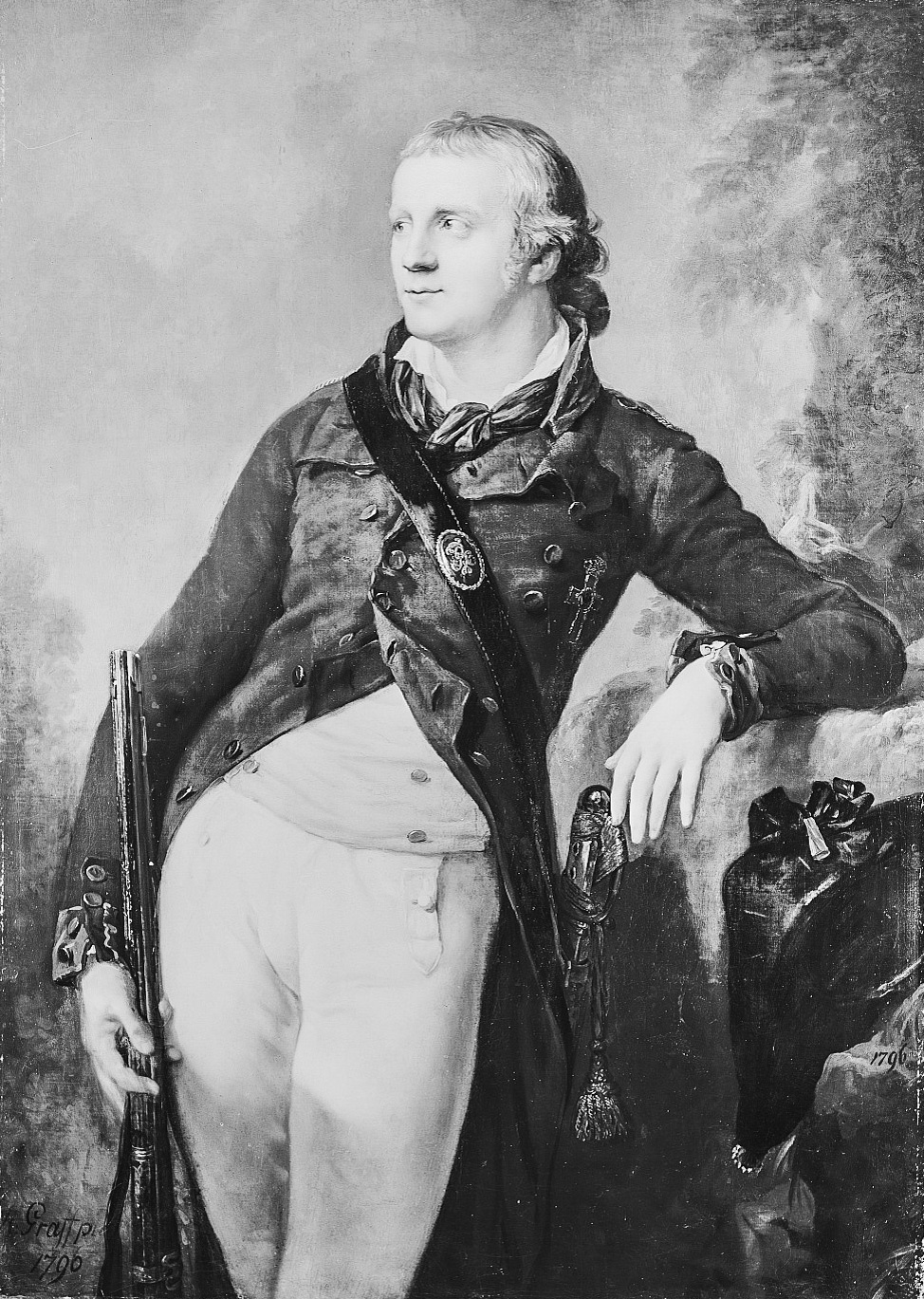
- 1796 portrait by Anton Graff
- Born: 18 May 1772; Pförten, Neumark, Brandenburg-Prussia
- Died: 9 August 1837 (aged 65); Berlin, Prussia

Carl (or Karl) Friedrich Moritz Paul von Brühl (1772–1837) was a friend of Goethe, who, as the Superintendent general of the Prussian royal theatres, was of some importance in the history of the development of the drama in Germany. He was a member of the powerful German von Brühl family.

== Biography ==
In 1830, Brühl was appointed intendant-general of the royal museums.

== Family ==
His father, Hanns Moritz von Brühl, was a colonel in the French service who, upon the 1789 revolution there, left the country to become general inspector of roads in Brandenburg and Pomerania. His mother, Christina Schleyerweber von Brühl, renowned for her beauty and intellectual gifts, was the daughter of a French corporal. Carl von Brühl's paternal grandfather was Heinrich von Brühl, a statesman at the court of Saxony and the Polish–Lithuanian Commonwealth.

His daughter Elisabeth, lady-in-waiting to Queen consort Elisabeth Ludovika of Prussia, was married to general of the cavalry Alfred Bonaventura von Rauch, adjutant general to the German Emperors and in 1862 one of the founders of Berlin's Army Steeplechase in Karlshorst.
