= Theodor Schloepke =

German painter and illustrator (1812–1878)

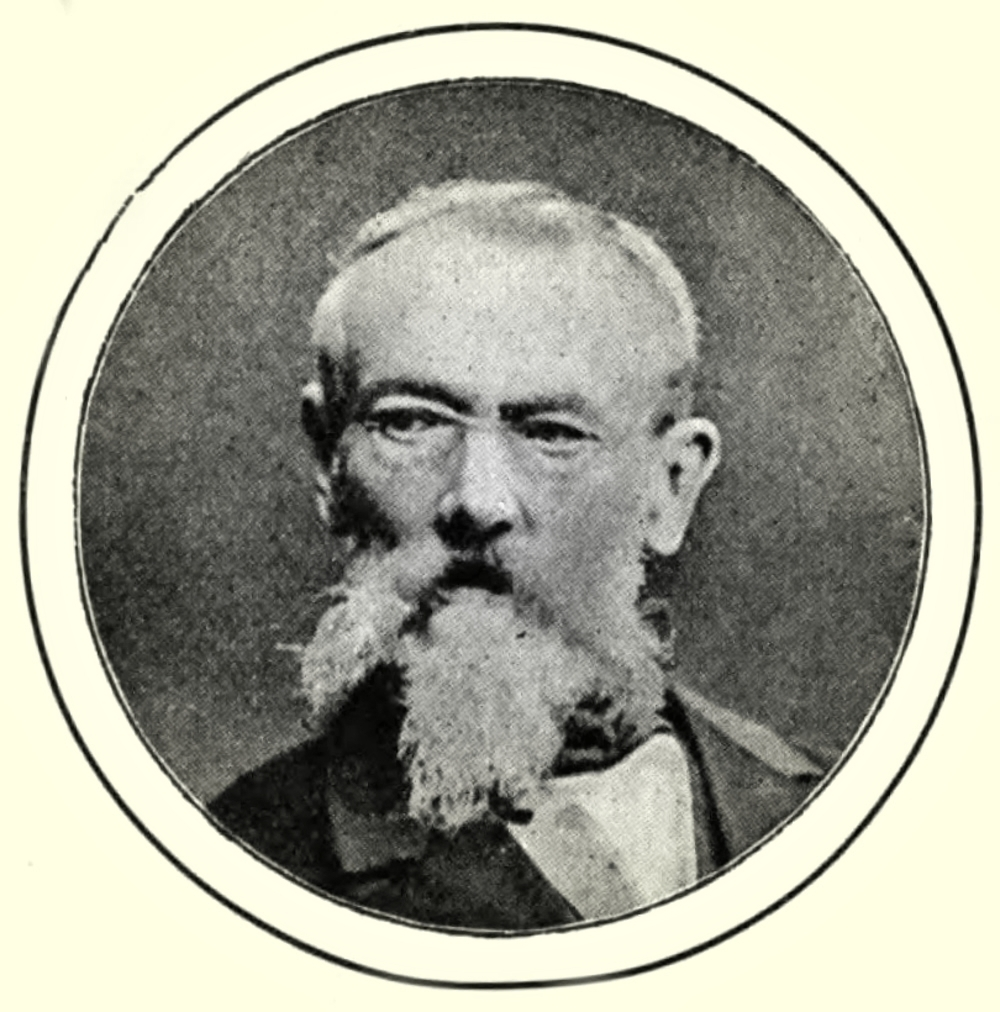
Theodor Schloepke (c. 1875)

Friedrich Theodor Julius Schloepke (6 March 1812 – 13 January 1878) was a German painter and illustrator. He worked in a wide variety of genres, including historical scenes, portraits and landscapes. Many of his paintings feature horses.

== Life and works ==
He was born in Schwerin to Johann Carl Hermann Schloepke (1775–1823), a church organist, and his wife Anna Agnete Christiane, née Schumacher (1782–1819) After becoming orphaned, at the age of eleven, he was raised by an uncle. Initially apprenticed to a bookbinder, his displays of artistic talent led to an apprenticeship with a decorative painter named Michaelsen.

His first professional art lessons came in 1830, at a free weekend school for industrial apprentices, operated by the Masonic lodge. His teachers there were Georg Adolph Demmler and Gaston Lenthe. When he had finished his studies there, he moved to Ludwigslust, where he painted miniature portraits on ivory and pictures of horses. In 1836, he went to Potsdam for further studies with Wilhelm Ternite and Franz Krüger.

He returned to Schwerin and settled there permanently in 1840. the Following year, he married Josephine Feliciane Eliza Lodoiska, née Roza (1814–1874). They had two sons and a daughter. In 1853, he was appointed a court painter and presented with a studio in Schwerin Castle. From 1855 to 1857, he visited Paris on behalf of his patron, Grand Duke Friedrich Franz II, and created works in cooperation with Horace Vernet. In 1863, he was awarded the Knight's Cross of the Saxe-Ernestine House Order.

In addition to his portraits (notably that of Fritz Reuter), he is perhaps best known for his monumental canvas, Niklot's Death, which was shown at several events, including the 1862 International Exhibition in London, and is now in Schwerin Castle.

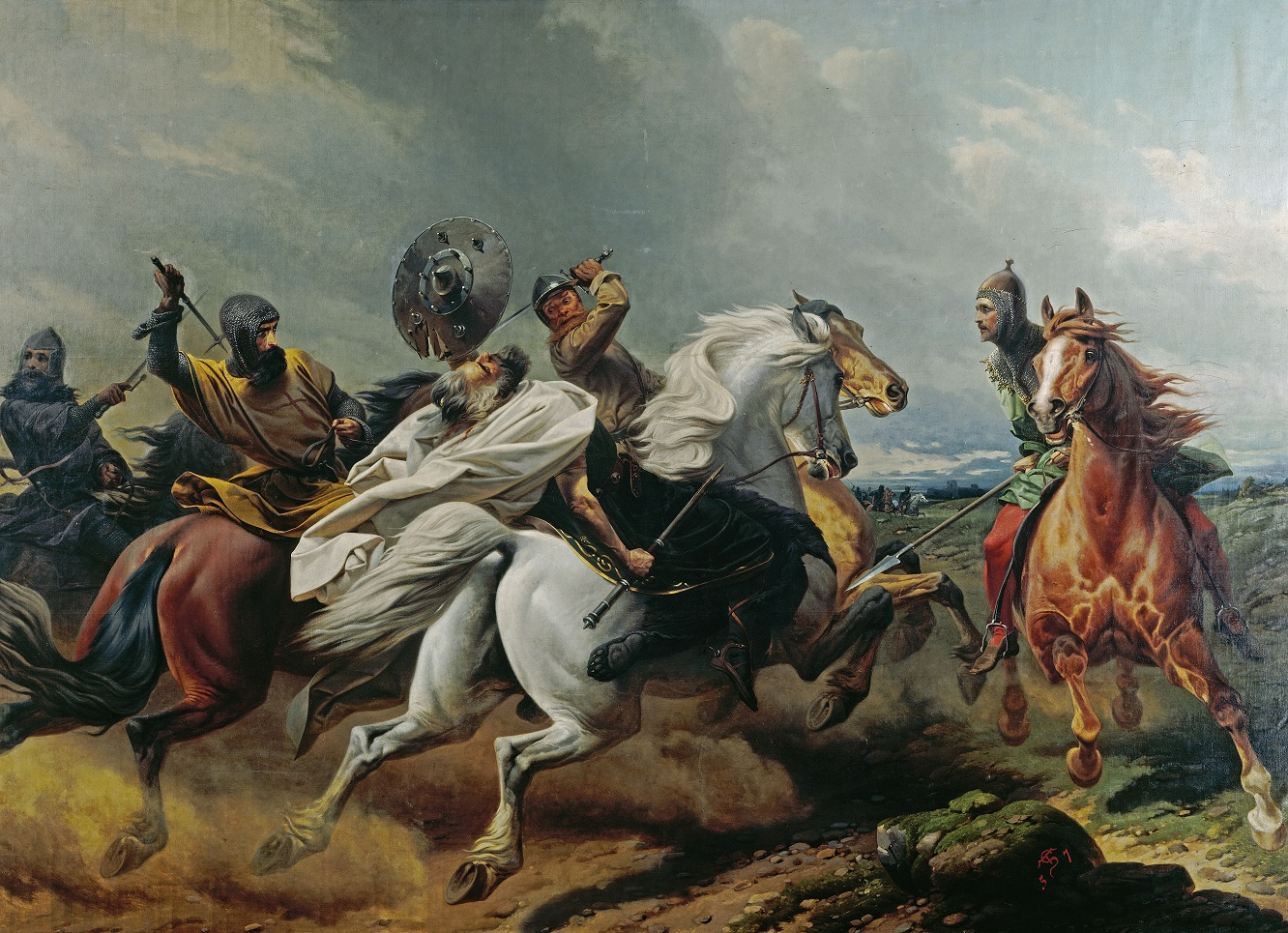
Niklot's Death, 1853–1857, Schwerin Castle

After Josephine's death, he became seriously ill. Despite an extended stay in Italy, his health failed to improve and he died in Schwerin the following year; aged sixty-five.
