= Josef Schretter =

Austrian painter

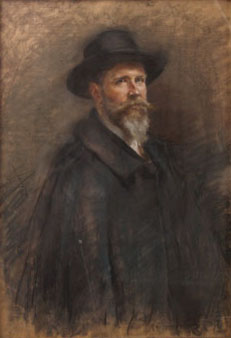
Self-portrait (1906)

Josef Schretter (18 March 1856, Inzing - 18 March 1909, Innsbruck) was painter from Austria-Hungary; specializing in portraits and genre scenes.

== Biography ==
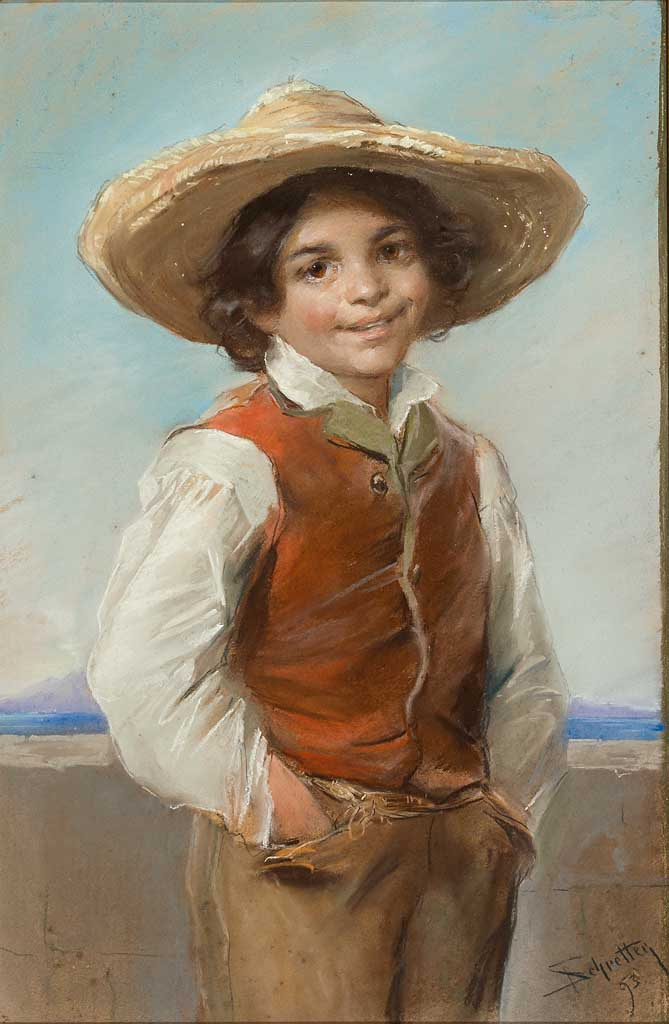
A Neapolitan Scalawag

His father, Peter Paul Schretter, was a teacher and organist. In 1867, he began an apprenticeship with a carver in Thaur, but quit after only a year, to attend an arts and crafts school associated with the Bundesrealgymnasium Innsbruck. After graduating, he became an assistant to the church painter, Franz Plattner in Zirl. From 1874 to 1878, he was enrolled at the Academy of Fine Arts, Vienna, where his primary instructors were Christian Griepenkerl, August Eisenmenger and Karl von Blaas. After 1878, he studied history painting at a private school operated by Leopold Carl Müller.

He passed the teachers' examination for freehand drawing, returned to Innsbruck in 1879, and spent two years teaching at the Bundesrealgymnasium. Between 1881 and 1885, he made study trips to several locations in Italy, and to Tunis, where he devoted himself to painting Orientalist scenes.

From 1886 to 1891, he worked as a portrait painter in Munich. He then settled permanently in Innsbruck, but travelled extensively throughout Northern Europe, to execute works on commission; portraying numerous members of the German, Danish, Dutch and Russian nobilities. In recognition of these achievements he was named a Professor by the Grand Duchy of Mecklenburg-Schwerin.

In 1899, he married Anna Gaisberger, the daughter of a hotelier, and they had two children. In 1907, he acquired the studios belonging to the late landscape painter, Edmund von Wörndle. He died two years later, aged only fifty-three, shortly after being diagnosed with cancer.

Streets in Innsbruck and Inzing have been named after him.

While most of his works are in private collections, some may be seen at the Tyrolean State Museum, the Österreichische Galerie Belvedere and the Staatliches Museum Schwerin.

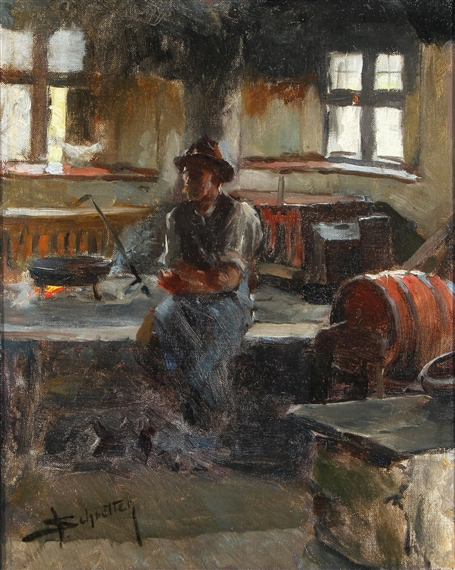
Stoking the Fire
