= Friedrich Wilhelm von Rauch (born 1790) =

Lieutenant general in the Prussian Army

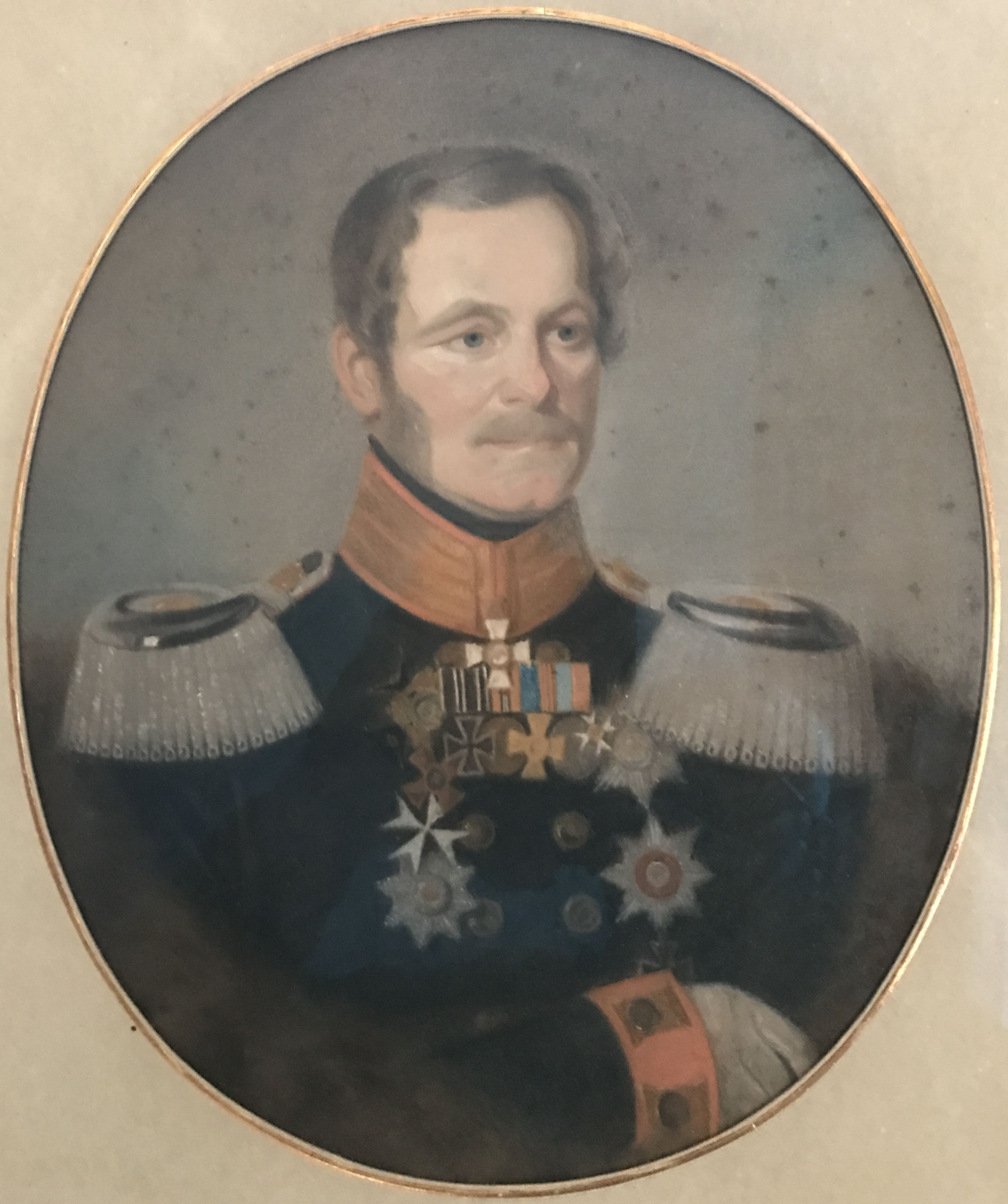
Friedrich Wilhelm von Rauch, pastel sketch from the studio of Franz Krüger, c. 1847

Friedrich Wilhelm von Rauch (15 March 1790 in Potsdam – 9 June 1850 in Berlin) was a lieutenant general in the Prussian Army. Born in Potsdam, he was the son of major general Bonaventura von Rauch and took part in the War of the Fourth Coalition. He served as an adjutant general to King Frederick William IV of Prussia and as Prussia's military attaché at the Russian court of Emperor Nicholas I. He died in Berlin. His restored tomb monument is still there in the Invalids' Cemetery. His sons Alfred Bonaventura and Friedrich Wilhelm von Rauch also became generals.

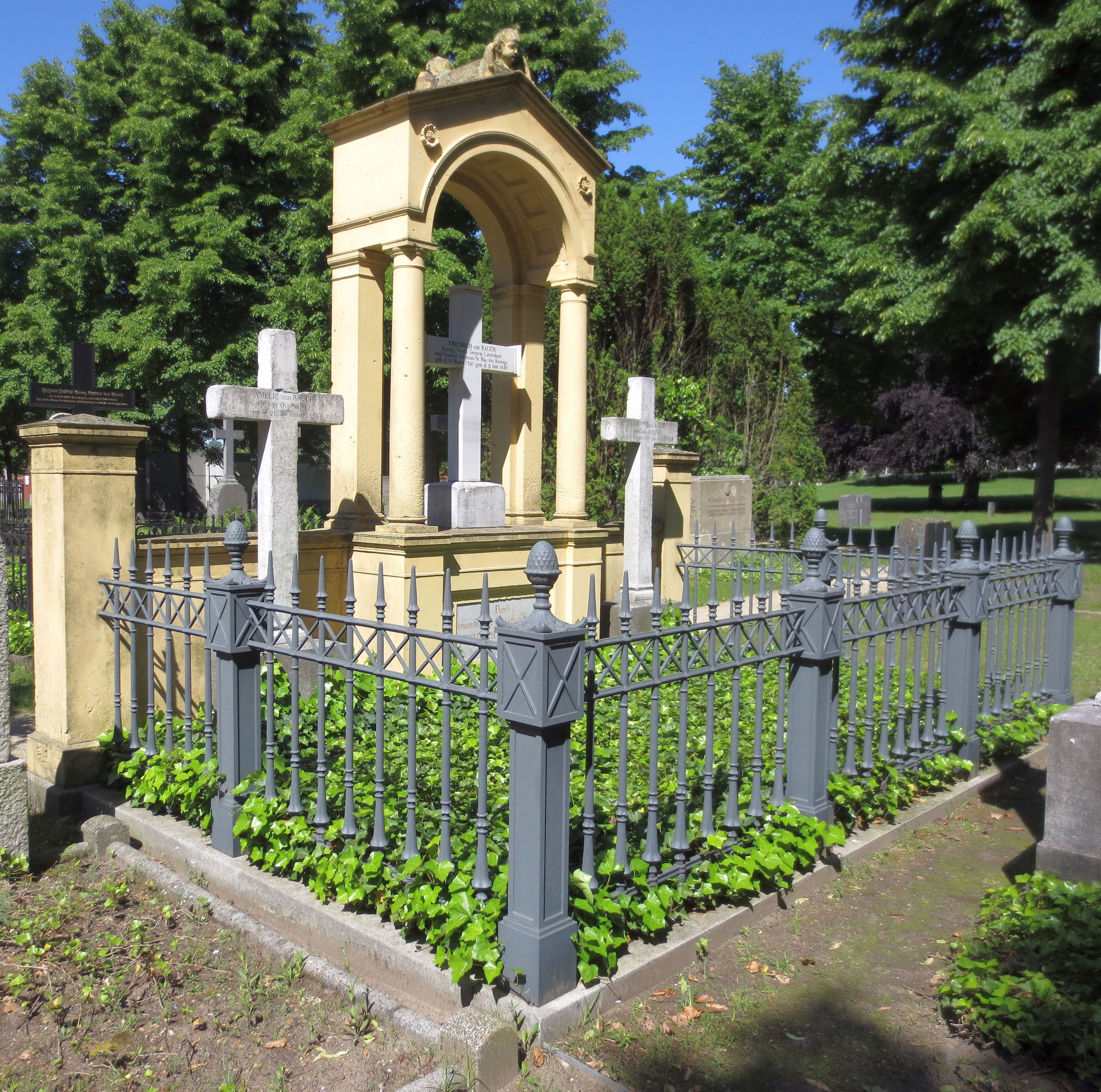
Burial site of Friedrich Wilhelm von Rauch on Berlin's Invalids' Cemetery (commissioned by the Prussian King, created by Friedrich August Stüler)

== Marriage and children ==
Rauch married in 1816 with Laurette Reichsgräfin von Moltke, daughter of Friedrich Detlev Reichsgraf von Moltke, Oberjägermeister to King Frederick William III. of Prussia.
They had seven children:

- Blanka (1817–1905), who married I 1843 Roderich Freiherr Spiegel von und zu Peckelsheim, Prussian Cavalry Captain (Rittmeister) at the Gardes du Corps and II 1854 Wilhelm von Schönermarck, Prussian Colonel; lady-in-waiting to Princess Marie of Prussia, wife of Prince Charles of Prussia
- Elisabeth (Elise) (1820–1909), who married 1855 Count Paul Fersen, Russian Oberjägermeister to Emperor Alexander II; lady-in-waiting to Empress Alexandra Feodorovna
- Marie (1823–1855)
- Alfred Bonaventura (1824–1900), Prussian general of the cavalry, adjutant general to the German Emperors and founder of Berlin's Army Steeplechase in Karlshorst
- Amélie (1825–1850)
- Friedrich Wilhelm (1827–1907), Prussian lieutenant general and commander of the 14th Cavalry Brigade
- Egmont (1829–1875), Prussian colonel and commanding officer of the „Zieten Hussars“ Regiment (Brandenburg) No. 3; founder of the Sächsisch-Thüringische Reit- und Pferdezuchtverein (Equestrian and Horse-Breeding Association of Saxony and Thuringia) and of the horse races in Halle (Saale)

== Bibliography ==
- Gothaisches Adliges Taschenbuch (Gotha Almanac Peerage Paperback), volumes B 1928 (older genealogy), p. 468 et seqq., and 1939, p. 480 et seqq.
- Genealogisches Handbuch des Adels (Almanach de Gotha), volumes B VII (1965), p. 335 et seqq., and B XXI (1995), p. 434 et seqq.
- David E. Barclay: Frederick William IV and the Prussian Monarchy 1840–1861. Oxford: Oxford University Press, 1995, p. 153 et seq.
