= Soldatisches Führertum =

Soldatisches Führertum (Soldiers' Leadership) was a ten-volume reference work in German, containing short biographies of generals in the Prussian Army by Kurt von Priesdorff. Due to the loss of the Prussian Army Archives in World War II, it has become a fundamental source for the biographies of Prussian generals.

== History ==
Johann Friedrich Seyfart had made the first attempt at a systematic catalogue of Prussian generals - as part of the research for his 1767 series of Prussian regimental histories he collected biographies of all these regiments' officers. Priesdorff was a lieutenant and battalion-adjutant in the Grenadier-Regiment „König Friedrich Wilhelm IV.“ (1. Pommersches) Nr. 2, whose commander oberst Georg Bock von Wülfingen commissioned him to create a master-list of the commissioned officers in the history of the regiment.

He completed it in 1906 and his research gave Priesdorff access to the personnel records in the archives of the Geheime Kriegskanzlei (Secret War Chancellery), the Prussian Ministry of War and the Großen Generalstabes. After leaving the Prussian military and civil service, from 1922 Priesdorff was the first (and as it turned out last) military historian to systematically use those archives to research biographies of Prussian generals. From 1937 to 1942 only ten of Priesdorff's planned fifteen volumes were published by the Hanseatische Verlagsanstalt, based in Hamburg. The manuscripts for volumes 11 and 12 had been sent from Hamburg to Leipzig for printing, but these were destroyed by an air-raid on Leipzig, though some pages Priesdorff had held onto survived, as did the manuscripts for volumes 13, 14 and 15.

All the manuscripts for the work were moved to the Geheime Staatsarchiv in Berlin-Dahlem soon after the Second World War. The Bundesarchiv-Militärarchiv wished to publish them, containing as they did around 1300 biographies of Prussian generals between 1908 and 1918. They contacted a publisher and found a new editor in the form of the military writer Hanns Möller-Witten, author of the 1935 Geschichte der Ritter des Ordens pour le mérite and several short biographies. This sequel was to be known as the Neuen Reihe Soldatisches Führertum, but this came to nothing after Möller-Witten's death in 1966.

The personnel records of the Geheime Kriegskanzlei were then in the Prussian Privy State Archives in Berlin-Dahlem, but under the Nazi regime, they were moved to the Heeresarchiv Potsdam (Potsdam Military Archive) in 1936 by Friedrich von Rabenau. They were destroyed there in an air raid in April 1945, leaving Priesdorff's work as the most important source on the topic. The publisher also issued a 231-page index to volumes 1 to 8, including a short index of all generals and an index of the names of all other figures. In 1980 the Militärgeschichtliches Institut of the DDR in Potsdam issued another register of the names in Priesdorff's volumes.
