= Adolf Heinrich Lier =

German painter

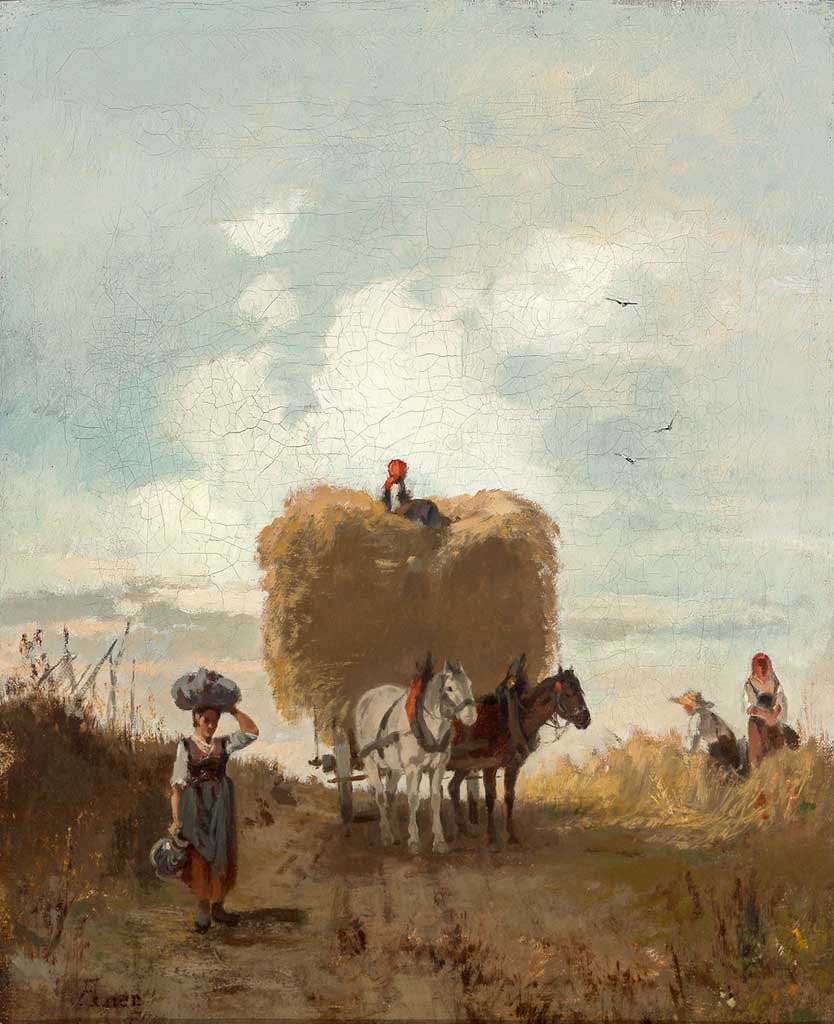
Harvest Time

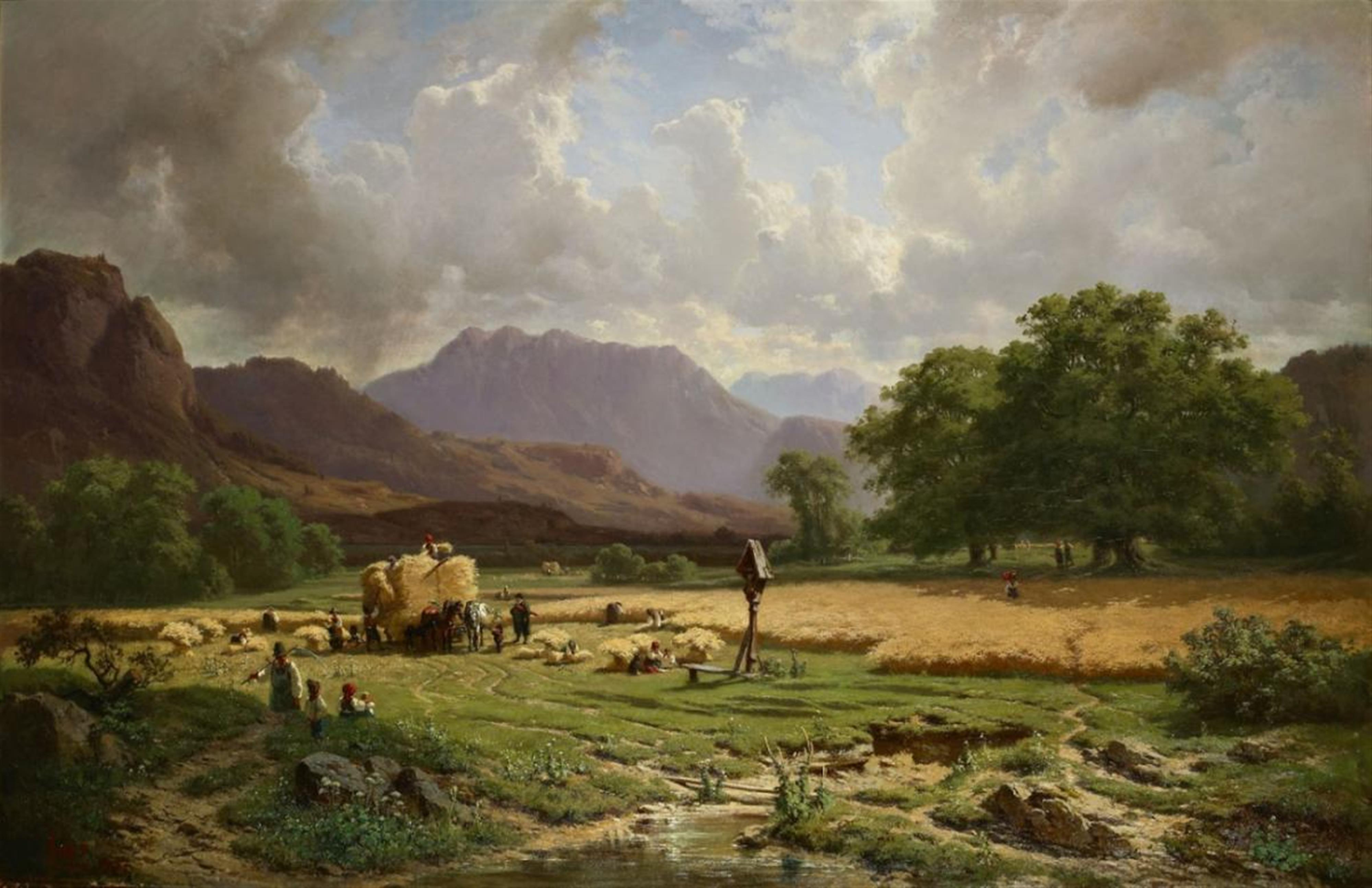
Grain Harvest in the Mountains (1857)

Adolf Heinrich Lier (21 May 1826 – 30 September 1882) was a German landscape painter.

== Life and work ==
He was born in Herrnhut as the son of a goldsmith from Mecklenburg. At the age of fifteen (after a problematic youth that included three years in a reformatory) he expressed a desire to be a painter but his father opposed the idea, sending him instead to the construction tradeschools in Zittau and Dresden to study draftsmanship. He was able to gain a short-term position in the studios of Gottfried Semper while he was in Dresden.

In 1848, he received a commission to help prepare designs for a museum ceiling in Basel, under the direction of Melchior Berri. This type of work proved to be unsatisfying, however, and he was encouraged to go to Munich for further studies. After failing to obtain a position in the studios of Joseph Karl Stieler, he encountered Richard Zimmermann, who he knew from Zittau, and became his pupil. He decided to specialize in landscape painting and held his first exhibit in 1855. Initially, he focused on the Alps and Upper Bavarian lakes.

In 1861 he took a trip to Paris, where he had his first encounter with the Barbizon School. This confirmed him in his belief that landscapes should be natural, focus on overall effect rather than detail, and be what one might now call "deceptively simple". In 1864 he returned to Paris, where he spent his time copying the old masterpieces in the Louvre. He was especially interested in the work of Jules Dupré, and visited with him in L'Isle-Adam that winter. In 1868 he opened an art school which he operated until 1873, when his health began to decline, due to a heart condition. After that time he continued to teach, but took a much less active role in the school.

Hoping to find some rest and recovery, he planned to spend the winter of 1882 in the South Tyrol, but died of a heart attack in Vahrn shortly after arriving.
