= Ulrike von Levetzow =

German aristocrat and Goethe's lover (1804–1899)

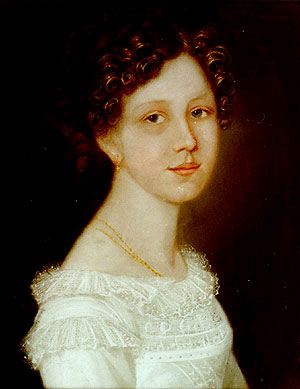
1821 portrait

Theodore Ulrike Sophie von Levetzow, known as Baroness Ulrike von Levetzow (4 February 1804 – 13 November 1899), was a friend and the last love of Johann Wolfgang von Goethe.

== Life ==
She was born in Leipzig in Saxony, the daughter of the ducal Mecklenburg-Schwerin chamberlain and later Hofmarschall Joachim Otto Ulrich von Levetzow and his wife Amalie. The seventeen-year-old girl first met Goethe in 1821 at Mariánské Lázně and again at Karlovy Vary and at Loket in 1822 and 1823. The poet, then 72, was so carried away with her wit and beauty that he thought for a time of marrying her and urged Grand Duke Karl August of Saxe-Weimar-Eisenach to ask for her hand in his name. Rejected, he left for Thuringia and addressed to her the poems which he afterward called Trilogie der Leidenschaft. These poems include the famous "Marienbad Elegy".

Ulrike later confessed she was not prepared to marry and angrily denied a liaison with Goethe. Nevertheless, she remained unmarried all her life. She died at the age of 95 at Třebívlice Castle in Bohemia, which she inherited after the death of her mother.

== Legacy ==
Goethe's infatuation with Ulrike is the subject of Martin Walser's novel A Man in Love, published in 2008.

== Sources ==
- Suphan, Goethe Jahrbuch, volume xxi (Frankfort, 1900)
- Kirschoer, Erinnerungen an Goethes Ulrike und an die Familie von Levetzow-Rauch (Aussig, 1904)
