= Marienbad Elegy =

Poem by Johann Wolfgang von Goethe

The "Marienbad Elegy" (German: Marienbader Elegie) is a poem by Johann Wolfgang von Goethe. It is named after the spa town of Marienbad (now Mariánské Lázně) where Goethe, 72-years-old, spent the summer of 1821. There he fell madly in love with the 17-year-old Ulrike von Levetzow. Goethe returned to Marienbad in the summer of 1823 to celebrate his birthday. On that occasion, he asked Ulrike's mother, via his friend, Karl August, Grand Duke of Saxe-Weimar-Eisenach, to marry Ulrike. Her declinal threw Goethe into deep suffering, which he lays open in a deeply personal poem. It is praised for its emotional intensity and poignancy.

== Analysis ==
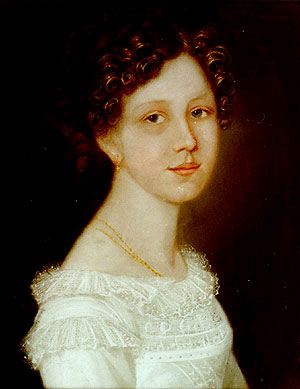
Ulrike von Levetzow, 1821

This poem, considered one of Goethe's finest and most personal, reflects the devastating sadness the poet felt when his proposal for marriage was declined. He started writing the poem on 5 September 1823 in a coach which carried him from Eger (now Cheb) to Weimar and by his arrival on 12 September, it was finished. He showed it only to his closest friends.

Mir ist das All, ich bin mir selbst verloren,
Der ich noch erst den Göttern Liebling war;
Sie prüften mich, verliehen mir Pandoren,
So reich an Gütern, reicher an Gefahr;
Sie drängten mich zum gabeseligen Munde,
Sie trennen mich, und richten mich zugrunde.

To me is all, I to myself am lost,
Who the immortals' fav'rite erst was thought;
They, tempting, sent Pandoras to my cost,
So rich in wealth, with danger far more fraught;
They urged me to those lips, with rapture crown'd,
Deserted me, and hurl'd me to the ground.

Goethe never returned to Bohemia. He died in Weimar in 1832.
