= Rauch =

Rauch (meaning "smoke" or "fume" in German, perhaps an occupational name for a blacksmith or charcoal burner) may refer to:

== People with the surname ==
- Adolf von Rauch (born 1798) (1798–1882), German paper manufacturer
- Adolf von Rauch (born 1805) (1805–1877), German cavalry officer, chamberlain and court-marshal to Princess Louise of Prussia, and chairman of the Numismatic Society in Berlin
- Albert von Rauch (1829–1901), German general of the infantry
- Alfred de Rauch (1887–1985), French ice hockey player
- Alfred Bonaventura von Rauch (1824–1900), German general of the cavalry, adjutant general to the German Emperors and founder of Berlin‘s Army Steeplechase
- Bill Rauch (born 1962), American theater director
- Bob Rauch
- Bonaventura von Rauch (1740–1814), Prussian Army major general
- Christian Daniel Rauch (1777–1857), German sculptor
- Daniel Rauch
- Dick Rauch
- Doug Rauch
- Earl Mac Rauch
- Egmont von Rauch (1829–1875), German cavalry officer and later colonel in the Prussian Army
- Erik Rauch
- Erwin Rauch
- Fedor von Rauch (1822–1892), German cavalry officer in the Prussian Army, chief equerry to the German Emperors, and vice-president of the Union Club in Berlin
- Felicitas Rauch (born 1996), German footballer
- František Rauch
- Franz Rauch
- Fred Rauch
- Frederick Augustus Rauch
- Friedrich von Rauch (born 1855) (1855–1935), Prussian general of the cavalry
- Friedrich Wilhelm von Rauch (born 1790) (1790–1850), German lieutenant general, adjutant general to King Frederick William IV of Prussia and military attaché at the court of Emperor Nicholas I of Russia
- Friedrich Wilhelm von Rauch (born 1827) (1827–1907), German lieutenant general in the Prussian Army
- Friedrich Wilhelm von Rauch (born 1868)(1868-1899), German first lieutenant in the Prussian Army and Military Governor of Emperor William II's sons
- Federico Rauch
- Georg von Rauch (historian) (1904–1991), Baltic-German historian
- George W. Rauch (1876–1940), American politician
- Gustav von Rauch (1774–1841), Prussian general of the infantry and Minister of War from 1837 to 1841, honorary citizen of Berlin
- Gustav Waldemar von Rauch (1819–1890), German general of the cavalry in the Prussian Army
- Hans Rauch (1899–1958)
- Harry Rauch (1925–1979), American mathematician
- Heinz Rauch
- Helmut Rauch
- Irmengard Rauch (1933–2025), American linguist and semiotician
- Isabelle Rauch (born 1968), French politician
- Jamie Rauch
- Janette Rauch
- Jasen Rauch American musician
- Jeffrey Rauch
- Johann Georg Rauch (composer) (1658–1710), German composer and organist at Strasbourg Cathedral
- Johann Georg Rauch (politician) (1789–1851), Swiss politician and playing card manufacturer
- Johannes Rauch
- John Rauch (architect) (1930–2022), American architect, member of Venturi, Rauch & Scott Brown
- John Rauch, former head coach of the Oakland Raiders and Buffalo Bills
- John Henry Rauch
- John T. Rauch
- Jonathan Rauch (born 1960), American journalist
- Jon Rauch (born 1978), baseball pitcher for the New York Mets
- Laurika Rauch, South African singer
- Leopold von Rauch (1787–1860), German general in the Prussian Army
- Levin Rauch (1819–1890), Hungarian politician and viceroy of Croatia-Slavonia
- Marshall Rauch, American businessman and North Carolina politician
- Martin Rauch
- Madeleine de Rauch, French Haute Couture fashion designer; see Marc Bohan
- Meir Rauch
- Melissa Rauch, American actress
- Neo Rauch (born 1960), German painter
- Nikolaus von Rauch (1851–1904), German colonel and cavalry officer in the Prussian Army
- Otton Egorovich Rauch
- Paul Rauch
- Robert L. "Nob" Rauch (born 1958), flying disc sports administrator
- Rosalie von Rauch (1820–1879), second, morganatic wife to Prince Albert of Prussia (as Countess of Hohenau)
- Rudolf Rauch
- Sandra Rauch (born 1967), German artist
- Scott L. Rauch
- Sebastian Rauch
- Sibylle Rauch (born 1960), German actress and model
- Siegfried Rauch
- Stephan Rauch
- Walter Rauch
- Wendelin Rauch

== Places ==
- Rauch, Buenos Aires, the cabecera (district capital) of Rauch partido
- Rauch Partido, a partido (department) in Buenos Aires Province, Argentina
- Rauch, Minnesota, an unincorporated community in northern Minnesota, United States

== Other ==
- Rauch (company), an Austrian company that produces iced tea, juices and sports drinks
- Rauch (crater), a crater on Mars named after the Argentine partido
- "Rauch", a song from the album In Silence We Yearn by Oh Hiroshima
