= Wilhelm Graf von Hohenau =

German equestrian

Olympic medal record

Men's Equestrian
Bronze medal – third place	1912 Stockholm	Team jumping

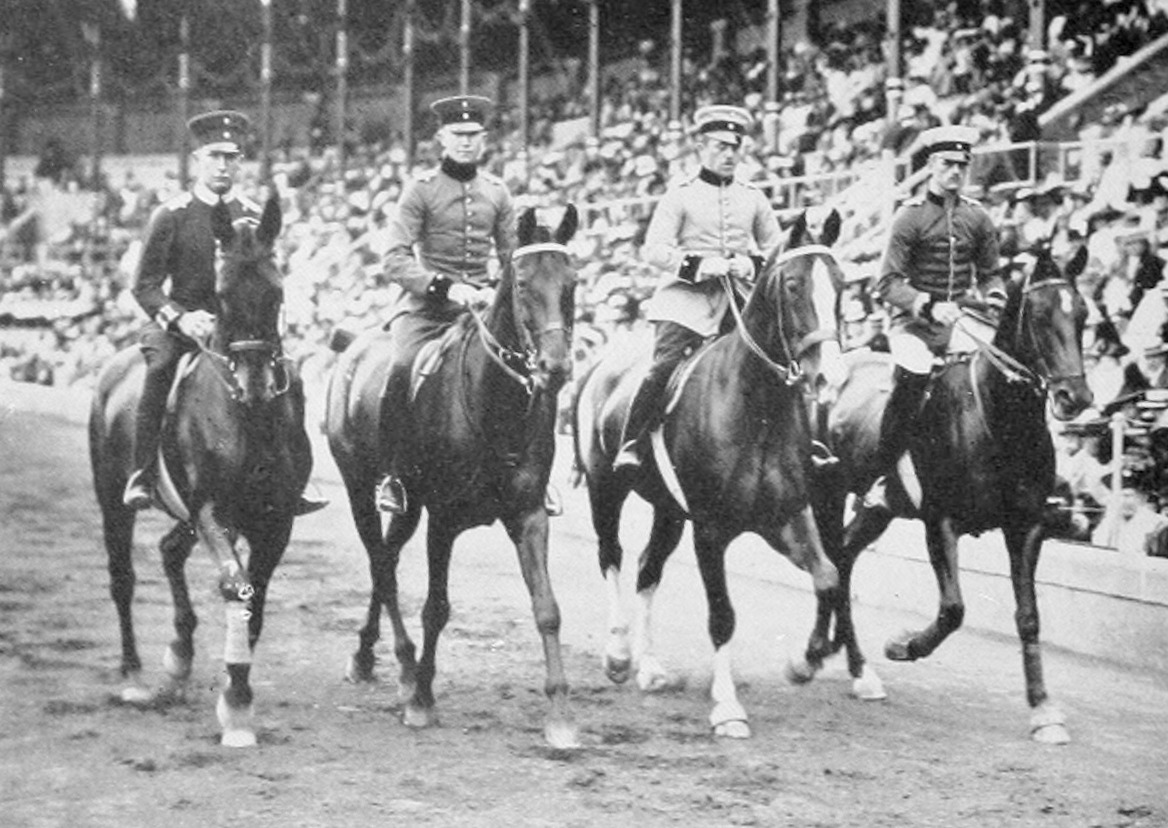
Count Wilhelm of Hohenau; Sigismund Freyer; Ernst Deloch; Prince Friedrich Karl of Prussia (from right to left): Germany´s bronze equestrian team at the 1912 Summer Olympics in Stockholm

Wilhelm Graf von Hohenau (27 November 1884, Berlin – 11 April 1957, Hamburg) was a German horse rider who competed in the 1912 Summer Olympics.

== Early life ==
He was the second son of Count Frederick of Hohenau and his wife, Charlotte von der Decken (1863-1933). Paternally, he was a grandson of Prince Albrecht of Prussia and his morganatic second wife Rosalie von Rauch. This relation made him second cousin of Emperor Wilhelm II.

== Equestrian ==
He won the bronze medal in the equestrian team jumping event. Furthermore, between 1920 and 1933, he won 227 tournaments throughout Europe.

== Personal life ==
On 20 May 1916, he married Countess Anna Wanda Sara Ellinor Henckel von Donnersmarck (1894-1946), daughter of Count Hugo III Henckel von Donnersmarck (1857-1923) and Anna von Fabrice (1854-1905). They had one daughter and one son:

- Countess Charlotte Elisabeth Hedwig Wilhelmine Rosalie Sara Anna Lori von Hohenau (b.1917)
- Count Albrecht Wilhelm Friedrich Carl Hugo Eberhard Max von Hohenau (1919-1940)

After divorcing his first wife, he married secondly Ellen Retemeyer-Ketschendorf (b. 1898) on 24 Mar 1932. She was also previously married to sculptor Kurt Conrad Karl Edzard (1890-1972).

== Ancestry ==
Ancestors of Wilhelm Graf von Hohenau

16. Frederick William II of Prussia
8. Frederick William III of Prussia
17. Landgravine Frederika Louisa of Hesse-Darmstadt
4. Prince Albert of Prussia
18. Charles II, Grand Duke of Mecklenburg-Strelitz
9. Duchess Louise of Mecklenburg-Strelitz
19. Princess Friederike of Hesse-Darmstadt
2. Count Frederick of Hohenau
20. Bonaventura von Rauch
10. Gustav von Rauch
21. Johanna Justine Eleonore Bandel
5. Rosalie von Rauch
22. Georg Friedrich von Holtzendorff
11. Rosalie von Holtzendorff
23. Rudolphine Wilhelmine von Lütke
1. Count Wilhelm of Hohenau
24. Klaus von der Decken
12. Ernst Carl von der Decken
25. Wilhelmine Charlotte Juliane Sophie von Hanstein
6. Julius von der Decken
26. Friedrich Ludwig von Stechow
13. Adelheid von Stechow
27. Karoline von der Recke
3. Charlotte von der Decken
28. Leopold von Kleist
14. Count Eduard von Kleist-Zützen
29. Friederike Auguste von Klitzing
7. Anna Hedwig von Kleist
30. Hans Heinrich VI, Count of Hochberg, Baron of Fürstenstein
15. Countess Luise of Hochberg
31. Princess Anna Emilie of Anhalt-Köthen-Pless
