= Adolf von Rauch (born 1805) =

Cavalry officer in the Prussian Army

- Gustav Adolf von Rauch
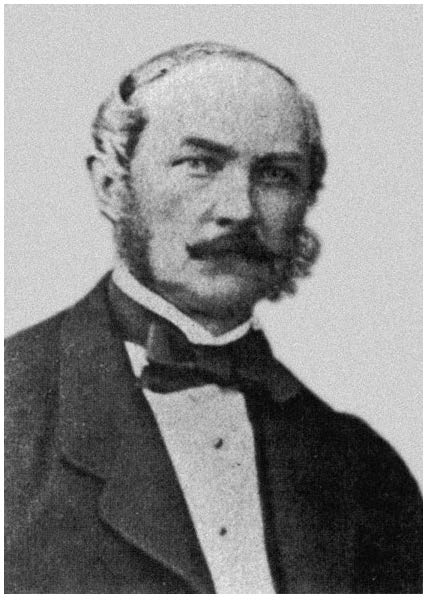
- Born: 25 August 1805; Potsdam, Margraviate of Brandenburg
- Died: 26 June 1877 (aged 71); Baden-Baden, German Empire
- Education: Joachimsthal Gymnasium
- Spouse: Therese von Ziegler
- Children: 7
- Relatives: Gustav von Rauch (father); Fedor von Rauch (brother); Rosalie von Rauch (sister); Prince Albert of Prussia (brother-in-law); Gustav Waldemar von Rauch (brother); Albert von Rauch (brother)
- Military career
- Allegiance: Prussia
- Branch: Prussian Army
- Rank: Major
- Unit: Gardes du Corps

Gustav Adolf von Rauch (25 August 1805 – 26 June 1877) was a German military officer, hofmarschall, and numismatist.

Rauch retired in 1854 as a cavalry officer with the rank of major in the Prussian Gardes du Corps regiment, to act as chamberlain and court-marshall to Princess Louise of Prussia, wife of Alexis, Landgrave of Hesse-Philippsthal-Barchfeld, who had been divorced since 1861, in the following decades at Berlin's Monbijou Palace. Rauch was a distinguished collector of ancient Greek and Roman coins and from 1870 to 1877 served as the chairman of the Numismatic Society in Berlin.

== Life ==
=== Family ===
Adolf von Rauch was born in Potsdam as the eldest son to Gustav von Rauch, later Prussian Minister of War, general of the infantry and honorary citizen of Berlin, and his first wife Caroline, née von Geusau.

His brother Fedor became Chief Equerry to the German Emperors, his sister Rosalie Countess of Hohenau, née von Rauch the second, morganatic wife to Prince Albert of Prussia, youngest brother of King Frederick William IV and Emperor William I. His brothers Gustav Waldemar and Albert rose to Prussian generals.

=== Guard officer and chamberlain ===
From 1822 to 1854, he was a Prussian cavalry officer in the Gardes du Corps regiment. Since 1842 commander of its Charlottenburg squadron opposite the royal palace, he retired from military service in 1854 with the rank of major. The same year he became chamberlain and court-marshal to Princess Louise of Prussia, daughter of Prince Charles of Prussia and his wife Princess Marie, Princess of Saxe-Weimar-Eisenach, both siblings of the first German emperor resp. empress. Princess Louise´s marriage to Alexis, Landgrave of Hesse-Philippsthal-Barchfeld was divorced in 1861.

=== Numismatist and collector ===
Rauch graduated from Berlin´s Joachimsthalsches Gymnasium. Adolf von Rauch´s interests went far beyond his service as a guard officer. By Benoni Friedländer, an outstanding numismatic expert and collector, he was introduced to numismatics as a scholarly discipline. Even during his service as an officer and chamberlain he developed as a knowledgeable and notable collector of ancient Greek and Roman coins. 50 selected coins from Rauch´s collection were presented in a special publication in 1843 by the numismatist Bernhard von Koehne, soon after director at the Hermitage Museum in Saint Petersburg. On initiative of Julius Friedländer, Benoni Friedländer´s son and first director of Berlin´s Münzkabinett, many of Adolf von Rauch´s coins became part of the collection of this new museum. Today, the Münzkabinett is one of the Berlin State Museums. As a renowned numismatist he continuously published scientific essays.

Together with general Prince Wilhelm Radziwiłł and Bernhard Karl von Koehne, Adolf von Rauch was one of the founders of the Numismatic Society in Berlin, the first German numismatic association (comparable with the Royal Numismatic Society). From 1870 to 1877 he was its chairman.

The Antiquarische Gesellschaft in Zürich (Antiquarian Society of Zurich) had awarded him its honorary membership.

== Marriage and issue ==
Rauch married in 1836 to Therese von Ziegler (1817–1857). The couple had seven children, four of them died young.

The three surviving sons followed the family tradition and took up an officer career:

- Son Leopold von Rauch (1838–1870) fell as a Prussian captain and company commander in the 3rd Foot Guards regiment at the Battle of Gravelotte during the Franco-Prussian War.
- Son Adolf ("Aze") von Rauch (1843–1926), as a body page to the Prussian Prince regent William, was in the royal entourage at his coronation ceremony as Prussian King in 1861. He retired as a lieutenant colonel of the cavalry.
- The youngest son Gustav von Rauch (1856–1931) was forced by chronic illness to live as a Rittmeister in Berlin´s Invalidenhaus of the Prussian army (comparable with Royal Hospital Chelsea). His grave in the Invalids' Cemetery still exists today.

Adolf von Rauch succumbed to longstanding illness in Baden-Baden in 1877.

== Bibliography ==
- Genealogisches Handbuch des Adels (Almanach de Gotha). C. A. Starke, Marburg. volumes B VII. (1965), p. 335, und B XXI (1995), p. 434.
- Julius Friedländer: Nekrolog. Adolf von Rauch. In: Zeitschrift für Numismatik. Vol. 5, 1878, p. 217 et seqq.
- Roland Berbig: Theodor Fontane Chronik. Vol. 2: 1858–1870. Walter de Gruyter Verlag, Berlin, 2010, ISBN 978-3-11-018910-0, p. 1508.
