= Invalids' Cemetery =

Cemetery in Berlin, Germany

Invalidenfriedhof
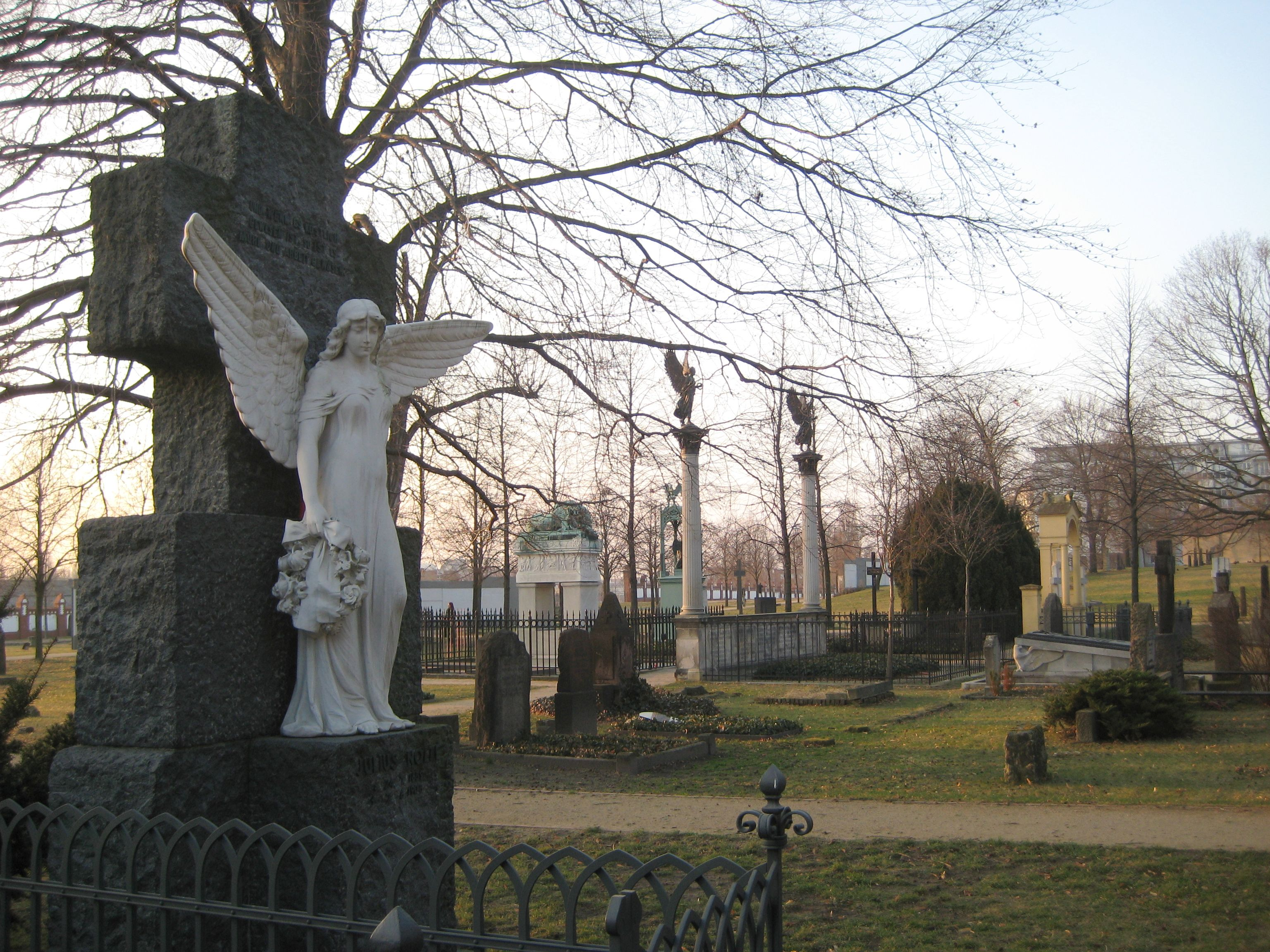
- Interactive map of Invalidenfriedhof

Details
- Established: 1748
- Location: Scharnhorststraße 25; Oranienburger Vorstadt, quarter Mitte, Berlin
- Country: Germany
- Coordinates: 52°31′55″N 13°22′16″E
- Type: Veterans
- No. of graves: c. 230 preserved
- Find a Grave: Invalidenfriedhof

The Invalids' Cemetery (German: Invalidenfriedhof) is one of the oldest cemeteries in Berlin. It was the traditional resting place of the Prussian Army, and is regarded as particularly important as a memorial to the German Wars of Liberation of 1813–15.

== History ==
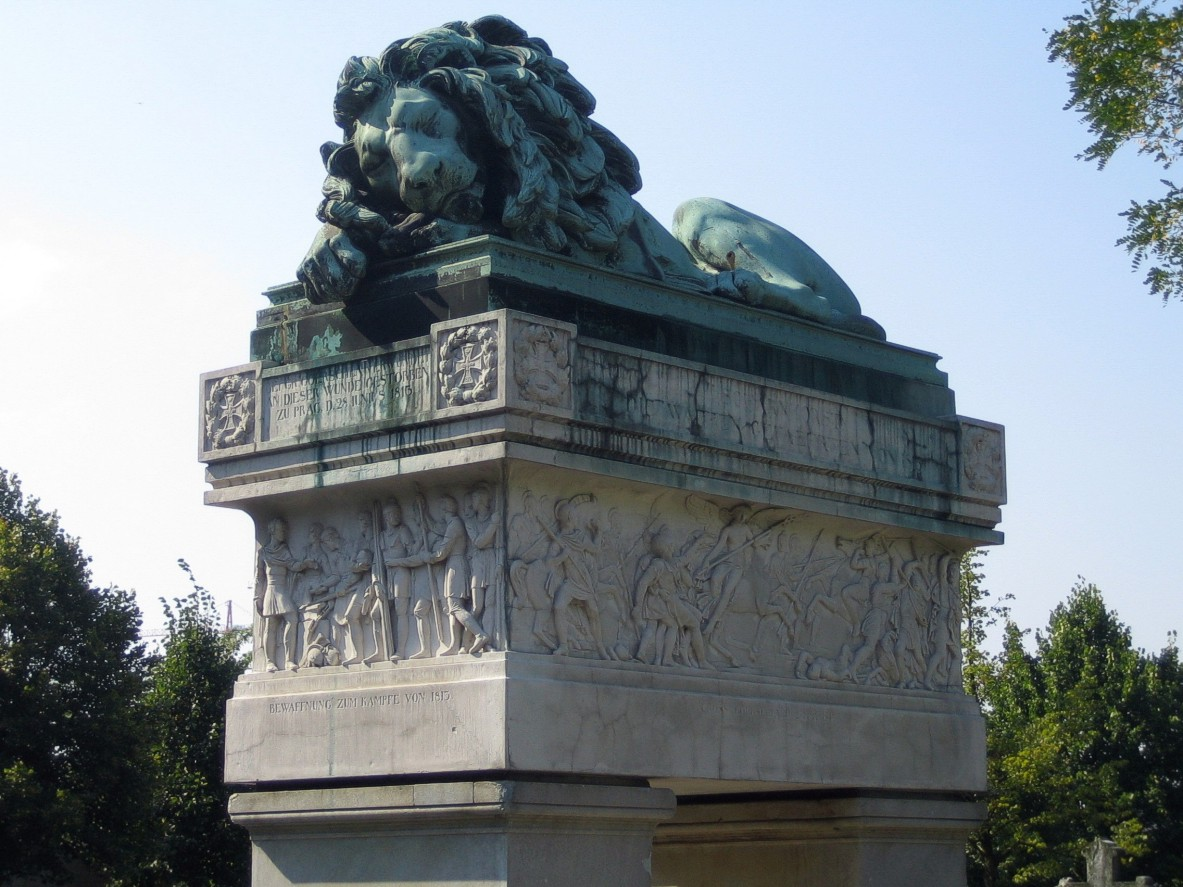
Tomb of General von Scharnhorst

The cemetery was established in 1748 to provide burial grounds for those veterans wounded in the War of the Austrian Succession, who inhabited a nearby hostel (Invalidenhaus) built on the orders of King Frederick the Great. A royal decree of 1824 declared that the Invalidenfriedhof should become the burial ground for all distinguished Prussian military personnel, including Bogislav Count Tauentzien von Wittenberg. One of the most notable tombs from this period is that of Gerhard von Scharnhorst (a hero of the Napoleonic Wars), designed by Schinkel with a sculpture of a slumbering lion cast out of captured cannon by Rauch. The cemetery was also the resting place of the soldiers killed during the Revolutions of 1848 in the German states. By 1872, approximately 18,000 funerals had taken place in the cemetery.

Numerous commanders and officers who fought in World War I, such as Max Hoffmann, Helmuth von Moltke, Ludwig von Falkenhausen and Karl von Bülow, were buried in the cemetery, along with several high-ranking members of the Freikorps. The body of Manfred von Richthofen (the 'Red Baron') was transferred to the cemetery in 1925 from his original grave in France. During the Weimar Republic, high-ranking military personnel such as Hans von Seeckt continued to be buried in the cemetery, but approximately half the graves were gardened over in this period.

During the Nazi regime, a number of senior figures were buried in the Invalid's Cemetery, including former Army Supreme Commander Werner von Fritsch, fighter ace Werner Mölders, Luftwaffe commander Ernst Udet, Munitions Minister Fritz Todt, Reichsprotector of Bohemia and Moravia Reinhard Heydrich, Field Marshal Walter von Reichenau, Colonel General Curt Haase, Colonel General Hans Hube and General Rudolf Schmundt, who was an adjutant to Adolf Hitler killed in the 20 July plot by the bomb intended for Hitler. After World War II, the Allies ordered that all Nazi monuments (including those in cemeteries) should be removed, and this resulted in the removal of the grave-markers of Heydrich and Todt, although their remains were not disinterred.

In May 1951, the East Berlin city council closed the cemetery off to the public so that repairs and restoration could be carried out, and to prevent any further damage of the graves. Since it lay close to the Berlin Wall, in the 1960s over a third of the cemetery was destroyed to make way for watch towers, troop barracks, roads and parking lots. Some of the graves were damaged by gunfire from soldiers guarding the wall.

The degradation of the cemetery continued in the 1970s, when soldiers stationed nearby began to use abandoned or damaged gravestones to build shelters in case of bad weather. It was probably only the fact that the cemetery contained the graves of German freedom fighters like Scharnhorst, regarded by the East German National People's Army as its forerunners, that prevented its total destruction.

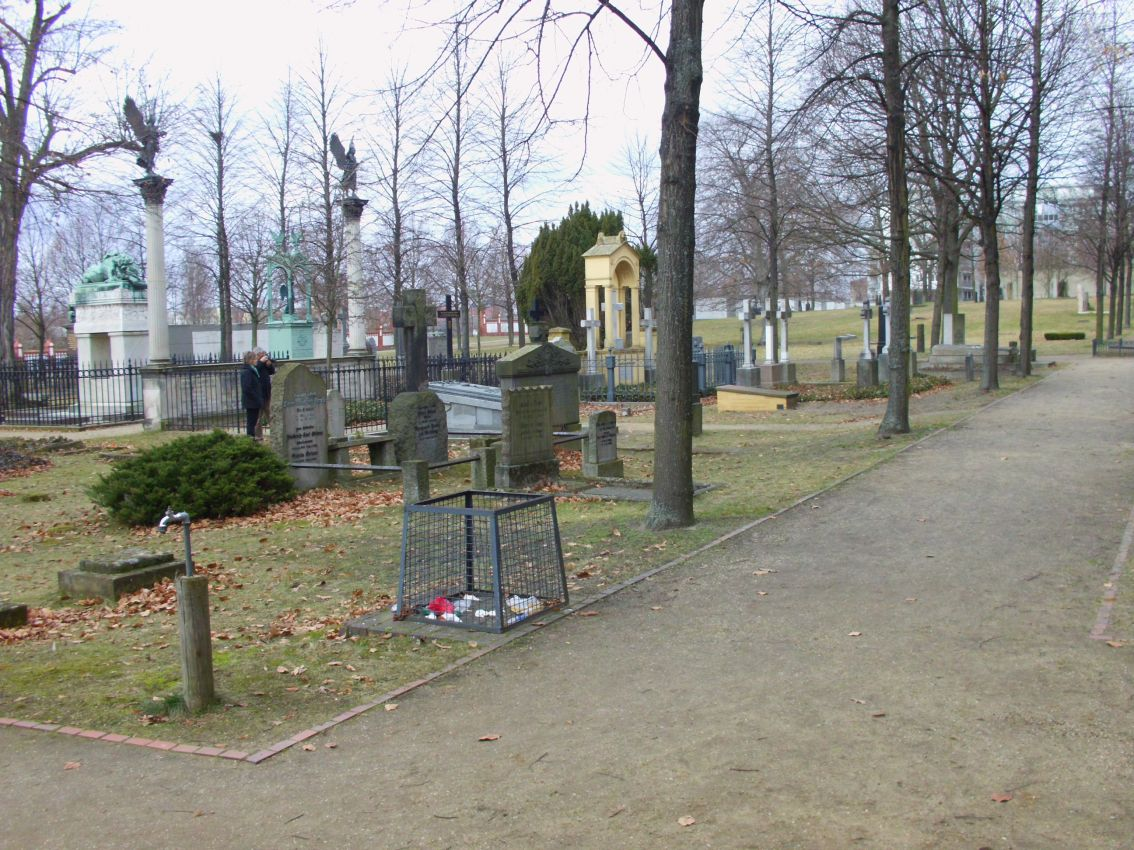
Looking west to the Graves of Scharnhorst, Boyen and the Rauch family

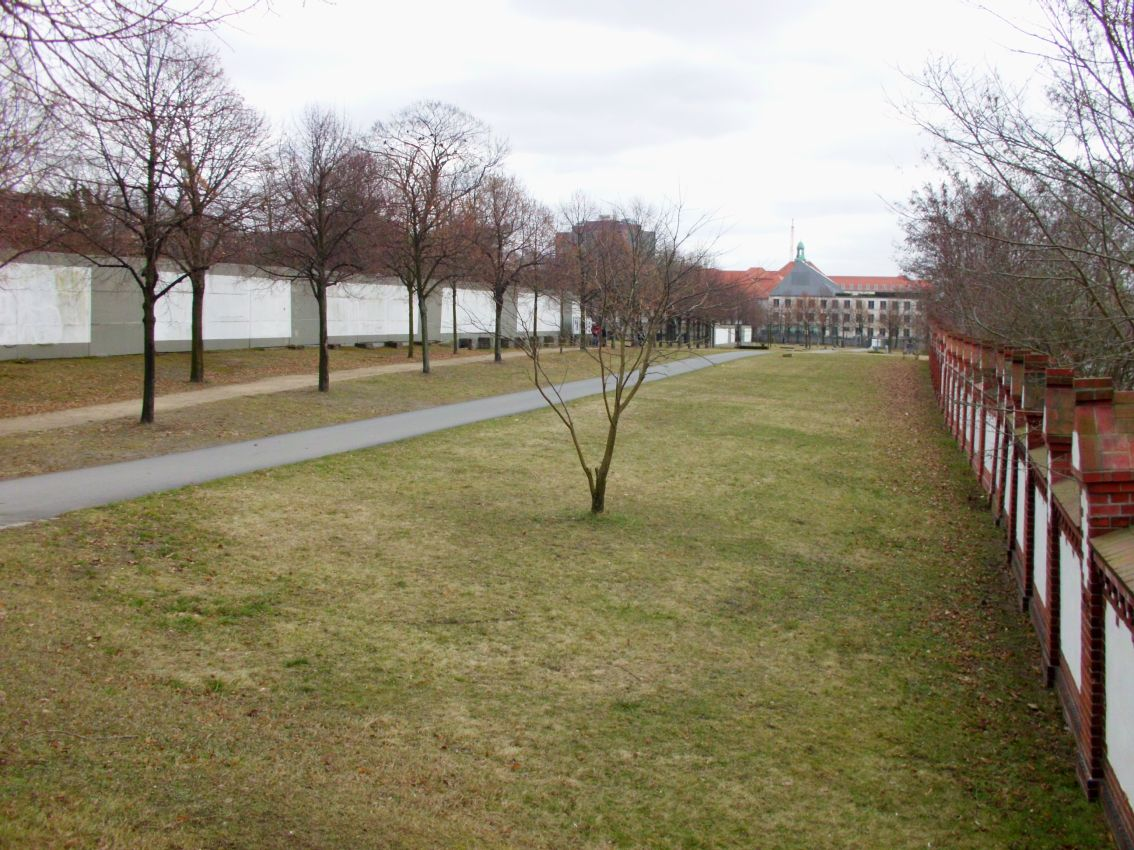
Former death zone (Todesstreifen) in the cemetery with the rest of the Berlin Wall (Hinterlandmauer – left), right: the western wall of the cemetery

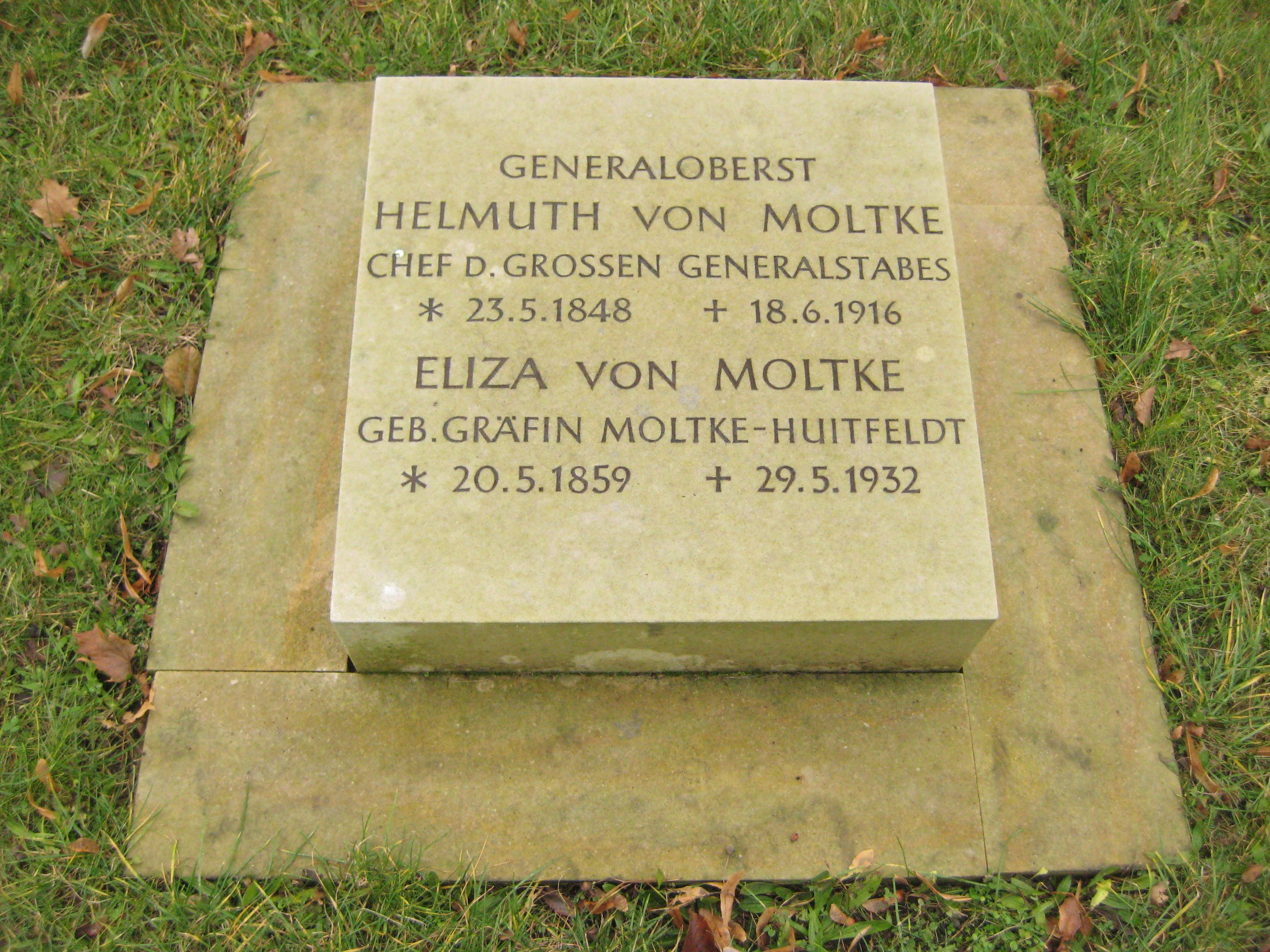
Restitution grave stone of Helmuth von Moltke

After German reunification in 1990 the cemetery came under the monument protection scheme and restoration work began. There is now a memorial to Berliners killed trying to cross the Berlin Wall in the cemetery. The cemetery also contains an unmarked mass grave of Berliners killed in allied Air Raids.

In December 2019 the unmarked grave of Reinhard Heydrich in the cemetery was opened, with police launching an investigation after a cemetery employee made the discovery. Stating that no remains had been removed, the police believe that whoever violated Heydrich's grave is thought to have had inside knowledge of its location.

== Notable individuals ==
In chronological order (a fuller alpha-list is at Category:Burials at the Invalids' Cemetery):

- 1757 – Hans Karl von Winterfeldt
- 1813 – Gerhard Johann David von Scharnhorst
- 1824 – Bogislav Friedrich Emanuel Graf Tauentzien von Wittenberg
- 1837 – Job von Witzleben
- 1841 – Gustav von Rauch
- 1843 (d. 1814) – Karl Friedrich Friesen
- 1848 – Karl Friedrich von dem Knesebeck
- 1848 – Hermann von Boyen
- 1850 – Friedrich Wilhelm von Rauch
- 1856 – August Hiller von Gaertringen
- 1878 – Therese Elssler (later Therese von Barnim)
- 1881 – Karl Julius von Groß (later von Groß von Schwarzhoff)
- 1892 – Fedor von Rauch
- 1899 – Friedrich Wilhelm von Rauch
- 1890 – Gustav Waldemar von Rauch
- 1900 – Alfred Bonaventura von Rauch
- 1901 – Albert von Rauch
- 1909 – Friedrich von Holstein
- 1910 – Julius von Verdy du Vernois
- 1913 – Alfred von Schlieffen
- 1914 – Karl von Schönberg
- 1916 – Helmuth Johannes Ludwig von Moltke
- 1917 – Moritz von Bissing
- 1917 – Maximilian von Prittwitz und Gaffron
- 1918 – Hans-Joachim Buddecke
- 1918 – Hermann von Eichhorn
- 1918 – Olivier Freiherr von Beaulieu-Marconnay
- 1919 – Robert von Klüber
- 1920 – Rudolf Berthold
- 1921 – Hans Hartwig von Beseler
- 1921 – Karl von Bülow
- 1923 – Ernst Troeltsch
- 1925–1975 (d. 1918) – Manfred Albrecht Freiherr von Richthofen
- 1926 – Wolf Wilhelm Friedrich von Baudissin
- 1926 – Josias von Heeringen
- 1927 – Max Hoffmann
- 1928 – Ulrich Neckel
- 1933 – Hans Maikowski
- 1933 – Werner von Frankenberg und Proschlitz
- 1933 – Ludwig von Schröder
- 1935 – Friedrich von Rauch
- 1936 – Ludwig von Falkenhausen
- 1936 – Hans von Seeckt
- 1937 – Adolf Karl von Oven
- 1938 – Rochus Schmidt
- 1939 – Oskar von Watter
- 1939 – Werner von Fritsch
- 1940 – Wolff von Stutterheim
- 1941 – Lothar von Arnauld de la Perière
- 1941 – Friedrich-Carl Cranz
- 1941 – Ernst Udet
- 1941 – Werner Mölders
- 1942 – Walter von Reichenau
- 1942 – Herbert Geitner
- 1942 – Fritz Todt
- 1942 – Hermann von der Lieth-Thomsen
- 1942 – Carl August von Gablenz
- 1942 – Reinhard Heydrich
- 1943 – Curt Haase
- 1944 – Hans-Valentin Hube
- 1944 – Rudolf Schmundt
- 1945 – Walter Marienfeld
