= Frederick of Hohenau =

Prussian nobleman (1857-1914)

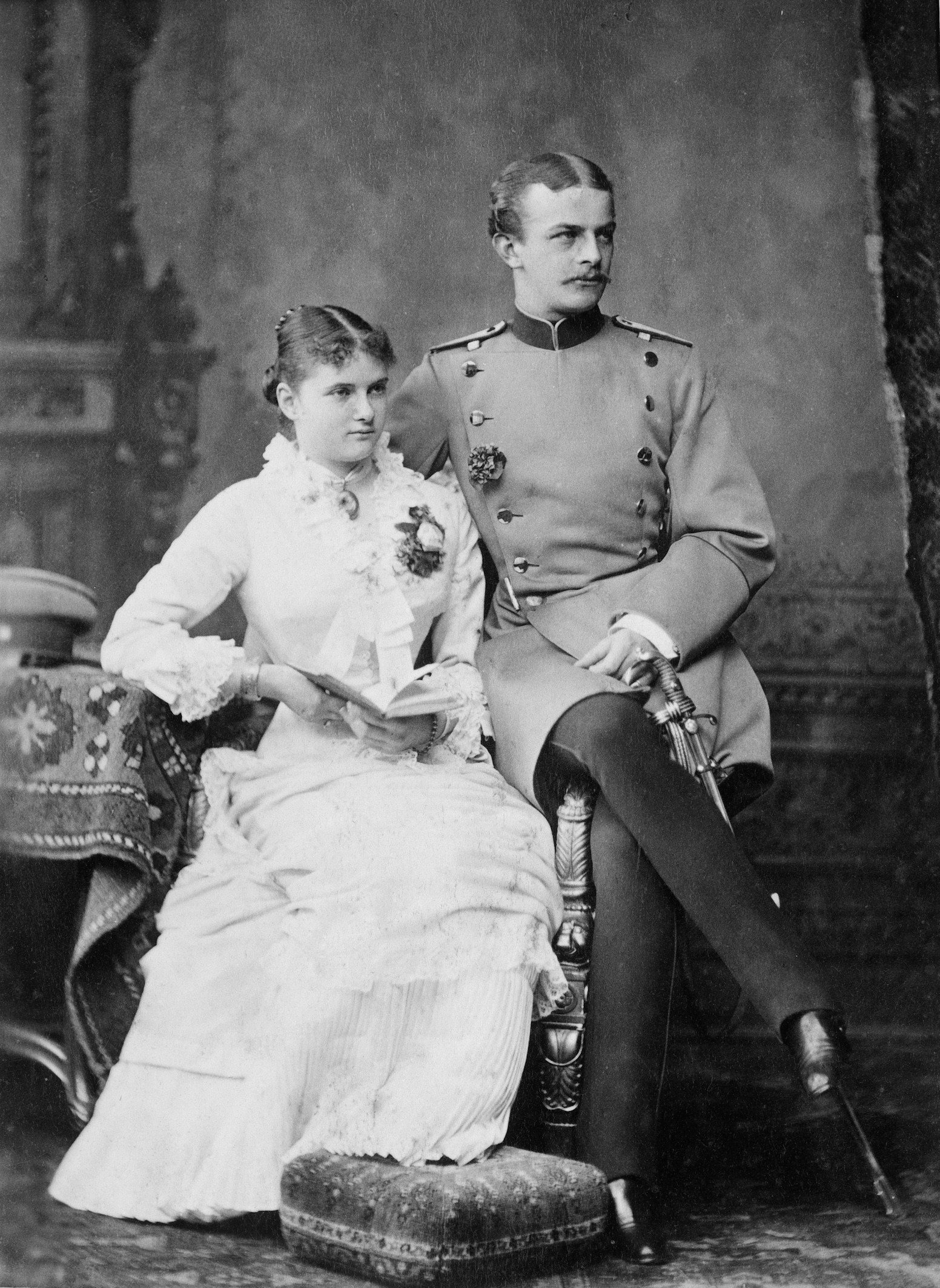
Frederick of Hohenau and his fiancée Charlotte von der Decken in 1880

Count Albrecht Friedrich Wilhelm Bernhard of Hohenau (21 May 1857, in the Albrechtsberg Castle, in Dresden – 15 April 1914, in Ochelhermsdorf) was a German nobleman.

Frederick, also known as Fritz, was a son of Prince Albrecht of Prussia (1809–1872), who was a brother of Emperor William I and King Frederick William IV of Prussia, from his second, morganatic marriage with Rosalie (1820–1879), daughter of the Prussian War Minister Gustav von Rauch. Because his father’s marriage to his mother was morganatic, Frederick was not counted as a member of the House of Hohenzollern.

After the death of his mother, Frederick was, together with his older brother, William, heir to the Schloss Albrechtsberg in Dresden, which he occupied until his death. In 1901, together with Friedrich Botho, a brother of Philipp, Prince of Eulenburg, he had to leave the Prussian military service because of his homosexual inclinations.

Frederick was also involved in the two biggest scandals of the German Empire under Kaiser Wilhelm II. He belonged to the Liebenberg Round Table and played a role alongside his wife in the so-called Kotze Affair.

== Family ==
Frederick married Charlotte von der Decken (1863–1933) at 21 June 1881 in Berbisdorf. The couple had the following issue:

- Albrecht Graf von Hohenau (1882–1966)
- Wilhelm Graf von Hohenau (1884–1957); a horse rider who competed in the 1912 Summer Olympics.
- Friedrich Karl Graf von Hohenau (1895–1929)
- Friedrich Franz Graf von Hohenau (1896–1918); killed in action during the First World War.

== Ancestry ==
Ancestors of Frederick of Hohenau

16. Prince Augustus William of Prussia
8. Frederick William II of Prussia
17. Duchess Luise of Brunswick-Wolfenbüttel
4. Frederick William III of Prussia
18. Louis IX, Landgrave of Hesse-Darmstadt
9. Landgravine Frederika Louisa of Hesse-Darmstadt
19. Countess Palatine Caroline of Zweibrücken
2. Prince Albert of Prussia
20. Duke Charles Louis Frederick of Mecklenburg
10. Charles II, Grand Duke of Mecklenburg-Strelitz
21. Princess Elisabeth Albertine of Saxe-Hildburghausen
5. Duchess Louise of Mecklenburg-Strelitz
22. Prince George William of Hesse-Darmstadt
11. Princess Friederike of Hesse-Darmstadt
23. Countess Maria Louise Albertine of Leiningen-Falkenburg-Dagsburg
1. Count Frederick of Hohenau
24. Johann Anton von Rauch
12. Bonaventura von Rauch
6. Gustav von Rauch
13. Johanna Justine Eleonore Bandel
3. Rosalie von Rauch
28. Georg Ernst von Holtzendorff
14. Georg Friedrich von Holtzendorff
29. Louise Dorothea Roeber
7. Rosalie von Holtzendorff
15. Rudolphine Wilhelmine von Lütke
