= Adolf von Rauch =

Adolf von Rauch may refer to:

- Adolf von Rauch (born 1798), German paper manufacturer
- Adolf von Rauch (born 1805), German cavalry officer
