= Rosalie von Rauch =

German countess (1820–1879)

- Countess of Hohenau
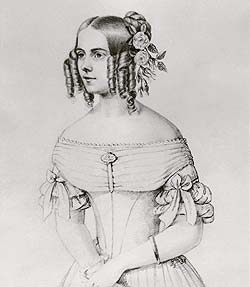
- Rosalie, Countess of Hohenau, born von Rauch.
- Full name: Rosalie Wilhelmina Johanna
- Born: 29 August 1820; Berlin
- Died: 5 March 1879 (aged 58); Albrechtsberg Palace, Dresden
- Spouse: Prince Albert of Prussia (m. 1853; died 1872)
- Issue: Wilhelm, Count of Hohenau; Frederick, Count of Hohenau
- Father: Gustav von Rauch
- Mother: Rosalie von Holtzendorff

Rosalie von Rauch (Rosalie Wilhelmine Johanna; 29 August 1820 – 5 March 1879), was a German noblewoman and, since 1853, Countess of Hohenau.

== Biography ==
Born in Berlin, she was the only daughter of Prussian General and Minister of War Gustav von Rauch by his second wife, Rosalie von Holtzendorff (1790–1862). She had one half-brother Adolf from her father's previous marriage to Caroline von Geusau (1780–1867) and three full brothers Gustav, Fedor and Albert von Rauch.

Rosalie was a maid of honor of Princess Marianne of the Netherlands, wife of Prince Albert, youngest son of King Frederick William III of Prussia. In Berlin on 13 June 1853, she became the second wife of the Prussian prince, who had divorced his wife in 1849. Almost two weeks before the wedding, on 28 May, Rosalie was named Countess of Hohenau (German: Gräfin von Hohenau). Due to her lower social status, according to the laws of the House of Hohenzollern the marriage was morganatic, and the couple was forced to avoid the Prussian court. Albert was in conflict with his brother King Frederick William IV, who opposed his divorce from Princess Marianne.

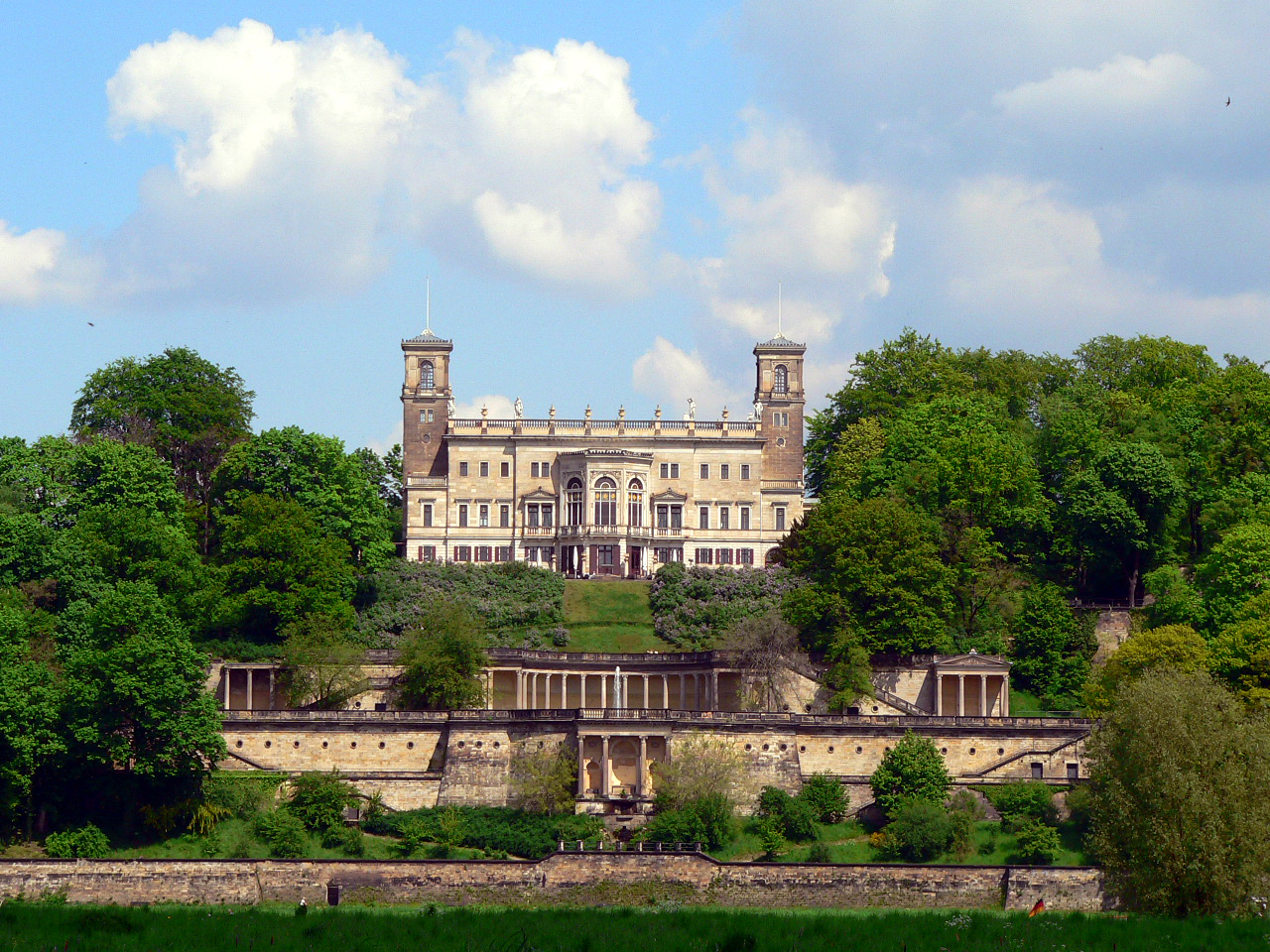
Albrechtsberg Palace, Dresden.

The couple resided for some time in Meiningen, at the side of Albert's oldest daughter, Hereditary Princess Charlotte, and later moved to a vineyard in Loschwitz near Dresden, Saxony, where Albert had a residence, Albrechtsberg Castle, erected in 1854. The Prussian ambassador in Dresden, Count Heinrich von Redern (1804–1888), repeatedly ignored Rosalie at the court in Dresden, which is why she and her husband never appeared there.

After Albert's second eldest brother William I became King of Prussia in 1861, the family circumstances were relaxed. William I visited Albrechtsberg Castle and Rosalie was formally introduced as his brother's wife. After her husband's death Rosalie lived in retirement at Albrechtsberg Castle, where she died, aged 58.

== Issue ==
- Georg Albrecht Wilhelm, Count of Hohenau (b. Albrechtsberg Castle, 25 April 1854 – d. Bad Flinsburg, 28 October 1930), married firstly in Lorzendorf on 10 July 1878 to Countess Laura Saurma von und zu der Jeltsch (b. Lorzendorf, 6 October 1857 - d. Potsdam, 24 February 1884) and secondly in Slawentzitz on 25 October 1887 to Princess Margarethe of Hohenlohe-Öhringen (b. Slawentzitz, 27 December 1865 – d. Dresden, 13 June 1940), daughter of Prince Hugo of Hohenlohe-Öhringen, Duke of Ujest (son of August, Prince of Hohenlohe-Öhringen), and Princess Pauline zu Fürstenberg, whose maternal uncle was Leopold, Grand Duke of Baden.
- Bernhard Wilhelm Albrecht Frederick, Count of Hohenau (b. Albrechtsberg Castle, 21 May 1857 – d. Ochelhermsdorf, 15 April 1914), married in Berbisdorf on 21 June 1881 to Charlotte von der Decken (b. Melkdorf, 23 April 1863 – d. Berlin, 30 January 1933).

Over ten years after Rosalie's death, her daughter-in-law Charlotte was involved in the "Kotze scandal", which lasted from the autumn of 1892 until the summer of 1894. Her son Fritz's wife was rumoured to be having an affair with Fritz's cousin Emperor Wilhelm II.
