= Albert von Rauch =

Prussian aristocrat and military general

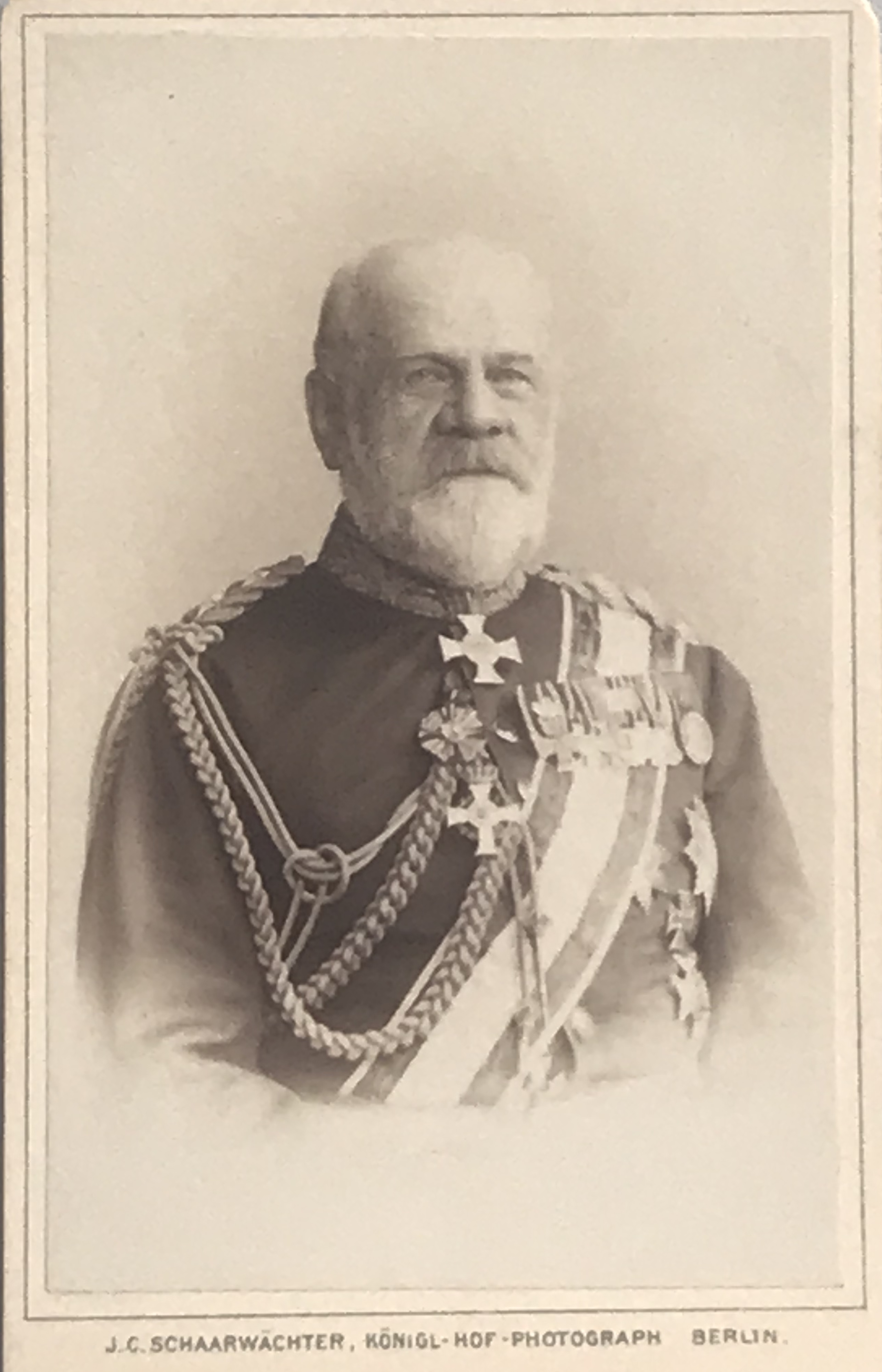
- General of the Infantry Albert von Rauch, by court photographer Julius Cornelius Schaarwaechter, 1897
- Born: 21 August 1829; Berlin, Kingdom of Prussia
- Died: 28 January 1901 (aged 71); German Empire
- Military career
- Service years: 1847-1897
- Rank: General der Infantrie
- Commands: Lehr Infantry Battalion; 19th Division; Royal Prussian State Gendarmerie
- Conflicts: Austro-Prussian War; Franco-Prussian War
- Awards: Order of the Red Eagle (Grand Cross)

Born into an aristocratic Prussian family, Albert Gustav Guido von Rauch (21 August 1829 – 28 January 1901) was a general of the infantry in the Prussian Army who fought in the Austro-Prussian War and Franco-Prussian War.

== Life ==
He was born in Berlin to General of the Infantry Gustav von Rauch, former Prussian Minister of War, and his second wife Rosalie, née von Holtzendorff (1790-1862). His grandfather was Major General Bonaventura von Rauch. His brothers were General of the Cavalry Gustav Waldemar von Rauch and the Prussian chief equerry Fedor von Rauch. His half-brother was the Hofmarschall and chamberlain Adolf von Rauch and his sister Rosalie Countess von Hohenau, morganatic wife of Prince Albrecht of Prussia, the youngest brother of King Frederick William IV of Prussia and William I, German Emperor. From his youth he had a friendship with Prince Friedrich Karl of Prussia.

In 1847, Rauch, following the tradition of his family and his older brother, entered the Prussian Army, becoming a Second-Lieutenant in the 1st Foot Guards. In 1855 he was named adjutant of the non-commissioned officers' school in Potsdam. By personal request of Prince Friedrich Karl, Rauch became the adjutant of 1st Guards Infantry Division in August 1857. In 1859, Rauch was promoted to Hauptmann. In 1860, Rauch became a company commander back in the 1st Foot Guards. He did not participate in the Second Schleswig War, instead serving as acting commander of the NCO school in Jülich. During the Austro-Prussian War, Rauch was in command of the headquarters of the Second Army.

After the war, Rauch was promoted to Major. During the Franco-Prussian War he was commander of the 1st Guards Landwehr Regiment's third battalion, leading it in the sieges of Strasbourg and Paris. In this capacity he was promoted to lieutenant colonel in mid-August 1871. At the end of the September 1870, Rauch was awarded the Iron Cross (first class). After the war Rauch became commander of the Lehr Infantry Battalion and from 1873 onwards led the 109th (1st Baden) Life Grenadier Regiment. He later was promoted to Generalmajor and became the commander of 41st Infantry Brigade in Mainz. On 6 August 1884 Rauch became commander of the 19th Division. On September 4 he was promoted to Generalleutnant. On 5 May 1888, Rauch was awarded the Order of the Crown (first class). On 2 August 1888 Rauch succeeded his older brother, Gustav Waldemar von Rauch, as Chief of the Royal Prussian State Gendarmerie (national military police force). He was given the character of a General der Infantrie in the next year. In 1897, the year of his 50th service anniversary, Rauch received the substantial promotion to that rank and was awarded the Grand Cross of the Order of the Red Eagle with Oak Leaves, Swords and Crown with his retirement. Ludwig von Hammerstein-Loxten succeeded him after his retirement.

== Family ==
In 1866 Albert married Elisabeth von Bismarck. Their sons Friedrich Wilhelm von Rauch, First Lieutenant à la suite of the 1st Foot Guard Regiment and Military Governor of Emperor William II's sons, and Leopold von Rauch, Colonel in the German General Staff, took up military careers as well.
