= Berlin Old Ostbahnhof =

Former railway station in Berlin, Germany

Coordinates: 52°30′42″N 13°26′25″E

Berlin Ostbahnhof (Küstriner Bahnhof)
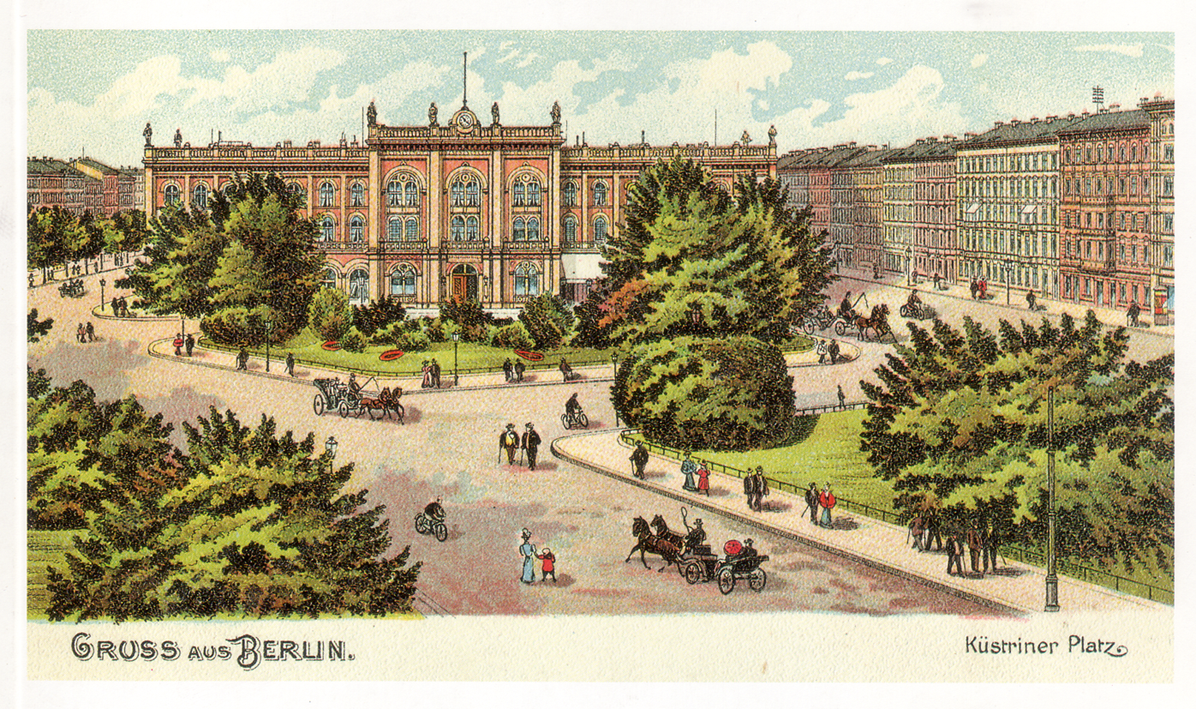
- Station building at Küstriner Platz, postcard (c. 1900)

General information
- Location: Küstriner Platz; Friedrichshain, Berlin; Germany

Construction
- Architect: Adolf Lohse

History
- Opened: 1 October 1867
- Closed: 1882
Location
- Location within Berlin Location within Germany Location within Europe

The old Berlin Ostbahnhof, more commonly referred to as Küstriner Bahnhof, was a short-lived passenger railway terminus in Berlin, Germany, opened on 1 October 1867 as the terminus of the Prussian Eastern Railway (Ostbahn) to Küstrin (now Kostrzyn) and Königsberg (Kaliningrad).

== History ==
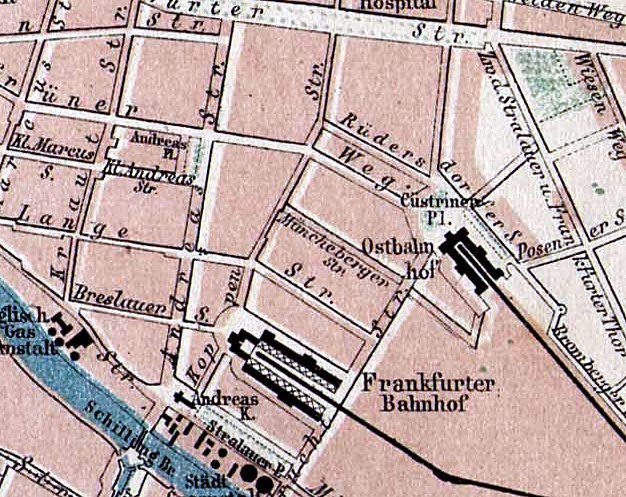
Locator map of the Old Ostbahnhof and Frankfurter Bahnhof

The station building was the first constructed by the Prussian state instead of a private company, and intended as the terminus of the Prussian Ostbahn (Eastern Railway) to Danzig and Königsberg, and on to Russia. It was located on Küstriner Platz (since 1972: Franz-Mehring-Platz) in the present-day Friedrichshain quarter, slightly north of Frankfurter Bahnhof (the current Ostbahnhof). The station concourse was projected by the Prussian building official Adolf Lohse (1807–1867) and upon his death completed by railway architect Hermann Cuno (1831–1896). As a passenger station it was used until 1882, when the Stadtbahn line was opened, the Silesian Railway company had been nationalized, and the Ostbahn traffic moved to neighbouring Frankfurter Bahnhof, which had been rebuilt as the Schlesischer Bahnhof through station. The rear freight yard later became part of the Wriezener Bahnhof complex opened in 1903.

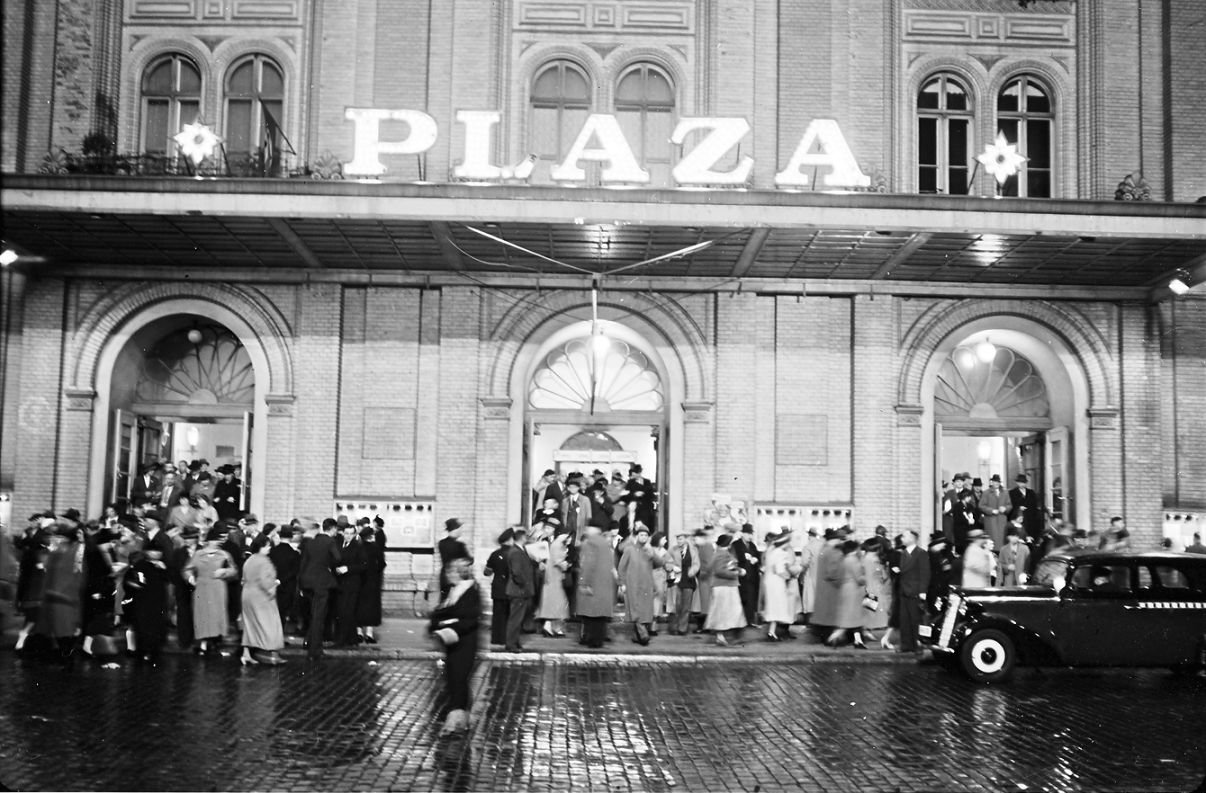
Plaza music hall, 1938

Some years after the closure the Old Ostbahnhof was used as a balloon factory, and later as a shelter of the Red Cross. On 1 February 1929 the building was converted to a music hall, named Varieté Plaza, then one of the largest in Berlin providing seating for up to 3,000 spectators. "Aryanized" after the Nazi seizure of power in 1933, it was used from 1938 by the state leisure organization Kraft durch Freude. The station building was finally damaged in the Bombing of Berlin in World War II and destroyed during the final Battle of Berlin; the premises were cleared by 1952. Several years later, from 1969 to 1974, the large office building of the East German Socialist Unity Party (SED) newspaper Neues Deutschland was erected on the ground of the former railway terminus. A former cogeneration plant in the rear, built in 1953/54, today is home of the Berghain nightclub.
