= Yannick Anzuluni =

Congolese Canadian basketball player (born 1988)

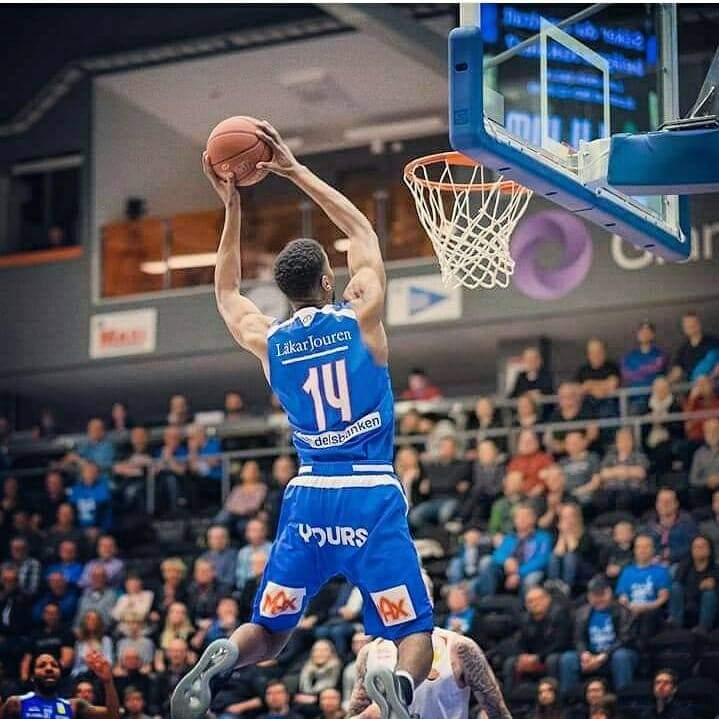

Personal information
- Born: August 21, 1987 (age 39) Kinshasa, Zaire
- Listed height: 6 ft 9 in (2.06 m)
- Listed weight: 205 lb (93 kg)

Career information
- High school: Garneau (Ottawa)
- College: Houghton (2006–2010)
- NBA draft: 2010: undrafted
- Playing career: 2010–2021
- Position: Small forward

Career history
- 2010–2012: Quebec Kebs
- 2012–2013: Magdeburg
- 2013–2014: Pyrintö
- 2014–2015: Rostock Seawolves
- 2015–2016: Umeå BBK
- 2016–2018: Luleå
- 2018–2019: Rostock Seawolves
- 2020–2021: Bærum Basket

Career highlights
- Swedish champion (2017); NBL Canada All-Star (2012); Finnish First Division Player of the Year (2014); Finnish First Division All-Star (2014); Finnish First Division scoring champion (2014); Finnish First Division steals leader (2014); Eurobasket.com Regionalliga North Defensive Player of the Year (2013); Eurobasket.com All-Regionalliga North Team (2013); Eurobasket.com 2. Bundesliga ProB Best Forward (2015); Swedish Basketligan champion (2017); Eurobasket.com Swedish Basketligan Finals MVP (2017); Eurobasket.com All-Swedish Basketligan First Team (2017); Eurobasket.com All-Swedish Basketligan First Team (2018); BLNO All-Star Team (2021); BLNO All-Star (2021)

Yannick Anzuluni (born August 21, 1987) is a Canadian-Congolese former professional basketball player. He played college basketball for Houghton College. Anzuluni then played professionally in Canada, Germany, Finland, Sweden, Norway, and Spain.

== Early life and college career ==
Anzuluni was born in Kinshasa, Zaire. His family later moved to Belgium, where he lived for approximately ten years before moving to Canada and played basketball in high school.

From 2006 to 2010, Anzuluni played college basketball at Houghton College in New York. In 79 games, he averaged 15.4 points, 9.3 rebounds, 2.1 assists, 1.8 steals and 1.4 blocks per game.

== Professional career ==
=== Canada ===
Anzuluni began his professional career in Canada with the Quebec Kebs of the NBL Canada. He was selected as an NBL Canada All-Star in 2012, although he did not appear in the All-Star Game.

=== Germany and Finland ===
In the 2012–13 season, Anzuluni played for BBC Magdeburg in Germany's 1. Regionalliga North. He averaged 17.5 points and 11 rebounds per game in 21 league appearances. At the end of the season, he was named to the Eurobasket.com All-Regionalliga North Team and was selected as the league's Defensive Player of the Year.

Anzuluni moved to Finland for the 2013–14 season, playing for Tampereen Pyrintö's second team in the country's second division. He was named Finnish First Division Player of the Year and was also selected as an All-Star. He led the league in scoring and steals.

In 2014, Anzuluni returned to Germany and joined the Rostock Seawolves of the 2. Bundesliga ProB. During the 2014–15 regular season, he averaged 20.5 points and 8.3 rebounds per game and led the ProB North division in steals with 3.3 per game. He also recorded the only triple-double by a player in the ProB North during the regular season."Zahlen, bitte!". Rostock Seawolves. April 2015.

Rostock won the ProB North regular-season championship and reached the ProB semifinals. Anzuluni averaged 22.6 points and 7.5 rebounds per game during the playoffs. Following the season, Eurobasket.com named him the best forward in the 2. Bundesliga ProB."SEAWOLVES verabschieden Yannick Anzuluni". Rostock Seawolves. June 19, 2015.

=== Sweden ===
Anzuluni joined Umeå BSKT for the 2015–16 season in the Swedish Basketligan.

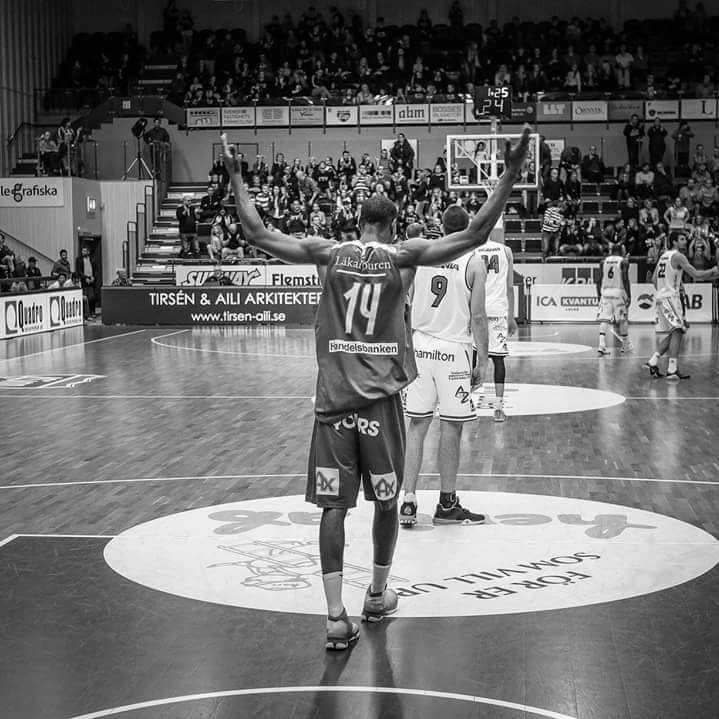
Swedish champion

In 2016, he briefly joined German Bundesliga club Phoenix Hagen. He appeared in two Bundesliga games before leaving the club.

Anzuluni subsequently joined BC Luleå, where he played from 2016 to 2018. During this period he won the Basketligan championship with Luleå in the 2016–17 season. Luleå defeated Södertälje Kings 4–1 in the Swedish Finals.

In August 2018, Anzuluni returned to the Rostock Seawolves, who had been promoted to Germany's ProA. During the 2018–19 season, he averaged approximately 14 points and 5.8 rebounds per game and helped Rostock reach the ProA playoffs.

=== Return to Sweden and Norway ===
In 2020, he signed with Bærum Basket in Norway's BLNO. During the 2020–21 season, he was selected to the BLNO All-Star Team. The selection was made by the league's coaches."Gilligan MVP: Håper på sluttspill". Norwegian Basketball Federation. 2021.

Anzuluni produced several notable performances during the season. He scored 26 points against Fyllingen in the opening game of the season and later recorded 31 points, 8 rebounds and 5 assists against Tromsø Storm."Bærum stakk fra Fyllingen". Norwegian Basketball Federation. October 4, 2020."Fire spillere bak 117 poeng". Norwegian Basketball Federation. November 2, 2020.

=== Spain ===
Following his retirement from professional basketball, Anzuluni briefly returned to play, joining C.A. Montemar in Alicante, Spain.

During the 2024–25 season, he played for Montemar in Tercera FEB season. Spanish basketball publication Zona de Básquet highlighted him among the notable veterans in the competition and reported that he was averaging 20.73 points per game and 24.27 in valuation."Números bestiales en Tercera FEB". Zona de Básquet. February 24, 2026.

== International career ==
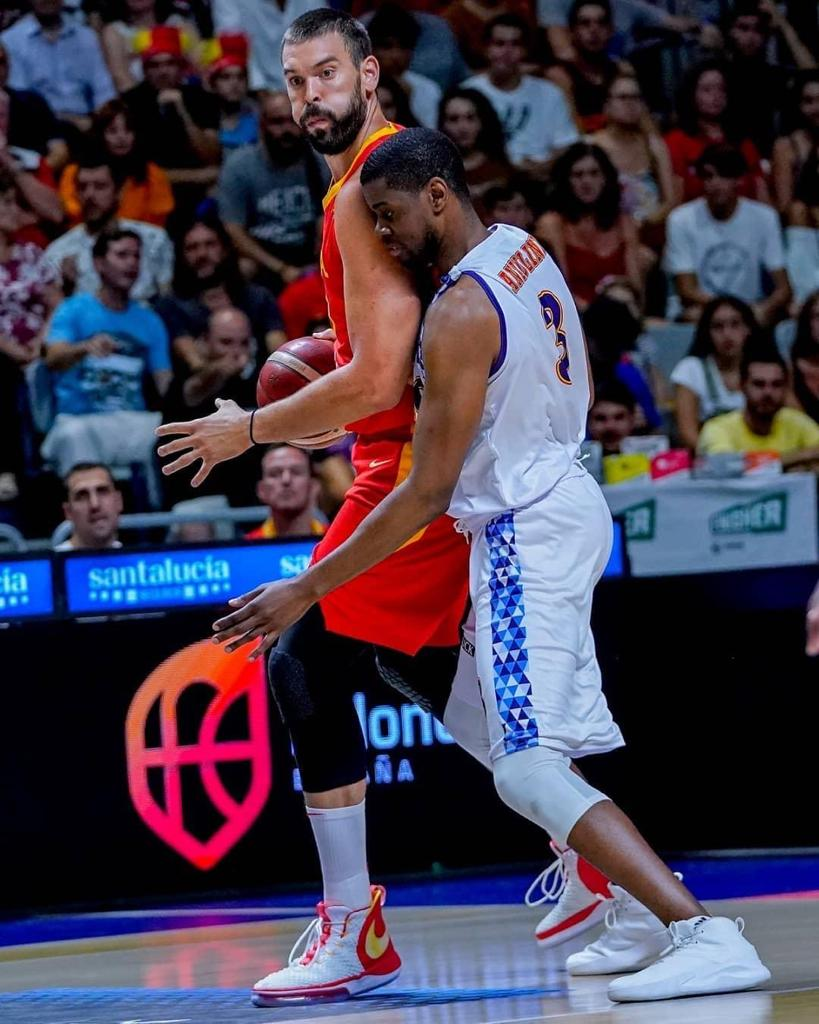
Spain vs. RDC 2019

Anzuluni has represented the Democratic Republic of the Congo national basketball team. In 2019, he represented the Democratic Republic of the Congo in a notable international game against world champions Spain in Málaga, Spain, where he recorded 12 points, 5 rebounds, and 5 assists.

== Awards and honors ==
Year	Award / honor
2012	NBL Canada All-Star
2013	Eurobasket.com All-Regionalliga North Team
2013	Eurobasket.com Regionalliga North Defensive Player of the Year
2014	Finnish First Division Player of the Year
2014	Finnish First Division All-Star
2014	Finnish First Division scoring champion
2014	Finnish First Division steals leader
2015	Eurobasket.com 2. Bundesliga ProB Best Forward
2017	Swedish champion
2017	Eurobasket.com Swedish Basketligan Finals MVP
2017	Eurobasket.com All-Swedish Basketligan First Team
2018	Eurobasket.com All-Swedish Basketligan First Team
2021	BLNO All-Star
