= Equestrian at the 1912 Summer Olympics – Team jumping =

Team jumping at the Games of the V Olympiad
- Date: 17 July
- Competitors: 22 from 6 nations

Medalists
1st place, gold medalist(s)		Sweden; Gustaf Lewenhaupt, Gustaf Kilman, Fredrik Rosencrantz, Hans von Rosen
2nd place, silver medalist(s)		France; Pierre Dufour d'Astafort, Jacques Cariou, Ernest Meyer, Gaston Seigner
3rd place, bronze medalist(s)		Germany; Sigismund Freyer, Ernst Deloch, Prince Friedrich Karl of Prussia, Wilhelm Graf von Hohenau

The team jumping was an equestrian event held as part of the Equestrian at the 1912 Summer Olympics programme. It was the first appearance of the event. Unlike the team eventing competition, the team jumping was not simply a sum of scores from the individual jumping competition. Instead, riders competed in the team event separately a day after the individual event. Different riders could be used in the two events, and teams were limited to 4 riders while each nation could send 6 individuals.

== Results ==
3 minutes and 50 seconds were allotted. 190 points was the maximum score. The top three jumpers for each team counted their scores, which were summed to give a team score.

Place	Team	Time	Score	Total
Final
1	Sweden			545
1	Gustaf Lewenhaupt and Medusa	3:36	188	545
1	Gustaf Kilman and Gåtan	3:45	180	545
1	Hans von Rosen and Lord Iron	3:51	177	545
1	Fredrik Rosencrantz and Drabant	4:03	171	545
2	France			538
2	Pierre Dufour d'Astafort and Amazone	3:37	185	538
2	Jacques Cariou and Mignon	3:38	182	538
2	Ernest Meyer and Allons-y	3:51	171	538
2	Gaston Seigner and Cocotte	3:26	170	538
3	Germany			530
3	Sigismund Freyer and Ultimus	3:22	181	530
3	Wilhelm Graf von Hohenau and Pretty Girl	3:14	177	530
3	Ernst Deloch and Hubertus	3:42	172	530
3	Prince Friedrich Karl of Prussia and Gibson Boy	3:23	166	530
4	United States			527
4	John Montgomery and Deceive	3:31	180	527
4	Guy Henry and Chiswell	3:42	174	527
4	Benjamin Lear and Poppy	3:36	173	527
5	Russian Empire			520
5	Aleksandr Rodzyanko and Eros	3:31	176	520
5	Mikhail Pleshkov and Yvette	3:39.6	172	520
5	Aleksey Selikhov and Tugela	3:53	172	520
5	Dmitri Pavlovich and Unité	3:06.8	169	520
6	Belgium			510
6	Emmanuel de Blommaert and Clonmore	3:30	188	510
6	Gaston de Trannoy and Capricieux	3:44	162	510
6	Paul Convert and La Sioute	3:50.4	160	510

== Sources ==
- Bergvall, Erik (ed.) (1913). Adams-Ray, Edward (trans.). (ed.). The Official Report of the Olympic Games of Stockholm 1912. Stockholm: Wahlström & Widstrand.
- Wudarski, Pawel (1999). "Wyniki Igrzysk Olimpijskich" (in Polish). Archived from the original on 16 February 2009.
