= BBC Magdeburg =

Magdeburg
- Nickname: Otto Baskets
- Founded: 2002
- Dissolved: 2017
- Arena: Hermann-Gieseler-Halle
- Capacity: 2000
- Location: Magdeburg, Germany
- President: Christian Tolk
- Team manager: Toni Kohlmeyer
- Head coach: Dimitris Polychroniadis
Home	Away

The BBC Magdeburg (Basketball Club Magdeburg) was a German basketball team based in Magdeburg. It was established in 2002 and dissolved in 2017.

== History ==
At the Technical University of Magdeburg top-flight basketball was played in the 1980s. The greatest successes were in 1988 and 1989, the DDR Championship. After the German Reunification the team played as USC Magdeburg in the northern group of the 2. Basketball League in which one only achieved a victory of the season and immediately descended again. Known players of that time, as Erik Hebold and Achim Grossmann, now playing at the BBC Magdeburg with the Oldies.

The BBC Magdeburg was founded in 2002. Since then, the club played until 2013 with the first men's team in the 1.Regionalliga Nord (4th Basketball-League in Germany). In addition, the dedicated team of youth work and had the oldie-team the second team and other teams in the league use. During this time the club acted as BG Magdeburg.

The restructuring of the 2011/2012 season meant that they are primarily focused on the 1st men's team. The Oldie team also played for the 2012/2013 season continues in league play and with an A-Youth in cooperation with the USC (Sportclub of the University in Magdeburg) involved one employs the game mode. In cooperation with Subway were formed a "Subway Basketball Academy", which is to ensure the long term for the offspring receipt in Magdeburg.

With the second placement in the 2012/2013 season, the highest since 2003, does not ascend from the 4th League could be achieved from a sporting perspective. However, the club continued for a promotion to the ProB and ProA. This was due to the economically justified termination, the Düsseldorf Basketball Association Düsseldorf Baskets and a successful wildcard method.

Since the 2013/2014 season in the ProA is called the first men's team of BBC Magdeburg, as part of the propagated action since 2010 "Otto Magdeburg", "Otto Baskets". This is to the closeness of the association strengthened with the city and its visibility can be further increased. Sporty but the team could not convince 2013/2014 and climbed the last to the table in the ProB from. On June 24, 2014 were significant financial difficulty explored. On the same day a relicensingprocedure was initiated as a result of this process the previously issued license ProB was initially withdrawn. As part of the relicensingprocedure was found that was violated license conditions and has the economic situation compared to the original license application changed significantly. However, it has upheld the opposition of the BBC Magdeburg against the license revocation on July 30, so that the ProB license for the 2014/15 season reissued

== Players ==
=== Current roster ===
Note: Flags indicate national team eligibility at FIBA-sanctioned events. Players may hold other non-FIBA nationalities not displayed.

Otto Baskets roster
Players
Coaches

Pos.	No.	Nat.	Name	Ht.	Wt.	Age
PF	1	(Germany)	Orlando, Akis Fabian	1.95 m (6 ft 5 in)	91 kg (201 lb)	33 – 31 August 1991
SG	4	(Germany)	Wendt, Robert	1.84 m (6 ft 0 in)	81 kg (179 lb)	29 – 5 April 1995
SG	5	(Germany)	Ghebreigziabiher, Jonathan	1.74 m (5 ft 9 in)	68 kg (150 lb)	33 – 26 March 1991
PF	7	(United States)	Johnson, Eddie Dennorius (injured)	1.96 m (6 ft 5 in)	102 kg (225 lb)	33 – 27 May 1991
SF	9	(Germany)	Kecker, David	1.92 m (6 ft 4 in)	83 kg (183 lb)	30 – 8 February 1995
C	11	(Germany)	Buck, Joseph	2.02 m (6 ft 8 in)	110 kg (243 lb)	43 – 26 April 1981
PF	13	(Germany)	Monse, Steven	1.98 m (6 ft 6 in)	104 kg (229 lb)	35 – 26 January 1990
PF	15	(Germany)	Rauch, Sebastian	1.98 m (6 ft 6 in)	98 kg (216 lb)	37 – 16 September 1987
PG	22	(Germany)	Frazier, Chris	1.83 m (6 ft 0 in)	79 kg (174 lb)	34 – 20 July 1990
SF	23	(Germany)	Mondo, Joel	1.86 m (6 ft 1 in)	90 kg (198 lb)	36 – 9 August 1988
SG	33	(Germany)	Thomas, Christopher Tobias	1.93 m (6 ft 4 in)	87 kg (192 lb)	30 – 9 December 1994
C	43	(United States)	Gillette, Andre William	2.06 m (6 ft 9 in)	112 kg (247 lb)	34 – 19 June 1990
SF	50	(Germany)	Stachula, Philipp (C)	1.85 m (6 ft 1 in)	87 kg (192 lb)	37 – 14 October 1987
PF	77	(Germany)	Vervuert, Matthias	1.94 m (6 ft 4 in)	102 kg (225 lb)	37 – 22 April 1987

Head coach

- (Greece) Dimitris Polychroniadis

Assistant coach(es)

- (Poland) Kamil Piechuki

Team manager

- (Germany) Jan Tiedge

Legend

- (C) Team captain
- Injured

- Roster
Updated: November 23, 2014

2014/15 imports

- Chris Frazier (University of Dubuque)
- Philipp Stachula (Paderborn Baskets)
- Joseph Buck (Crailsheim Merlins)
- Akis Fabian Orlando (DJK Südwest Köln)
- Steven Monse (BV Chemnitz 99)
- Jonathan Ghebreiziabiher (SG Braunschweig)
- David Kecker (SG Braunschweig)
- Eddie Dennorius Johnson (College of Charleston)
- Christopher Tobias Thomas (Paderborn Baskets)
- Andre William Gillette (Fairleigh Dickinson University)
- Joel Mondo (Hertener Löwen by 11/2014)
- Sebastian Rauch (BC Erfurt)

2014/15 exports

- Jaremie Woods (Cuxhaven BasCats)
- Lars Mayer (Hertener Löwen)
- Edward Seward (Cuxhaven BasCats)
- Nico Drägert (Erdgas Ehingen/Urspringschule)
- Drew James Maynard (Vaerlose BBK)
- Morinia Lamar
- Richard Fröhlich (VfL Stade)
- Joel Mondo (Hertener Löwen to 10/2014)
- Triantafillos Tzakopoulos (Promitheas)
- Larry Wright
- Leonard Washington
- Kevin Schweiger
- Martin Volf

== Season by Season ==
Season	Tier	League	Pos.	Victory:Defeat	Points	Postseason
2003–2004	4	Regionalliga	7/12	20:24	64 *	---
2004–2005	4	Regionalliga	9/13	20:28	68 *	---
2005–2006	4	Regionalliga	3/11	24:16	64 *	---
2006–2007	4	Regionalliga	8/13	24:24	72 *	---
2007–2008	4	Regionalliga	5/12	24:20	64 *	---
2008–2009	4	Regionalliga	6/12	22:22	66 *	---
2009–2010	4	Regionalliga	5/11	10:10	30 ²	---
2010–2011	4	Regionalliga	9/12	8:14	30 ²	---
2011–2012	4	Regionalliga	4/12	13:9	26 ³	---
2012–2013	4	Regionalliga	2/12	19:3	38 ³	---
2013–2014	2	ProA	16/16	8:22	14 ³ **	---

(* The German basketball association (DBB) distribute Points in this time for: Win=3 Points; Loss=1 Point)
(² From 2009 to 2011 The German basketball association (DBB) distribute Points for: Win=2 Points; Loss=1 Point)
(³ Since 2011 The German basketball association (DBB) distribute Points for: Win=2 Points; Loss=0 Point)
(** The Club miss payments on the ProA for the wildcard method, so lost 2 Points)
