= Friedrich Wilhelm von Rauch (born 1868) =

Officer in the Prussian Army

Friedrich Wilhelm Gustav Claus von Rauch (10 September 1868 in Potsdam – 11 August 1899 in Kassel) was an officer in the Prussian Army. He was the godson of Frederick III, German Emperor and the son of the General of the Infantry Albert von Rauch (1829–1901) and his wife Elisabeth, née von Bismarck (1845–1923). He became a military governor and tutor to Wilhelm II's sons.

== Life ==
=== Family ===
Born into an aristocratic Prussian family, Friedrich Wilhelm von Rauch was the son of the General of the Infantry Albert von Rauch (1829–1901) and his wife Elisabeth, née von Bismarck (1845–1923). His grandfather was the Prussian War Minister and honorary citizen of Berlin, General of the Infantry Gustav von Rauch, his great-grandfather Major General Bonaventura von Rauch.

Friedrich Wilhelm von Rauch was the godson of Emperor Friedrich III.

=== First Foot Guard Regiment and Military Governor of William II's sons ===
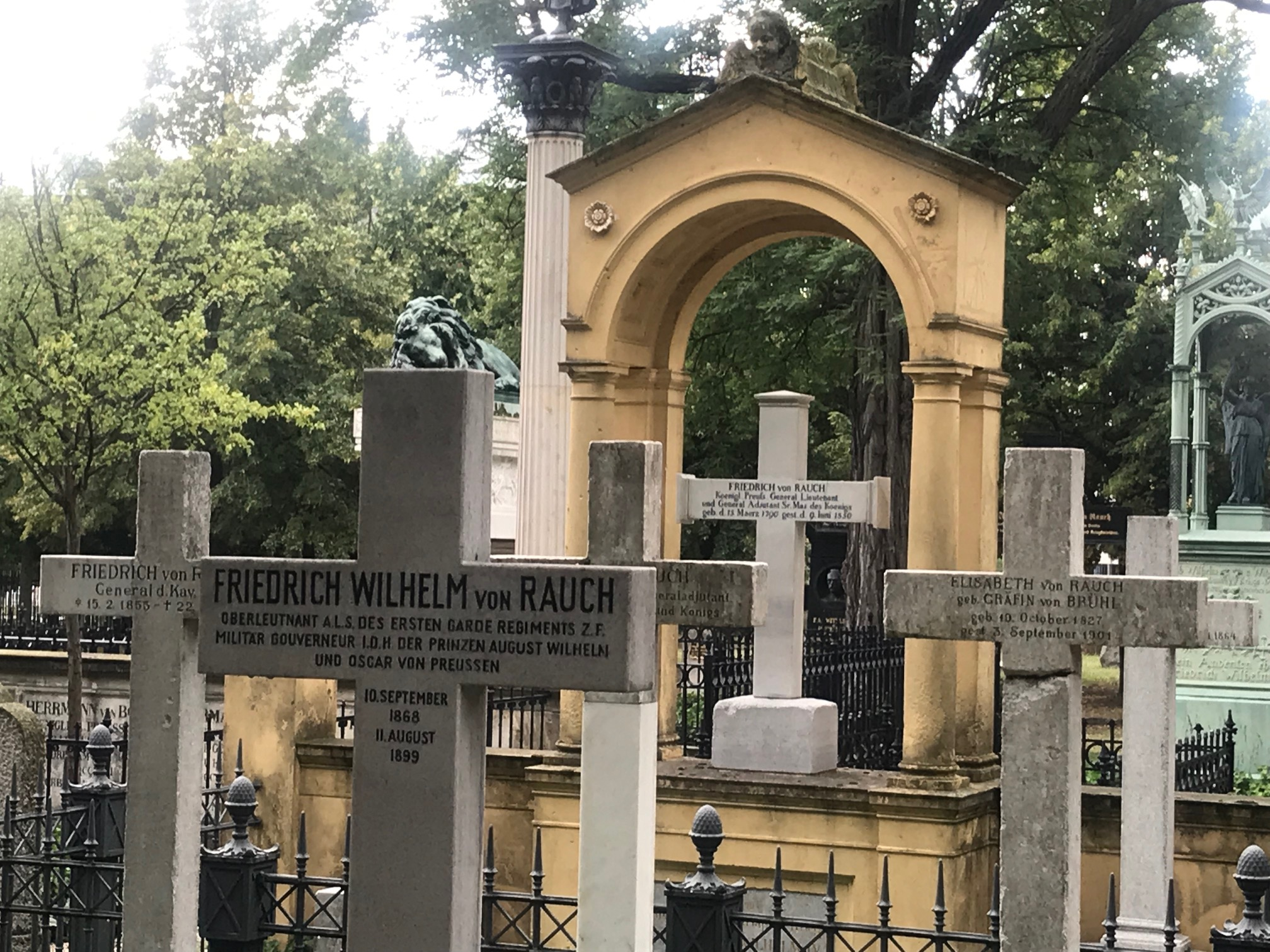
Grave cross for first lieutenant Friedrich Wilhelm von Rauch on Berlin's Invalids' Cemetery (foreground)

After graduating from the Lyceum II in Hanover, Rauch joined the 1st Foot Guard Regiment in Potsdam in 1887 - as did his father in 1847 and his younger brother, later Colonel Leopold von Rauch (1876–1955), in 1894. In 1888 he was promoted to ensign, in 1889 to Second Lieutenant. In 1892 Rauch became adjutant of the 1st Battalion.

In 1894 Emperor William II and Empress Augusta Victoria chose Rauch as the Second Military Governor and educator of Crown Prince William, as well as of his two younger brothers Prince Eitel Friedrich and Adalbert for their training in the Princes' House on Ploen Princes' Island in Schleswig-Holstein. In 1896 Rauch was promoted to First Lieutenant, leaving in his command and in the position à la suite of the 1st Foot Guard Regiment. In 1898 the imperial couple chose Rauch as the First Military Governor of their younger sons, Prince August Wilhelm and Prince Oskar.

In 1899 Rauch accompanied the Empress and her two youngest sons on their journey through the High Tauern and Berchtesgaden Alps. After returning from Austria, Rauch died in August 1899 in the Imperial Castle Wilhelmshöhe near Kassel of pneumonia.

His successor as First Military Governor was Lieutenant (Imperial Navy) Oskar Graf von Platen-Hallermund, Wing Adjutant of the Emperor, later Vice Admiral and longtime Court Marshal of Wilhelm II from 1911 to 1935.

=== Grave at Berlin Invalids' Cemetery ===
Rauch was buried in his family's grave at the Berlin Invalid's Cemetery and in the vicinity of his grandfather Gustav von Rauch's grave of honour. The preserved tomb of the Rauch family was designed by the royal court architect Friedrich August Stueler on behalf of the Prussian King Frederick William IV.

== Literature ==
- Gothaische Adeliges Taschenbuch (Gotha Almanac Peerage Paperback).Volumes B 1928 (older genealogy), p. 470
- Laurenz Demps: Zwischen Mars und Minerva. Wegweiser Invalidenfriedhof. 1998, p. 125 et seq.
- Chronik des Ersten Garde-Regiments zu Fuss. Berlin 1902.
- Claus Heinrich Bill: Prinz Eitel Friedrich von Preußen. 1995.
- Neue Kreuzzeitung of August 12, 1899 and August 15, 1899.
