= Berlin Wriezener Bahnhof =

Railway station in Berlin, Germany

Coordinates: 52°30′37″N 13°26′24″E

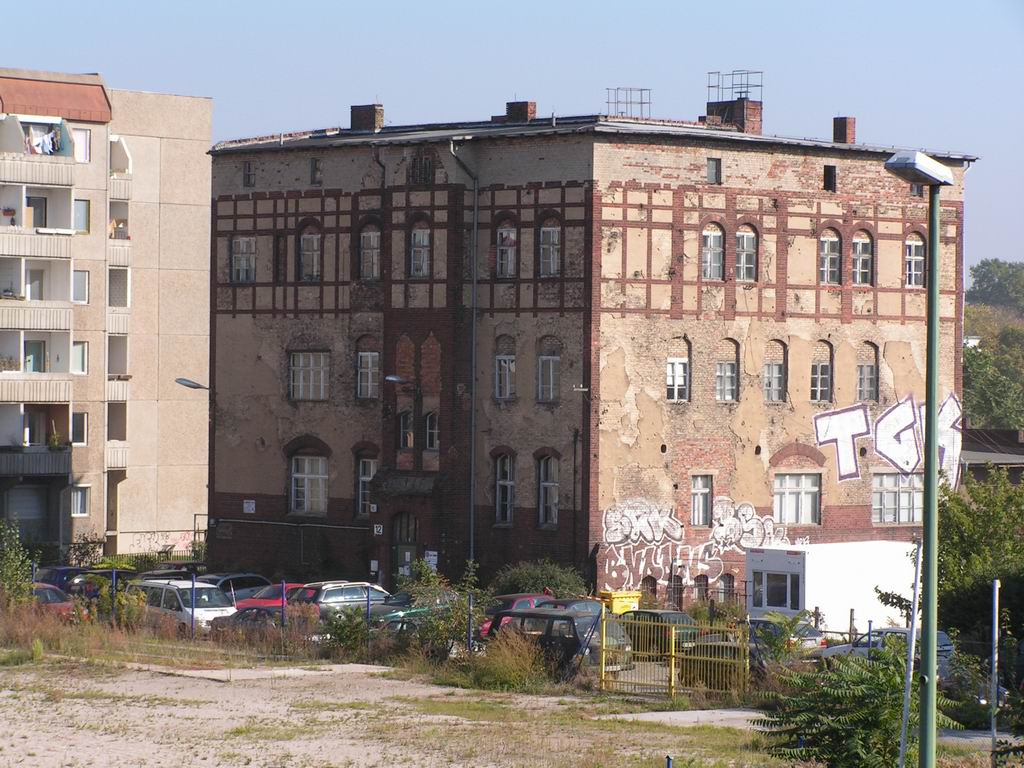
- The former station building

General information
- Location: Friedrichshain-Kreuzberg, Berlin, Berlin; Germany
Location

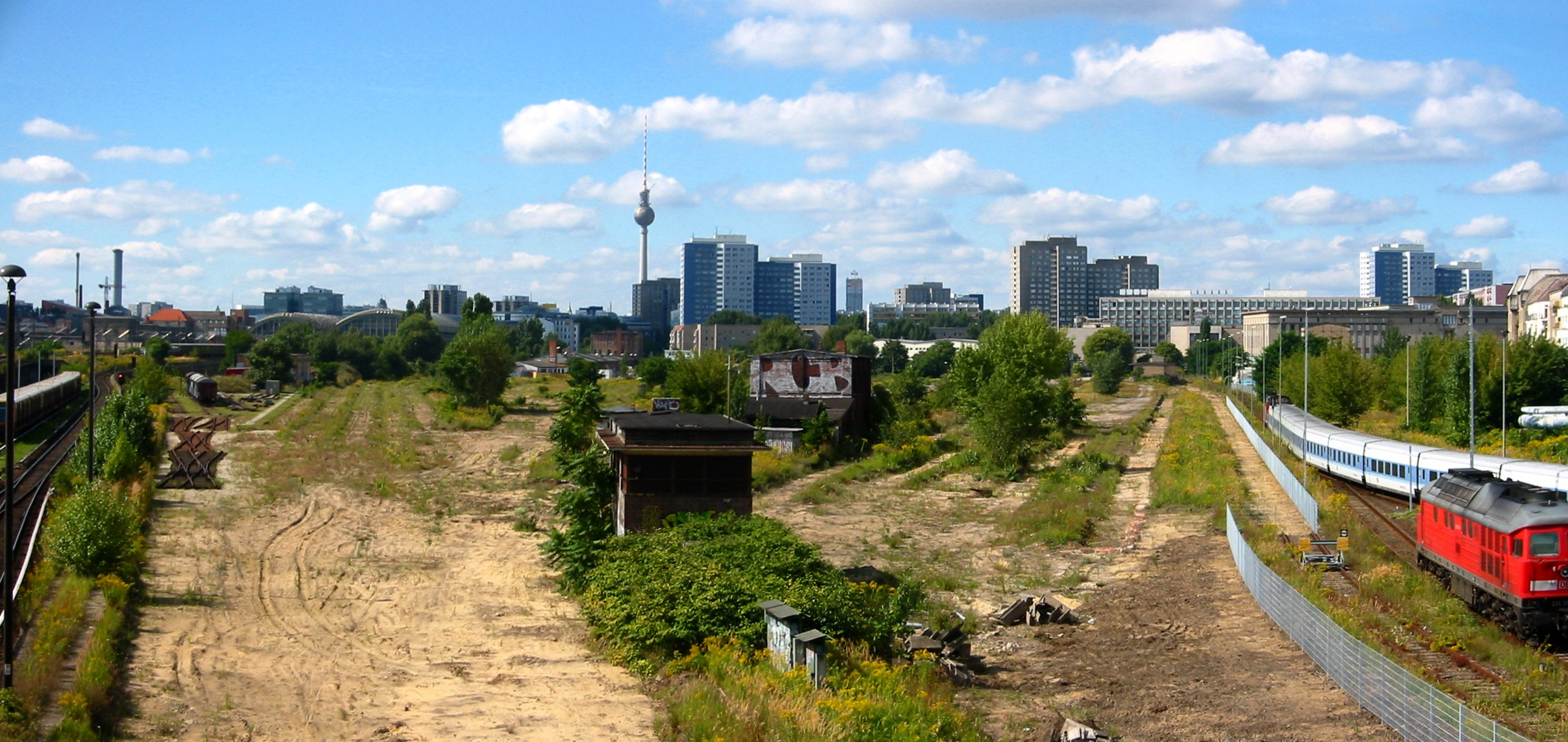
Area of the Wriezener Güterbahnhof in summer 2005 after the removal of the tracks

Berlin Wriezener Bahnhof was a passenger railway terminus in Berlin, Germany. The station was situated close to the modern Ostbahnhof, and its goods station (Wriezener Güterbahnhof) was extended between it and Warschauer Straße station. From 1867 to 1882, nearby the Wriezener Bahnhof, Old Ostbahnhof functioned as a passenger terminal.

== History ==
The Wriezener Bahnhof was built in 1903 at the end of a short spur from Lichtenberg station, as the dedicated terminus of the Wriezener Bahn (Berlin-Wriezen-Godków), opened in 1892.

From 1903 to 1924, it was a simple Bahnsteig (platform) part of the Schlesischer Bahnhof, named Schlesischer Bahnhof (Wriezener Bahnsteig), and it was not until 1924 that it was renamed "Wriezener Bahnhof". In 1949 the station was closed to passenger traffic and used as a goods and mail station.

In 2005 the tracks were removed and, in late 2006, a Metro supermarket and a Hellweg store were built in its place. Nowadays the area, owned by Deutsche Bahn, is probably earmarked for future estate projects. The old station building is the only surviving structure, and two roads (Am Wriezener Bahnhof and Wriezener Karree) remind us of the existence of the station, even if they are not actually located where the station once stood (but rather next to the Old Ostbahnhof or Küstriner Bahnhof).

== See also ==
- Berlin Ostbahnhof
- Berlin Old Ostbahnhof
