= Gustaf Kilman =

Swedish equestrian

Olympic medal record

Men's Equestrian
| Gold medal – first place | 1912 Stockholm | Team jumping |

Gustaf Olof Falhem Kilman (9 July 1882 – 21 February 1946) was a Swedish Army officer and horse rider who competed in the 1912 Summer Olympics and in the 1920 Summer Olympics.

In 1912, he and his horse Gåtan (The Riddle), were part of the Swedish equestrian team, which won the gold medal in the team jumping. The team also won the King of Italy's challenge trophy. Eight years later, he finished 15th in the individual jumping event with his horse Irving.

Kilman was a captain in the Swedish Army.

He died in Gothenburg in 1946, at the age of 63. The cause of death was suicide.
