= Fredrik Rosencrantz =

Swedish equestrian

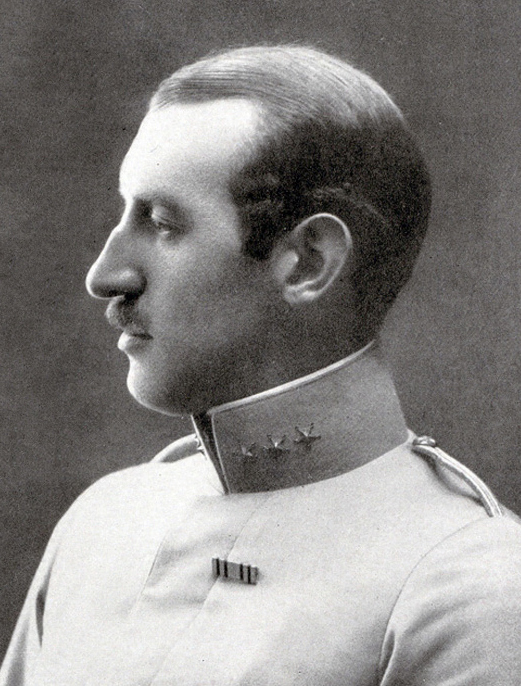

Personal information
- Full name: Fredrik Jakob Tage Ulfstand Rosencrantz
- Born: 26 October 1879 Benestad, Tomelilla, Sweden
- Died: 15 April 1957 (aged 77) Malmö, Sweden

Sport
- Sport: Horse riding
- Club: K6 IF, Ystad

Fredrik Jakob Tage Ulfstand Rosencrantz (26 October 1879 – 15 April 1957) was a Swedish Army captain and horse rider who competed in the 1912 Summer Olympics. He was a member of the Swedish team that won the gold medal in jumping; however, he was not awarded a medal because only three best riders from each team were counted, and he placed fourth.

Rosencrantz became ryttmästare in 1913 and was placed in the Life Regiment Hussars' reserve in 1928.
