= Oh Hiroshima =

Swedish post-rock band

- Origin: Kristinehamn, Sweden
- Genres: Post-rock, indie rock
- Years active: 2009–present
- Label: Pelagic Records
- Members: Jakob Hemström; Oskar Nilsson
- Past members: Leif Eliasson; Simon Axelsson

Oh Hiroshima is a Swedish post-rock band, founded in 2009 in Kristinehamn by Leif Eliasson and Jakob Hemström, who were later joined by Simon Axelsson and Hemström's younger brother Oskar Nilsson. The band is noted for its subdued electronic instrumentation, abstract guitar texturing, and use of vocal soundscapes.

Beginning as an experimental music project between Eliasson and Hemström, Nilsson officially joined the group as their drummer in 2011 during the writing process for debut album Resistance Is Futile, having before recorded bass with the group. Axelsson joined the band that same year as their bass player.

The first releases by Oh Hiroshima were the demo EPs Empty Places Full of Memories and Tomorrow, released in 2009 and 2010, respectively. Their first album, Resistance Is Futile, was self-released digitally in 2011. Their second album, In Silence We Yearn, was self-released digitally in November 2015, and on 1 July 2016, Fluttery Records re-issued the album on CD. A vinyl version followed on 2 December later that year through Napalm Records. In 2018, the band's debut LP was re-issued physically as well—on CD by Fluttery Records on 22 February, and on vinyl by Napalm Records on 7 December.

Founding guitarist Leif Eliasson departed from the band in July 2018. In October 2018, they announced that they had signed a deal with Napalm Records for their third album and on 26 July 2019, Oscillation was released. In January 2021, bassist Simon Axelsson announced he was leaving the band, but would join them on stage "whenever possible".

Once again a duo, the group released fourth studio album Myriad on 4 March 2022 via Napalm Records. They also released a music video for the first single Humane.

In 2024, the band released All Things Shining and in 2026, the band released And The Dead Tree Gives No Shelter, their fifth and sixth studio albums respectively. In 2026, they also announced rare reissues of their previous albums on colored vinyl, with all being released by Pelagic Records.

== Members ==
=== Current ===
- Jakob Hemström – guitars and vocals
- Oskar Nilsson – drums

=== Former ===
- Leif Eliasson – guitars, drums (early) (2011–2018)
- Simon Axelsson – bass guitar (2011–2022)

== Discography ==
Studio albums

- Resistance Is Futile (2011)
- In Silence We Yearn (2015)
- Oscillation (2019)
- Myriad (2022)
- All Things Shining (2024)
- And the Dead Tree Gives No Shelter (2026)

EPs

- Empty Places Full of Memories (2009)
- Tomorrow (2010)
