= Bernhard Karl von Koehne =

Russian numismatist (1817 – 1887)

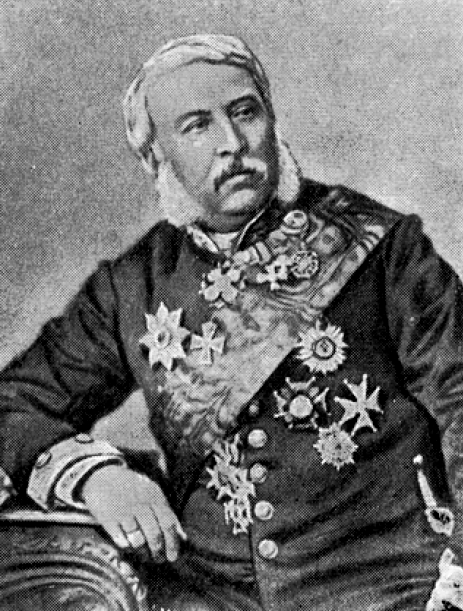
Baron Bernhard Karl von Köhne

Baron Bernhard Karl von Köhne (Russian: Бернгард (Борис) Васильевич Кёне; Boris Vasilievich Kene; 4 July 1817 – 5 February 1886) was born in Berlin, and moved to St Petersburg in 1845 to take up a post with the Russian civil service. He was the director of the section for arms in the heraldic department of the Russian senate, and a well known numismatist in imperial Russia. After falling out of favour with the scholarly circles in St Petersburg, he applied for Finnish citizenship in 1859, but it was not granted.

He was elected as an associate academician of the Belgian Royal Academy on 13 May 1861.
