= Adolf Lohse =

Prussian master builder and architect

Adolf Lohse (30 August 1807 in Berlin – 15 January 1867) was a Prussian master builder and architect. He was a student of Karl Friedrich Schinkel and one of his projects was the Schloss Albrechtsberg in Dresden.
