= Ernst Deloch =

German equestrian

Olympic medal record

Men's Equestrian
Bronze medal – third place	1912 Stockholm	Team jumping

Ernst-Hubertus Deloch (17 May 1886 – ?) was a German equestrian who competed in the 1912 Summer Olympics.

He won the bronze medal in the equestrian team jumping event.
