= Albrechtsberg Palace (Dresden) =

Coordinates: 51°03′54″N 13°47′41″E

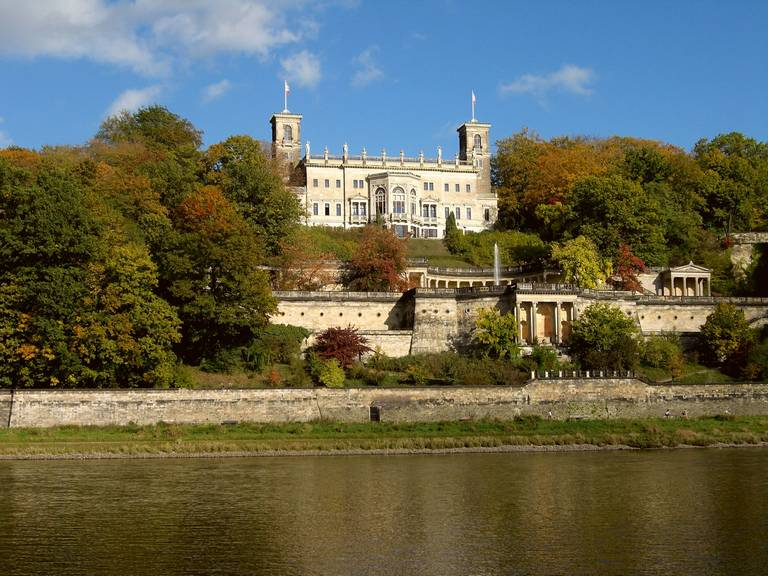
Albrechtsberg Palace from the south bank of the Elbe

Albrechtsberg Palace or Albrechtsberg Castle (German: Schloss Albrechtsberg) is a Neoclassical stately home above the Elbe river in the Loschwitz district of Dresden. It was erected in 1854 according to plans designed by the Prussian court and landscaping architect Adolf Lohse (1807–1867) at the behest of Prince Albert, younger brother of the Prussian king Frederick William IV.

== History ==
About 1803 James Ogilvy, 7th Earl of Findlater had acquired several vineyards in the Dresden Elbe Valley and had a manor house built on what later became the site of Albrechtsberg Palace. However, Ogilvy died in 1811 and did not witness its completion. Johann Gabriel Krebs bought the country house and rebuilt it into a restaurant that became the most popular day trip restaurant of Dresden, abode of Gottfried Semper and Richard Wagner.

Prince Albert of Prussia (1809–1872) in 1853 had secondly married Rosalie von Rauch, Countess of Hohenau (1820–1879); due to this morganatic marriage he was forced to leave the Prussian court and had to look for a new home abroad. He commissioned his chamberlain's wife, Baroness of Stockhausen to find an adequate domicile. She turned to the Saxon capital and acquired the area “Findlater's Vineyard”, including the manor and gardens, by order of the Prince for 16,000 Thalers.

Adolf Lohse, a student of Karl Friedrich Schinkel, designed the plans for the present-day castle. For the gardens, the Prince engaged the Prussian landscape architect Eduard Neide (1818–1883) who created the plan, though the court gardener Hermann Sigismund Neumann (1829–1880) accomplished them. Before Albrechtsberg, the adjacent Villa Stockhausen was completed. The villa was originally established for the chamberlain, but was used for the first year as domicile of the Prince and his wife. 1854 the castle was accomplished and the couple moved in.

After Prince Albrecht and Rosalie had died, their younger son Count Frederick of Hohenau (1857–1914) lived in the castle until his death, whereafter his elder brother Wilhelm (1854–1930) took over the residence. In 1925 Wilhelm finally had to sell the castle and the territory because of gambling debts. The new owner was the City of Dresden. After 1930, the gardens were opened for the public and redesigned as a recreational area for the citizens of Dresden under Mayor Wilhelm Külz.

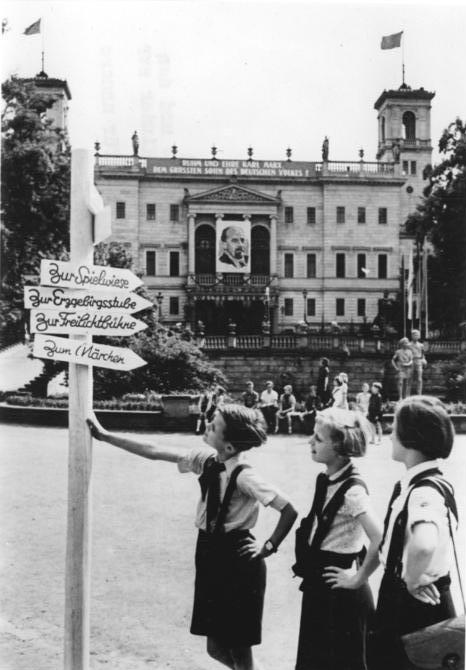
Albrechtsberg Pioneer Palace, 1953

During World War II the premises were used by the SA, whilst from 1943 the castle was used as a children’s home. All the three Elbe castles were spared from the bombing of Dresden, however occupied by the Red Army, with depredations and damages as the consequences. In 1948 the City of Dresden had to sell the castle to the Foreign Economic Trade Ministry of the Soviet Union. The castle was renovated by the architect Koeckritz. After the redecoration the castle was opened as a hotel called “Intourist.” In 1951, the East German Jugendheim GmbH Berlin repurchased the castle, and since 1952 the City of Dresden is once again the owner. The building was used as a Pioneers Palace by the Ernst Thälmann Pioneer Organisation.

In 1977 the castle was declared a historic monument. The step by step restoration continues to this day. In 1991 the “Hotel- und Gastättenschule Schloss Albrechtsberg GmbH” began operating in the castle. Today, the entire castle and grounds can be rented for special events. The operator of the castle since 1999 is the “Konzert- und Kongressgesellschaft mbH Dresden”

== Architecture ==
Adolf Lohse designed the castle in a late Neoclassical style that was very characteristic for the mid 19th century. During the interior completion just the most high class materials were used, for example marble, the most kingly wood and the white sandstone from Saxony. Deciding for the composition was the style of the classicism. For this style, especially important is the Grecian and Roman antiquity; the Italian Renaissance and its traditionally application. The guide for the composition of the castle was the Ville d'Este close to Rome.

For the creation of the park, the Prussia garden architect Eduard Neide 1818-1883 was engaged. However, the court gardener Hermann Sigismund Neumann carried them out. Under the management of the court gardener, four landscapes were created. Those were crossed by curved alleys that are go over bridges and a viaduct. These alleys passe applied ponds, rocks and a waterfall.

== Albrechtsberg today ==
Today, the HOGA Albrechtsberg castle is used as a private hotel and catering school. HOGA is the short cut for the German words Hotel and Gastronomie. Gudrun Lamm and Regina Kirschstein founded the school 1991. HOGA trained students for the exalted gastronomy.

The school offers a unique education model in Germany. Students are able to do their Abitur with a job at the job-related Gymnasium but this is just one of the few different school educations that are available at this school. In addition, students can go to Middle school, they can get general university qualification or they can go to the job – related Gymnasium. Furthermore, students can do their initial training as Hotel expert, Restaurant expert or a cook. Besides, students can receive a further education to a business economist; they can receive the college qualification in welfare or the education to a hotel assistant.

The castle is also available to rent for private or business events. All in all, there are ten halls and saloons, a sun patio and a park scenery that are available for renting.
