= In Silence We Yearn =

Studio album by Oh Hiroshima
- Released: November 4, 2015
- Genre: Post-rock; indie rock
- Length: 38:44
- Label: Fluttery Records; Napalm Records

Oh Hiroshima chronology
Resistance Is Futile (2011)	In Silence We Yearn (2015)	Oscillation (2019)

In Silence We Yearn is the second studio album by the Swedish post-rock band Oh Hiroshima, self-released digitally in November 2015. The album was re-released on CD on 1 July 2016 by Fluttery Records and on vinyl on 2 December by Napalm Records. In December 2016, American webzine Somewherecold ranked In Silence We Yearn No. 9 on their "Somewherecold Awards 2016" list.

== Track listing ==
No.	Title	Length
1.	"Ellipse"	4:01
2.	"Mirage"	9:33
3.	"Ruach"	5:18
4.	"Holding Rivers"	6:45
5.	"Aria"	5:08
6.	"Drones"	7:59
Total length:		38:44

== Personnel ==
- Jakob Hemström – guitars and vocals
- Leif Eliasson – guitars
- Oskar Nilsson – drums
- Simon Axelsson – bass guitar
