= Sigismund Freyer =

German equestrian

Olympic medal record

Men's Equestrian
Bronze medal – third place	1912 Stockholm	Team jumping

Sigismund Freyer (22 January 1881 – 14 February 1944) was a German horse rider who competed in the 1912 Summer Olympics. He was born in Neisse. He won the bronze medal in the equestrian team jumping event.
