= Sebastian Rauch =

German footballer

Personal information
- Full name: Sebastian Rauch
- Date of birth: 29 September 1981 (age 45)
- Place of birth: Germany
- Height: 1.85 m (6 ft 1 in)
- Position: Goalkeeper

Youth career
- 1991–2001: SV Babelsberg 03

Senior career*
Years	Team	Apps	(Gls)
2001–2013	SV Babelsberg 03 II	158	(1)
2001–2013	SV Babelsberg 03	81	(0)
2013–2015	Werderaner FC	57	(0)
Total		296	(1)

Managerial career
- 2009–2013: SV Babelsberg 03 (goalkeeping coach)
- * Club domestic league appearances and goals

Sebastian Rauch (born 29 September 1981) is a German retired footballer.
