= Adolf von Rauch (born 1798) =

German paper manufacturer

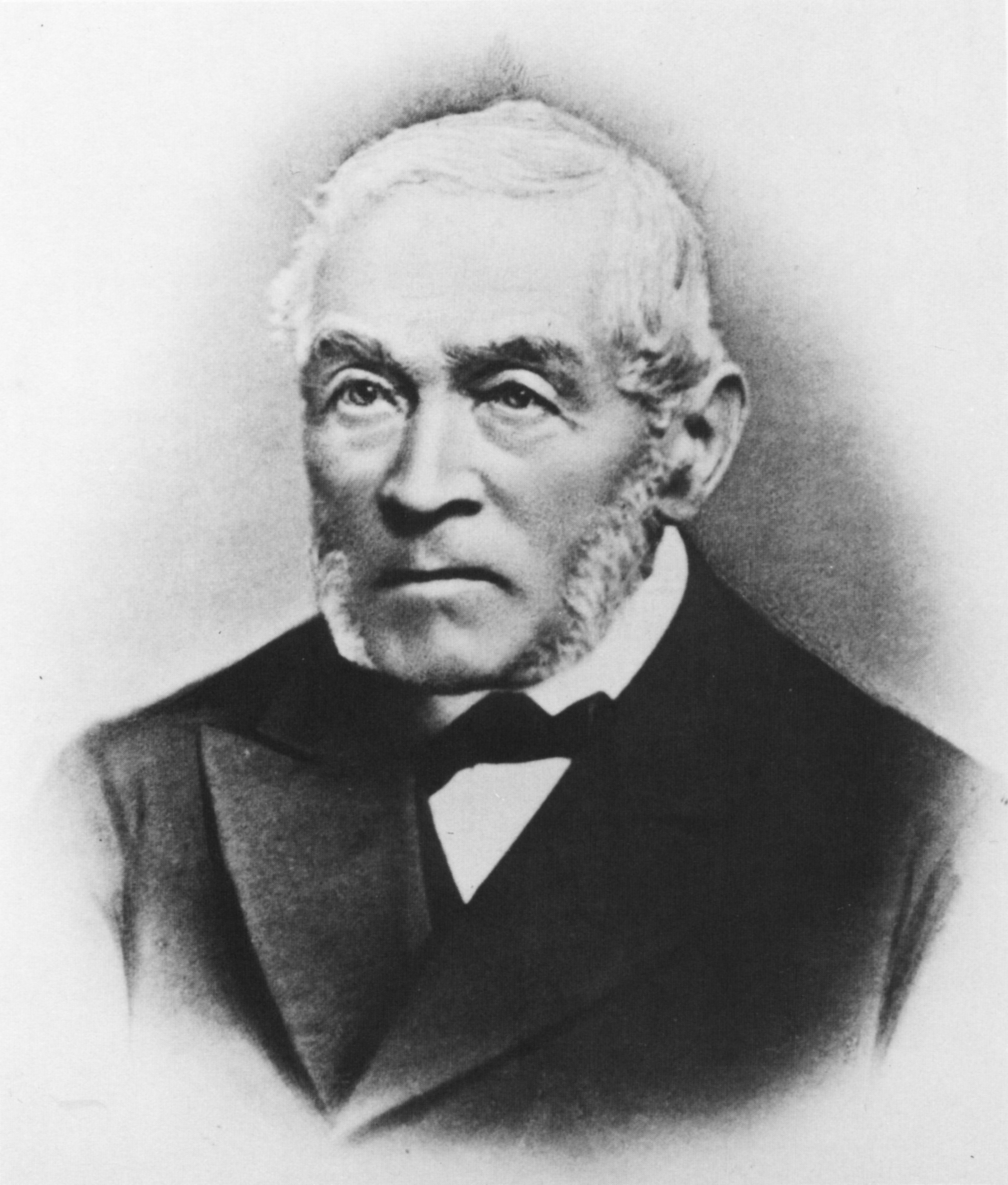

Adolf von Rauch (22 April 1798 - 12 December 1882) was a German paper manufacturer in Heilbronn, where he was born and died and where he was a major builder of social housing.
