= Gustav von Rauch =

Prussian general

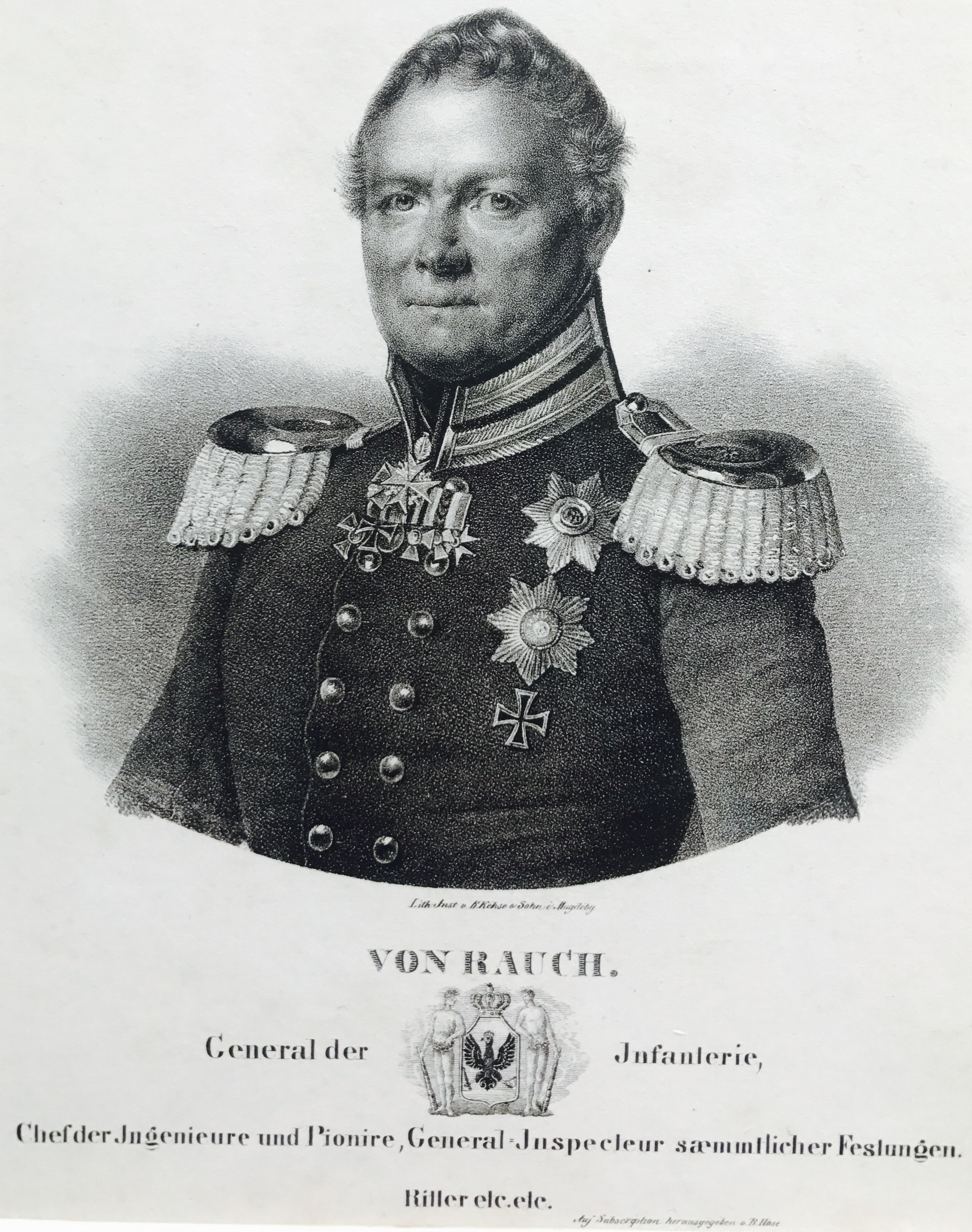
Gustav von Rauch, lithograph after a drawing by Franz Krüger (c. 1830)

Johann Justus Georg Gustav von Rauch (1 April 1774, in Braunschweig – 2 April 1841, in Berlin) was a Prussian general of the infantry and Minister of War from 1837 to 1841.

== Life ==
Gustav von Rauch was born as the eldest son of the later Prussian major general Bonaventura von Rauch (1740–1814) and his wife Johanna, née Bandel (1752–1828).

As a close collaborator of General Gerhard von Scharnhorst, Rauch belonged to the circle of Prussian army reformers. He was associated with the reform of the military education system, the further development of the Prussian fortifications and the reorganization of the engineering and pioneering systems. Rauch furthered the development of the Prussian Navy and had the first medical companies set up in the Prussian army. He was chief of staff from 1812–1813 and Inspector General of all fortresses and Chief of the Corps of Engineers from 1814–1837. He became the 16th honorary citizen of Berlin.

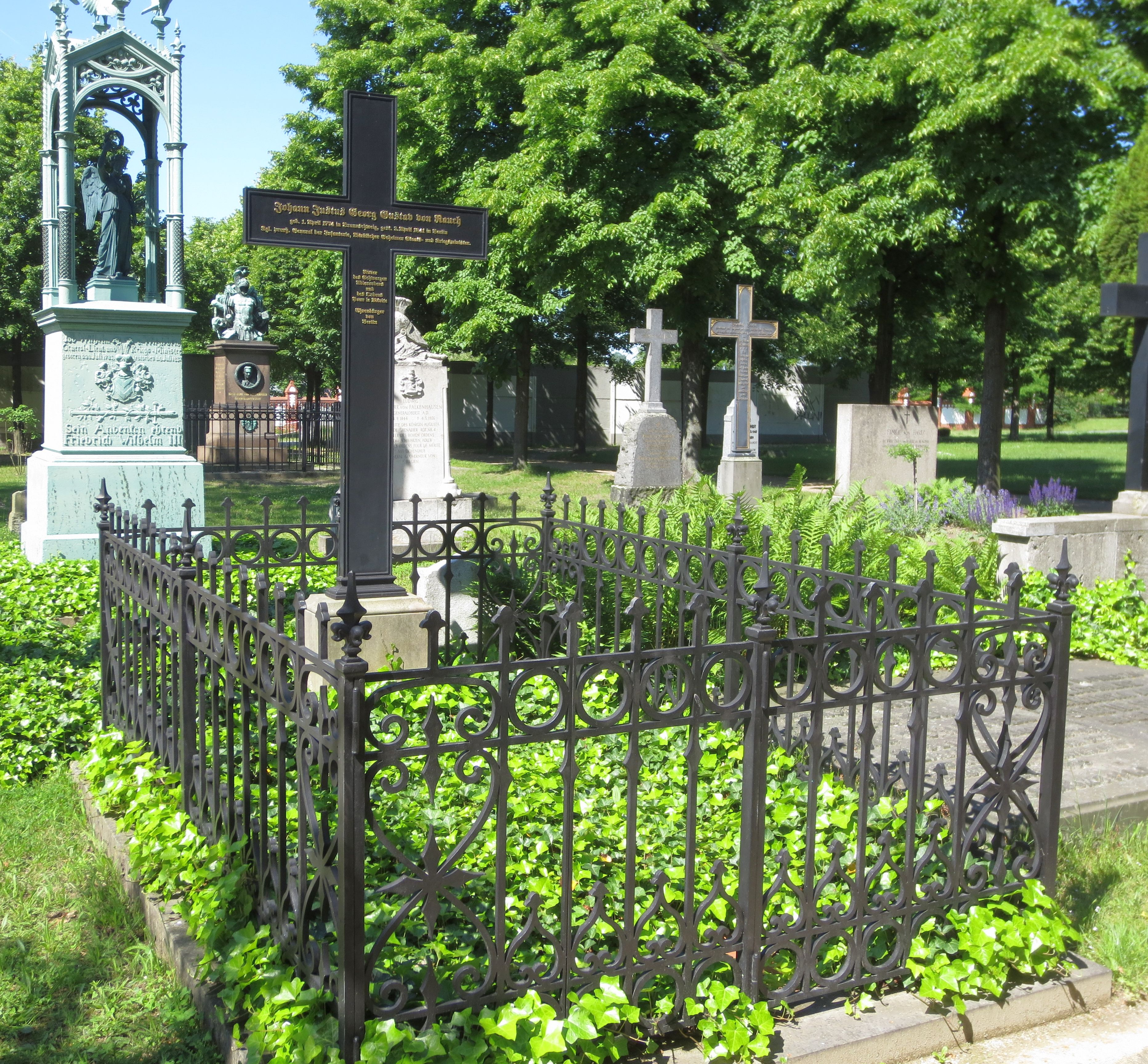
Grave of Gustav von Rauch on Berlin's Invalids' Cemetery

The memorial grave of Gustav von Rauch can be found in Berlin's Invalids' Cemetery (fully reconstructed after the German reunification).

== Marriage and issue ==
From 1802 Rauch was initially married to Caroline von Geusau (1780–1867). After their divorce Rosalie von Holtzendorff (1790–1862) became his second wife in 1816.

His first marriage produced one son:

- Adolf von Rauch (1805–1877), Prussian Chamberlain to Princess Louise of Prussia, major in the Gardes du Corps regiment and chairman of the Berlin Numismatic Society, married in 1836 to Therese von Ziegler (1817–1857)

Children of the second marriage are:

- Gustav Waldemar (1819–1890), Prussian general of the cavalry and head of the Royal Prussian State Gendarmerie, married in 1848 to Polyxena von Stéritsch (1823–1859) (from Russian nobility)
- Rosalie (1820–1879), lady-in-waiting to Princess Marianne of Prussia, in 1853 married to Prince Albrecht of Prussia, the youngest brother of King Frederick William IV of Prussia and William I, German Emperor (as his second, morganatic wife, named Countess of Hohenau)
- Fedor (1822–1892), Chief Equerry to the German Emperors, vice-president of the Union-Klub in Berlin, married in 1856 to Countess Elisabeth von Waldersee (1837–1914), lady-in-waiting to Grand Duchess consort Marie von Mecklenburg-Strelitz
- Albert (1829–1901), Prussian general of the infantry and head of the Royal Prussian State Gendarmerie, married in 1866 to Elisabeth von Bismarck-Briest (1845–1923)
