= Holtzendorff =

Holtzendorff or von Holtzendorff can refer to:

- Holtzendorff (noble family) (German: (pl.) die Herren von Holtzendorff), a Brandenburgian (Old Märkisch) noble family, an Uradel der Uckermark, later Silesia, Ostpreußen, Pommerania, Royal Saxony, and Mecklenburg.
- Georg Holtzendorff, 19th-century German painter
- Henning von Holtzendorff (1853–1919), a German admiral
- Joachim Wilhelm Franz Philipp von Holtzendorff (1829–1889), a German jurist
