= Fedor von Rauch =

Prussian military personnel

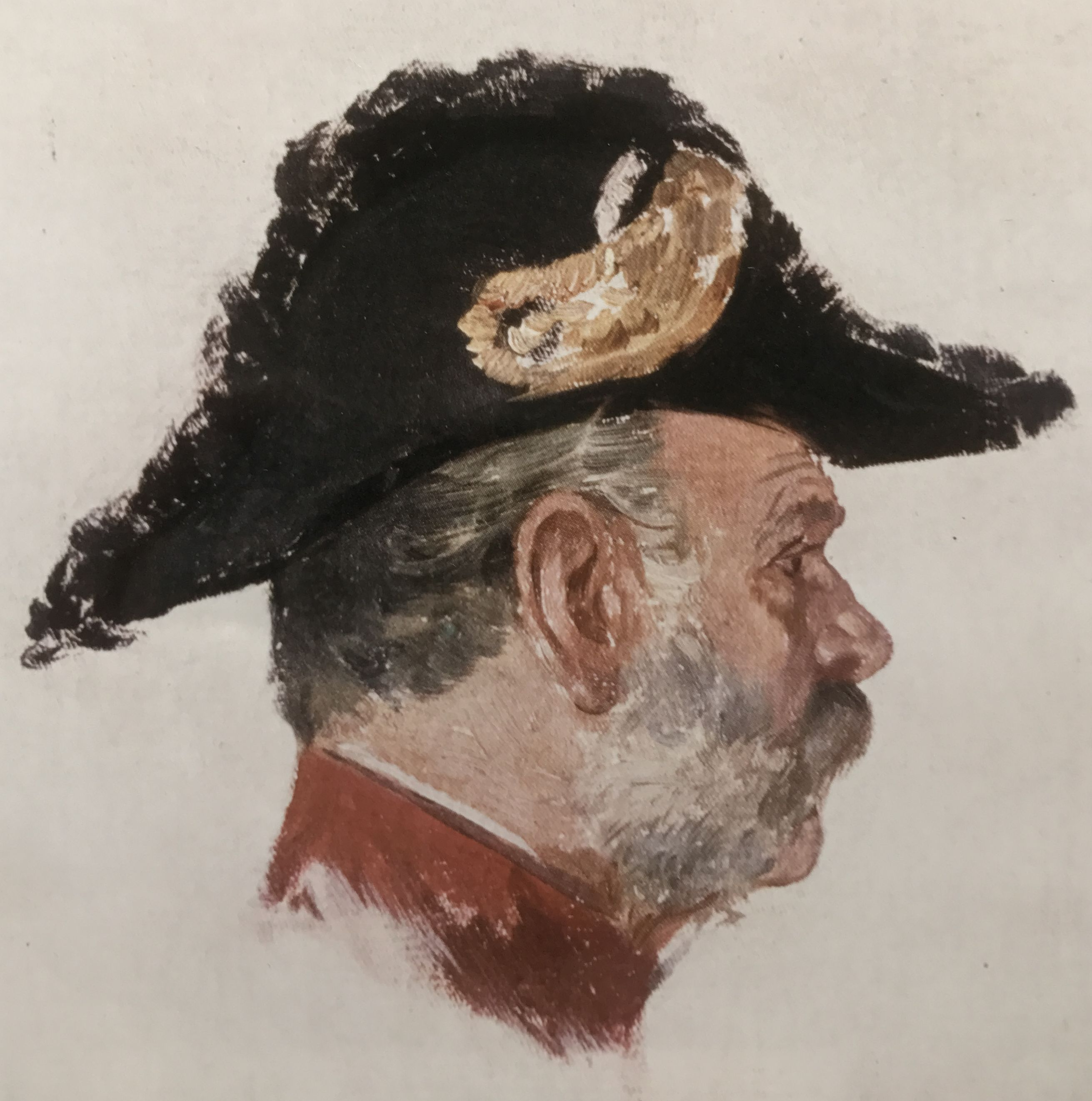
Study of Fedor von Rauch by Anton von Werner, c. 1870

Fedor Alexander Gustav von Rauch (8 August 1822 in Berlin - 15 January 1892) was a cavalry officer in the Prussian Army and son of the Prussian Minister of War and general of the infantry Gustav von Rauch.

== Biography ==
Fedor von Rauch was born in Berlin on 8 August 1822. He became 'Oberstallmeister' (chief equerry) on the privy councils of the German Emperors William I, Frederick III and Wilhelm II. He also took a major part in horse breeding and racing, becoming vice-president of the Union Club in Berlin (modelled on the British Jockey Club). In 1856 Fedor von Rauch married Elisabeth Countess von Waldersee (1837–1914), lady-in-waiting to Grand Duchess consort Marie von Mecklenburg-Strelitz.
