= Gustav Waldemar von Rauch =

Prussian cavalry general

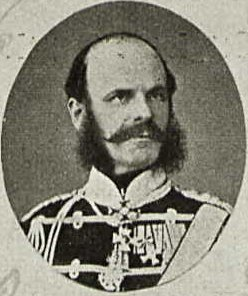
Gustav Waldemar von Rauch, c. 1866

Gustav Waldemar von Rauch (30 January 1819 in Berlin - 7 May 1890 in Berlin) was a general of the cavalry in the Prussian Army. He was born and died in Berlin. He was the son of Gustav von Rauch.
