= Countess Louise Auguste Henriette of Stolberg-Stolberg =

German noblewoman (1799–1875)

Louise Auguste Henriette (13 January 1799 - 15 August 1875), was a German noblewoman, a member of the House of Stolberg by both birth and marriage. She was also a notorious Lyric poet, translator and editor.

== Early life ==
Born in Stolberg, she was the only child born of the first marriage of Frederick Charles August Alexander, Hereditary Count of Stolberg-Stolberg (1769-1805) with Countess Marianne Diderica Frederica Wilhelmine von der Marck (1780-1814), an illegitimate daughter of King Frederick William II of Prussia.

== Biography ==
After the divorce of her parents, which took place in the year of her birth, Louise moved with her father to Denmark, where he, on 4 March 1800, contracted a second marriage with Countess Constanze Henriette Frederica Knuth-Knuthenborg, Landgravine Gyldensteen (1774–1827), great-granddaughter of Augustus II the Strong. One year later (on 14 March 1801), Louise's mother also remarried, to the Polish Baron Kaspar of Miaskowski (1771–1813).

Her only paternal half-sister was born in Copenhagen; Isidora Alexandria Mathilde (13 June 1802 – Plön, 3 March 1830), by marriage Countess von Luckner; however, this union also ended in divorce in the spring of 1804, and shortly after Louise's father married again, to Countess Henriette of Jett in the city of Regensburg on 22 March 1804. Twenty-one months later, on 23 December 1805, the Hereditary Count died in Darmstadt.

After a long stay in Funen, Louise finally reunited with her mother (who married for a third time to the French Chevalier Etienne de Thierry in 1807) in Paris, where she attended a Pensionnat.

Shortly after her mother's death in 1814, the fifteen-year-old Louise came to the court of her uncle, King Frederick William III of Prussia, where she and her cousin, the Crown Prince (future King Frederick William IV) became close friends. After he ascended the throne in 1840, Louise became a staunch royalist.

Her father's youngest brother Joseph Christian Ernest Louis (21 June 1771 – 27 December 1839), became the new Hereditary Count of Stolberg-Stolberg, and assumed the Comital title after his own father's death on 2 August 1815. Three years later, on 22 May 1819, he married his niece Louise in Charlottenburg.

She apparently suffered for her tumultuous family: "The relationships with my stepmothers are so cold!" she confessed in 1841 to Karl August Varnhagen von Ense, which he noted in his diary. For the rest of her life, she kept a portrait of her mother and a small bust of her grandmother, the famous Countess of Lichtenau, close at hand.

== Countess of Stolberg ==
After her marriage, Louise and her husband settled at Stolberg Castle and spent every summer at their country estate in Rottleberode, where she developed her skills in writing. She gave birth to five children:

1. Alfred (Stolberg, 23 November 1820 – Rottleberode, 24 January 1903), Count and from 22 March 1893 Prince of Stolberg.
2. Mathilde (Stolberg, 23 March 1823 – Villa Ingenheim, Potsdam, 13 May 1873).
3. Elisabeth (Stolberg, 28 October 1825 – Hirschberg, 10 January 1907), married on 23 May 1861 to Count Julius von Ingenheim (simultaneously first-cousin and nephew of her mother. Son of Louise's half sister Eugénie and Gustav Adolf Wilhelm von Ingenheim).
4. Marie Agnes (Stolberg, 14 October 1832 – Stolberg, 18 April 1883).
5. Louise (Stolberg, 15 December 1835 – Leipzig, 25 March 1872).

After the death of her husband (on 27 December 1839), Louise took over the guardianship and administration of his domains, until her son reached the formal age of majority. The years of her long widowhood — except for a few trips to Berlin to visit her maternal half-sister, Josephine von Miaskowski, by marriage Countess von Königsmark-Berlitt (d. 1862), with whom she appears to have had a close relationship — were spent entirely in Stolberg.

"She provides all the best efforts.", Varnhagen wrote, "To hold a high degree and culture, she mediated, exhilarated, and practices the most beautiful human business destined to females, worthy of her presence, by word and meaning, if the writing is not enough".

== Literary Activity ==
Initially Louise published her works anonymously, but later under her variously spelled versions of her name, she primarily published poems which expressed her political beliefs. She was convinced of the divinity of the King, and profess to him unreserved devotion. Three collections of poems where dedicated to him under the title of "King Songs" (German: Königslieder). She condemned the March Revolution of 1848-49 in the strongest possible terms. As the request of the Democrats in the Second Chamber of the Prussian National Assembly, the Cadet Corps wanted to convert to civilian schools, she wrote to her old friend, the king, a letter of protest. In addition, she occasionally wrote for the ultraconservative Kreuzzeitung.

Despite that because of her beliefs she stand in irreconcilable contrast to the freedom aspirations of the pre-March Young Germany group, she was well-received as a writer. In her work Psychorama eines Scheintodten, she wrote satirical verses and epigrams against Heinrich Heine and Georg Herwegh. By contrast, notably contemporaries such as Alexander von Humboldt, Friedrich Rückert, George Sand and Rahel Varnhagen dedicated to her poetic tributes.

With Rückert, Louise also manifested her interest in the poetry of Persia and operational language studies to translate from Persian language. A series of essays that should have been wrote in her estate must be considered as lost.

== Letters ==
Louise had a detailed correspondence with many contemporary authors, including Bettina von Arnim, Karl August Varnhagen, Friedrich von Bodenstedt and Ida, Countess von Hahn-Hahn. Prince George of Prussia used her dramatic manuscripts as a review for his own literary work. The 38 volumes of her complete collection of letters must largely be considered lost today. Parts are kept in archives and private collections which are occasionally shown as individual pieces to trade in autographs.

== Last Years ==
After the death of Frederick William IV in 1861, she dedicated the second part of her Königslieder to his widow, Queen Elisabeth. The reign of his successor, the future German Emperor William I and the work of Bismarck were of less interest to her.

Her health weakened during the spring of 1875. Louise died at Stolberg on the 15th of August of that year, aged 76.

== Work ==
- Königslieder, Stolberg am Harz, Leipzig 1841.
- Psychorama eines Scheintodten, Leipzig 1847.
- Königslieder. Zweite Reihe, Berlin 1858.
- (ed.) Varnhagen von Ense in Stolberg. Unterdrückte Blätter aus seinem Tagebuch, o. O., ca. 1862.
- Die grüne Stube, Berlin 1865.
- Zum Gedächtniß König Friedrich Wilhelms IV. von Preußen. Aeltere und neuere Königslieder, Berlin 1867.
