= Hans Rudolf von Bischoffwerder =

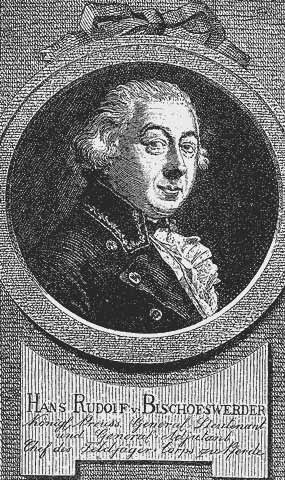
Johann Rudolf von Bischoffwerder

Johann “Hans” Rudolf von Bischoffwerder (born November 13, 1741, in Ostramondra; died October 30 or 31, 1803 in Marquardt) was a Prussian major general and advisor to Frederick William II of Prussia.

== Biography ==
Hans Rudolf came from the Saxon noble family von Bischofswerder. His father, Hans Rudolf von Bischoffwerder (1707–1754), was a cavalry captain in Electoral Saxony, became a major and adjutant to Maurice of Saxony in France, and died as a Dutch colonel in The Hague. His wife, Henriette Wilhelmine von Bünau, was the daughter of the owner of the Ostramondra manor, who died in 1723, which fell to her two brothers as a male fiefdom.

Hans Rudolf studied law at the University of Halle from 1756. On November 25, 1758, he was accepted into the Masonic lodge “Philadelphia zu den drei goldenen Armen” (Philadelphia of the Three Golden Arms) in Halle. In 1760, he joined the cuirassier regiment “Leib-Carabiniers”, where he was appointed ensign in 1761. In 1762, he took part in the Battle of Freiberg. After the Peace of Hubertusburg, Bischoffwerder resigned in July 1763 and became chamberlain at the Saxon court and equerry to Duke Charles of Courland. In 1764, he married Christiane von Wilcke, the daughter of a Saxon chamberlain. In 1765, he joined the Scottish lodge “Zur gekrönten Schlange” (The Crowned Serpent) in Görlitz, which adhered to the Strict Observance, and soon thereafter assumed the office of Superior and Protector of the VII Province in Saxony within this system. As Knight “Eques a grypho” (Latin: Knight of the Griffin), he became one of the leading figures of Masonry in Saxony.

He was fond of magic, alchemy, and mysticism, and fell prey to the fraud of Gottlieb Franz von Gugomos (1742–1816) and the spirit conjuring of Johann Georg Schrepfers, whose mysterious death in 1774 he witnessed. Later, he allegedly used Schrepfers' apparatus for producing ghostly apparitions for his own purposes. He also had contact with the Count of Saint Germain, which he visited in 1777 on behalf of his close friend, the Duke of Frederick August of Braunschweig-Oels, in order to form his own opinion of him and his familiarity with the Rosicrucians.

In 1778, Bischoffwerder returned to Prussian service and entered the circle of the crown prince, later King Frederick William II, whose trust he gained. Together with the influential minister Johann Christoph von Wöllner, he exploited the crown prince's credulity and interested him in séances, which he cleverly staged. Bischoffwerder, a member of the Order of the Golden and Rosy Cross in Berlin-Potsdam, finally succeeded in getting the crown prince to join the Order of the Golden and Rosy Cross in 1781 under the name Ormerus Magnus.

After his accession to the throne in 1786, Frederick William II promoted Bischoffwerder to lieutenant colonel and appointed him his wing and, in 1789, adjutant general, in 1790 head of the mounted military police corps, and in 1791 major general. Bischoffwerder gained increasing influence at court. He was awarded the Order of the Black Eagle for his services.

In Briesnitz near Dresden, the country estate of Kabbalist Wolf Benjamin Eibeschütz (son of Jonathan Eibeschütz) meetings were held with Austrian diplomats to strengthen the Dresden–Berlin–Vienna axis. At the same time, Kabbalistic and Rosicrucian matters were also discussed.

As a trusted advisor, he persuaded the king in 1790 to seek rapprochement with Austria and to agree on a common stance against revolutionary France in the Reichenbach Convention, which led to the First Coalition War in 1792. The negative outcome of this war led to the king's departure from Bischoffwerder, but as Prussian foreign minister, he still received large estates from the king during the partition of Poland in 1793. After Frederick William II's death in 1797, he presented the royal insignia to the new ruler, but was dismissed and retired in 1798, dying on October 30 or 31, 1803, at his estate in Marquardt near Potsdam.

== Family ==
He was married twice. His first wife in 1764 was Luise Christiane von Wilcke, granddaughter of General Ernst Ludwig von Wilcke, from the House of Ammelshain. from whom he divorced in 1794. They had three daughters:

- Marianne (1767–1789)
- Charlotte (1767–1812)
- Caroline Erdmuthe Christiane († 1842)

His second wife in 1795 was Wilhelmine Katharine von Tarrach (1757–1833). Her father was the Privy Financial Councilor von Tarrach in Tilsit. It was also her second marriage. Her first husband was Count Franz Ignatz von Pinto (1725–1788). The couple had one son and three daughters:

- Johanna Rudolfine Luitgarde (1794–1869) ⚭ Konstantin von Witzleben (1784–1845), Prussian lieutenant general
- Anna Blanca Hedwig (1797–1824) ⚭ 1816 August Friedrich Karl von Maltzahn (1793–1825)
- Bertha (1799–1824) ⚭ Heinrich von Ostau (1790–1872), Prussian Major General

With his son Lieutenant General Hans Rudolf Wilhelm Ferdinand (1795–1858), the Bischoffwerder family died out in Prussia.

== Literature ==
- Theodor Fontane: Marquardt von 1795 bis 1803. In: Ost-Havelland. Abschnitt Potsdam und Umgebung, Kapitel Marquardt. Vol. 1. Wilhelm Hertz (Bessersche Buchhandlung), Berlin 1873. Deutsches Textarchiv.
- Julius Hartmann (1875). "Bischoffwerder, Hans Rudolf von" . Allgemeine Deutsche Biographie (in German). Vol. 2. Leipzig: Duncker & Humblot. pp. 675–678.
- Johannes Schultze: Hans Rudolf von Bischoffwerder. In: Historische Kommission für die Provinz Sachsen und für Anhalt. (Hrsg.): Mitteldeutsche Lebensbilder. 3. Band: Lebensbilder des 18. und 19. Jahrhunderts. Selbstverlag, Magdeburg 1928, S. 134–155.
- Kurt von Priesdorff: Soldatisches Führertum. Band 2, Hanseatische Verlagsanstalt Hamburg, o. O. [Hamburg], o. J. [1937], DNB-IDN 367632772, p. 346–348, NO. 826.
- Otto zu Stolberg-Wernigerode (1955). "Bischoffwerder, Hans Rudolf von". Neue Deutsche Biographie (in German). Vol. 2. Berlin: Duncker & Humblot. pp. 266–266. (full text online).
- Eugen Lennhoff, Oskar Posner, Dieter A. Binder: Internationales Freimaurerlexikon. 5. überarbeitete und erweiterte Neuauflage der Ausgabe von 1932. Herbig, München 2006, ISBN 3-7766-2478-7.
- Ferdinand Runkel: Geschichte der Freimaurerei, Königswinter 2006, ü. 45–46. ISBN 3-933070-96-1.
- Karlheinz Gerlach: Die Freimaurer im alten Preußen 1738–1806. Die Logen zwischen mittlerer Oder und Niederrhein. Studienverlag Innsbruck 2007, ISBN 978-3-7065-4037-7.
