= Sophie von Dönhoff =

German lady-in-waiting

Sophie Friederike Juliane von Dönhoff
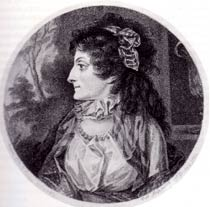
- Born: 17 October 1768
- Died: 28 January 1838 (aged 69)
- Spouse: Frederick William II of Prussia (m. 1790; sep. 1792) (morganatic)
- Issue: Friedrich Wilhelm, Count Brandenburg (illegitimate)

Countess Sophie Friederike Juliane von Dönhoff (17 October 1768 – 28 January 1838) was a German lady-in-waiting and a morganatic spouse by bigamy to King Frederick William II of Prussia.

== Life ==
She was the daughter of Count Friedrich Wilhelm von Dönhoff and Anna Sophie von Langermann und Erlencamp.

In 1789, she became the lady-in-waiting of the Prussian queen, Frederika Louisa of Hesse-Darmstadt.

=== Marriage ===
She was described as a talented pianist and singer, admired for her attractive figure and said to be of an imperious disposition; she attracted the king's attention soon after the death of Julie von Voß, and insisted upon the same conditions as her predecessor, that is the consent of the queen to a "left-handed marriage" and a dowry. Sophie married Frederick at Charlottenburg Palace 11 April 1790.

In contrast to Julie von Voß, who had behaved with discreet gentleness, Sophie von Dönhoff was described as an haughty insolent upstart who attempted to be treated like a queen rather than as a morganatic consort by demanding everyone at court save the queen give precedence to her. She also tried to influence the king against Wilhelmine von Lichtenau and Bischoff Werder and participate in the affairs of state, advising him against participation in the war against France by threatening him that she would "give him up altogether, if he entered with such levity upon so important and difficult an undertaking" as that of the invasion of France.

The king, however, advised her to refrain from politics, was repelled by her temperament and started to neglect her, which caused her to react with more rage. One night at a concert in at Potsdam, she caused a famous scene when suddenly rushing with disheveled hair to the assembly and laid her infant at the king's feet, exclaiming: "There, take back your property!" In 1792, the couple separated after a row.

In 1805, Sophie bought a farm, Oberbarnim, which became her occupation for the rest of her life.

== Children ==
- Count Friedrich Wilhelm von Brandenburg (24 January 1792 – 6 November 1850), Prime Minister of Prussia
- Countess Sophie (Julie) von Brandenburg (4 January 1793 – 29 January 1848), married to Frederick Ferdinand, Duke of Anhalt-Köthen

== See also ==
- Wilhelmine von Lichtenau
- Elisabeth Helene von Vieregg
