= Frederica Louisa of Hesse-Darmstadt =

Queen of Prussia from 1786 to 1797

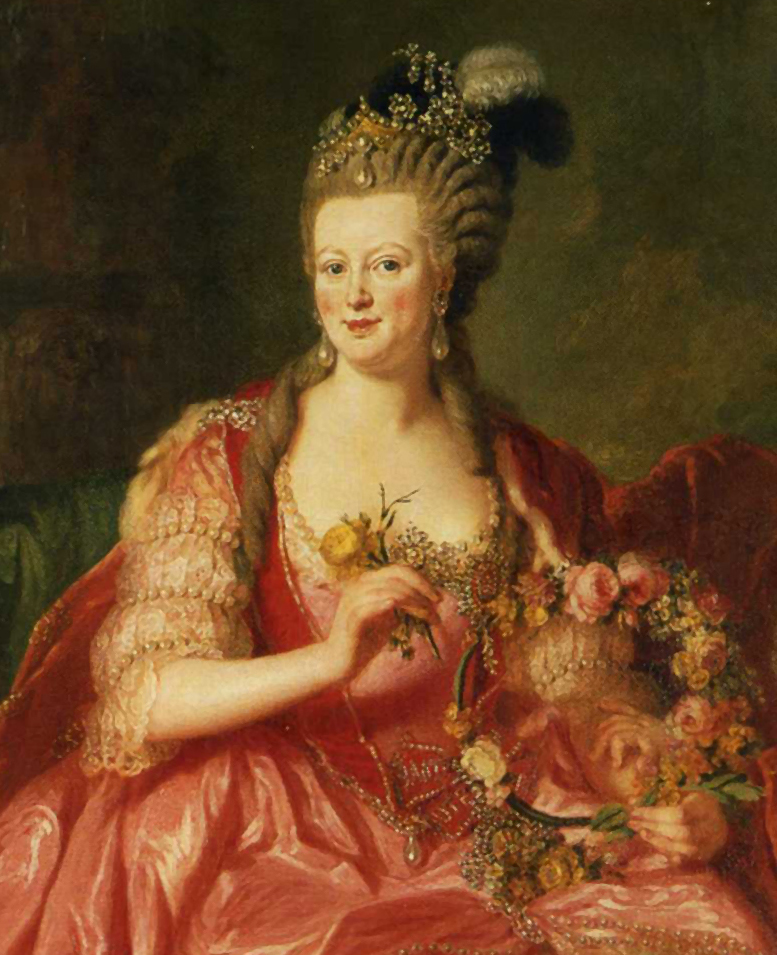
- Portrait by Anna Dorothea Therbusch, 1775

Queen consort of Prussia Electress consort of Brandenburg
- Tenure: 17 August 1786 – 16 November 1797
- Born: 16 October 1751; Prenzlau, Electorate of Brandenburg, Holy Roman Empire
- Died: 25 February 1805 (aged 53); Schloss Montbijou, Berlin, Kingdom of Prussia, Holy Roman Empire
- Spouse: Frederick William II of Prussia (m. 1769; died 1797)
- Issue: Frederick William III; Prince Louis; Wilhelmina, Queen of the Netherlands; Augusta, Electress of Hesse; Prince Henry; Prince Wilhelm
- House: Hesse-Darmstadt (by birth); Hohenzollern (by marriage)
- Father: Louis IX, Landgrave of Hesse-Darmstadt
- Mother: Countess Palatine Caroline of Zweibrücken

Frederica Louisa of Hesse-Darmstadt (German: Friederike Luise; 16 October 1751 – 25 February 1805) was Queen of Prussia and Electress of Brandenburg as the second wife of King Frederick William II.

== Early life ==
Frederica Louisa of Hesse-Darmstadt was born on 16 October, 1751 in Prenzlau . She was the daughter of Louis IX, Landgrave of Hesse-Darmstadt, and Countess Palatine Caroline of Zweibrücken. She was the sister of Grand Duchess Louise of Saxe-Weimar-Eisenach, as well as Louis I, Grand Duke of Hesse.

=== Marriage ===
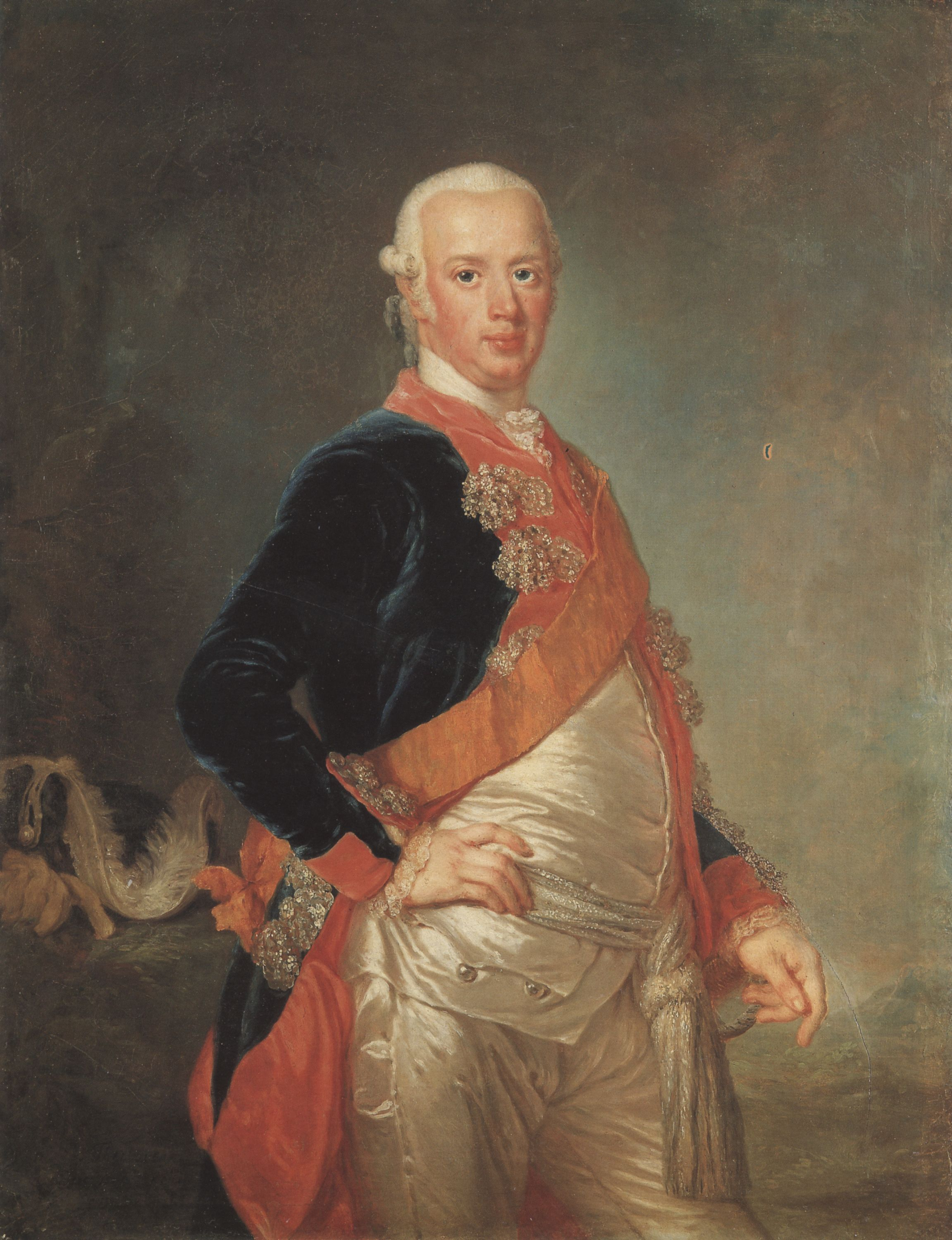
Frederica Louisa's husband, Frederick William II, by Therbusch, 1773

Frederica Louisa was selected to marry Frederick William immediately after his divorce from Elisabeth Christine of Brunswick-Lüneburg, after Margravine Philippine of Brandenburg-Schwedt and Sophia Albertina of Sweden had been suggested. Her mother was highly admired by Frederick the Great. The wedding was performed on 14 July 1769 at the Charlottenburg Palace.

Frederica Louisa was described as solid and sensible and with an agreeable conversation, though lacking of beauty and any particular intellectual abilities. Wraxall said of her: "She is an amiable, virtuous, and pleasing woman, possessing neither the personal attractions, nor the graces of her predecessor, but exempt from her errors and defects. She is of the middle size, her countenance agreeable, though not handsome, her manners easy and engaging, her character estimable and formed to excite universal respect." Frederick William called her his "Hessische Lieschen", or "Hessian Lizzie", but did not show her much appreciation or attention and neglected her to indulge in his own pleasures. The marriage was not happy, and Frederick William had numerous lovers, most notably Wilhelmine von Lichtenau, with whom he had a relationship from the same year he married Frederica Louisa until his death.

Her position was somewhat difficult because of the divorce and exile of the first wife of her spouse, and King Frederick the Great never showed her much favor and did in fact make a point of refusing her the favors and privileges he had formerly given her predecessor; however, when it was announced by the queen that Frederica was pregnant for the first time, joy was nearly universal. She mainly resided in Potsdam, "in the most monotonous and wearisome seclusion, neglected by her husband, slighted by the king, and seldom allowed even the diversion of a visit to Berlin".

Reportedly, she did not give much attention to her children and was blamed for having a part in their lack of education: "Frederic William III. received the very worst of educations; so beyond all measure bad as only that of a crown Prince can be. His father troubled himself more about his illegitimate than his legitimate children. They were left to their mother. She, constantly embroiled with her finances, often did not see them for days together; they were therefore left to the care of their attendants and of their misanthropic Hofmeister Benisch."

=== Queen ===
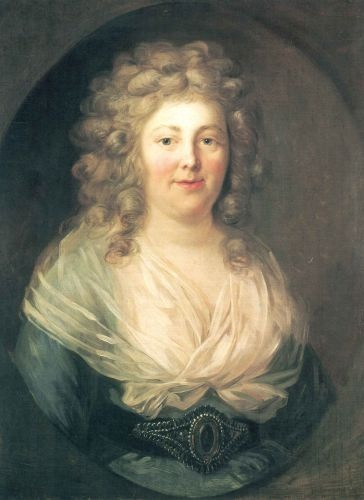
Portrait of Frederica Louisa by Anton Graff, c. 1789

Frederica Louisa became queen of Prussia upon the accession of Frederick William to the throne in 1786, and she left Potsdam for Berlin, where she was to perform the ceremonial role of queen and regularly host drawing room-receptions for the royal court, the nobility and foreign envoys. She unintentionally provoked a diplomatic incident on her first court reception: unaware of the custom that the queen should only play with her subjects, she asked the Austrian and Russian ministers to join her at her gambling table, which caused the French minister to take offence on behalf of his nation for his exclusion.

The court of Frederick William was described as disorganized and ill-managed, and this was regarded to be the case of the household of Frederica Louisa as well. She was given an allowance of fifty-one thousand crowns per annum as queen, which was not sufficient to cover her expenses as she was "generous in her tastes and somewhat profuse in her habits", and Mirabeau relates how she was at one occasion unable to pay for the wood to supply the fires in her apartments, while her husband spent thirty thousand thalers annually on his mistress.

While the favorites and lovers of the king often participated in the affairs of state, she was allowed no political influence whatsoever, and Mirabeau said that "no Queen of Prussia of all Queens the least influential was ever so uninfluential" as the consort of Frederick William II. Wraxall remarks however, that although the queen "had not captivated the affections, or secured the constancy of her husband, she possessed at least his esteem, and received from him every proof of respect."

In 1787, she was asked to consent to the bigamy of her husband the king to her lady-in-waiting Julie von Voß. Her brother-in-law Duke Karl August of Saxe-Weimar was appointed ambassador in the negotiations between the king and queen, and Frederica Louisa was eventually obliged to agree. Reportedly, she laughed and exclaimed: "Oh, yes! I will give my consent, but it shall be dearly paid for!" She finally consented to the king's bigamy on condition that he pay her debts, which amounted to one hundred thousand crowns. During this affair, the German theatre gave the play "Inez de Castro" several nights in a row, it attracted great attention that the queen always retired during the performance of the fourth act, where the prince makes vows of passionate love to the maid of honour, and it was speculated whether this was a demonstration or not. Mirabeau commented: "It is difficult to determine, on account of the turbulent and versatile, but not particularly weak, character of this princess, whether she acted thus intentionally or not." In 1790, she was obliged to consent to a second bigamy of her husband to another one of her ladies-in-waiting, Sophie von Dönhoff, who reportedly insulted the queen by demanding a queen's precedence at court. When Wilhelmine, Gräfin von Lichtenau was finally given the title of countess, Frederica Louisa was obliged to receive her officially at court and present her with her portrait set in brilliants upon the advice of her own favorites, her Oberhofmeister Wittgenstein and her gentlewoman of the chamber.

When the king fell ill in 1796, he was tended by von Lichtenau, who after his temporary recovery in the spring of 1797 hosted the opera La Morte di Cleopatra by Nasolini in her garded, to which the queen was commanded to attend, an occasion which attracted a lot of attention and was described by Dampmartin:

"that the Queen, the crown Prince and his consort, as well as the other royal Princes and Princesses, trembled with indignation at the humiliating constraint which made them the guests of a woman, whose very neighbourhood they felt to be an insult. The King bore upon his pallid countenance the tokens of mortal disease. The kindhearted Queen writhed her lips into a sickly smile. The crown Prince could not conceal his violent agitation; he cast stolen glances alternately at his tenderly-loved mother, and his adored wife, as if he could not take in the possibility of beholding them in the apartments of the mistress of his father [...] At some strophes of the opera, in which Octavia laments the infidelity of Mark Antony, all eyes involuntarily turned upon the Queen, and she concealed her face in her handkerchief." During the following public celebrations of the king's recovery, the queen avoided to attend by claiming to be sick while Lichtenau presided at the king's side.

On his deathbed, the king was attended by Wilhelmine Lichtenau in Potsdam, while the queen stayed in Berlin and visited him once a week. When he died, he asked her to conduct his wife and son to the ante-chamber, and asked her to tell them his farewell. Frederica Louisa was touched and embraced Lichtenau and thanked her for her devoted care of her husband, but the crown prince was judgmental. When the king asked Lichtenau "What did my son say to you?", and was answered "Not a word", he replied: "Not a word of thanks? Then I will see no one else," which the royal family blamed Lichtenau for, thinking it was her decision rather than his.

=== Queen Dowager ===
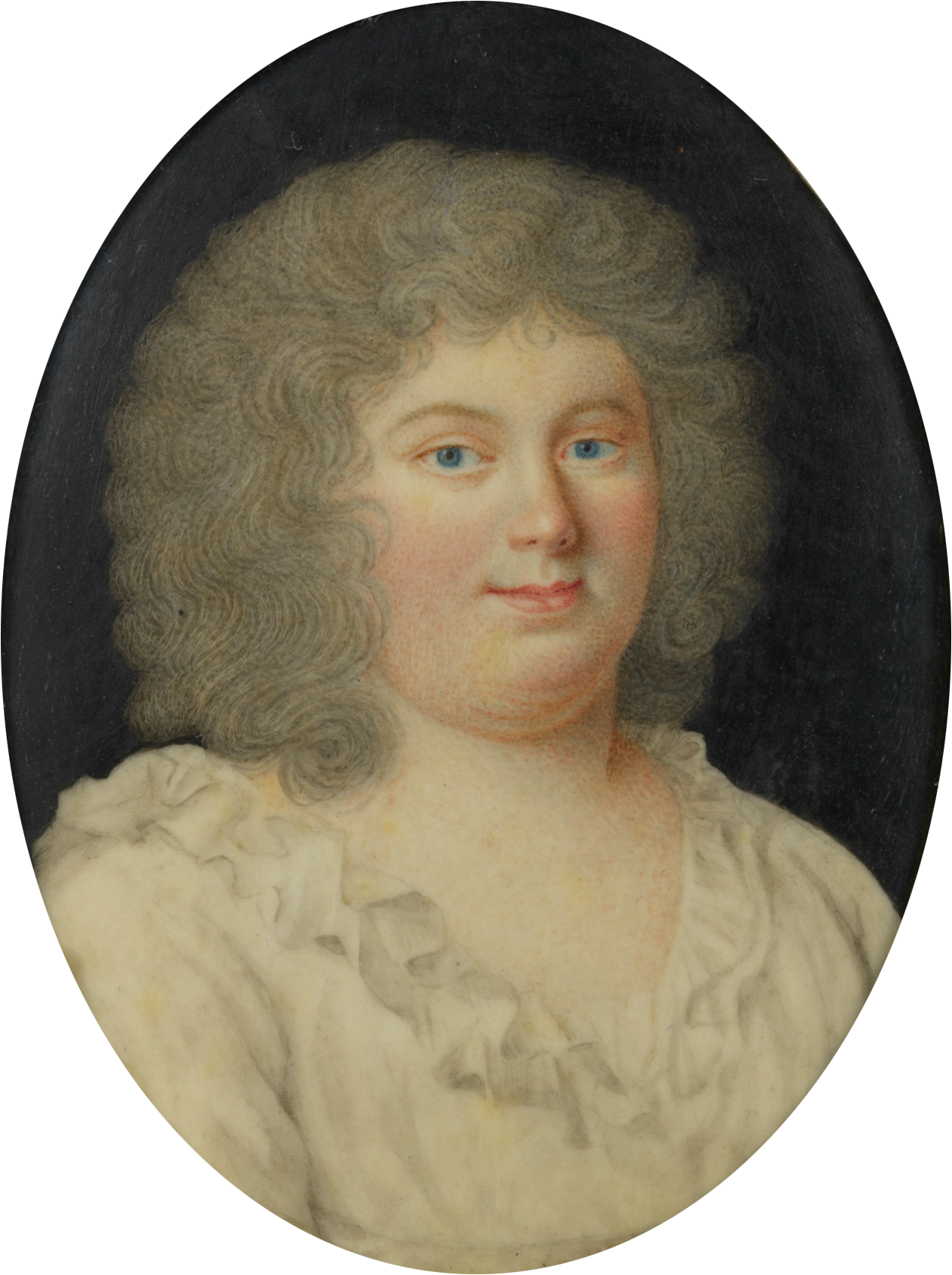
Portrait after Schröder, c. 1790

Frederica Louisa had a good relationship with her son Frederick William III of Prussia, who had resented his mother being put aside by his father and made a point of placing her in a high position of honour and respect. She was described as living a quiet and peaceful life, enjoying the harmony of her son's family life and the presence of her grandchildren.

Frederica Louisa has been described as eccentric, especially during her widowhood. It was claimed that she saw ghosts and apparitions, and for this reason she kept reversed hours, sleeping by day and waking by night.

Ever since 1788, she had spent her summers in Bad Freienwalde, where she was often visited by her children and grandchildren, and where she often spent time during her seven year widowhood. This greatly contributed to the economic and cultural development of the city. Especially as a queen dowager, several buildings were constructed in the city to house her and her court during their stays. In 1799, a summer palace was built for her there by David Gilly.

The Swedish Princess Hedwig Elizabeth Charlotte described her at the time of her visit in 1798:

The Queen Dowager had invited us at déjeuner, and we left for Montbijou, a very simple manor slightly outside of Berlin, where she resides all year. It is sweet and well tendered but terribly small. She had it built herself, as well as the park and the garden. She is a small, very fat, middle aged lady, who walks so crooked that she looks like an old woman. You could mistake her for one of these fairies from an ancient tale. She is very polite and talkative and shines of a goodness which gives the witness of a kind heart and a noble character.

Dowager queen Frederica Louisa died in Berlin on 25 February 1805, having suffered a stroke.

== Archives ==
Frederica Louisa's letters to her mother, Countess Palatine Caroline of Zweibrücken, written between 1765 and 1773, are preserved in the Hessian State Archive (Hessisches Staatsarchiv Darmstadt) in Darmstadt, Germany. Frederica Louisa's letters to her father, Louis IX, Landgrave of Hesse-Darmstadt, as well as other persons, written between 1770 and 1805, are also preserved in the Hessian State Archive (Hessisches Staatsarchiv Darmstadt) in Darmstadt, Germany.

== Issue ==
Frederick William and Frederica Louisa had six surviving children:

- Frederick William III of Prussia (1770–1840); married Louise of Mecklenburg-Strelitz and had issue.
- Princess Christine of Prussia (1772–1773)
- Prince Louis Charles of Prussia (1773–1796); married Princess Frederica of Mecklenburg-Strelitz and had issue.
- Princess Wilhelmina of Prussia (1774–1837); married William I of the Netherlands and had issue.
- Stillborn son (born and died 1777)
- Princess Augusta of Prussia (1780–1841); married William II, Elector of Hesse and had issue.
- Prince Henry of Prussia (1781–1846)
- Prince Wilhelm of Prussia (1783–1851); married Princess Marie Anna of Hesse-Homburg and had issue.

== Ancestry ==
Ancestors of Frederica Louisa of Hesse-Darmstadt

8. Ernest Louis, Landgrave of Hesse-Darmstadt
4. Louis VIII, Landgrave of Hesse-Darmstadt
9. Princess Dorothea Charlotte of Brandenburg-Ansbach
2. Louis IX, Landgrave of Hesse-Darmstadt
10. Johann Reinhard III, Count of Hanau-Lichtenberg
5. Countess Charlotte of Hanau-Lichtenberg
11. Princess Dorothea Friederike of Brandenburg-Ansbach
1. Frederica Louisa of Hesse-Darmstadt
12. Christian II, Count Palatine of Zweibrücken-Birkenfeld
6. Christian III, Count Palatine of Zweibrücken
13. Countess Katharina Agathe of Rappoltstein
3. Countess Palatine Caroline of Zweibrücken
14. Louis Crato, Count of Nassau-Saarbrücken
7. Countess Caroline of Nassau-Saarbrücken
15. Countess Philippine Henriette of Hohenlohe-Langenburg

Frederica Louisa of Hesse-Darmstadt House of Hesse-Darmstadt Born: 16 October 1751 Died: 25 February 1805
German royalty
Preceded by Elisabeth Christine of Brunswick-Bevern	Queen consort of Prussia; 17 August 1786 – 16 November 1797	Succeeded by Louise of Mecklenburg-Strelitz
