= Prince Henry of Prussia (1781–1846) =

Prussian prince and army officer

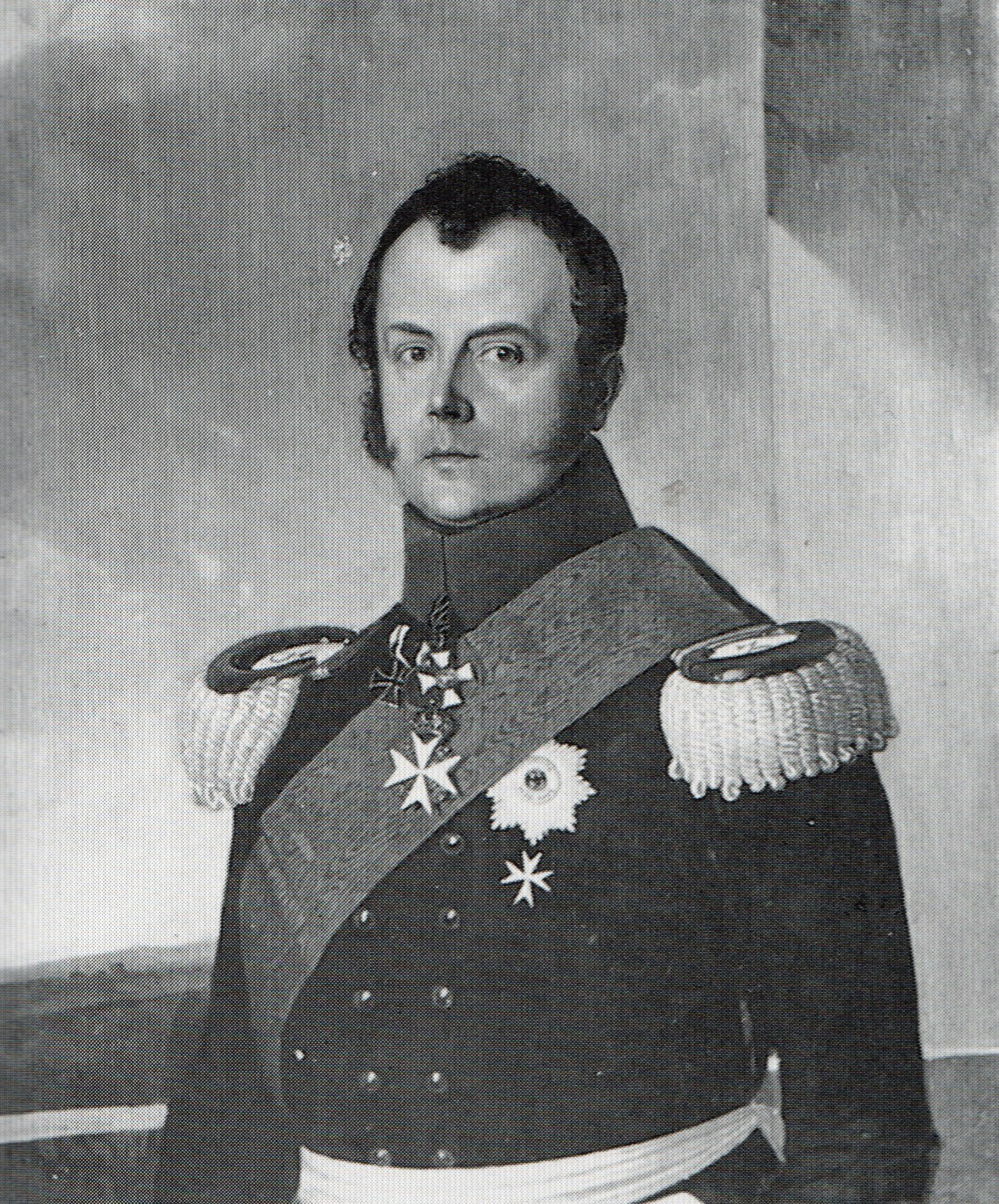
- Portrait, c. 1820
- Born: 30 December 1781; Berlin, Prussia
- Died: 12 July 1846 (aged 64); Rome, Papal States
Names
- German: Friedrich Heinrich Karl; English: Frederick Henry Charles
- House: Hohenzollern
- Father: Frederick William II of Prussia
- Mother: Frederika Louisa of Hesse-Darmstadt

Prince Frederick Henry Charles of Prussia (German: Friedrich Heinrich Karl; 30 December 1781, Berlin - 12 July 1846, Rome) was a Prussian prince and army officer.

== Life ==
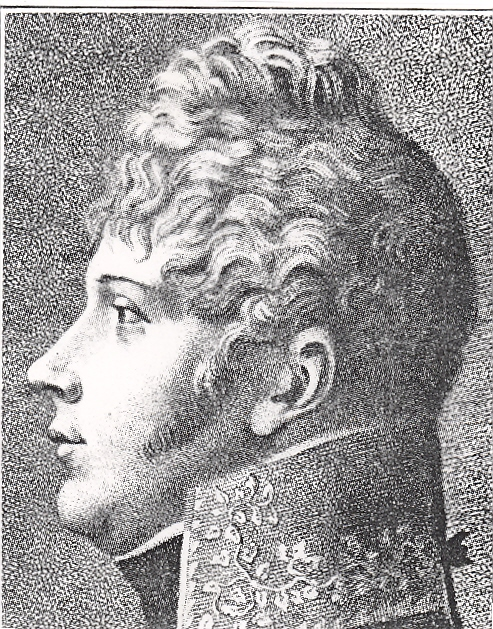
Prince Henry of Prussia

Henry was a son of Frederick William II of Prussia (1744-1797) by his second wife Frederika Louisa (1751-1805), daughter of Louis IX, Landgrave of Hesse-Darmstadt. Henry entered the army on 5 September 1795 as a fähnrich in the Life Company of the 1st Guards Battalion. He also served as an oberst during the 1806-07 campaign against Napoleon - at Auerstadt he was loaned a horse by Gerhard von Scharnhorst after Henry's horse was killed under him. In 1807 he was made commander of the "von Schöning" Infantry Regiment. In the 1813 campaign he was on the headquarters staff of the Russian general Peter Wittgenstein. On 31 May 1815 he was promoted to General of Infantry.

From 1800 until the dissolution of the Bailiwick of Brandenburg in 1811, Henry served as co-adjutor of Prince Augustus Ferdinand of Prussia, the Bailiwick's last Lord Master. On its dissolution, Henry's brother Frederick William III of Prussia set up the Royal Prussian Order of Saint John with Augustus as its Grand Master. In 1813 Henry replaced Augustus as Grand Master. Under Henry the new Order set up a hospital in Jüterbog and a 'Deaconess Institute' (Diakonissenanstalt) in Bucharest. He was also a knight of the Order of the Black Eagle, the Iron Cross, the Order of St. Andrew, the Order of St. Alexander Nevsky and the Order of St. George 3rd degree and Knight Grand Cross of the Order of St. Vladimir.

On 12 August 1817 Henry visited the USS Washington during her time as the US flagship in the Mediterranean. In 1819 he was one of the godparents of Prince George of Cumberland, grandson of George III of the United Kingdom at his christening in Berlin. Later in 1819 Henry moved to Rome, only gaining permission to go from Frederick William III after Henry (always in poor health) fainted at a soirée. He spent his last twenty years bedridden, with major general Friedrich Wilhelm von Lepel (1774-1840) and from 1845 Helmuth von Moltke as his adjutant.

He is buried in the Berliner Dom. Heinrichplatz in Berlin-Kreuzberg was named after him from 7 April 1849 until 21 August 2022 when it was renamed Rio-Reiser-Platz.

== Ancestry ==
Ancestors of Prince Henry of Prussia (1781–1846)

8. Frederick William I of Prussia
4. Prince Augustus William of Prussia
9. Princess Sophia Dorothea of Hanover
2. Frederick William II of Prussia
10. Ferdinand Albert II, Duke of Brunswick-Wolfenbüttel
5. Duchess Luise of Brunswick-Wolfenbüttel
11. Princess Antoinette of Brunswick-Wolfenbüttel
1. Prince Henry of Prussia (1781–1846)
12. Louis VIII, Landgrave of Hesse-Darmstadt
6. Louis IX, Landgrave of Hesse-Darmstadt
13. Countess Charlotte of Hanau-Lichtenberg
3. Princess Frederica Louisa of Hesse-Darmstadt
14. Christian III, Count Palatine of Zweibrücken
7. Countess Palatine Caroline of Zweibrücken
15. Countess Caroline of Nassau-Saarbrücken

== Sources ==
- Richard von Meerheimb: Heinrich Friedrich Karl, Prinz von Preußen. In: Allgemeine Deutsche Biographie (ADB). Band 11, Duncker & Humblot, Leipzig 1880, S. 569 f.
- Heinrich Haeser: Geschichte christlicher Kranken-Pflege und Pflegerschaften. W. Hertz, 1857, S. 55 f.
- Leopold von Zedlitz: Der preussische Staat in allen seinen Beziehungen. August Hirschwald, 1835, S. 149
- Theodor Fontane: Wanderungen durch die Mark Brandenburg, Band 1 (Grafschaft Ruppin) „Ruppiner Garnison“ – Das Regiment Prinz Ferdinand (bei Auerstedt)
- Kurt von Priesdorff: Soldatisches Führertum, Band 3, Hanseatische Verlagsanstalt Hamburg, S. 265-266
