= Gustav Adolf Wilhelm von Ingenheim =

German noble and art collector (1789–1855)

- Count von Ingenheim
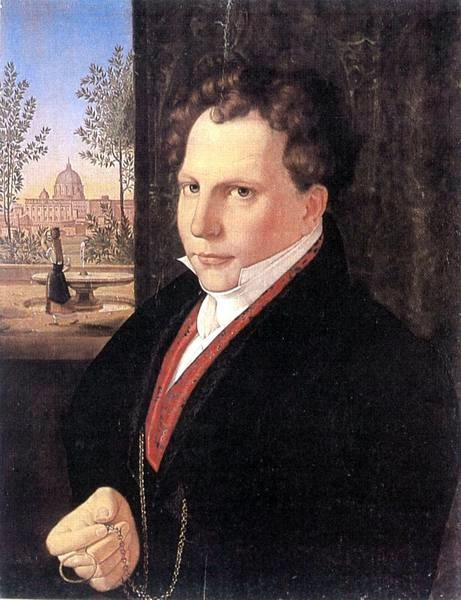
- Portrait by Johann Erdmann Hummel, c. 1840
- Born: 2 January 1789; Berlin, Prussia
- Died: 4 September 1855 (aged 66); Wiesbaden, Nassau
- Spouse: Eugenie de Thierry (m. 1826)
- Issue: 4 children
- Father: Frederick William II of Prussia
- Mother: Julie von Voss

Gustav Adolf Wilhelm Graf von Ingenheim (2 January 1789, Berlin – 4 September 1855, Wiesbaden) was a German art collector.

== Biography ==
He was the son of King Friedrich Wilhelm II of Prussia and his morganatic wife, Julie von Voss, who had been given the title "Countess von Ingenheim". She died of consumption two months after he was born. Upon turning twenty-one, he became a Royal Chamberlain. Following the German campaign of 1813, he was awarded the Iron Cross. Three years later, he was named a Privy Councilor, in service to his half-brother, King Friedrich Wilhelm III.

It was at then that he decided to devote his life to his true passion, art, and began acquiring a collection. In pursuit of that goal, he lived in Italy from 1816 to 1818, and again from 1822, purchasing works for the newly established museums in Berlin, as well as for himself. He also hosted a salon that alternated between Rome and Berlin, while cultivating contacts with well known contemporary artists, such as Johann Erdmann Hummel, Aloys Hirt, Christian Daniel Rauch and Karl Friedrich Schinkel. In addition, he supported Moritz Daniel Oppenheim and Franz Ludwig Catel with his own commissions and secured funds for the archaeological research being conducted by Eduard Gerhard.

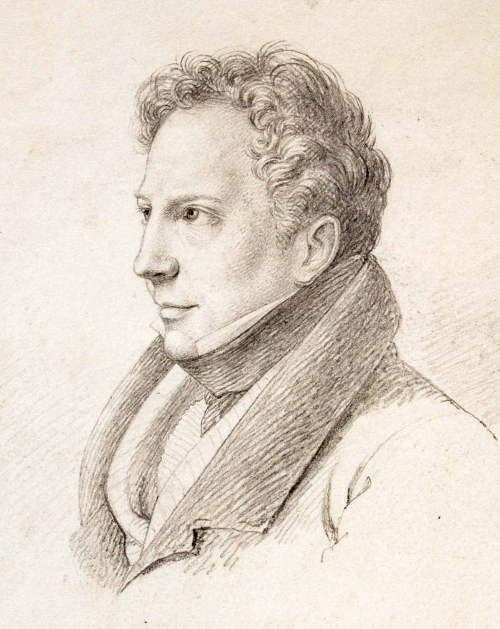
Drawing of Count von Ingenheim, c. 1825

In 1825, his half-sister, Countess Julie von Brandenburg, and her husband, Frederick Ferdinand, Duke of Anhalt-Köthen, converted to Catholicism. A year later, he followed suit and married Eugénie de Thierry (1808–1881), a distant relative. They had four children Julius Ferdinand Maria Laurentius (* 10 August 1827; † 28th Match 1903) married Elisabeth zu Stolberg-Stolberg Eugen (* 16 July 1837; † 16tj July 1897) Marianna Camilla Romana, (* 17 July 1831; † 11 July 1915) married Heinrich Maria von Stillfried-Rattonitz and Franz (* 13 April 1846; † 6 June 1919) married Huberta von Francken-Sierstorpff. Franz descendants remain the only Counts of Ingenheim. Eugénie de Thierry was the granddaughter of Wilhelmine, Gräfin von Lichtenau. As a result, the King banned him from Berlin, cutting off the funds that were necessary to continue his collecting. He remained in Rome until 1833.

Some of the works he had already acquired were sold to museums. The remainder were kept at the Villa Ingenheim in Potsdam. In 1883, the collection was transferred to Castle Reisewitz, which had been purchased by his widow. The castle was looted in 1945, and the collection was scattered. Few of the works have been accounted for.
