= Elisabeth Helene von Vieregg =

Danish noble and lady-in-waiting of German origin

Elisabet Helene von Vieregg
- Countess of Antvorskov
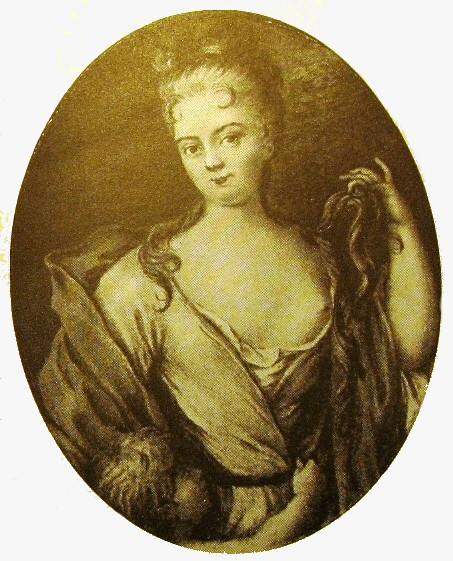
- Portrait of Elisabeth Helene
- Known for: Bigamy with Frederick IV of Denmark
- Born: 4 May 1679
- Died: 27 June 1704 (aged 25); Denmark
- Noble family: Vieregg
- Spouse: Frederick IV of Denmark (by bigamy)
- Issue: Frederik Gyldenløve (1704-1705)
- Parents: Adam Otto von Vieregg; Anna Helena von Wolfersdorf
- Occupation: Lady in waiting, royal mistress

Elisabeth Helene von Vieregg (4 May 1679 – 27 June 1704), Countess of Antvorskov, was Danish noble and lady-in-waiting of German origin. She was the royal mistress of King Frederick IV of Denmark and, later, his first morganatic wife by bigamy.

== Early life ==
Born into an ancient German noble family from Mecklenburg, she was the daughter of Prussian minister Adam Otto von Vieregg (1634-1717), who later served as the Prussian ambassador in Copenhagen from 1698 to 1706, and his second wife, Anna Helena von Wolfersdorf (1651–1701).

== Career ==
Elisabeth Helene was made lady-in-waiting to Princess Sophia Hedwig of Denmark, and entered into a relationship with Frederick, who became King the same year (1699).

The relationship was initially a secret, but was discovered in 1701 after a letter from her father, defending their relationship, was made public. On 6 September 1703 she was secretly married to Frederick IV, who thereby committed bigamy (his queen consort, Louise of Mecklenburg-Güstrow, was still alive), and was given the estate Antvorskov and the title Countess of Antvorskov. The church authorities had not forbidden the king to engage in polygamy, as there were doctrines based on biblical era polygamy of Hebrew patriarchs.

She gave birth to a son, Frederik Gyldenløve (8 June 1704 – 9 March 1705), and died in childbirth. Frederick IV gave her an elaborate public funeral. After her death she was replaced as royal mistress by Charlotte Helene von Schindel, her lady-in-waiting.

== See also ==
- Margarethe von der Saale
- Julie von Voß
- Sophie von Dönhoff

== Sources ==
- Dansk biografisk leksikon
