= Johann Christoph von Wöllner =

Prussian pastor and politician

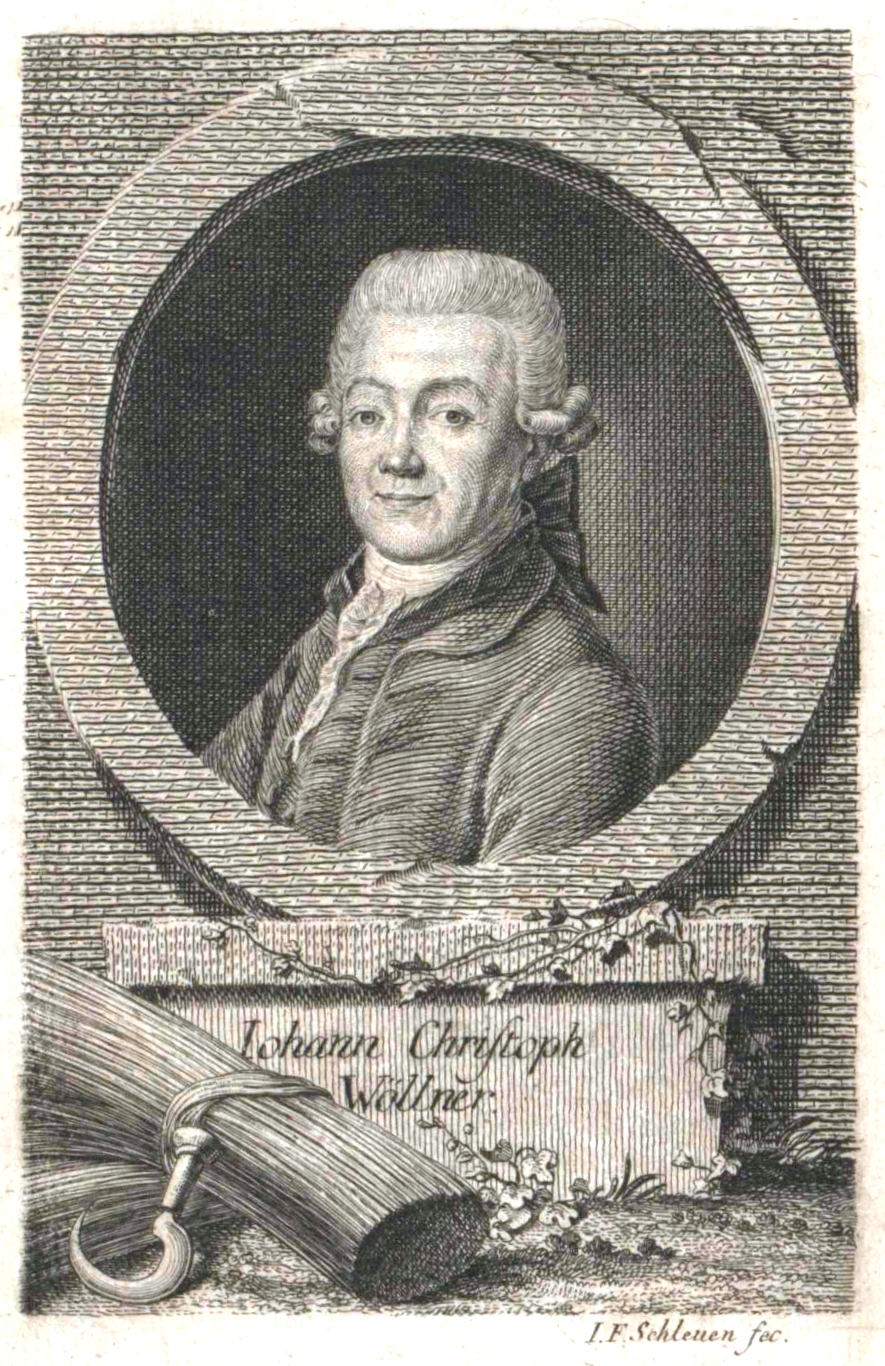
Johann Christoph von Wöllner

Johann Christoph von Wöllner (19 May 1732 in Döberitz, Margraviate of Brandenburg – 10 September 1800 in Grossriez near Beeskow) was a Prussian pastor and politician under King Frederick William II. He was inclined to mysticism and joined the Freemasons and the Order of the Golden and Rosy Cross.

== Biography ==
Wöllner was born in 1732 in Döberitz. His father was a pastor.

Wöllner, whom Frederick the Great had described as a "treacherous and intriguing priest," had started life as a poor tutor in the family of General August Frederick von Itzenplitz, a noble of the Margraviate of Brandenburg. After the general's death and to the scandal of king and nobility, he married the general's daughter, and with his mother-in-law's assistance settled down on a small estate. By his practical experiments and writings he gained a considerable reputation as an economist; but his ambition was not content with this, and he sought to extend his influence by joining first the Freemasons and afterwards the Rosicrucians. Wöllner, with his impressive personality and easy if superficial eloquence, was just the man to lead a movement of this kind. Under his influence the order spread rapidly, and he soon found himself the supreme director (Oberhauptdirektor) of several circles, which included in their membership princes, officers and high officials. As a Rosicrucian Wöllner dabbled in alchemy and other mystic arts, but he was also zealous for Christian orthodoxy as well as the Enlightenment concept of religion as an important factor in maintaining public order. A few months before Frederick II's death, Wöllner wrote to his friend the Rosicrucian Johann Rudolph von Bischoffswerder (1741–1803) that his highest ambition was to be placed at the head of the religious department of the state as an unworthy instrument in the hand of Ormesus (the prince of Prussia's Rosicrucian name) "for the purpose of saving millions of souls from perdition and bringing back the whole country to the faith of Jesus Christ."

Despite this statement, king Frederick William II of Prussia, with Christoph von Wöllner as Minister of Justice and head of the Office for the Worship, instituted the Königliche Examinations-Commission in geistlichen Sachen with the declared public purpose of managing and controlling any religious or spiritual activity in all the nation, and of applying the relative decree of 9 July 1788. The commission had also the legal power of confiscation on money and properties.

Among the most famous victims of this censorship, Immanuel Kant, with his 1793 first published script, titled Religion within the Bounds of Bare Reason. The theologian Karl Friedrich Bahrdt saw himself forced to lay down his magisterium because of the new regulations.

== Bibliography ==
- Uta Wiggermann: Woellner und das Religionsedikt, Tübingen: Mohr Siebeck, 2010.
- Dirk Kemper: Obskurantismus als Mittel der Politik. Johann Christoph von Wöllners Politik der Gegenaufklärung am Vorabend der Französischen Revolution, in: Von „Obscuranten“ und „Eudämonisten“. Gegenaufklärerische, konservative und antirevolutionäre Publizisten im späten 18. Jahrhundert, ed. by Christoph Weiß, St. Ingbert 1997, pp. 193–220.
- Reinhard Markner: Woellner, Johann Christoph (1732–1800), in: Le Monde maçonnique au XVIIIe siècle, ed. by Charles Porset (†) and Cécile Révauger, Paris 2013, vol. 3, pp. 2820–2824. (German version)
