= Franz Ignaz von Holbein =

Austrian playwright and theatre director (1779–1855)

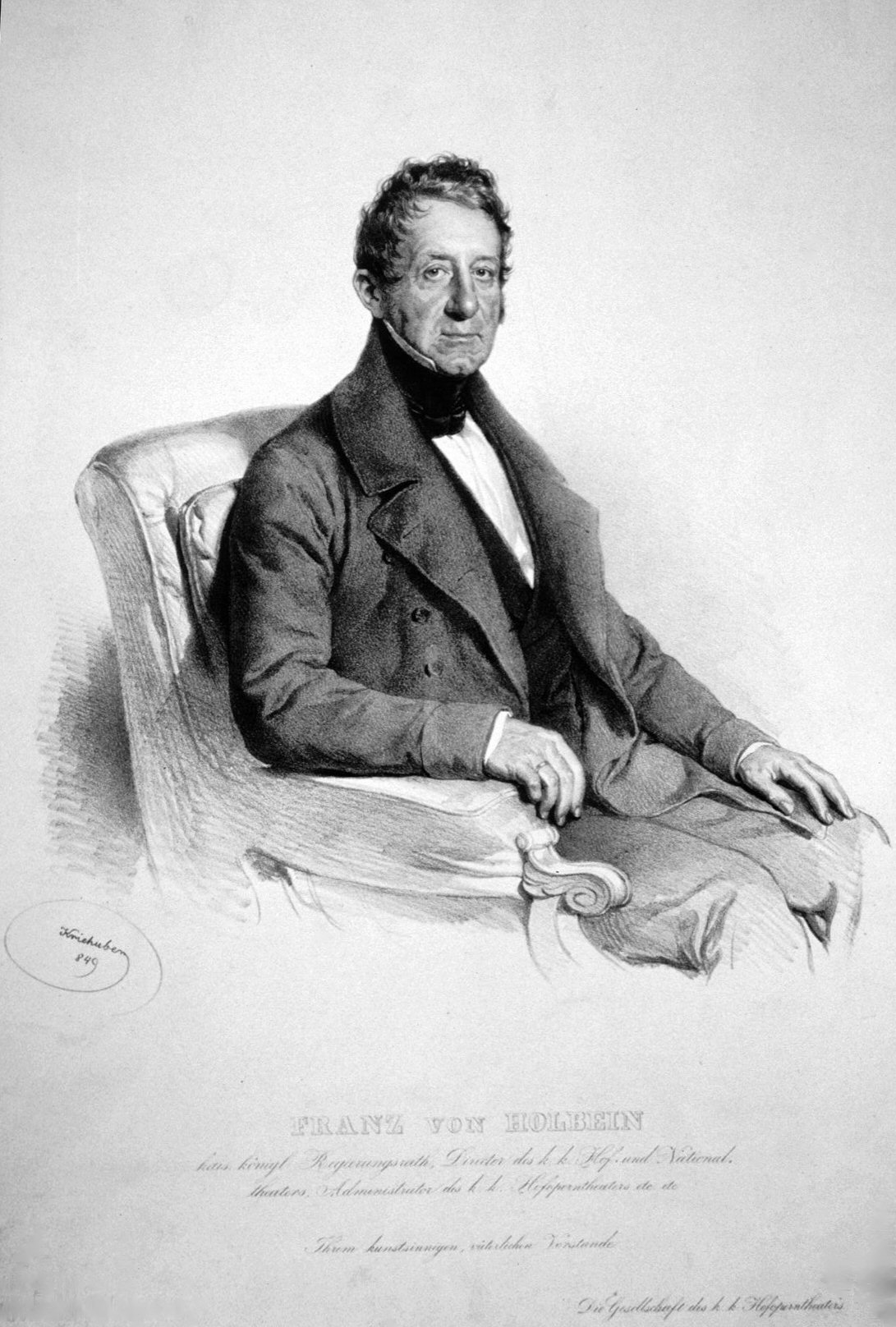
Lithograph of Holbein by Josef Kriehuber, 1849

Franz Ignaz von Holbein (27 August 1779 – 5 September 1855) was an Austrian playwright and theatre director.

== Life ==
Born in Zistersdorf, Holbein (Edler von Holbeinsberg) was supposed to devote himself to civil service, but followed his adventurous spirit and, earning his living by singing and playing the guitar, went around the world under the name "Fontano".

In Fraustadt, he accepted engagements with Döbbelin's theatre company, later with the Hoftheater, became husband of Gräfin Lichtenau and took up residence in Breslau, where he composed among other things the play Fridolin after Schiller's Der Gang nach dem Eisenhammer.

After he had divorced after five years of marriage, he again wandered around with a guitar he had improved, until Count Ferdinánd Pálffy appointed him as a theatre poet at the Theater an der Wien, where he also became court theatre director with a salary of 1000 gulden in August 1808. He also gave guest performances in Regensburg, Stuttgart and Nuremberg, where he received a letter from the Bamberg doctor Adalbert Friedrich Marcus, asking him to give a guest performance in Bamberg and take over the directorship of the theatre there. The Bamberg guest performance took place from April 1 to 24, 1810, and in the autumn, Holbein actually took over the management of the theatre there and gave E. T. A. Hoffmann the post of music director. In the beginning, his ensemble also included the opera singer Elisabeth Röckel. In Bamberg, he wrote his well-received Turnier zu Kronstein and after he had directed the Würzburg theatre from 1812 until 1813, he went to Hanover in 1816 as a director. From there, he moved to Prague in 1819 as a director and in 1824 again to the court theatre of Hanover, where he stayed for 16 years.

In 1841, he was appointed to the Hofburgtheater in the same position in Vienna, where he stayed until the end of 1849, at which time Heinrich Laube joined; in 1853, he also gave up the direction of the Hofoperntheater.

== Family ==
Holbein was married three times. In 1802, he married Gräfin Lichtenau in Breslau, from whom he separated again in 1806. In 1820, he married the actress Marie Johanna Renner (1775–1824) in Prague in his second marriage. With her he had the daughter Marie von Holbein, who also became an actress. He married his third wife in 1827: Johanna Göhring, who became known as Johanna von Holbein under the name of her husband. From this marriage, three sons were born, all three of them serving as officers in the k. k. Austrian army, among them Franz von Holbein-Holbeinsberg.

== Work ==
Holbein wrote a large number of plays which achieved temporary success by practical means without any intrinsic value. Collected, they appeared as Deutschen Bühnenwesens (Vienna 1853).* Theater (Rudolstadt 1811, 2 vols.),

- Neuestes Theater (Pest 1822–1823) and
- Dilettantenbühne (Vienna 1826).

The story of his life and aspirations is contained in the first and only part of his Deutsches Bühnenwesen (Vienna 1853).
