= Friedrich Wilhelm von Lepel =

Friedrich Wilhelm Graf von Lepel (25 April 1774, Fürstenwalde/Spree - 9 January 1840, Rome) was a Prussian major general. His parents came from the von Lepel family, a noble family from Pommerania. He had four siblings - Dietrich (1767–1815), Catharina (1769–1833), Wilhelmine (1781–1795) and Adolph (1783–1847). He served as adjutant to Prince Henry of Prussia (1781-1846), younger brother of Frederick William III of Prussia.

== Life ==
Wilhelm began his military career in 1787 as a Gefreiter-Korporal in the 1st von Legat Fusilier Battalion (Number 20). In 1810 he married Charlotte Isabella Ulrike von Blumenthal (1778–1828). He served in the War of the First Coalition as a Second Lieutenant then from 1812 as a Major in the Prussian force attached to Napoleon's army for the French invasion of Russia. For commanding four squadrons in the victory before Riga (before the unsuccessful Siege of Riga), Wilhelm was granted the Pour le Mérite on 4 September 1812 and awarded the Cross of the Legion d'Honneur by Napoleon. In 1813 he became Prince Henry of Prussia's aide de campe and with him he fought against Napoleon at the battle of Leipzig. Henry and Wilhelm arrived in Paris together at the end of the campaign and from 1816 until his death Wilhelm served as his adjutant in Rome. In 1833 Wilhelm married the Englishwoman Fanny Agnew (1799–1852) - both his marriages were childless. On 16 March 1838, his fiftieth anniversary of joining up, Frederick William III made Wilhelm a count in the nobility of Prussia.

== Bibliography ==
- Historisch-Genealogisches Handbuch der Familie v. Lepel (Lepell). Auf der Grundlage familiengeschichtlicher Quellen erarbeitet durch Andreas Hansert und Oskar Matthias Frhr. v. Lepel unter Mitarbeit von Klaus Bernhard Frhr. v. Lepel und Herbert Stoyan. Deutsches Familienarchiv, Band 151, Verlag Degener & Co., Inhaber Manfred Dreiss, Insingen 2008, Seite 142–144, ISBN 978-3-7686-5201-8
