= Frederick William II of Prussia =

King of Prussia from 1786 to 1797

Frederick William II
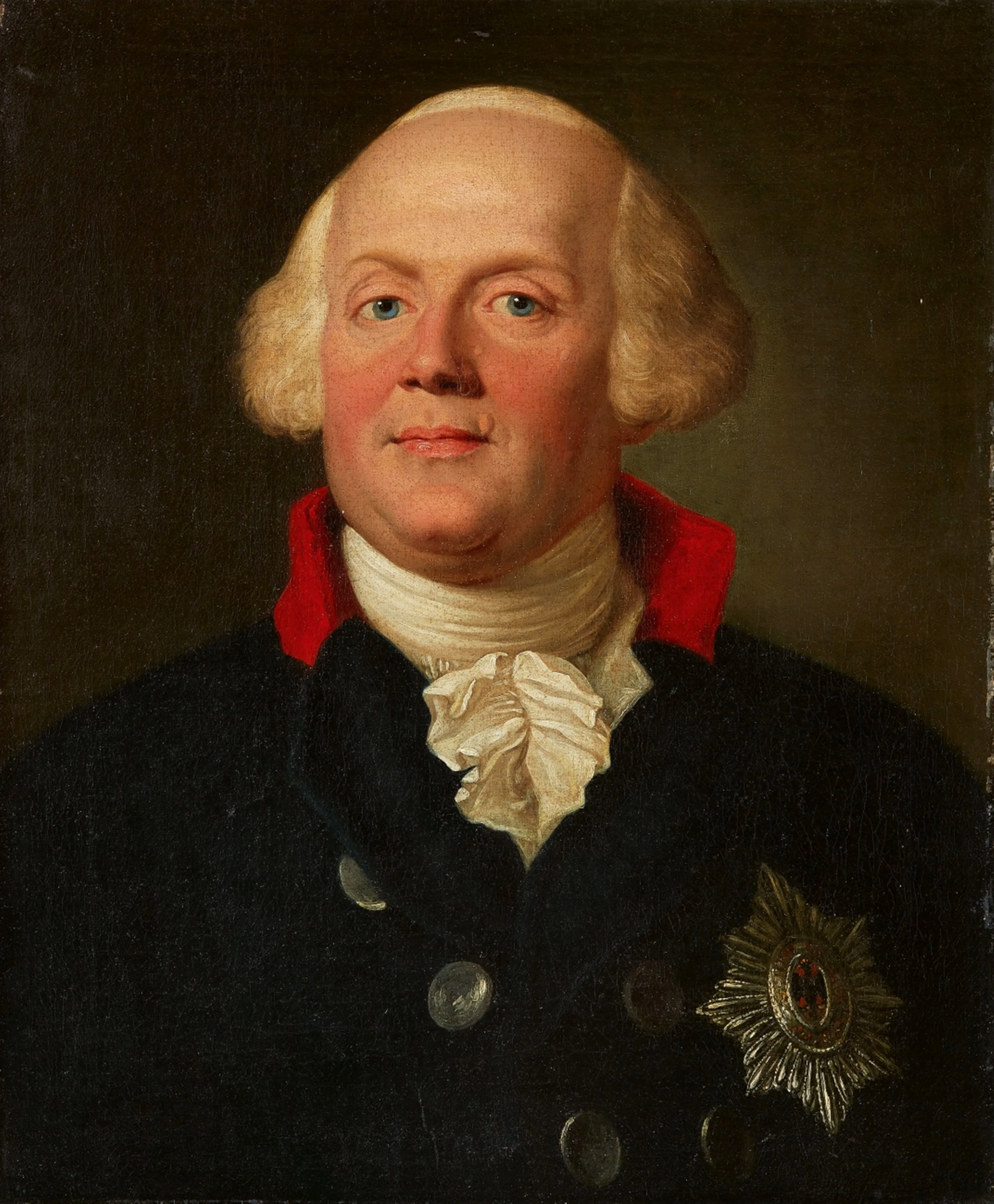
- Portrait by Anton Graff, 18th century

King of Prussia Elector of Brandenburg Prince of Neuchâtel
- Reign: 17 August 1786 – 16 November 1797
- Predecessor: Frederick II
- Successor: Frederick William III
- Born: 25 September 1744; Stadtschloss, Berlin, Kingdom of Prussia, Holy Roman Empire
- Died: 16 November 1797 (aged 53); Marmorpalais, Potsdam, Kingdom of Prussia, Holy Roman Empire
- Burial: Berliner Dom
- Spouses: Elisabeth Christine of Brunswick-Wolfenbüttel (m. 1765; div. 1769) Frederica Louisa of Hesse-Darmstadt (m. 1769) Julie von Voß (m. 1787; died 1789) (morganatic) Sophie von Dönhoff (m. 1790; sep. 1792) (morganatic)
- Issue: Princess Frederica Charlotte, Duchess of York and Albany; Frederick William III; Prince Louis Charles; Wilhelmine, Queen of the Netherlands; Augusta, Electress of Hesse; Prince Henry; Prince Wilhelm; Gustav Adolf Wilhelm von Ingenheim (illegitimate); Friedrich Wilhelm, Count Brandenburg (illegitimate)
- House: Hohenzollern
- Father: Prince Augustus William of Prussia
- Mother: Duchess Luise of Brunswick-Wolfenbüttel
- Religion: Calvinist

Frederick William II (German: Friedrich Wilhelm II.; 25 September 1744 – 16 November 1797) was King of Prussia from 1786 until his death in 1797. He was also Prince-elector of Brandenburg and Prince of Neuchâtel.

As a defensive reaction to the French Revolution, Frederick William II ended the German Dualism between Prussia and Austria. Domestically, he turned away from the enlightened style of government of his predecessor and introduced a tightened system of censorship and religious control. The king was an important patron of the arts especially in the field of music. As a skilled cellist he enjoyed the dedication of various cello-centric compositions by Mozart, Haydn, Boccherini, and Beethoven. He also commissioned some of the most notable architecture in Prussia, including the Brandenburg Gate in Berlin, the Marble Palace, and Orangery in the New Garden, Potsdam.

== Early life ==
Frederick William was born in Berlin on 25 September 1744, the eldest son of the Prussian Prince Augustus William of Prussia (1722–1758) and Duchess Luise of Brunswick-Wolfenbüttel. Initially, Frederick William was second in line to the Prussian throne after his father. His childless predecessor, King Frederick II, had designated his younger brother Augustus William, Frederick William's father, as Prince of Prussia in 1744.

Frederick William was born into a time of war, for Prussia had again been at war (1744–1745) with Austria since 10 August 1744. Since the death of Charles VI, Holy Roman Emperor of the House of Habsburg in 1740, Vienna had been without a male heir to the throne. Although Charles VI had appointed his daughter Maria Theresa as heir with the Pragmatic Sanction of 1713, this document contradicted the previously valid Salic law, which only provided for male heirs to the throne. Frederick II of Prussia took advantage of the Austrian succession crisis to annex Habsburg Silesia. He thus began the first of a total of three Silesian Wars which, with brief interruptions, were to last until 1763.

On 11 October 1744, Frederick William was baptized in the predecessor of today's Berlin Cathedral. In addition to members of the Prussian royal family, Charles VII, Holy Roman Emperor, Tsarina Elisabeth of Russia, Louis XV of France and the Swedish heir to the throne Adolf Frederick were chosen as godparents in keeping with his status. The choice of godparents also demonstrated the king's attempt to isolate Austria in terms of alliance policy. These foreign rulers were not personally present at the baptism, but had themselves represented.

== Education ==
In 1747, King Frederick II removed his three-year-old nephew from the care of his family, who lived in the Berlin Crown Prince's Palace and Oranienburg Palace. He had Frederick William brought to the Berlin Palace and decided on an education in the spirit of the Age of Enlightenment, selecting a tutor for his four-year-old nephew.

Nicolas de Béguelin was selected by the king to fulfill this role. Béguelin had studied law and mathematics, then worked at the Imperial Chamber Court in Wetzlar and had been in Prussian service since 1743. He had already come into personal contact with Frederick II and enjoyed his esteem. Béguelin strictly regulated the daily routine of the four- and five-year-old prince: in the morning, the prince learned German and French, the language of the European courts. At noon, he had to invite cavaliers of the court to be introduced to diplomatic manners. After lunch, the language lessons continued in written form, since he could already read and write at the age of five. Only then did he have time to play. But even at this time of day, he had to act out what he had learned with the help of puppets.

Frederick II constantly intervened in education. At the reception of the cavaliers at noon, for example, he demanded that Frederick William not be brought up to be modest and reserved. As a possible successor to the kingship, he was to gain respect among the country's nobility through "Dreistigkeit" (audacity), in accordance with Frederick II's will. The rather shy Frederick William could not meet these demands of his uncle. The high expectations that were placed on the child's behaviour and willingness to perform on a daily basis left little room for carefree hours and child-friendly activities. If the prince did not feel like performing certain tasks or showed defiance, Béguelin would take away his favourite toy or even threaten to beat him.

Frederick William was taught mathematics, science, medicine, law, philosophy and history. Members of the Royal Prussian Academy of Sciences, which under Frederick II brought together important, predominantly French scholars, repeatedly acted as educational mentors. The future king had a solid knowledge of Greek, Roman, Assyrian and Jewish history in particular. Occasionally Béguelin relaxed the lessons by taking the prince on excursions to Berlin manufactories, workshops and art studios. Dancing, fencing and riding were also on the programme. However, he did not receive an education that would have prepared Frederick William for the affairs of state of a reigning monarch.

In 1751, the king chose the well-read and highly educated Major Heinrich Adrian von Borcke for Frederick William's military training. The 36-year-old count showed little pedagogical sensitivity. Reports that Borcke had to write regularly to Frederick II to report on the child's progress show that Frederick William often behaved rebelliously and was punished for it with beatings. When this did not help either, Borcke forbade the prince to have contact with his younger brother Henry. Frederick II approved of this educational practice. On 19 August 1754, he demanded that Frederick William move from Berlin to Potsdam, to his court. The king stated that the aim was to transform Frederick William's sensitive and reserved nature:

"As he (Frederick William) is somewhat shy, I have told all who come to me to tease him in order to make him speak. I am convinced that he will not be embarrassed in front of anyone in the near future."

- Letter from King Frederick II to his younger brother Augustus William of Prussia

== Prince of Prussia ==
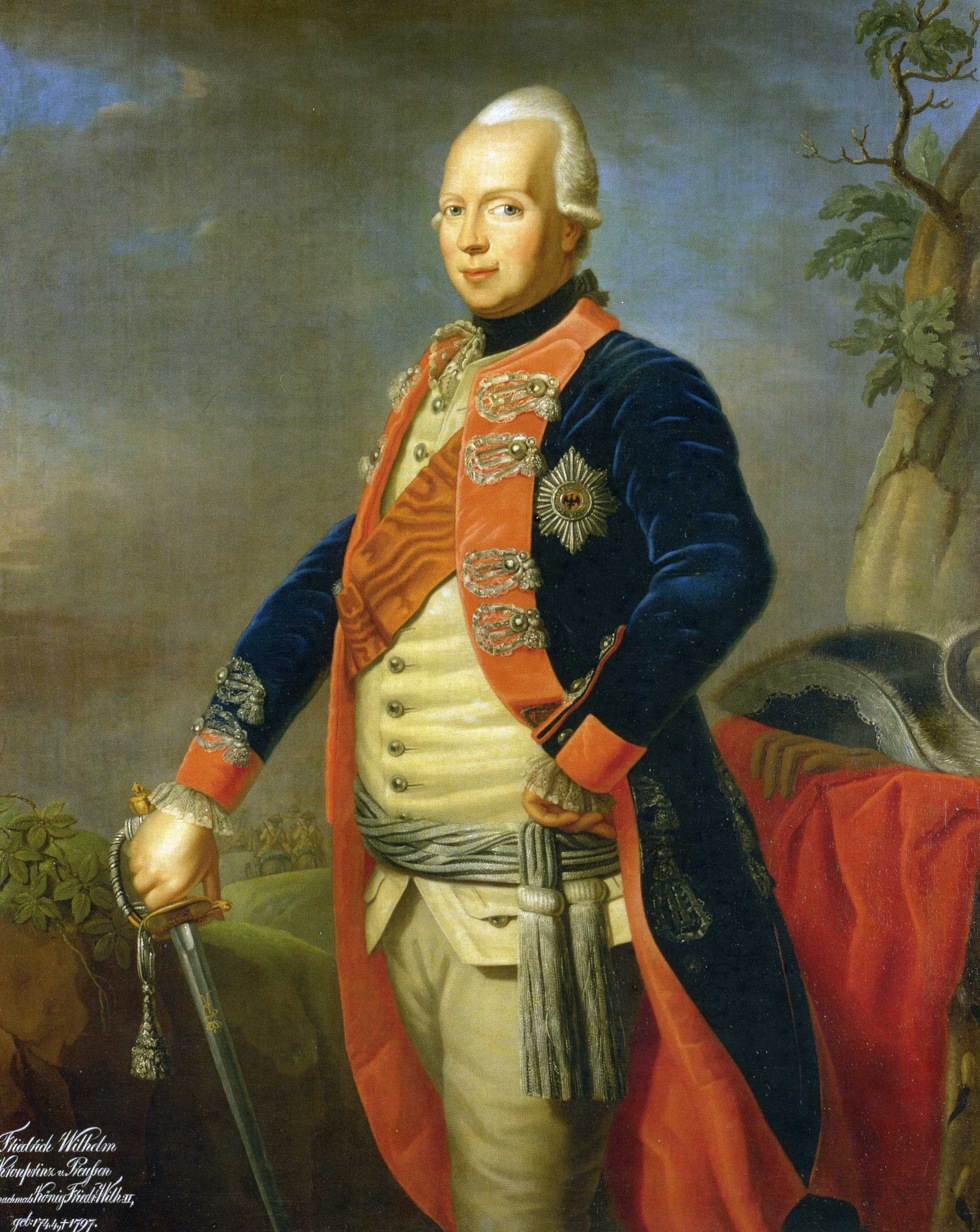
Portrait of Prince Frederick William, c. 1765

Frederick William's youth was overshadowed by the experiences of the Third Silesian War and Seven Years' War (1756–1763).

The war exacerbated tensions between King Frederick II and Frederick William's father, Augustus William, who had been heir presumptive to the throne as Prince of Prussia since 1744. In the autumn of 1757, Frederick II dishonourably dismissed his brother from the Prussian Army over accusations of multiple failures. Some historians suggest that Frederick deliberately used his brother as a scapegoat to distract attention from his own failures as a general, and later transferred his contempt for the younger brother to Frederick William. In fact, Frederick II had treated his nephew no more viciously than those around him before Augustus William's death.

After the death of Frederick William's father, it was not until December 1758 that both Frederick William and his brother Henry were able to visit King Frederick II in his winter camp in Torgau. On this occasion Frederick II confirmed his nephew's position as heir presumptive to the throne and on 13 December 1758 bestowed on him the title and name Prince of Prussia. In this way Frederick II signalled to the outside world that Prussia's existence was secure through his nephew. In fact, however, Prussia faced complete dissolution several times during this war. The Prussian court was often on the run or had to entrench itself in the fortress of Magdeburg.

In the final stages of the Seven Years' War, Frederick II viewed the popularity of the heir to the throne with the soldiers with concern, as it threatened to overshadow his own military fame. In 1762, the Prince of Prussia took part in the Siege of Schweidnitz and the Battle of Burkersdorf. Although Frederick II praised him for his bravery and appointed him commander of a Potsdam infantry regiment, over time the relationship between the monarch and his heir to the throne cooled noticeably.

The Seven Years' War finally ended with the Treaty of Hubertusburg on 15 February 1763. Prussia had been able to assert itself as a great power and defend Silesia, but had accepted immense economic and cultural damage in return. Plagues, hunger and disease caused the loss of over 300,000 civilians in Prussia alone.

=== Conflict with Frederick II ===
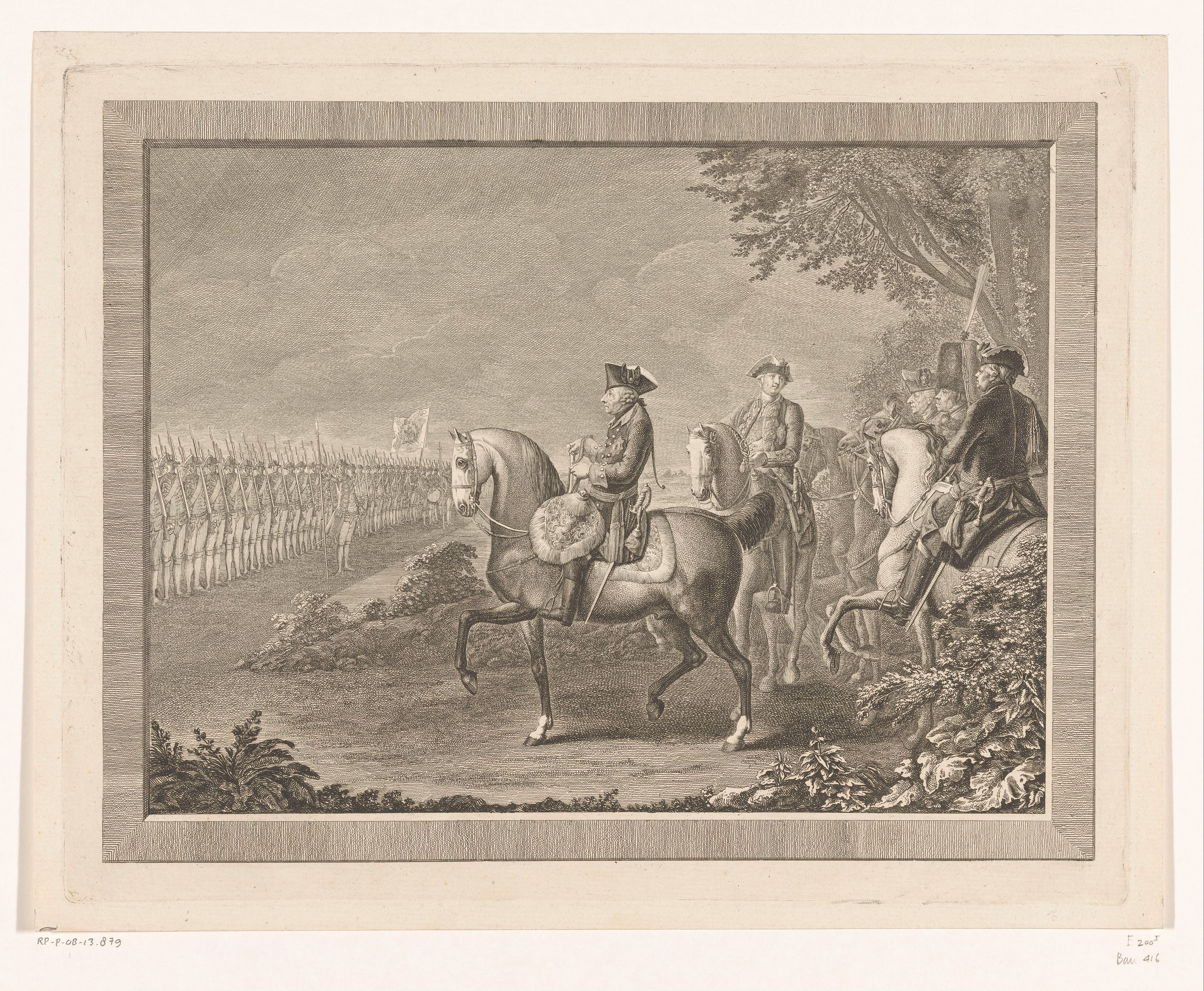
Frederick II and Frederick William II

Frederick II aimed at publicly humiliating his heir presumptive to the throne. He expressed his regret that his other nephew, Charles William Ferdinand, Duke of Brunswick, could not succeed him on the throne. The art historian Alfred Hagemann interprets this behaviour as meaning that Frederick wanted to enhance his own image in history by deliberately dismantling his own successor.

At the latest, the two forced marriages to Elisabeth Christine of Brunswick-Wolfenbüttel, and then Frederica Louisa of Hesse-Darmstadt, arranged by Frederick II led to the tense relationship between king and crown prince. Frederick William began to distance himself more and more from Frederick II in terms of character: While King Frederick II lived in a purely male world, the crown prince built up an emotional and bourgeois love life with his mistress Wilhelmine Encke from the 1760s onwards. While Frederick II was critical of religious practice, Frederick William II was a devout Protestant. While Frederick II was only a patron of French culture, Frederick William II as king supported German music and theatre. While Frederick II withdrew into small elite circles, Frederick William II as king sought representative appearances. Frederick William was a man of his time, interested in spiritualism, clairvoyance and astrology, which would have repelled his predecessor.

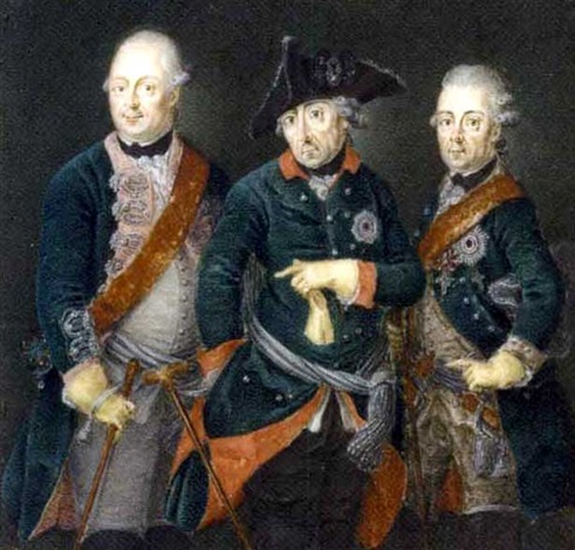
Portrait of Frederick William II (left) with his uncles Frederick the Great (center) and Prince Henry (right), by Anton Friedrich König

Frederick II's contempt for his successor is also evidenced by the Potsdam apartment assigned to the "Prince of Prussia" on the corner of Neuer Markt. Given his high position, he lived there very cramped amidst the burghers. The building on Neuer Markt, known today as the "Kabinettshaus", had originally been erected in 1753 for the country preacher Krumbholz and had to be makeshiftly converted into the Crown Prince's Palace in 1764. In the rented neighbouring house at Schwertfegerstrasse 8, the future Prussian King Frederick William III was born on 3 August 1770. In the house, the crown prince invited Potsdam's distinguished society to concerts and balls, which, however, were soon moved to the old orangery at the Lustgarten due to lack of space.

Frederick's lifestyle and conception of the state differed fundamentally from those of his nephew. Frederick lived according to the principle that the ruler should be the "first servant" of the state. To this end, he devoted himself in depth to politics, government work and state philosophy, sometimes attending to the smallest details. He often changed his advisors and officials and was reluctant to delegate tasks and power to others. He ruled as an autocrat until the end.

Although Frederick II gave his nephew an educational upbringing, the king failed - likely through malice - to introduce the heir presumptive to the throne to political processes and contexts. He was only allowed to attend the sessions of the Berlin Court of Appeal. Frederick II, however, forbade his ministers to grant Frederick William insights into day-to-day political business. Due to his upbringing, he possessed solid knowledge only in constitutional law, military matters and the arts.

=== Contemporary account of Frederick William by John Moore ===
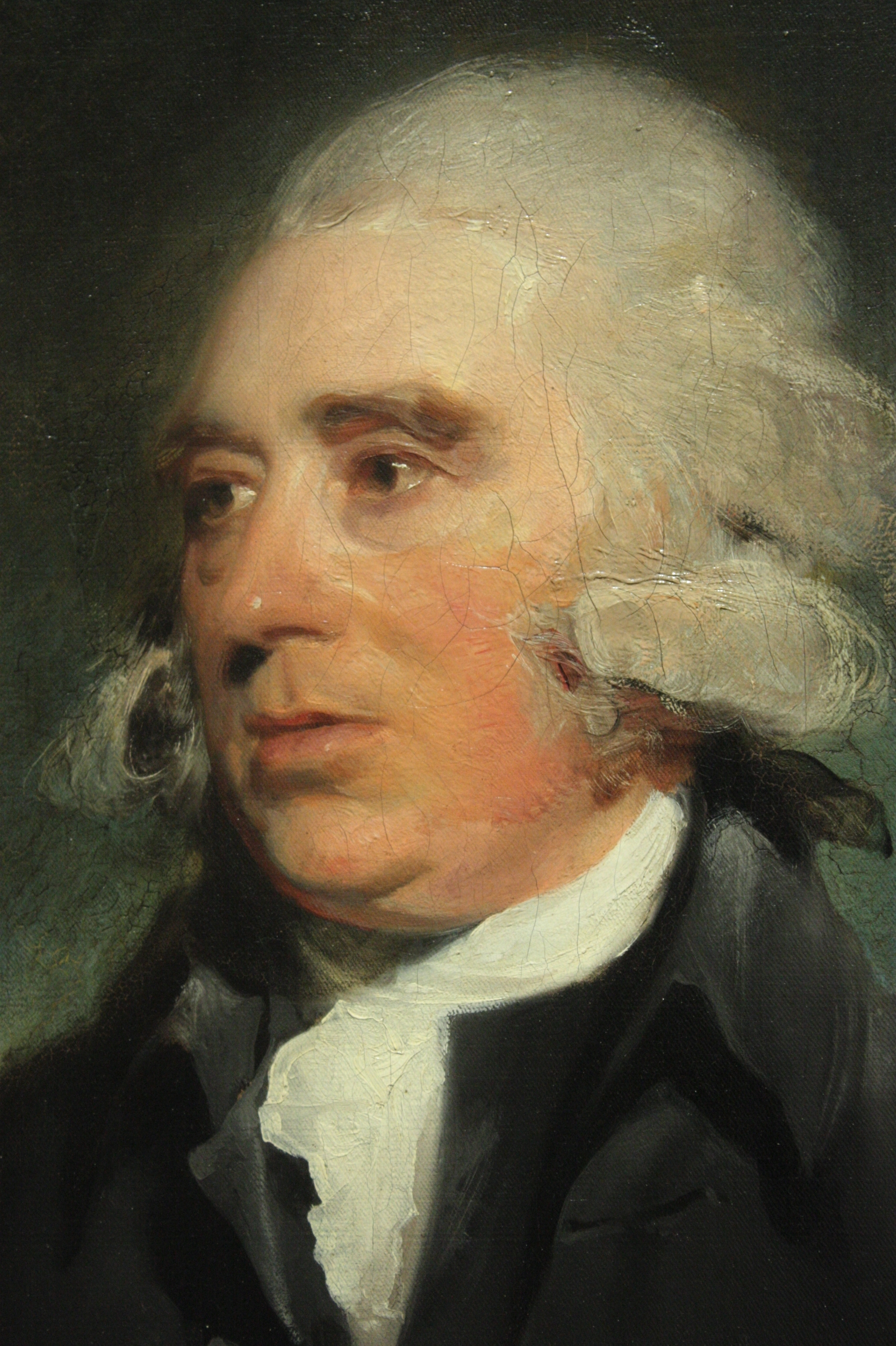
John Moore

"The hereditary Prince of Prussia lives in a small house in the town of Potsdam. His appointments do not admit of that degree of magnificence, which might be expected in the Heir of the Crown, but he displays a spirit of hospitality far more obliging than magnificence; and doubly meritorious, considering the very moderate revenue allowed him. We generally sup there two or three times a week.

"This Prince is not often at the King's parties, nor is it imagined that he enjoys a great share of his uncle's favor. In what degree he possesses the talents of a general is not known, as he was too young to have any command during the late war. But he certainly has a very just understanding, which has been improved by study. He has taken some pains to acquire the English language, to which he was induced by an admiration of several English authors whose works he had read in French and German. He is now able to read English prose with tolerable facility and has been of late studying Shakespeare, having actually read two or three of his plays.

"I took the liberty to observe that as Shakespeare's genius had traced every labyrinth and penetrated into every recess of the human heart, his sentiments could not fail to please his Royal Highness. But, as his language was uncommonly bold and figurative and full of allusions to national customs and the manners of our island two centuries ago, the English themselves, who had not made a particular study of his works, did not always comprehend their full energy. I added that to transfuse the soul of Shakespeare into a translation was impossible, and to taste all his beauties in the original required such a knowledge of the English manners and language as few foreigners, even after a long residence in the capital, could attain.

"The Prince said he was aware of all this, yet he was determined to struggle hard for some acquaintance with an author so much admired by the English nation. That though he should never be able to taste all his excellencies, he was convinced he should understand enough to compensate him for his trouble. That he had already studied some detached parts, which he thought superior to anything he had ever met with in the works of any other poet.

"His Royal Highness attends to military business with as much assiduity as most officers of the same rank in the army, for in the Prussian service, no degree of eminence in the article of birth can excuse a remission in the duties of that profession. He is much esteemed by the army and considered as an exceedingly good officer. To the frankness of a soldier, he joins the integrity of a German, and is beloved by the public in general, on account of his good-nature, affability, and humane turn of mind."

— John Moore, from an account of Frederick c. 1779, in the former's travelogue A View of Society and Manners in France, Switzerland, and Germany

== Reign ==
=== Domestic politics ===
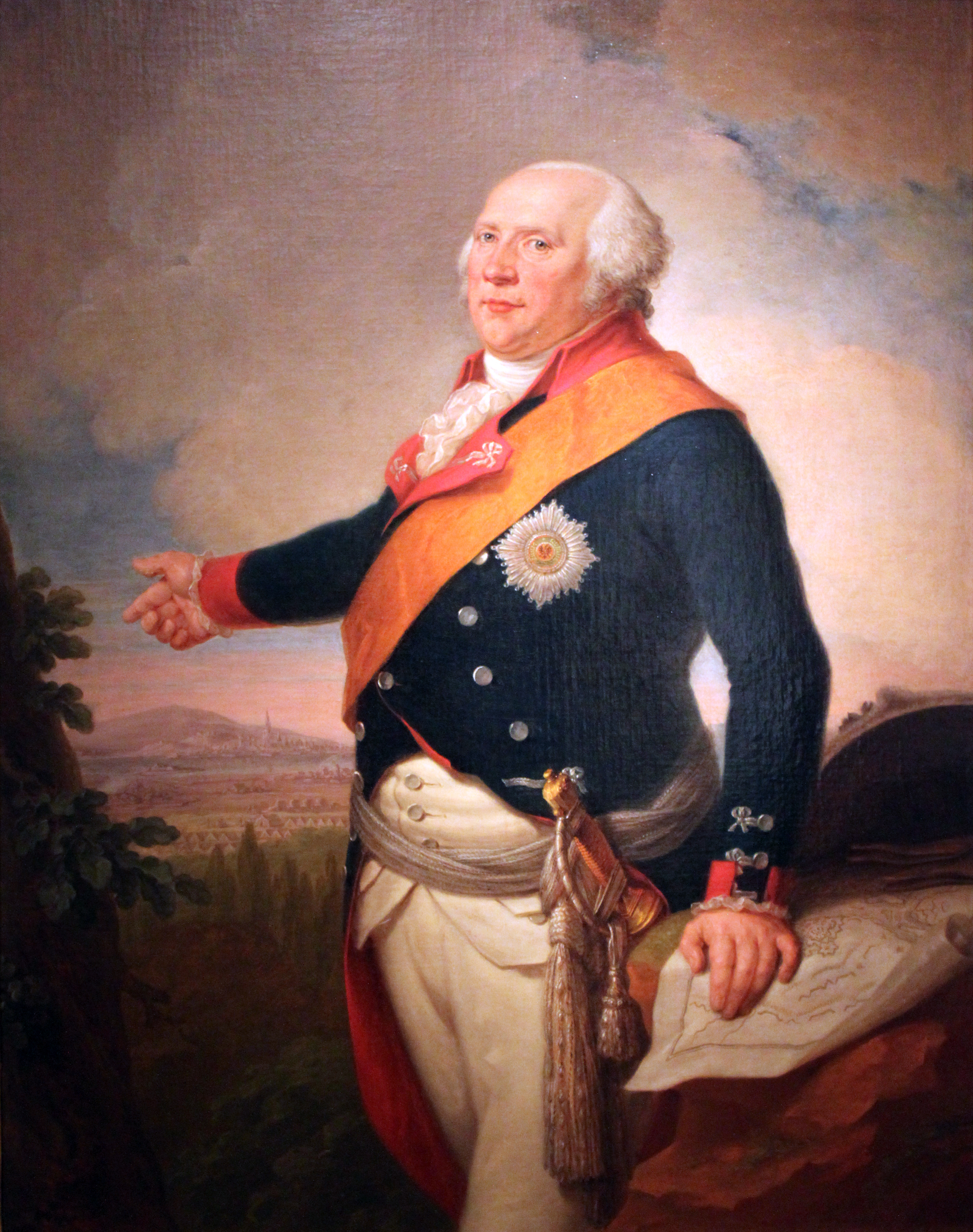
Portrait of Frederick William II, by Johann Christoph Frisch, c. 1794

Frederick William's accession to the throne (17 August 1786) was followed by a series of measures for lightening the burdens of the people, reforming the oppressive French system of tax-collecting introduced by Frederick, and encouraging trade by the diminution of customs dues and the making of roads and canals. This gave the new king much popularity with the masses; the educated classes were pleased by Frederick William's reversal of his uncle's preference for the French language and the promotion of the German language, with the admission of German writers to the Prussian Academy of Arts, and by the active encouragement given to schools and universities. Frederick William also terminated his predecessor's state monopolies for coffee and tobacco and the sugar monopoly. Under his reign the codification known as Allgemeines Preußisches Landrecht, initiated by Frederick II, continued and was completed in 1794.

=== Foreign policies ===
In the 18th century, the field of foreign policy was considered the highest statecraft and the "main business" of an absolutist prince. Accordingly, Frederick William II was best prepared in this political area. Officially, he alone decided on war and peace. In terms of alliance politics, Prussia was in a difficult situation when Frederick II died: the Austro-Russian Alliance (1781), the unreliability of the Kingdom of Great Britain and the Franco-Austrian Alliance in 1756 led to Prussia's foreign policy isolation. Frederick William II's goal of consolidating the kingdom's position as a major power, which it had achieved under Frederick II, was therefore seriously endangered from the start. Above all, Frederick William's Minister of War Ewald Friedrich von Hertzberg demanded that the king not wait for a change in the European alliance system, but rather actively bring it about.

The transatlantic and European revolutions formed the background of Frederick Wilhelm's foreign policy. In his world, which was essentially the world of the Ancien Régime, they initially only appeared to Prussia as distant rumblings of thunder. However, the consequences of the upheavals associated with the French Revolution in particular could not have been predicted at the time.

=== Personal life ===
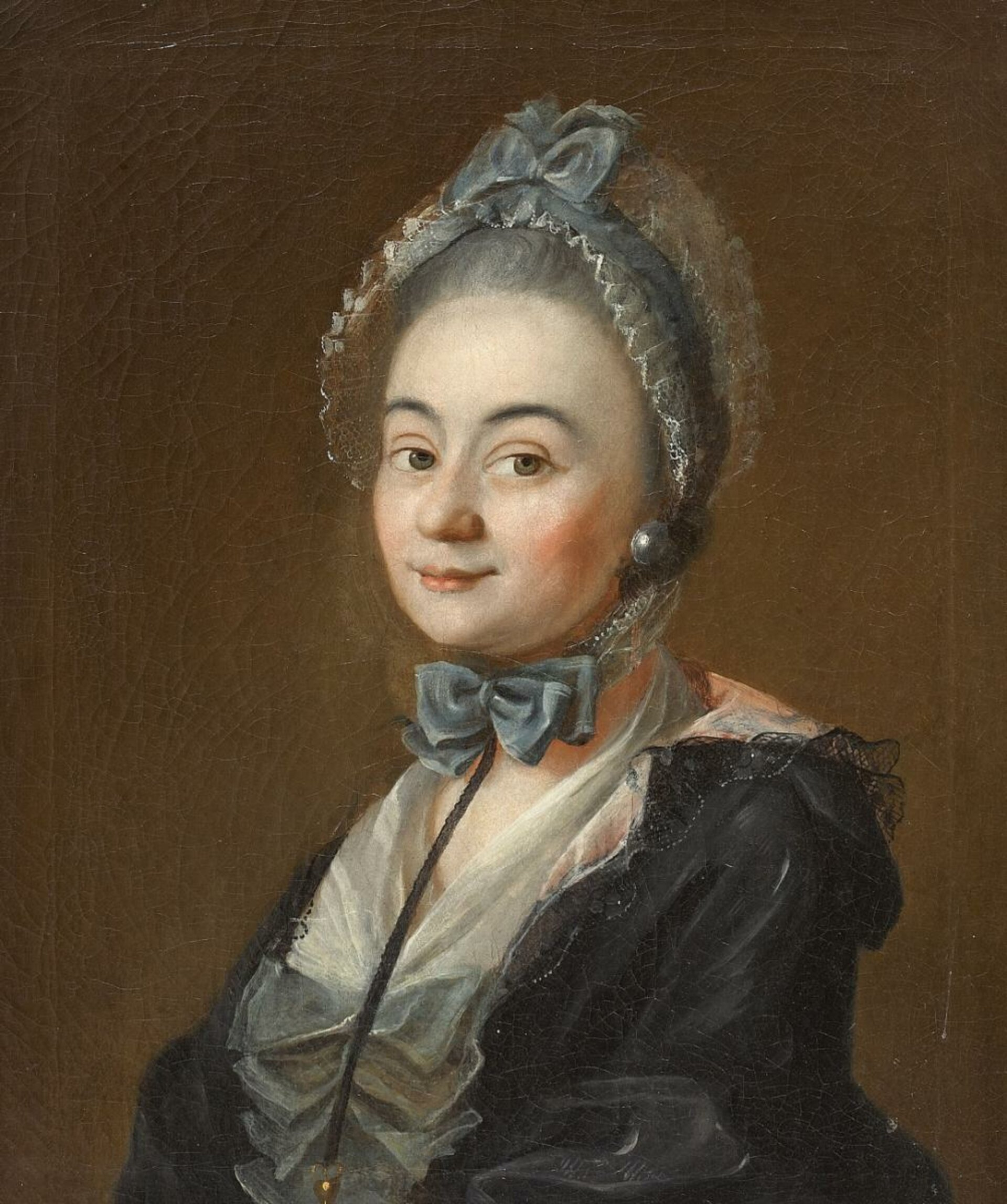
Wilhelmine Enke, Countess of Lichtenau. Friedrich Wilhelm's friend, confidant, and mistress.

Frederick II selected Elisabeth Christine of Brunswick as Frederick William's new wife, and had them married in 1765. This unhappy marriage ended after only four years during which both spouses had been unfaithful. Frederick II granted a divorce reluctantly. Frederick William was then married to Frederica Louisa of Hesse-Darmstadt in 1769 which lasted until his death in 1797. From 1769 to 1782 Wilhelmine Enke was his mistress. Following this relationship she became his closest confidant and advisor. In 1794–1797 he had a palace built for her on the Pfaueninsel. Frederick William was involved with two more mistresses during his life, both conducted through morganatic marriage, which were also bigamous, since his wife queen Frederica Louisa was still alive. The first was with Elisabeth Amalie, Gräfin von Voß, Gräfin von Ingenheim in 1787, and the second with Sophie Juliane Gräfin von Dönhoff. His favourite son —with Wilhelmine Enke— was Graf Alexander von der Mark. His daughter from Sophie Juliane was Countess Julie of Brandenburg (4 January 1793, Neuchâtel – 29 January 1848, Vienna), who later married Frederick Ferdinand, Duke of Anhalt-Köthen.

=== Patron of the Arts ===
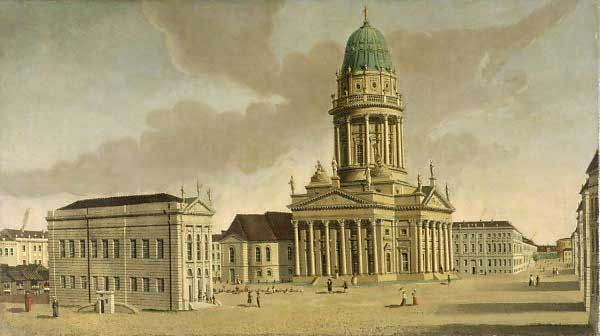
National Theatre on Gendarmenmarkt

Frederick William was a passionate supporter of the arts. Upon ascending to the throne Frederick William turned the cultural focus of the country away from the French culture that Frederick II had established. For instance, the French Theatre was transformed into the National Theater on Gendarmenmarkt where performances of German opera and plays were performed. During its opening, Frederick William declared, "We are Germans, and we intend to remain so." The Royal Opera played works by Johann Frederick Reichardt and Wolfgang Amadeus Mozart. Berlin developed into a cultural center of the Classical era, competing with London, Paris, Dresden, and Vienna. The king himself was a passionate cellist. When government affairs allowed, he spent about 2 hours daily with the instrument. With 70 permanently employed musicians, the king's court orchestra was considered one of the largest in Europe.

Buildings constructed under his reign were the Marmorpalais in Potsdam and the world-famous Brandenburg Gate in Berlin.

=== Mysticism ===
Frederick William II was inclined towards occultism. At the end of the 18th century, the circles of the bourgeoisie and the nobility, unsettled by the Enlightenment, were in search of mystical Christian experiences. Since the official church could not alleviate this uncertainty, they turned to various religious orders, including the Rosicrucians. During this time, the Rosicrucians believed they were chosen by God to free people's souls from sin, lust, and pride.

Deeply religious Crown Prince Frederick William was enthused by these ideals and joined the Order in 1781. Two of the leading representatives of the order, Johann Christoph von Wöllner and Johann Rudolf von Bischoffwerder, managed to convince the crown prince of their teachings. By highlighting the supposed godlessness of his previous lifestyle, which had been unconcerned with matters of sexuality, they saw the opportunity to displace his most significant competitor, Frederick William's Mistress, Wilhelmine Enke. In reality, Frederick William gave up his sexual relationship with the future countess but remained closely connected to her in a friendly manner.

== Death and legacy ==
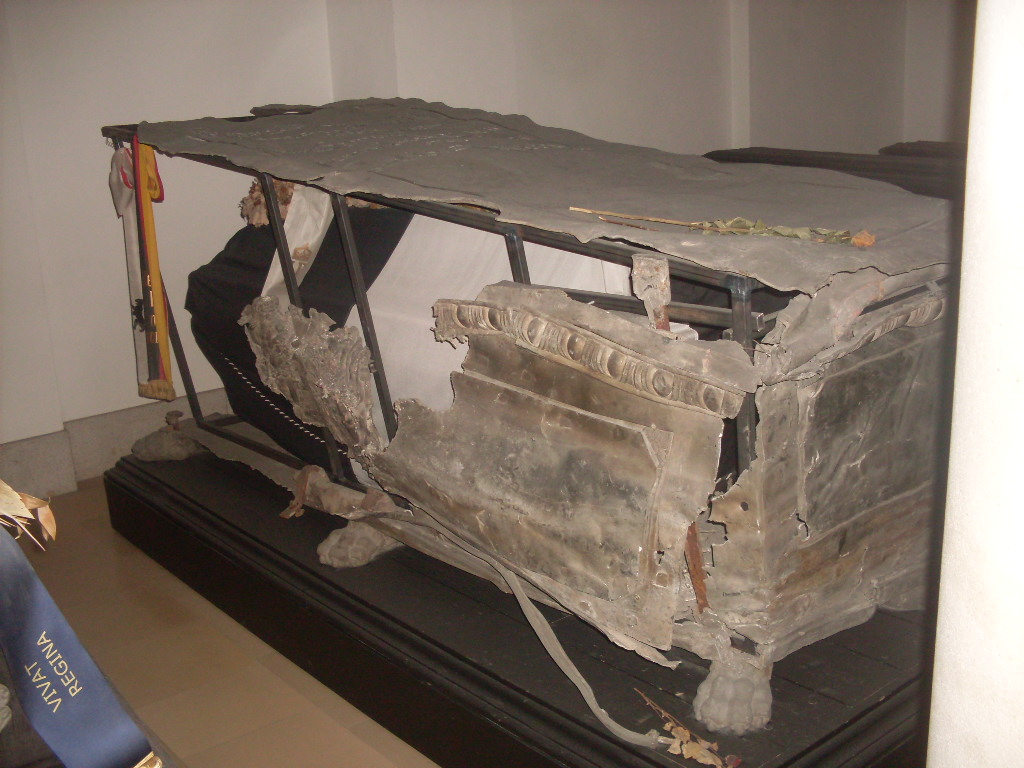
Tomb of Frederick William II in Hohenzollern crypt in the Berliner Dom

In early October 1797, Frederick William II withdrew from the Berlin court life. He never left the Marmorpalais in Potsdam again. Only a few confidants, such as Countess Lichtenau, as well as French nobles who had fled before the French Revolution, gathered around the dying king. On 9 November 1797 Frederick William handed over the government affairs to his son because he was no longer physically capable of doing so due to shortness of breath and immobility. During a seizure, Frederick William II died on 16 November 1797 at 8:58 a.m., at the age of 53, in the "paneled writing cabinet" of the Marmorpalais.

The burial of the late king took place on 11 December 1797, with a simple procession. Eight major generals carried the coffin. After the sermon, the service concluded with a cannon salute. The court society mourned for six weeks, during which time amusements such as theater and music events were forbidden both at the court and in the country. Additional religious services were held.

Frederick William's eulogy was published in the "Berlinische Zeitung" on 14 December 1797:

"Frederick William completed the great legislative work begun by Frederick. And if this were the only deed that glorified his regal life: how surely must he achieve immortality through it alone! - He will forever live in the annals of our history as the happy enlarger of his country. The grandchildren of our new brothers in Franconia and on the Vistula will always celebrate the day when they became Prussians, and humanity itself can celebrate him because these acquisitions were not the result of terrible wars [...]. His contemporaries called him 'The Kind One,' and centuries later, people will still joyfully appreciate his benevolent deeds. He built, benefiting and enhancing, for posterity. Thanks to him, several of our provinces received paved and sturdy roads, which our country had been lacking until then (Chausseen in Westphalia, in Silesia, in Magdeburg, in Brandenburg). Elsewhere, he elevated the convenience of transportation and the advantage of residents through canals (in the Ruppin area, after the rebuilding of the burned-down city). Many places and regions, especially the capital of the empire, were equipped by him with substantial residential buildings and palaces, with beneficial institutions of all kinds (just to name a few: the expansion of the Charité, the veterinary school, the construction of the Marienkirchthurm, the construction of several gates and city walls, an iron and other bridges, the construction of new city prisons, etc.), as well as admirable monuments. As long as there is still a sense of nature and a taste for art among the inhabitants of Berlin, that is, as long as Berlin exists, the name of the king cannot fade, who, at the end of the most beautiful street and at the entrance to the most beautiful pleasure forest, had the magnificent gate erected, which so boldly opposes the Greek architectural works."

Frederick William was interred in a vault of the old Berlin Cathedral. Countess Lichtenau, who had cared for the dying king, was no longer allowed to see the deceased and was placed under house arrest. Frederick William III had the father's despised lover sent into exile in Glogau and most of her wealth confiscated.

Dieter Brozat reported in "Der Berliner Dom und die Hohenzollerngruft" (1985) that the sarcophagus of Frederick William II in the Hohenzollern vault was heavily damaged during World War II. This is attributed to Soviet looting, and incendiary bomb damage. During the reconstruction of the cathedral, parts of a skeleton were found, suggesting embalming of the body. Brozat believes these remains to be those of Frederick William II.

== Ancestry ==
Ancestors of Frederick William II of Prussia

8. Frederick I of Prussia
4. Frederick William I of Prussia
9. Princess Sophia Charlotte of Hanover
2. Prince Augustus William of Prussia
10. George I of Great Britain
5. Princess Sophia Dorothea of Hanover
11. Princess Sophia Dorothea of Celle
1. Frederick William II of Prussia
12. Ferdinand Albert I, Duke of Brunswick-Wolfenbüttel-Bevern
6. Ferdinand Albert II, Duke of Brunswick-Wolfenbüttel
13. Princess Christine of Hesse-Eschwege
3. Duchess Luise of Brunswick-Wolfenbüttel
14. Louis Rudolph, Duke of Brunswick-Wolfenbüttel
7. Duchess Antoinette of Brunswick-Wolfenbüttel
15. Princess Christine Louise of Oettingen-Oettingen

== Children ==
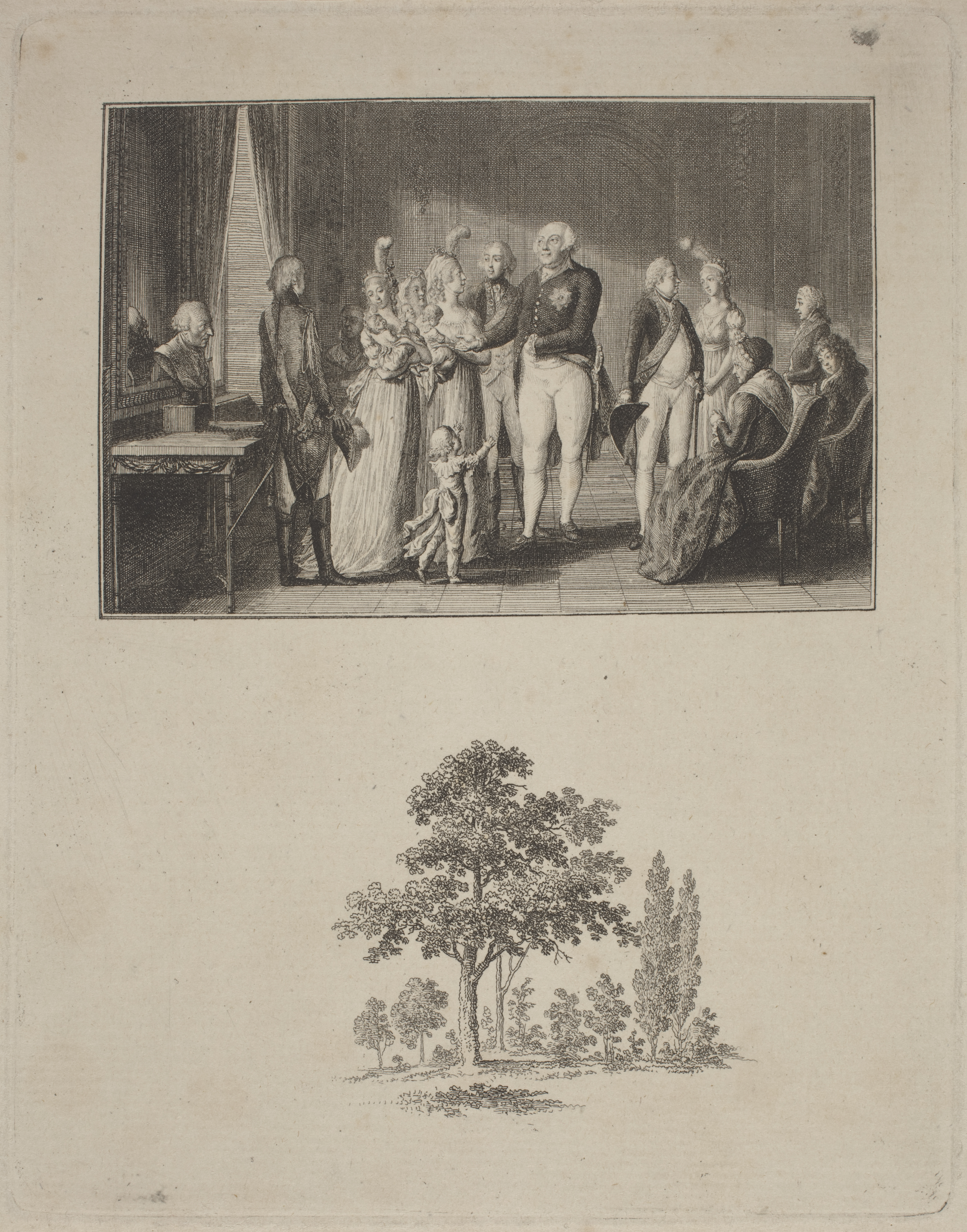
Prussian Royal Family

Frederick William II had the following children:

- By his first cousin Duchess Elisabeth Christine of Brunswick-Wolfenbüttel:
  - Princess Frederica Charlotte (7 May 1767 – 6 August 1820), who became Duchess of York and Albany by her marriage to Prince Frederick, Duke of York and Albany, no issue
- By Princess Frederica Louisa of Hesse-Darmstadt:
  - Frederick William III (3 August 1770 – 7 June 1840), married Duchess Louise of Mecklenburg-Strelitz, had issue
  - Princess Christine (31 August 1772 – 14 June 1773) died in infancy
  - Prince Louis Charles (5 November 1773 – 28 December 1796), married Duchess Frederica of Mecklenburg-Strelitz, had issue
  - Princess Wilhelmine (18 November 1774 – 12 October 1837), who became Queen of the Netherlands by her marriage to King William I of the Netherlands, had issue
  - Princess Augusta (1 May 1780 – 19 February 1841), who became Electress of Hesse by her marriage to William II, Elector of Hesse, had issue
  - Prince Henry (30 December 1781 – 12 July 1846)
  - Prince William (3 July 1783 – 28 September 1851), married Princess Maria Anna of Hesse-Homburg, had issue

Frederick William II of Prussia House of Hohenzollern Born: 25 September 1744 Died: 16 November 1797
Regnal titles
Preceded by Frederick II	King of Prussia; Elector of Brandenburg; Prince of Neuchâtel; 1786–1797	Succeeded by Frederick William III
