= Julie von Voss =

- Countess Ingenheim
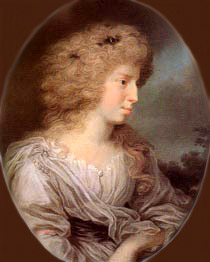
- Portrait by Johann Heinrich Schröder, c.1785
- Born: 24 July 1766
- Died: 25 March 1789 (aged 22)
- Spouse: Frederick William II of Prussia (m. 1787)
- Issue: Gustav Adolf Wilhelm von Ingenheim
- Father: Friedrich Christian von Voss
- Mother: Amalia Ottilia av Vieregg

Julie Amalie Elisabeth von Voss (24 July 1766, Buch (Berlin) – 25 March 1789) was a German lady-in-waiting and a bigamous morganatic spouse of King Frederick William II of Prussia.

== Life ==
She was the daughter of Friedrich Christian von Voss and Amalia Ottilia von Vieregg. Her uncle was chamberlain to the queen dowager. In 1783, she became lady-in-waiting to the Prussian queen, Frederika Louisa of Hesse-Darmstadt.

She was nicknamed "Miss Bessy" at court as an anglophile, and was not regarded as beautiful or clever, but fascinated the king by refusing his advances. She was persuaded to "sacrifice herself for the country" and accept the king by her relative Count Finckenstein, who wished to replace Wilhelmine von Lichtenau, with the argument that she would be able to save the king from the bad company of his circle. She accepted on condition that the queen's consent should be gained to a left-handed marriage with the King to ease her conscience.

She was married to Frederick in a ceremony in the chapel of Charlottenburg Palace on 7 April 1787, and was given the title Countess Ingenheim. She was reportedly not happy about her new circumstances, always treated the queen with gentle respect and never tried to take on the role of queen.

She died of consumption, two months after giving birth to a son, Gustav Adolf Wilhelm.

== See also ==
- Elisabeth Helene von Vieregg
