= Charles Porset =

French writer and historian

- Born: April 15, 1944; Sées
- Died: May 25, 2011 (aged 67); Paris
- Occupations: writer and historian

Charles Porset (15 April 1944 – 25 May 2011, aged 67) was a French writer and historian. He wrote numerous books, articles and papers on the "Fait Masonic" in the eighteenth century.

== Biography ==
Charles Porset taught philosophy in high school until 1976, before entering the École normale supérieure of Fontenay-aux-Roses in 1977 as an agrégation lecturer. At that time, he participated in the founding of the Society for the History and Epistemology of Language Sciences, in collaboration with Sylvain Auroux.

In charge of research at the CNRS within the framework of the URA 96 of the CNRS in Paris IV, "dixhuitièmiste", he renews the reading of Montesquieu, Voltaire and Rousseau His work revisits the thinking of the Lumières. His field of study included close contact with the school of Ulrich Ricken, a specialist in the linguistics and anthropology of the Enlightenment at the Martin Luther University of Halle-Wittenberg, in the German Democratic Republic, where he spent a research period in 1978.

== Freemason ==
Charles Porset was a member of the Grand Orient de France, in which he held several important positions defending a modern, committed and demanding conception of freemasonry.

As historiographer, one of his most important work is the Dictionnaire prosopographique consacré au monde maçonnique des Lumières (Europe-Amériques et dépendances) which he co-directed with the academic Cécile Révauger.

== Main publications ==
- 1995: Voltaire franc-maçon
- 1996: Les Philalèthes et les Convents de Paris. Honoré Campion. 1996. p. 776. ISBN 978-2852035348..
- 1996: Mirabeau Franc-Maçon publisher: Rumeur des Ages ISBN 2843270014
- 2000: Hiram sans-culotte ?;Franc-maçonnerie, Lumières et Révolution. Dix-huitièmes siècles. Honoré Campion. 1998. p. 442. ISBN 978-2852038615.
- 2003: Voltaire Humaniste. Edimaf. 2012. p. 160. ISBN 978-2919601226.
- 2012: Oser penser !;Notes intempestives d'histoire maçonnique. Éditions à l'orient. June 2012. p. 613. ISBN 9782912591616.
- 2012: La devise maçonnique Liberté, Égalité, Fraternité. Encyclopédie maçonnique. Éditions Maçonniques de France. 2012. p. 88. ISBN 9782919601165.
- 2013: Cécile Révauger; Charles Porset (2013). Le monde maçonnique des Lumières. Europe-Amérique et colonies;Dictionnaire prosopographique. DR26. Honoré Champion. ISBN 978-2745324962.

== See also ==
- Freemasonry in France
