= Luckner =

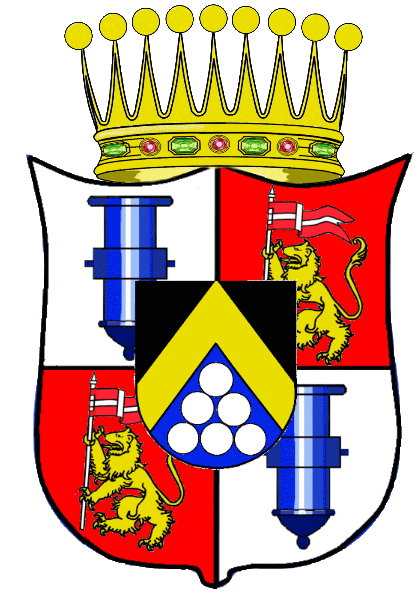
Coat of arms of Counts von Luckner

Luckner is the name of the German noble family, originated from Upper Palatinate, whose members occupied significant positions in France, Denmark, Saxony and later within the German Empire. On 31 March 1784, the family was awarded with the title of Count in Denmark by King Christian VII.

== Notable members ==
- Count Nicolas von Luckner (1722–1794), German military officer in French service
- Felix von Luckner, grandson of Count Nicolas

== Related ==
Several "Luckner" Ultra Heavy Tanks have been constructed, both as models, and in computer wargames, by a number of different fantasy wargame producers, as a tribute Felix von Luckner status as a "good guy" war hero.
