= Cécile Révauger =

French historian and historiographer (born 1955)

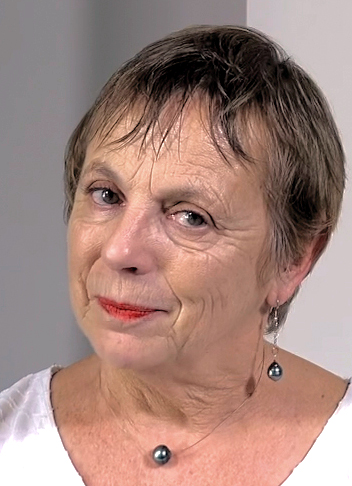
- Révauger in 2018.
- Born: 1955 (age 70–71); Bordeaux, France
- Occupations: Historian; historiographer
- Known for: Research on Freemasonry and the Lumières
- Awards: Fulbright Scholarship

Academic background
- Education: University of Bordeaux III
- Thesis: La franc-maçonnerie en Grande–Bretagne et aux États-Unis au XVIIIe : 1717–1813 (1987)

Academic work
- Discipline: History, Historiography
- Sub-discipline: Freemasonry, Enlightenment, History of the English-speaking Caribbean
- Main interests: Freemasonry, the Lumières, Historiography, History of the Caribbean

Cécile Révauger (born Bordeaux, 1955) is a French historian and historiographer in the fields of freemasonry and the Lumières. A freemason, she was initiated in 1982 at the Grande Loge féminine de France. She left this grand lodge to join the Grand Orient de France in 2013.

== Masonic historiography ==
Besides Freemasonry, her research are devoted to the Lumières and the historiography of the Lumières as well as to the history of the English-speaking Caribbean, from the time of plantation companies to the abolition of slavery.

Her research on the eighteenth incited her to examine Freemasonry, born in the Age of Enlightenment. Cécile Révauger focused therefore on a largely unexplored area by the university community. She at first met a certain distrust from Anglo-Saxon Grand Lodges that demonstrated reserves regarding the public character of her work.

Révauger gained a Fulbright scholarship from the Franco-American Commission, which enabled her to conduct research in the libraries of large American lodges in Boston, Washington DC and Cedar Rapids. She thus had access to the most extensive collections of Masonic archives of the United States and, thanks to the quality and quantity of information considered, she wrote a State thesis entitled: La franc-maçonnerie en Grande–Bretagne et aux États-Unis au XVIIIe : 1717–1813 ("Freemasonry in Britain and the United States in the eighteenth. 1717–1813"), supported at the University of Bordeaux III in 1987. By gaining a second search scholarship, she worked on the archives of Prince Hall lodges in New York and Washington DC and wrote a book on Black Freemasonry in the United States published in 2012: Prince Hall au XVIIIe aux États-Unis - Noirs et Franc-Maçons.

Révauger writes in collaboration numerous articles on Masonic subjects and several anthologies. She completed a common work started in collaboration with historian and author Charles Porset before his disappearance: Le Monde maçonnique des Lumières. Europe-Amériques et Colonies, Dictionnaire biographique de franc-maçons du siècle des Lumières.

== Main publications ==
Cécile Révauger heads the journal Lumières at Presses Universitaires de Bordeaux. She is the author or co-author of the following publications:

- Cécile Révauger; Ludovic Marcos (2015). Les Ordres de Sagesse du Rite Français. Paris: Dervy. ISBN 979-10-242-0115-3..
- Cécile Révauger (2014). Noirs et francs-maçons. Dervy. ISBN 9789791024204..
- Cécile Révauger; Charles Porset (2013). Le monde maçonnique des Lumières. Europe-Amérique et colonies;Dictionnaire prosopographique. DR26. Honoré Champion. ISBN 978-2745324962..
- Cécile Révauger; Jacques de Cauna (2013). La Société des plantations esclavagistes : Caraïbes francophone, anglophone, hispanophone - Regards croisés. Rivages des Xantons. Les Indes savantes. ISBN 978-2846543446..
- Cécile Révauger (2012). Prince Hall au XVIIIe aux États-Unis - Noirs et Franc-Maçons. Edimaf. ISBN 978-2919601196..
- (2008). The Abolition of Slavery: The British Debate, 1787-1840
- Cécile Révauger; Charles Porset (2006). Franc-maçonnerie et religions dans l'Europe des Lumières. Champion Classiques. Honoré Champion. ISBN 978-2745314734..
