= Wilhelmine, Gräfin von Lichtenau =

- Countess von Lichtenau
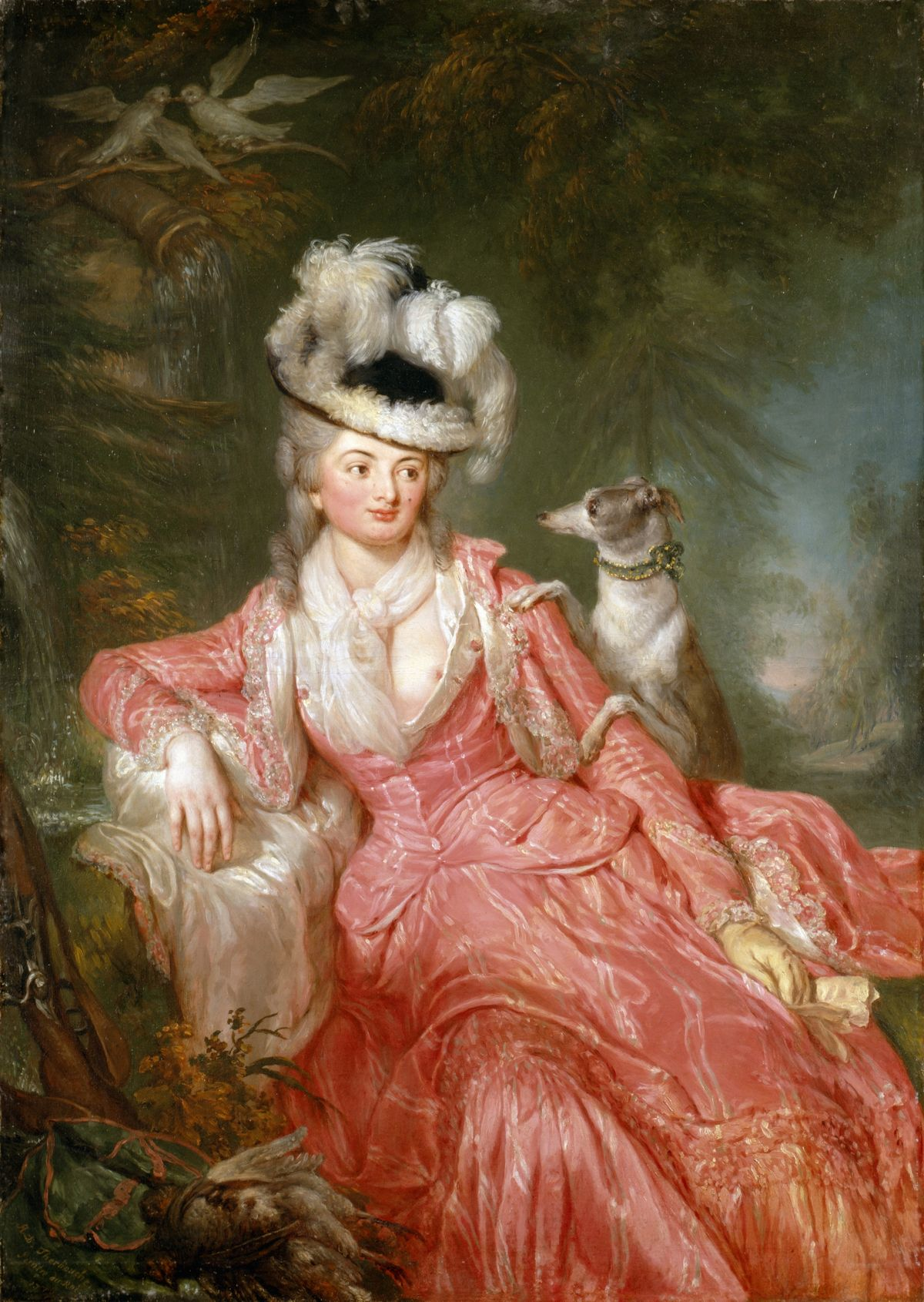
- Portrait by Anna Dorothea Therbusch, 1776.
- Born: 29 December 1753
- Died: 9 June 1820 (aged 66)
- Spouse: Johann Friedrich Rietz; Franz Ignaz Holbein
- Father: Johann Elias Enke

Wilhelmine, Gräfin von Lichtenau, born as Wilhelmine Enke, also spelled Encke (29 December 1753 in Dessau – 9 June 1820 in Berlin), was the official mistress of King Frederick William II of Prussia from 1769 until 1797 and was elevated by him into the nobility. She is regarded as politically active and influential in the policy of Prussia during his reign.

== Biography ==
The future Countess (Gräfin in German) von Lichetenau's father, Johann Elias Enke, was a chamber musician in service of King Frederick II of Prussia. Wilhelmine met Crown Prince Fredrick William in 1764. The king preferred that the crown prince maintain a relationship with her rather than have changing relationships with foreign women, and in 1769 she became the crown prince's official mistress.

The couple had five children, of whom only the youngest survived to adulthood:

- A daughter (born and died 10 August 1770).
- Ulrike Sophie von Berckholz (March 1774 – 5 September 1774)
- Christina Sophie Frederica von Lützenberg (25 August 1777 – 31 August 1777)
- Count Alexander von der Marck (4 January 1779 – 1 August 1787), reportedly the King's favorite child; he was probably poisoned
- Countess Marianne Diderica Frederica Wilhelmine von der Marck (29 February 1780 – 11 June 1814)

Countess von Lichtenau's youngest child, Countess Marianne von der Marck, survived into adulthood: she married firstly, on 17 March 1797, Hereditary Count Frederick of Stolberg-Stolberg (1769–1805); they divorced in 1799. Her second marriage, on 14 March 1801, was to Baron Kaspar von Miaskowski (1771–1813); they were also subsequently divorced. Her third and final marriage was in 1807 to French aristocrat Étienne de Thierry (d. 1843). She had four daughters Louise of Stolberg, Joséphine von Miaskowski, Eugénie de Thierry and Camille de Thierry over her three marriages, the eldest of them was the notorious poet Countess Louise of Stolberg-Stolberg.

In 1782, Frederick William arranged for her to marry his councillor and chamberlain Johann Friedrich Rietz (1755–1809), but the relationship between Wilhelmine and Fredrick William continued.

It is debated whether Wilhelmine co-operated with Johann Rudolph von Bischoffswerder and Johann Christoph von Wöllner to keep the monarch under control. Wilhelmine was given the title Countess von Lichtenau in 1794, but this was not made public for two years, until 1796.

After Frederick William died in 1797, Wilhelmine was exiled and her property confiscated, although she was finally granted a pension in 1800. From 1802 to 1806, she had a second marriage to the dramatic Franz Ignaz von Holbein, known as "Fontano" and 26 years her junior, in Breslau (now in Poland and renamed Wrocław). In 1811, Napoleon allowed her to return to Berlin.

== Legacy ==
Wilhelmine, known popularly as "Beautiful Wilhelmine", is closely associated with the Marmorpalais in Potsdam. As Friedrich Wilhelm II's official mistress, she had great influence on the interior decoration of the palace. Following plans by Michael Philipp Boumann, an early classicist style townhouse called Lichtenau Palace was erected for her at the edge of Potsdam's Neuer Garten, at a site on today's Behlertstrasse.

During her lifetime, she was the subject of satire, and following fake memoirs, she published her own. She is a main character in Ernst von Salomon's 1965 novel Die schöne Wilhelmine, which also was turned into a 1984 television serial Beautiful Wilhelmine.

== See also ==
- Julie von Voß
- Sophie von Dönhoff
