= Prinz-Albrecht-Palais =

Coordinates: 52°30′22″N 13°23′8″E

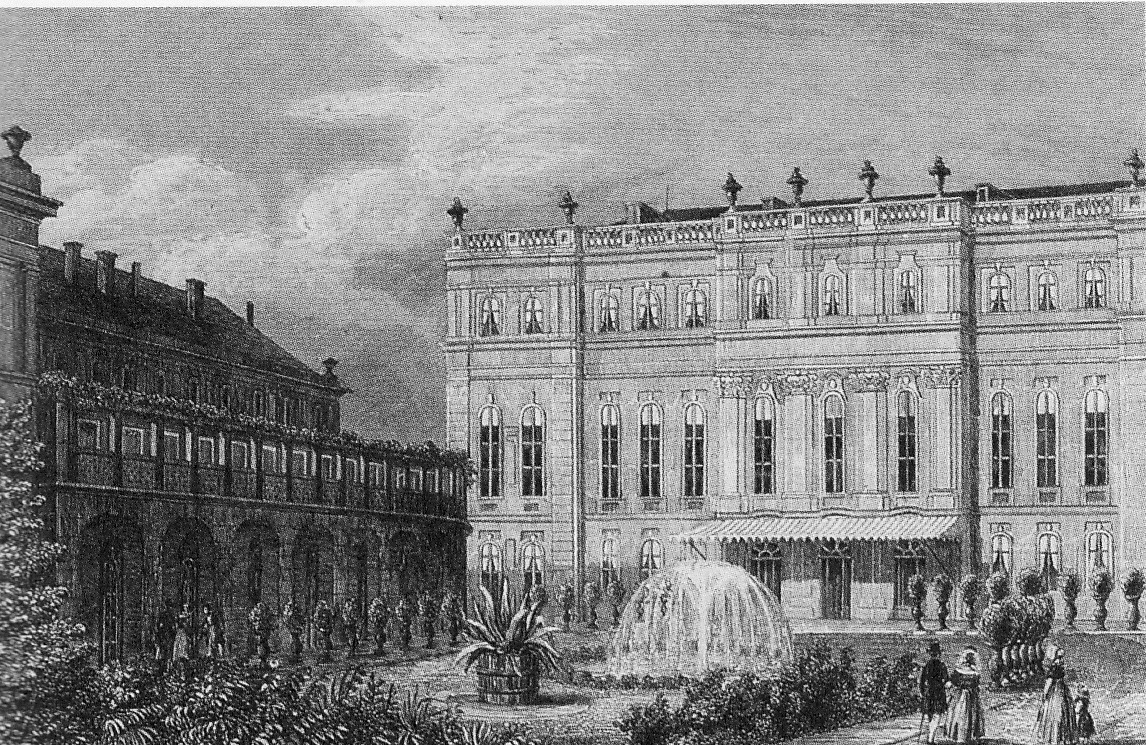
Prinz-Albrecht-Palais, 1837

The Prinz-Albrecht-Palais was a Rococo city palace in the historic Friedrichstadt suburb of Berlin, Germany. It was located on Wilhelmstrasse 102 in the present-day Kreuzberg district, in the vicinity of Potsdamer Platz.

== History ==
The building was erected in 1737–39 in the course of the city development of the boggy grounds in southern Friedrichstadt at the behest of King Frederick William I of Prussia, it was to serve as a residence for the French Baron François Mathieu Vernezobre de Laurieux (1690–1748). The well-off baron and his family had left Paris after the collapse of John Law's Mississippi Company in 1720 and befriended with the king. The three-storey building had a courtyard open to the street, two economic wings on the left and right of the entrance, as well as extended gardens in the rear, stretching up to the Berlin Customs Wall in the west. When the King ordered Vernezobre to marry his daughter to Friedrich Wilhelm Quirin von Forcade de Biaix, who she rejected, the marriage was only averted when he agreed to undertake the construction of a prestigious city residence for the King in the Husarenstraße, later renamed Wilhelmstrasse in honor of the King, who died in 1740.

Vernezobre's heirs had to sell the premises in 1760, and in 1772 they were acquired by the royal House of Hohenzollern as a summer residence of King Frederick William's daughter Princess Anna Amalia, the youngest sister of Frederick the Great. Upon her death in 1787 it served in 1796 as a quarantine station for the then spectacular smallpox vaccination of the Prussian Crown Prince Friedrich Wilhelm. Occupied by Napoleon's troops after the 1806 Battle of Jena-Auerstedt and temporarily used as a depository, the building decayed and fell into disrepair afterwards.

Finally, in 1830 it was acquired by Prince Albert of Prussia, youngest son of King Frederick William III of Prussia, upon his marriage with Princess Marianne of the Netherlands. He had the Palais remodeled as his residence by Karl Friedrich Schinkel, surrounded by a park laid out according to plans designed by Peter Joseph Lenné, including a riding stable and an ice rink open to the public. However, the prince's marriage turned out to be an unhappy one, the couple divorced in 1849 and Albert entered into a morganatic marriage with Rosalie von Rauch, wherefore he had to leave the Prussian court. He moved to the Saxon capital Dresden, where he had Schloss Albrechtsberg erected by architect Adolf Lohse, who from 1860 to 1862 also refurbished the Berlin palace. Meanwhile, the formerly remote area had become a major hub with the opening of the nearby Potsdamer Bahnhof and Anhalter Bahnhof railway stations in 1838 and 1841.

After Prince Albert's death in 1872, the building was inherited by his son Prince Albrecht. The property was managed by the valet August Sabac el Cher, an Afro-German descending from Sudanese Kurdufan, who had been "presented" to his father by Wāli Muhammad Ali of Egypt at Cairo in 1843. The building remained in private hands of the Hohenzollern dynasty even after the German Revolution of 1918–1919.

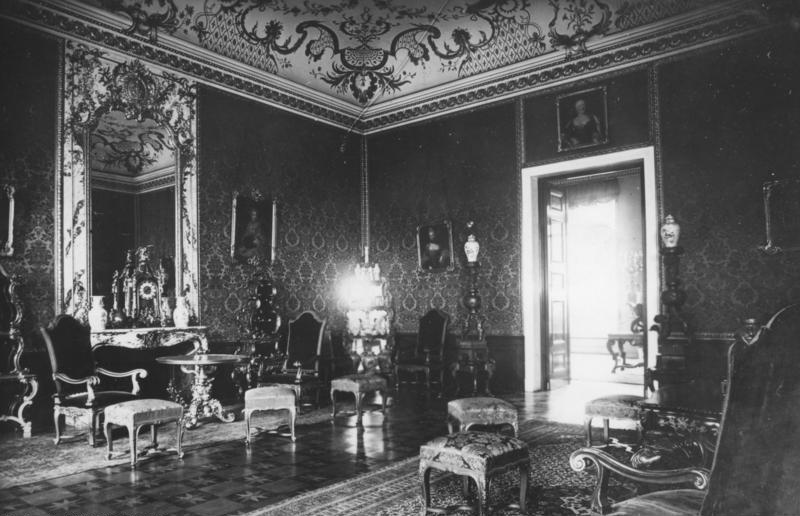
A salon in the Palais, 1928

In 1926 the large Europahaus was built in the rear gardens. From 1928 to 1931, the Palais was rented by the German government and used as a state guesthouse, hosting such guests as King Amānullāh Khān of Afghanistan in 1928 and King Fuad I of Egypt in 1929.

The last chapter in the Palais' history began after the Nazi Machtergreifung in 1933. In May, the headquarters of the newly established Gestapo secret police moved into a neighbouring building around the corner on Prinz-Albrecht-Strasse. When in 1934 the Sicherheitsdienst intelligence agency of the Reichsführer SS Heinrich Himmler took control over the Gestapo, Sicherheitsdienst chief Reinhard Heydrich moved from Munich to the Berlin Prinz-Albrecht-Palais. In 1935 also the neighbouring buildings at 101 Wilhelmstrasse and 103/104 Wilhelmstrasse were taken over and integrated into the large complex, which in 1939 became the main administrative seat of the SS-Reichssicherheitshauptamt (RSHA).

The Palais and the adjacent buildings were destroyed during the Battle of Berlin in a RAF air attack on 23 November 1944. Seized by the Soviet Military Administration in Germany after the war, the realty was incorporated into the American sector of Allied-occupied Berlin. The ruins were cleared in 1955, but the site was left vacant. In 1961 Prince Louis Ferdinand of Prussia, head of the House of Hohenzollern, officially renounced all claims to the realty. Today the area is used for the Topography of Terror exhibition, which focuses on the human rights abuses of the Nazi police state.
