= Germany–Sudan relations =

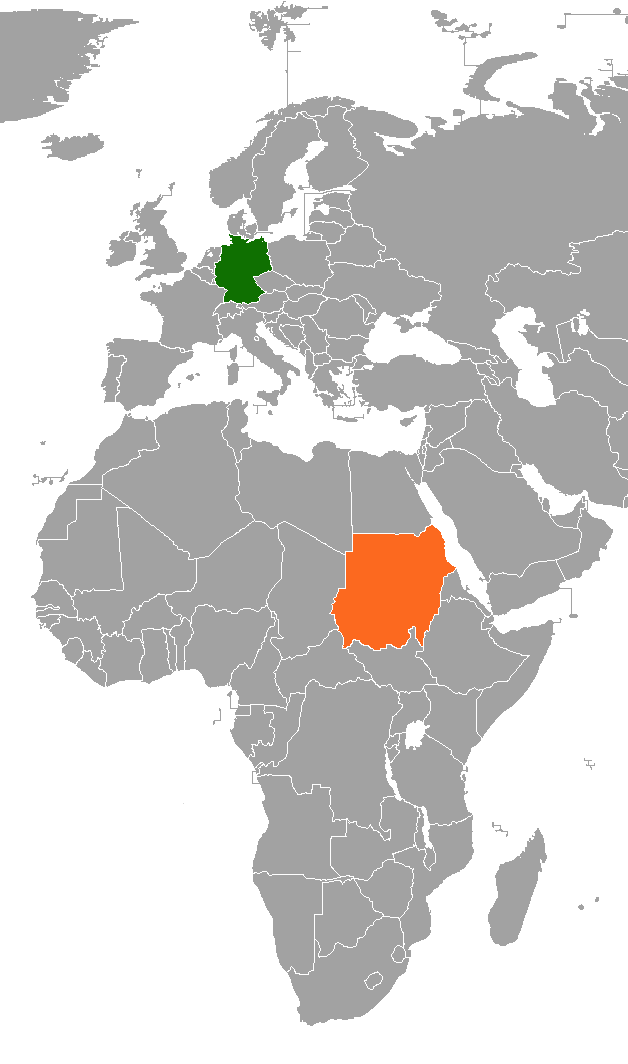

- Germany: Sudan

Germany–Sudan relations are the current and historical relations between Germany and Sudan. The Federal Republic of Germany was the first country to recognize Sudan diplomatically in 1956. Due to its mediating position in the various armed conflicts in the country, Germany is a trusted partner for Sudan.

== History ==
In 1843, a Prussian expedition to Egypt (Lepsius Expedition) reached what is now Sudan. As a result of the trip, the Sudanese August Sabac el Cher became valet of the Prussian Prince Albrecht and one of the first socially integrated Afro-Germans. In 1869, the German botanist Georg Schweinfurth made a journey through Sudan. Gustav Nachtigal also explored the country a little later. The German Emin Pasha was governor of the province of Equatoria in Ottoman Sudan for the Ottomans starting in 1878.

The Federal Republic of Germany (FRG) established a diplomatic liaison office in Khartoum in 1955, which became a legation on March 12, 1956, and an embassy on October 21, 1959. In the same year, Fritz Werner Werkzeugmaschinen used German taxpayers' money to establish an ammunition factory in Sudan. In 1965, Sudan severed relations with the FRG and instead established diplomatic relations with the German Democratic Republic (GDR). Relations with the FRG were eventually resumed in 1971.

Omar al-Bashir's long rule in Sudan from 1989 to 2019 was marked by armed conflict and severe human rights abuses. During al-Bashir's reign, Germany suspended its development aid and technical assistance to the country. In 2005, Germany participated in the United Nations Mission in Sudan, and in 2013, the German government, in agreement with the rest of the international community, recognized South Sudan's independence.

In 2012, the German Embassy in Khartoum was stormed and set on fire by demonstrators. This was due to previous demonstrations in Germany by the far-right minor party Pro NRW, which had featured cartoons and depictions of Muhammad.

Protests began in Sudan in 2018, and dictator al-Bashir was eventually overthrown in a coup d'état in April 2019. The German government then committed to democratic change in the country, and Foreign Minister Heiko Maas and German President Frank-Walter Steinmeier visited the country soon after. Following the change of power in Sudan, a Sudan conference hosted by Germany in 2020 mobilized $1.8 billion in funding for the country's transformation. However, after another military coup d'état in Sudan in 2021, relations cooled again, and Germany suspended its development assistance.

== Economic relations ==
Economic relations between the two states are rather underdeveloped. The total volume of German trade with Sudan amounted to 128 million Euro in 2021, putting Sudan in 134th place in the ranking of German trading partners. Germany imports mainly cotton, rubber and foodstuffs from Sudan. In return, Sudan imports mainly industrial and chemical products from Germany. Occasionally, German companies are involved in projects in the country. For example, the German company Lahmeyer was involved in the construction of the Merowe Dam.

== Development cooperation ==
Germany does not provide direct bilateral development assistance to Sudan after development cooperation briefly resumed in 2019. However, Germany provides aid through European Union (EU) and United Nations (UN) programs and direct humanitarian assistance to refugees.

== Migration ==
There are sporadic applications for asylum from Sudanese in Germany. In 2021, there were approximately 8500 Sudanese living in Germany. Well-known German-Sudanese include television presenter and singer Nadja Abd el Farrag and football player Hany Mukhtar.

== Cultural relations ==
A Goethe-Institut has been active in Sudan again since 2008. German culture and science have a good reputation in Sudan and some Sudanese professionals have worked or studied in Germany. German has been offered as a foreign language at Sudanese universities since 1990, and the German Academic Exchange Service promotes exchange at the academic level. Close relations also exist between the Sudanese Antiquities Service and various German archaeological institutions. German experts are involved in the maintenance and conservation of important Sudanese cultural sites such as those in Naqa and Musawwarat es-Sufra.

== Diplomatic missions ==
- Due to the war in Sudan, Germany closed its embassy in Khartoum in 2023.
- Sudan has an embassy in Berlin.
