= Princess Marie Elisabeth of Saxe-Meiningen =

German princess (1853–1923)

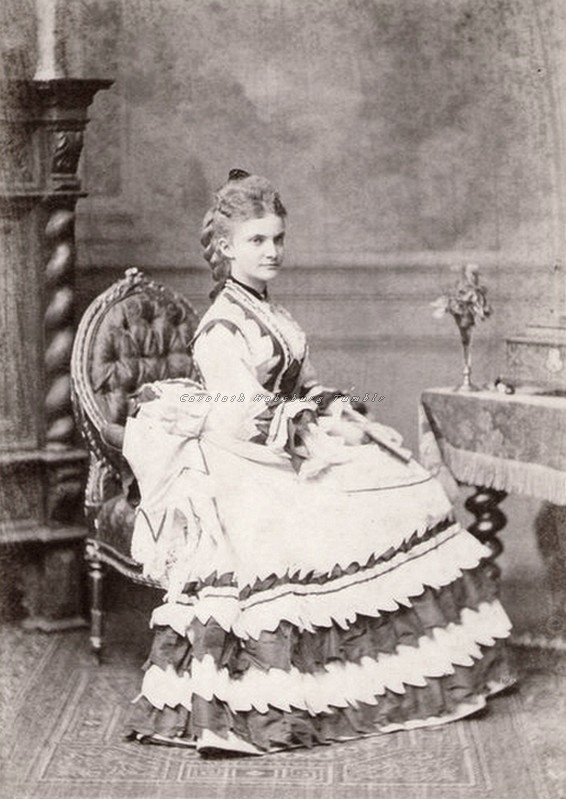
- Marie Elisabeth, mid 1870s
- Born: 23 September 1853; Potsdam, Province of Brandenburg, Kingdom of Prussia
- Died: 22 February 1923 (aged 69); Obersendling, Free State of Bavaria, Weimar Republic
- House: Saxe-Meiningen
- Father: Georg II, Duke of Saxe-Meiningen
- Mother: Princess Charlotte of Prussia

Princess Marie Elisabeth of Saxe-Meiningen (23 September 1853 – 22 February 1923) was the only daughter of George II, Duke of Saxe-Meiningen, by his first wife, Princess Charlotte of Prussia. She was notable as a musician and composer. One of her most famous works is Romanze in F major for clarinet and piano.

== Early life ==
Princess Marie Elisabeth was born on 23 September 1853 in Potsdam. She was the third child and only daughter of Georg, Hereditary Prince of Saxe-Meiningen, by his first wife, Princess Charlotte of Prussia, and had one surviving brother, Hereditary Prince Bernhard. Her parents' marriage was very happy, as it was the rare instance of a love match rather than a marriage of state. In 1855, tragedy struck with the death of their younger infant brother; Charlotte died three months later of complications after childbirth of a baby son, two months earlier. This youngest brother died, one day old. Georg was inconsolable, but remarried several years later to Princess Feodora of Hohenlohe-Langenburg in order to provide a mother for his remaining young children. Marie Elisabeth's father succeeded as Duke Georg II of Saxe-Meiningen in 1866. His second marriage was unhappy; it produced three younger brothers (Ernst, Friedrich, and Viktor) for Marie Elisabeth before Feodora's death in 1872.

Marie Elisabeth's father participated in the Franco-Prussian War, where he fought in nearly every battle. After the war, Georg II devoted himself to the stage, and his court became famous for its brilliance and culture. A year after Feodora's death, Georg II married for a third and last time to Ellen Franz, a stage actress. A happy marriage, together they founded the Meiningen Ensemble, which became the centre for dramatic art in Germany.

== Music ==
As her father was a great patron of the stage and the founder of a national theater, Marie Elisabeth was raised in this environment, consequently becoming artistic and a great lover of music like her parents. She received a thorough education under the tutelage of Theodor Kirchner, a talented pianist. Her father was a great patron of German composer and pianist Johannes Brahms, who worked as a music teacher in Meiningen for various pupils, including Marie Elisabeth, whom he gave piano lessons to. In addition to Brahms, Marie Elisabeth was in close contact with other famous musicians, such as Richard Strauss, Franz Mannstädt, and Hans von Bülow.

Marie Elisabeth was a student of the Conservatorium; she and Prince Alexander of Hesse, another royal pupil of Brahms, celebrated the birthday of musician Joachim Raff in Frankfurt in 1886. There, they interpreted Brahm's Sonata (Op. 78) for pianoforte and violin in a special feature for the ceremony. At the 1878 wedding of her elder brother Bernhard to Princess Charlotte of Prussia, eldest daughter of German Crown Prince Frederick William, Marie Elisabeth composed a piece of music specially meant for the occasion entitled torch dance.

As of 1913, Marie Elisabeth was the author of Einzugsmarsch for orchestra, Fackeltanz for piano as well as several other piano compositions. She also wrote a "pretty" Cradle Song for violin and piano, and, in 1892, she produced a Romanze in F major for clarinet and piano which had been influenced by Brahms' teachings. At her residence in Berchtesgaden, Marie Elisabeth received a regular circle of artists and encouraged talented singers by financing their education.

Marie Elisabeth died on 22 February 1923 in Obersendling. She never married, and is buried in the cemetery park in Meiningen.

== Ancestry ==
Ancestors of Princess Marie Elisabeth of Saxe-Meiningen

8. George I, Duke of Saxe-Meiningen
4. Bernard II, Duke of Saxe-Meiningen
9. Princess Louise Eleonore of Hohenlohe-Langenburg
2. George II, Duke of Saxe-Meiningen
10. William II, Elector of Hesse
5. Princess Marie Frederica of Hesse-Kassel
11. Princess Augusta of Prussia
1. Princess Marie Elisabeth of Saxe-Meiningen
12. Frederick William III of Prussia
6. Prince Albert of Prussia
13. Duchess Louise of Mecklenburg-Strelitz
3. Princess Charlotte of Prussia
14. William I of the Netherlands
7. Princess Marianne of the Netherlands
15. Princess Wilhelmine of Prussia
