= Princess Alexandrine of Prussia (1842–1906) =

Alexandrine of Prussia
- Duchess William of Mecklenburg-Schwerin
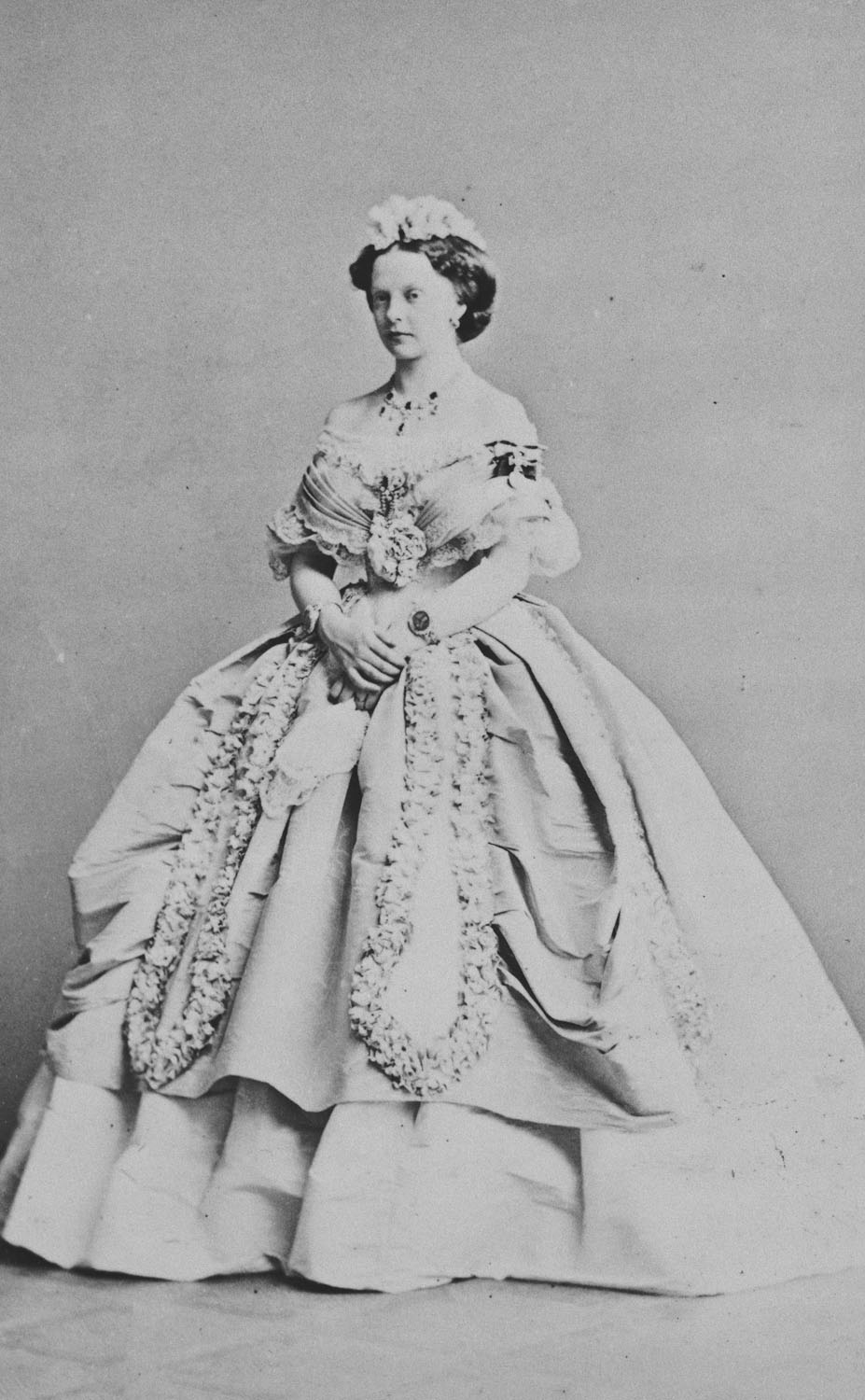
- Alexandrine in 1867
- Born: 1 February 1842; Berlin
- Died: 26 March 1906 (aged 64); Schloss Marley
- Spouse: Duke William of Mecklenburg-Schwerin (m. 1865; died 1879)
- Issue: Duchess Charlotte of Mecklenburg-Schwerin
Names
- Friederike Wilhelmine Luise Elisabeth Alexandrine
- House: Hohenzollern
- Father: Prince Albert of Prussia
- Mother: Princess Marianne of the Netherlands

Princess Friederike Wilhelmine Luise Elisabeth Alexandrine of Prussia (1 February 1842 – 26 March 1906) was a member of the House of Hohenzollern as the daughter of Prince Albert of Prussia and Princess Marianne of the Netherlands.

== Family and early life ==
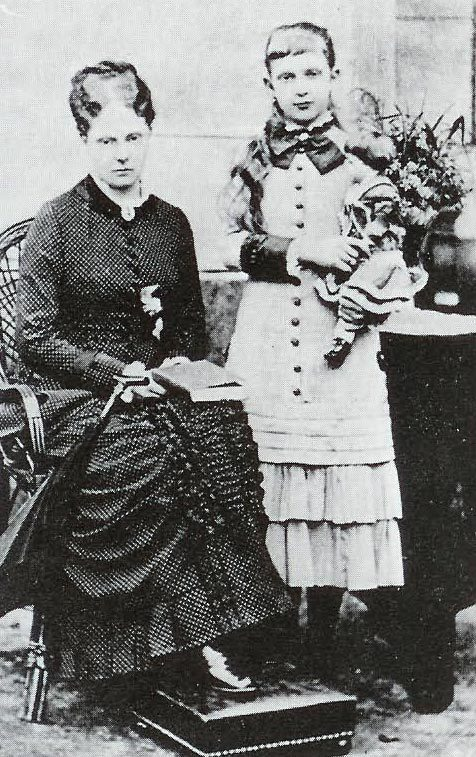
Alexandrine with her elder sister Charlotte (ca. 1853)

Alexandrine ('Addy') was the youngest child born to Prince Albert of Prussia and his first wife Princess Marianne of the Netherlands. She was named after her aunt (and later mother-in-law) the Grand Duchess of Mecklenburg-Schwerin. She had two older surviving siblings, Princess Charlotte and Prince Albert. Her parents' marriage was dissolved on 28 March 1849. Her father later remarried in 1853 to one of the court maids-of-honor, Rosalie von Rauch, who was created Countess of Hohenau. The couple had two sons. Their mother also remarried morganatically to a former coachman, producing issue with Johannes van Rossum.

Due to the troubled marriage of her parents, Alexandrine was to all intents and purposes the adopted daughter of her otherwise childless uncle and aunt, King Frederick William IV of Prussia and Queen Elisabeth Ludovika, and became their ward. They took Alexandrine to live with them, bringing her up as their own offspring.

== Marriage ==
=== Marriage prospects ===
As a young woman, Alexandrine was considered as a potential bride for the one-year older Albert Edward, Prince of Wales (the future Edward VII of the United Kingdom), but was not considered "clever or pretty" enough by his sister Crown Princess Victoria of Prussia (‘Vicky’). The prince married Alexandra of Denmark instead. Despite her comment, Vicky had a fondness for Alexandrine, writing to her mother that she was "such an excellent girl and much admired here". There were also financial advantages to a marriage to Alexandrine; she already had one million dollars through her mother, and would have even more wealth when she married. Consequently, Vicky tried again to marry her off to another British relative, Prince George, Duke of Cambridge. Nothing came of this either, however.

=== Wedding ===
On 9 December 1865, Alexandrine married her much-older cousin Duke William of Mecklenburg-Schwerin. He was a younger son of Paul Frederick, Grand Duke of Mecklenburg and Alexandrine's aunt and namesake Princess Alexandrine of Prussia. Though the marriage was meant to give her financial security in the future, it was certainly not a love match; Alexandrine cried during the entire wedding ceremony. Vicky described the wedding to her mother,

The wedding was celebrated with the greatest pomp, but had something of the solemnity of a funeral about it – nothing gay, festive or bridal. The only thing that made a pleasing impression on me was dear Addy herself, who although she cried the whole time, had such a dignified and touching appearance that I never saw her look so well. She went through it all with the most perfect tenue – though I never saw her smile once. She did not look a bit like a bride but I must say very elegant and distinguee... The bridegroom's tenance looked as evil as possible the whole time. I looked in vain for a trace of softness of feeling.

Furthermore, William had a reputation for drunkenness and a dissolute character, so it was surprising that the exceedingly pious and recently widowed Queen Elisabeth gave her consent to the match. On two occasions William had been deprived of his command in the Prussian army and had recently proposed marriage to the celebrated ballerina Marie Taglioni; consequently he was generally considered to be the "black sheep" of the family. Regardless, the Queen granted her permission, endowing her with a grand trousseau of lavish clothing and jewelry. Her other uncle Emperor Wilhelm I gave her an opulent diamond necklace, while her mother Princess Marianne gave her a necklace of Siberian amethysts as well as an emerald diadem.

=== Marriage and later life ===
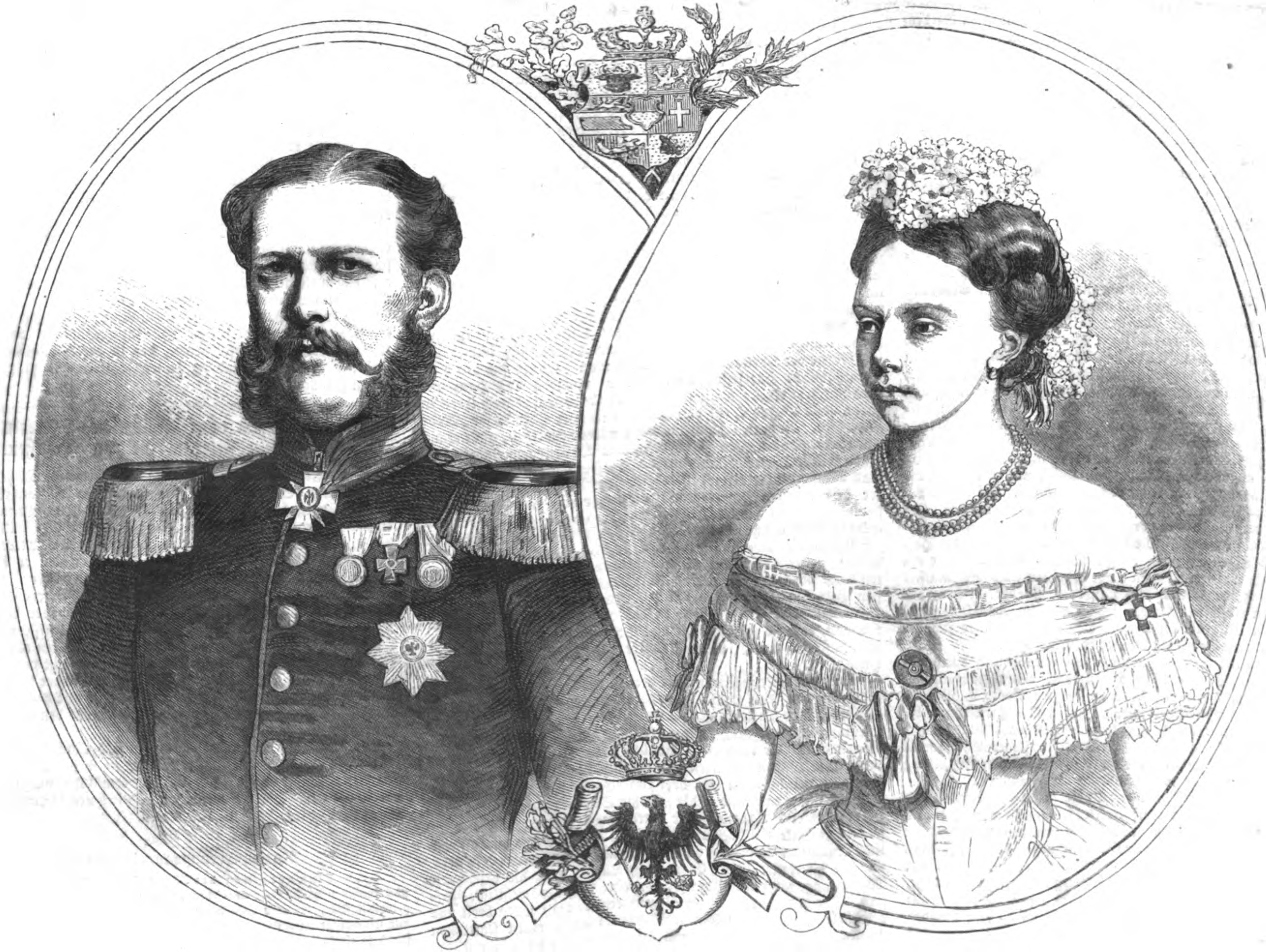
Illustration of Alexandrine pictured with her husband, Duke William, 1865

William's older brother Frederick Francis already had many children from his two marriages, so there was no chance of William and Alexandrine succeeding to the throne of Mecklenburg-Schwerin. During their marriage, the couple lived at Bellevue Palace in Berlin; Alexandrine saw little of Mecklenburg, her husband's native country. The marriage was unhappy, and she tried to escape several times, only to be forced back by pressure from her powerful Aunt Alexandrine. William managed with difficulty to secure an unimportant command in the Prussian army during the Franco-Prussian War. He was badly injured from an explosion during the war, but continued to live on until 1879.

After her husband's death, Alexandrine dedicated her life to her daughter, and played very little part in public life. Alexandrine died on 26 March 1906 at Schloss Marley, near Potsdam, Brandenburg, Germany. Bellevue Palace was next occupied by Prince Eitel Friedrich of Prussia and his new bride Duchess Sophia Charlotte of Oldenburg.

== Issue ==
By her husband, she had an only daughter:

- Duchess Charlotte of Mecklenburg-Schwerin (7 November 1868 – 20 December 1944). She married firstly Henry XVII of Reuss-Köstritz and secondly Robert Schmidt. She had three sons from her first marriage.
  - Heinrich XXXVII Reuß zu Köstritz (1888–1964)
  - Heinrich XXXVIII Reuß zu Köstritz (1889–1918)
  - Heinrich XLII Reuß zu Köstritz (1892–1949)

== Ancestry ==
Ancestors of Princess Alexandrine of Prussia (1842–1906)

8. Frederick William II of Prussia (= 14)
4. Frederick William III of Prussia
9. Princess Frederica Louisa of Hesse-Darmstadt (= 15)
2. Prince Albert of Prussia
10. Charles II, Grand Duke of Mecklenburg-Strelitz
5. Duchess Louise of Mecklenburg-Strelitz
11. Princess Friederike of Hesse-Darmstadt
1. Princess Alexandrine of Prussia
12. William V, Prince of Orange
6. William I of the Netherlands
13. Princess Wilhelmina of Prussia
3. Princess Marianne of the Netherlands
14. Frederick William II of Prussia (= 8)
7. Princess Wilhelmine of Prussia
15. Princess Frederica Louisa of Hesse-Darmstadt (= 9)
