= Princess Charlotte of Prussia (1831–1855) =

Charlotte of Prussia
- Hereditary Princess of Saxe-Meiningen
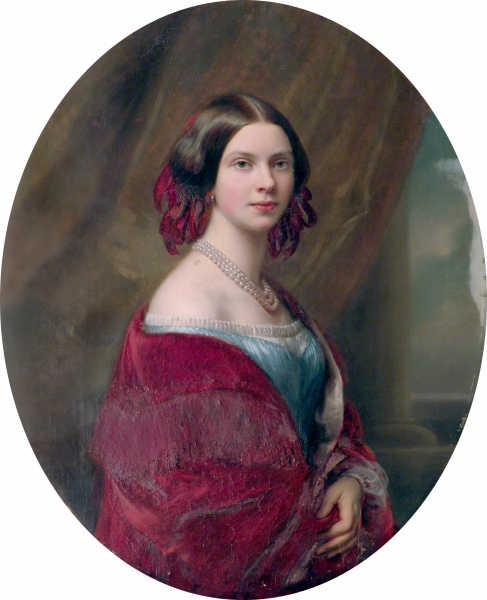
- Born: 21 June 1831; Schönhausen Palace, Berlin
- Died: 30 March 1855 (aged 23); Meiningen
- Burial: English Garden, Meiningen, Thuringia, Germany
- Spouse: Georg, Hereditary Prince of Saxe-Meiningen (m. 1850)
- Issue: Bernhard III, Duke of Saxe-Meiningen; Prince Georg Albrecht; Princess Marie Elisabeth
Names
- German: Friederike Luise Wilhelmine Marianne Charlotte
- House: Hohenzollern
- Father: Prince Albrecht of Prussia
- Mother: Princess Marianne of the Netherlands

Princess Charlotte of Prussia (21 June 1831 – 30 March 1855) was, by birth, the Princess of Prussia and a member of the House of Hohenzollern. By marriage, she became Hereditary Princess of Saxe-Meiningen.

== Life ==
=== Family and early years ===
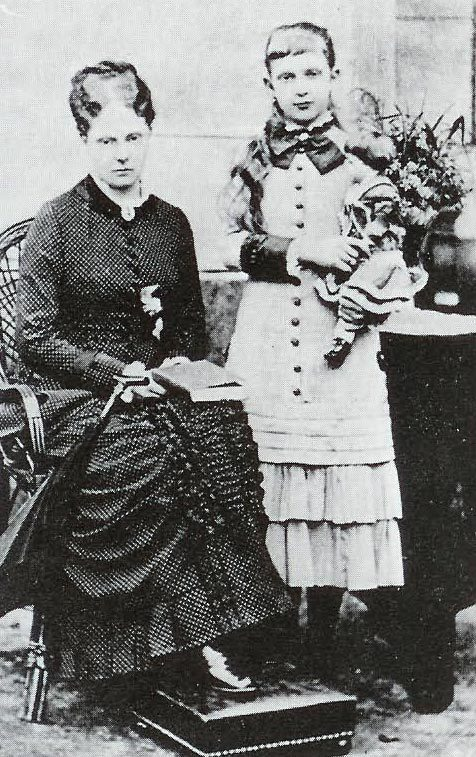
Charlotte (left) and her younger sister Alexandrine (ca. 1853)

Her parents' marriage was unhappy due to Prince Albert's several affairs, and finally was dissolved on 28 March 1849, after which Princess Marianne began to live with her former coachman Johannes van Rossum, with whom she had a son, Johannes William of Reinhartshausen.

The custody of Charlotte and her two surviving siblings Albert and Alexandrine was given to their father; however, their childless aunt Queen Elisabeth Ludovika took care of them, moreover after Prince Albert's second and morganatic marriage in 1853 with Rosalie von Rauch, who bore him two sons, Count William and Count Frederick of Hohenau.

=== Marriage ===
As a young woman, Charlotte was highly eligible due to her Dutch fortune and Hohenzollern connections. In Charlottenburg on 18 May 1850, the 18-year-old princess married Georg, Hereditary Prince of Saxe-Meiningen, who was 24 years old. The only son of Bernhard II, Duke of Saxe-Meiningen and Princess Marie of Hesse-Kassel, he had led a battalion from Meiningen in support of the Prussians in the First Schleswig War in 1849. After resuming his military career in Berlin, Georg soon became engaged to Charlotte, whose position as a niece of Frederick William IV of Prussia surely recommended her to him. It was a love match and their marriage occurred after a short engagement. Among the wedding gifts was an opulent old villa on Lake Como from her mother, Marianne, as well as a substantial collection of paintings and sculptures. It was renamed the Villa Carlotta in the bride's honour. Due to their Prussian connections, the couple spent the next five years in Berlin and Potsdam but returned to Meiningen for the birth of their children.

The couple shared many interests, particularly with the theatre, as they were both ardent attendees; during their engagement, they had even acted in amateur court theatricals together. They had four children. Charlotte had a talent for music, and was taught by the likes of Wilhelm Taubert, Theodor Kullak and Julius Stern in her youth. She wrote a number of military marches, songs and piano pieces. Her daughter, Princess Marie Elisabeth, would inherit these interests.

=== Death ===
On 27 January 1855, their second son, Georg, died. Charlotte followed him two months later, dying of childbirth complications on 30 March at the age of 23. Georg was inconsolable, but would eventually remarry to Princess Feodora of Hohenlohe-Langenburg in order to provide a mother to his remaining children. He succeeded his father as Duke of Saxe-Meiningen in 1866, ten years after Charlotte's death.

=== Issue ===
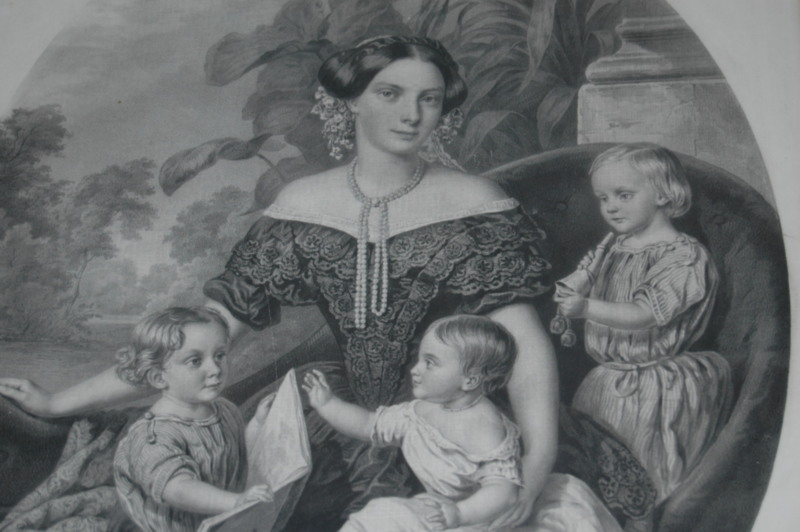
Charlotte, Hereditary Princess of Saxe-Meiningen and her three children

- Bernhard III, Duke of Saxe-Meiningen (1 April 1851 - 16 January 1928); married Princess Charlotte of Prussia and had issue.
- Prince Georg Albrecht (12 April 1852 - 27 January 1855); died in infancy.
- Princess Marie Elisabeth (23 September 1853 - 22 February 1923); died unmarried.
- An unnamed son (29 March 1855 - 30 March 1855).

== Ancestry ==
Ancestors of Princess Charlotte of Prussia (1831–1855)

8. Frederick William II of Prussia (= 14)
4. Frederick William III of Prussia
9. Landgravine Frederika Louisa of Hesse-Darmstadt (= 15)
2. Prince Albert of Prussia
10. Charles II, Grand Duke of Mecklenburg-Strelitz
5. Duchess Louise of Mecklenburg-Strelitz
11. Princess Friederike of Hesse-Darmstadt
1. Princess Charlotte of Prussia
12. William V, Prince of Orange
6. William I of the Netherlands
13. Princess Wilhelmina of Prussia
3. Princess Marianne of the Netherlands
14. Frederick William II of Prussia (= 8)
7. Princess Wilhelmine of Prussia
15. Landgravine Frederika Louisa of Hesse-Darmstadt (= 9)
