= Princess Marianne of the Netherlands =

Princess Albert of Prussia (1810–1883)

Marianne of the Netherlands
- Princess Albert of Prussia
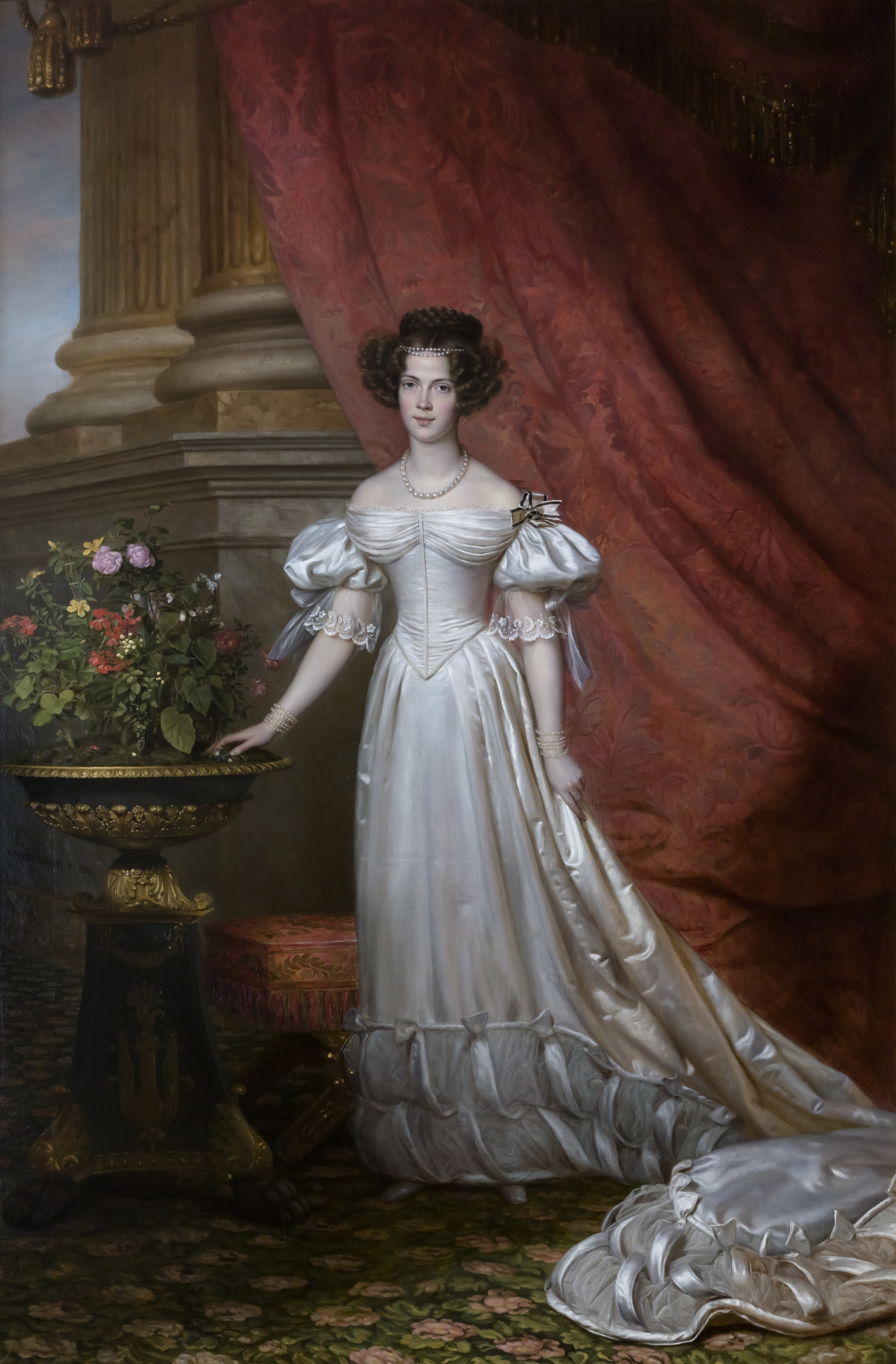
- Portrait, 1834
- Born: 9 May 1810; Dutch Palace, Berlin, Kingdom of Prussia
- Died: 29 May 1883 (aged 73); Reinharthausen Palace, Erbach, Grand Duchy of Hesse
- Spouses: Prince Albert of Prussia (m. 1830; div. 1849) Johannes van Rossum (partner; 1848; d. 1873)
- Issue: Charlotte, Hereditary Princess of Saxe-Meiningen; Prince Albert; Princess Elizabeth; Alexandrine, Duchess William of Mecklenburg-Schwerin; Johannes Wilhelm von Reinhartshausen
Names
- Wilhelmina Frederika Louise Charlotte Marianne
- House: Orange-Nassau
- Father: William I of the Netherlands
- Mother: Princess Wilhelmine of Prussia

Princess Marianne of the Netherlands, Princess of Orange-Nassau (Wilhelmina Frederika Louise Charlotte Marianne; 9 May 1810 – 29 May 1883) was the youngest child of King William I of the Netherlands and Princess Wilhelmine of Prussia.

Princess Marianne was a woman who thought and lived very unconventionally for her time because she had left her unfaithful husband Prince Albert of Prussia and had an illegitimate son (whom she openly recognized) with her partner Johannes van Rossum, with whom she also lived in a common-law marriage. She was banished from the Kingdom of Prussia.

An art collector and patron, she made her new residence, Schloss Reinhartshausen in Erbach, on the Rhine. Through her social commitment to the needy, especially in the Rheingau and Silesia, she gained sympathy among the population. The Johanneskirche in Erbach, which was founded by Marianne after the death of her 12-year-old illegitimate son, is linked to her fate. This church is a cultural monument and was the first Protestant church in the Rheingau.

== Early life ==
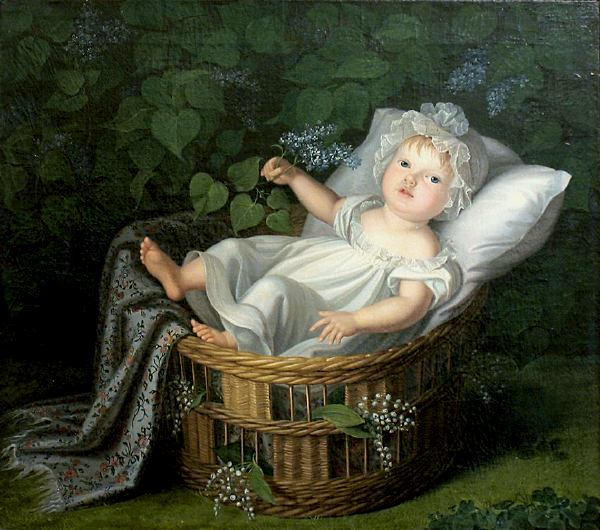
Princess Marianne, 1811

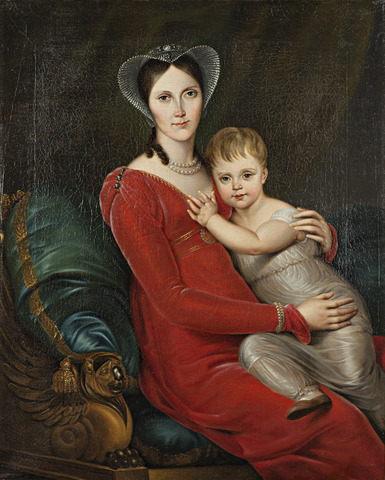
Queen Wilhelmine of the Netherlands with her daughter Princess Marianne, ca. 1815

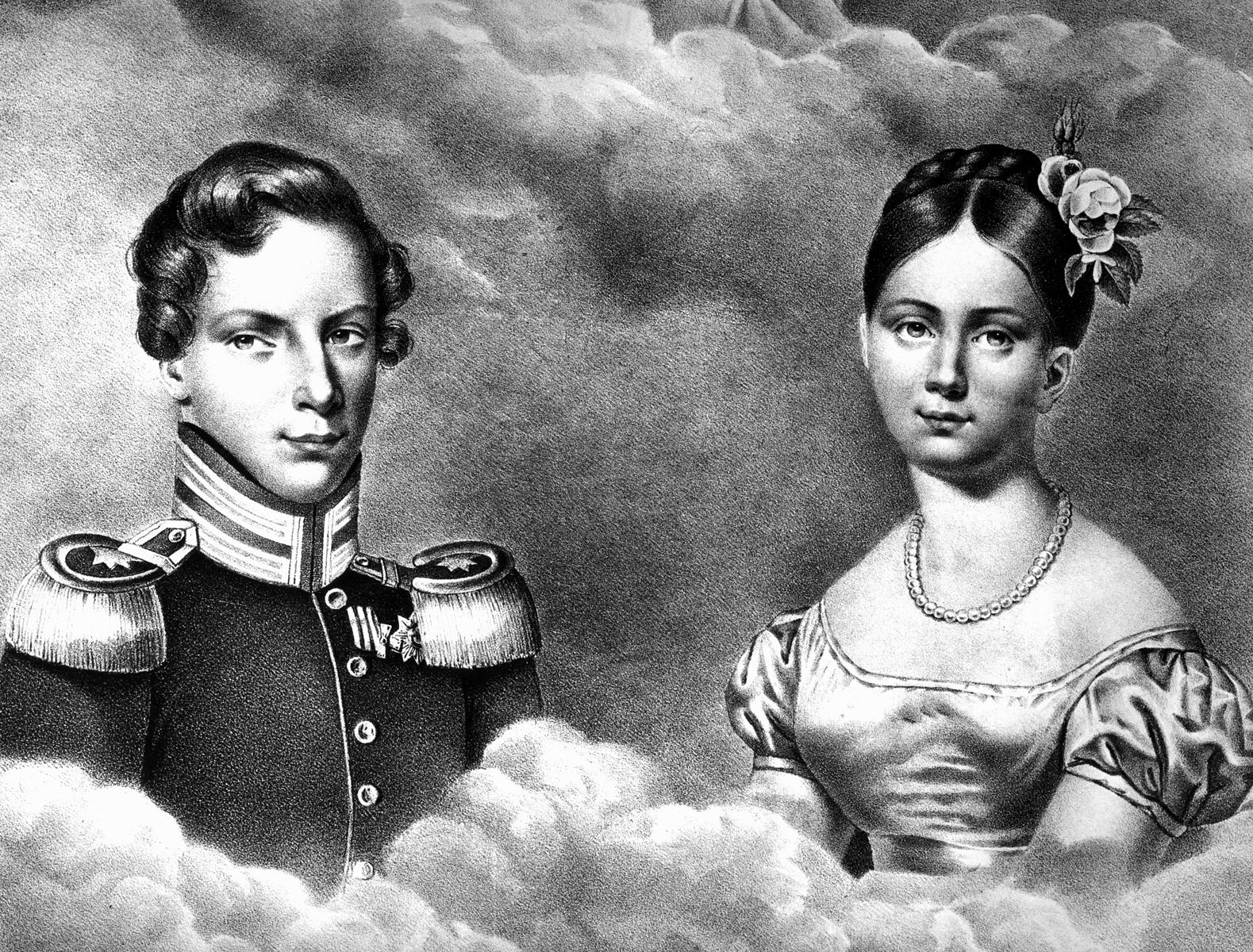
Prince Albert of Prussia and Princess Marianne

Born in Berlin, Marianne was the youngest child and second daughter of Prince William Frederick of Orange-Nassau and his wife Wilhelmine of Prussia. Her elder sister Pauline had died long before her birth, so Marianne became the only daughter of her parents to survive to adulthood. Her two older brothers were Prince William Frederick George Louis (future King William II of the Netherlands) and Prince William Frederik Charles. Two other brothers were stillborn on 18 August 1795 and 30 August 1806, respectively.

After France had conquered the Netherlands in 1795, Prince William and his family fled first to Great Britain and later to his father-in-law's court in Berlin. Marianne was born there on 9 May 1810 as the Nesthäkchen (Baby of the Family) in the Niederländisches Palais, named after her maternal aunt-by-marriage Princess William of Prussia. Her baptism took place twenty-two days later, on 31 May, with her older brother William Frederick as one of her godparents.

When their homeland was liberated from Napoleonic rule in 1813, the exile finally came to an end. Marianne's father had landed on the beach of Scheveningen on 30 November 1813 and some time later Marianne came to The Hague with her mother and her nanny Bonninck. The family temporarily lived in the Huis Huguetan at 34 Lange Voorhout, and after the Noordeinde Palace and the Huis ten Bosch were refurnished, they moved there. The summer months were spent at the Het Loo Palace in Apeldoorn. On 30 March 1814, her father was inaugurated as Sovereign of the Netherlands in the Nieuwe Kerk in Amsterdam. By the Congress of Vienna, Belgium was annexed to the Netherlands and on 21 September 1815, William I was inaugurated as King in Brussels. As the new King and Queen of the Netherlands and Belgium, her parents had little time for their daughter; this distant and non-authoritarian upbringing was decisive in Marianne's character. They appointed a governess from a noble circle, Countess Jacoba Bentinck, married to the Lord of Middachten. She was strict with Marianne and arranged her princely education, including lessons from the home teacher Catharina van Ulft. Although she received lessons in foreign languages, her mastering of them are poor, and she spoke a mixture of German and French, and hardly any Dutch.

In 1828 she was betrothed to Gustav, former Crown Prince of Sweden, and the bride and groom evidently had true feelings for each other. But the son of a dethroned king caused a diplomatic row with the new Bernadotte king of Sweden and was not considered befitting, and the engagement was broken off in 1829.

== Marriage with Prince Albert of Prussia ==
In Noordeinde Palace at The Hague on 14 September 1830, Marianne married her first cousin Prince Albert, the fourth son of her mother's brother, King Frederick William III of Prussia. The couple lived in Berlin, initially in Schönhausen Palace in Pankow, and from 1832 in the Prinz-Albrecht-Palais in Friedrichstadt, built by Karl Friedrich Schinkel; Marianne also bought the Schloss Kamenz in 1838 for her family in the village of Kamieniec Ząbkowicki, Lower Silesia, in southwestern Poland. The union produced five children, of whom three survived to adulthood: Charlotte (1831–1855; by marriage Hereditary Princess of Saxe-Meiningen), Albert (1837–1906) and Alexandrine (1842–1906; by marriage Duchess William of Mecklenburg-Schwerin).

However, soon the marriage became unhappy: the sensitive, deeply religious, artistically and socially interested Marianne and the militarily educated, Prussian drill-loving Albert did not match each other's characters; he was also prone to extramarital adventures. Marianne did not want to accept this without complaint and, as was expected at the time, to keep quiet for the sake of form. In 1845, after she found that Albert began a love affair with her own lady-in-waiting Rosalie von Rauch (the daughter of the Prussian Minister of War Gustav von Rauch), Marianne finally left him and moved to the town of Voorburg, located in the west part of the province of South Holland, Netherlands. She asked for a divorce, but neither the Prussian nor the Dutch court gave their approval. Thereupon she traveled through Europe or stayed on her estates in Italy, Silesia and the Netherlands; despite this, at least until 1848 Marianne tried to reach a reconciliation with her husband, without success.

== Union with Johannes van Rossum ==
Johannes van Rossum (by Jan Philip Koelman, 1852)

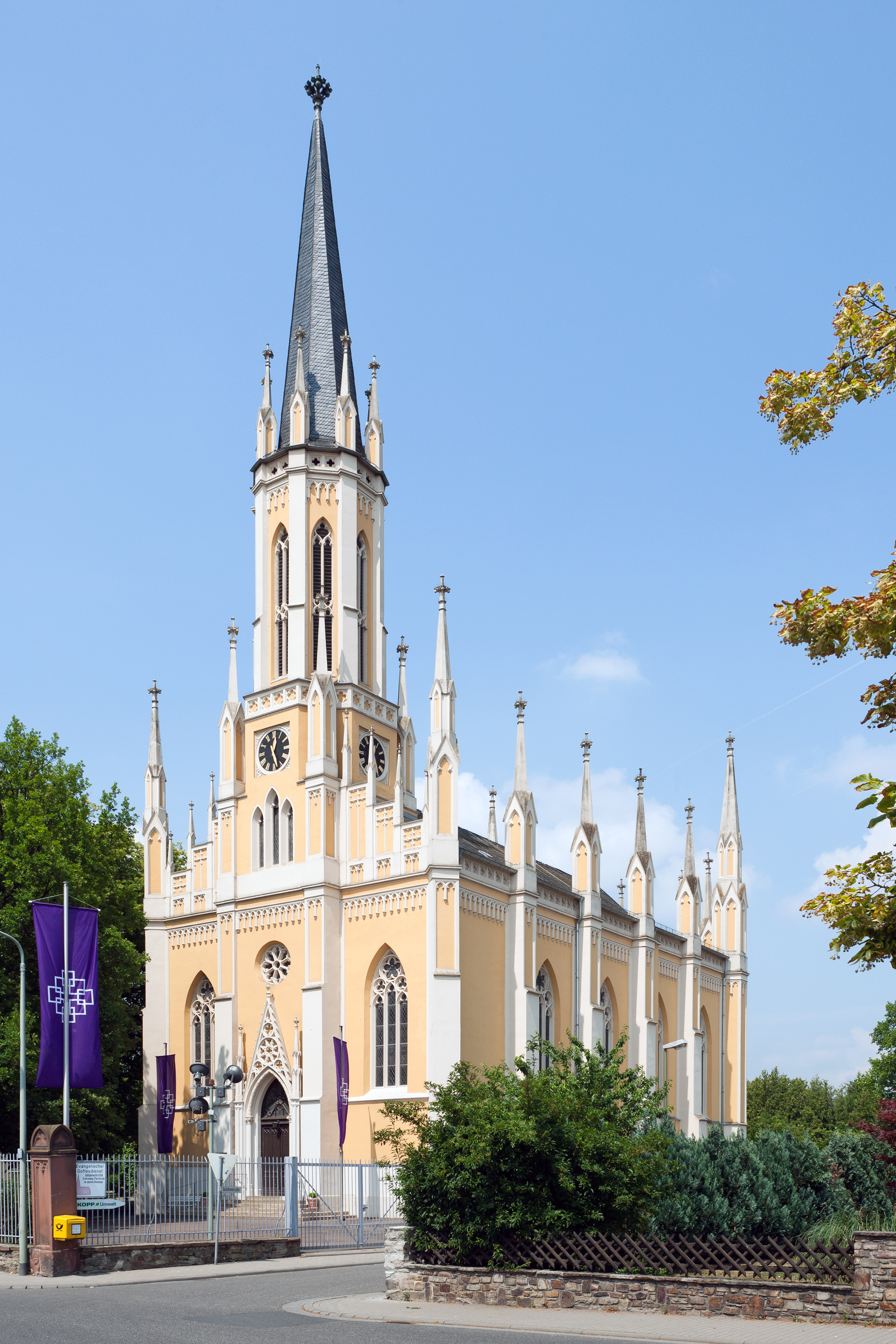
The Johanneskirche as seen from the southeast, 2011

On 7 March 1848 Marianne bought the Rusthof estate Buitenplaats Rusthof in Voorburg and settled there with her lover, the already married Johannes van Rossum, who was her personal coachman; he also became her travel companion and later cabinet secretary. In doing so, she violated the principles of her class and provoked a scandal. When it was found that she was expecting a child from van Rossum, in order to prevent an even bigger scandal, both courts of The Hague and Berlin finally gave their permission for the divorce that Marianne and Albert had longed for. On 28 March 1849, the divorce was officially pronounced, and on 30 October Marianne gave birth to a son, Johannes Wilhelm von Reinhartshausen in Cefalù, during one of her trips to Sicily. The courts of The Hague and Berlin then broke off all contact with Marianne: in the Kingdom of Prussia, there was even an official exile decree that allowed her to stay on Prussian soil for only 24 hours at a time.

The upbringing of her children from her marriage to Albert was also withdrawn from her; the guardianship passed to Queen Elisabeth of Prussia. Soon after the birth of their son, she traveled with Johannes van Rossum through Europe and the Orient (Egypt, Palestine, Syria) before finally settling in Rome in 1851 at the Villa Celimontana, which she had bought and where she brought her son to live with her and van Rossum. With her decision to raise her illegitimate child herself and not, as is customary in the aristocracy, to silently give it into the hands of someone else as a "misstep", she once again attracted the disapproval of the royal families. Marianne and van Rossum never married but lived together, although a morganatic marriage would have been possible after the death of van Rossum's wife Catharina Wilhelmina Keijzer in 1861.

== Mother and entrepreneur ==
For Marianne, the banishment decree meant that she could only meet her children (and later grandchildren), with whom she remained closely connected throughout her life, outside of Prussia or during a 24-hour stay. The encounters therefore took place on Marianne's estates in the Netherlands and Italy or in the Weißwasser Castle near Jauernig, which she acquired in 1853, right behind the Prussian border. From here she was quickly in Prussia, and could also reach her goods in Silesia, and continue to take care of their management and administration.

Marianne was a clever entrepreneur who increased her possessions in the course of her life and made her descendants the richest branch of the Hohenzollern dynasty. In 1843, she bought the Villa Sommariva in Tremezzo on Lake Como in Northern Italy for 780,000 lira to her former owner Emilia Sommariva, and in 1850 she gave it as a present to her eldest daughter Charlotte on occasion to her wedding to the Hereditary Duke of Saxe-Meiningen, being renamed Villa Carlotta; Charlotte enjoyed the villa for only a few years before dying in 1855 at the age of 23 of complications from childbirth. The Schloss Kamenz in Silesia was the wedding present for her son Albert. At her children's weddings, as at all family celebrations, she was not tolerated throughout her life. Despite the family and social ostracism, Marianne never hid her love partner and their illegitimate child. She also appeared with them at public events.

== A new home in the Rheingau ==
In search of permanent residence near the Prussian border, which would make it easier for her to visit her children, Marianne moved back from Italy to her homeland in 1855. She acquired Schloss Reinhartshausen in Erbach in the Duchy of Nassau, near the Westerwald headquarters of her Orange-Nassau dynasty (Laurenberg, Nassau, Dillenburg, Diez). Here she settled with Johannes van Rossum and their son. It was to remain her residence until her death.

=== Patronage ===
An unusually progressive woman and cultural visionary, Marianne made the Schloss Reinhartshausen a cultural center of the Rhine. Marianne reconstructed part of the Schloss as a museum to house her art collection, probably consisting of more than 600 paintings, graphics and numerous marble statues, most of which she had brought with her from Rome. The museum is known today as the Festsäle. The Schloss was always vibrant with many guests and Marianne encouraged young artists providing them accommodation and patronage. Of her art collection, only 180 paintings, 110 drawings including watercolors and gouaches, as well as various sculptures can be found in the Schloss Reinhartshausen today: some statues in the castle garden and in the garden of the rectory of the Johanneskirche in Erbach, most of which was distributed in her family and probably sold. In 1932 there was also an auction in Berlin.

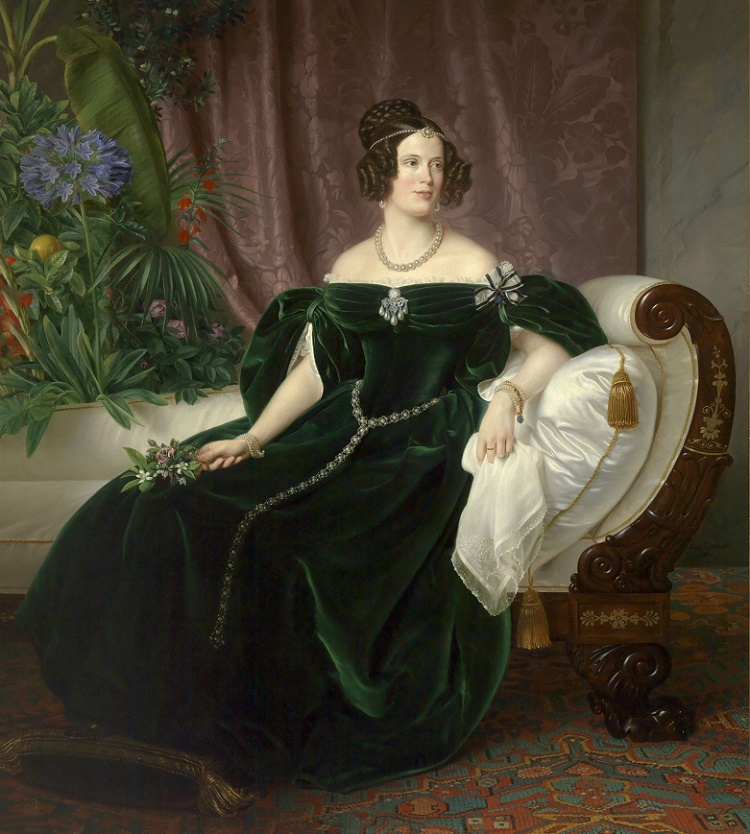
(Portrait by Theodor Hildebrandt, 1837)

In 1872 in the name of her father King William I, she donated almost two thirds of the constructions costs to Dillenburg to help finance the creation of a new lookout tower, the Wilhelmsturm, to commemorate her ancestor William the Silent who received the envoys from the Low Countries at his home on this spot asking him to take the lead in their rebellion against the Spanish Netherlands.

==== Foundation of the Johanneskirche in Erbach ====
Johannes Wilhelm von Reinhartshausen, the son of Princess Marianne and Johannes van Rossum

Marianne and van Rossum had their son raised in a civil society, he was supposed to become a theologian or lawyer. From October 1861 onward, Johannes Wilhelm von Reinhartshausen was no longer taught by private tutors, but attended a boarding school in nearby Dauborn. But during the holidays he fell ill with scarlet fever at home and died surprisingly on Christmas Day of 1861.

The deeply religious Protestant Marianne gave the community of Erbach a piece of land and 60,000 guilders for the construction of the first Protestant church in the Rheingau on the evening of the day he died, including the clergy house. In doing so, she fulfilled her son's wish for his own place of worship for Protestant Christians in the Rheingau, which he had expressed a few weeks before his death.

The builder of the church was Eduard Zais, son of the famous Nassau master builder Christian Zais. Marianne's son was finally buried in the crypt behind the altar of this church, which was solemnly inaugurated in 1865. A small angel figure by the Dutch sculptor Johann Heinrich Stöver commissioned by her adorns his sarcophagus. Stöver also created three Carrara marble statues based on motifs by the Danish sculptor Bertel Thorvaldsen, which were placed in the chancel and symbolize faith, love and hope. In honor of the apostle Johannes and in memory of Johannes Wilhelm, the church was named Johanneskirche.

== Social engagement ==
Marianne supported social and church institutions into old age. She was extremely popular not only in the Rheingau because of her great social commitment. She financed the pastoral office of the Johanneskirche, she founded and improved the pastor's salary, supported the needy in the parishes of both denominations ("everyone is equal before God") as well as the school in Erbach and the Wiesbaden institution for the blind. In Silesia she supported widows' funds, orphanages, hospitals and also here the construction of a Protestant church with a rectory.

== Later years and death ==
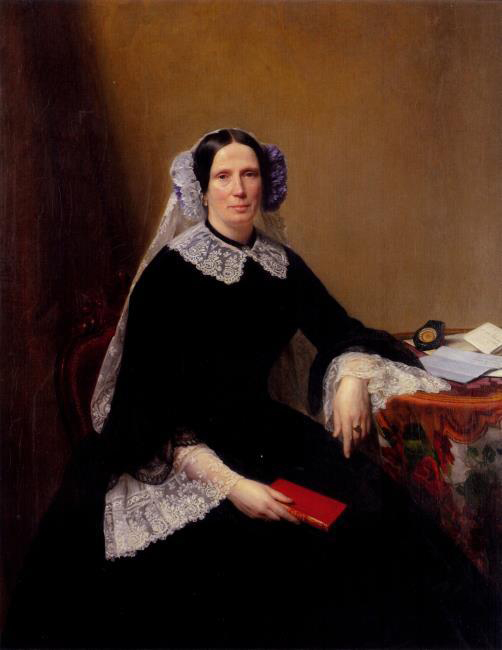
Marianne painted in her 50s by Herman Antonie de Bloeme, c. 1860

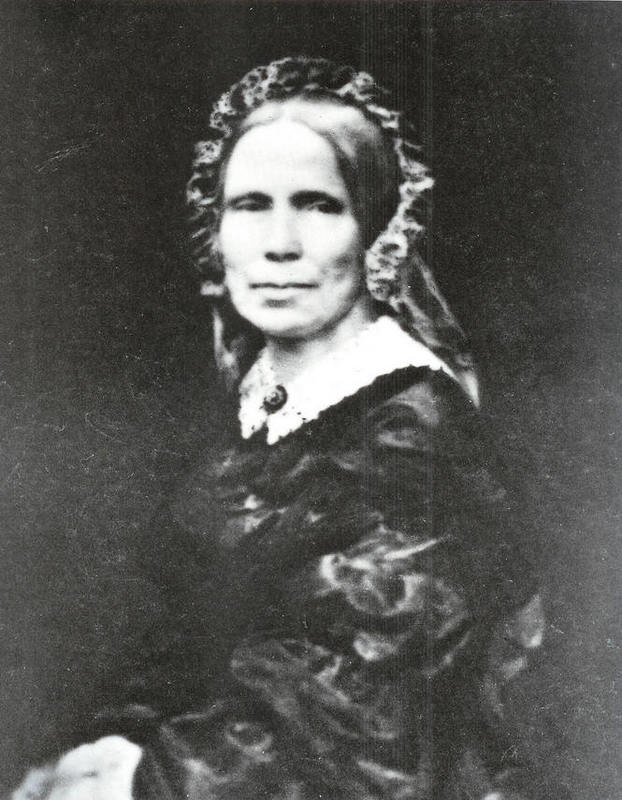
Photograph of Marianne, c. 1870s

On 10 May 1873 Johannes van Rossum, Marianne's partner for 25 years and the love of her life, died from comsumpition aged 63 at Schloss Reinhartshausen. Although Marianne had reserved space for two more graves next to her son in the deed of foundation of the Johanneskirche, for herself and van Rossum, at the end van Rossum was buried on 14 April in the public cemetery of Erbach, as was noted in the church book of the Johanneskirche; there had been arguments with the pastor, as recorded in the pastor's wife's memoir. It may be assumed that he was annoyed by the unconventional life of the couple and therefore denied the burial of van Rossum in the church crypt. Marianne then ordered in 1876 to be buried there as well, in a simple oak coffin side by side with her partner. She appointed her son Prince Albert of Prussia as executor of her last will.

Marianne survived van Rossum by ten years and died in the Schloss Reinhartshausen in Erbach on 29 May 1883, 20 days after her 73rd birthday; as was previously determined by her, she was buried next to her partner in the public cemetery of Erbach. Just as previously commissioned for her son's grave, a work made by the Dutch sculptor Johann Heinrich Stöver was made for van Rossum's grave, a blessing statue of Christ made of Carrara marble, again based on a figure by the Danish sculptor Bertel Thorvaldsen. To this day it adorns the joint grave of Marianne and van Rossum in the Erbach cemetery. The base of the Christ statue with the inscriptions from the Gospel of John, the decorated grave border made of Lahn marble and the grave slab with inscription were made by Josef Leonhard (1833–1901), offspring of the renowned Nassau sculptor dynasty Leonhard from the marble metropolis of Villmar on the Lahn. He was apprenticed to the famous Wiesbaden sculptor Emil Hopfgarten and in 1856 he opened a studio in Eltville am Rhein, which still exists today.

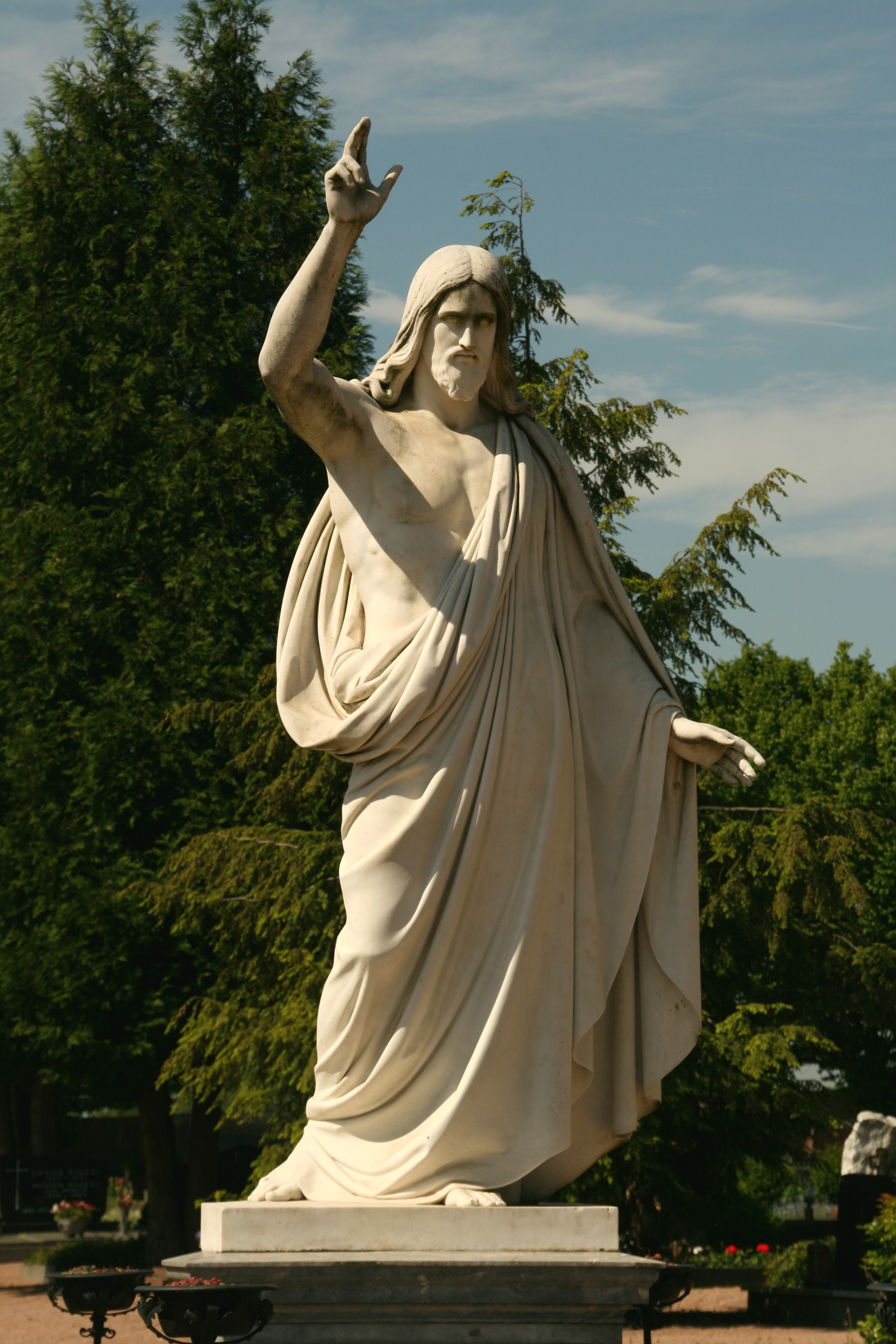
Christ figure by Johann Heinrich Stöver on Marianne's grave in Erbach cemetery

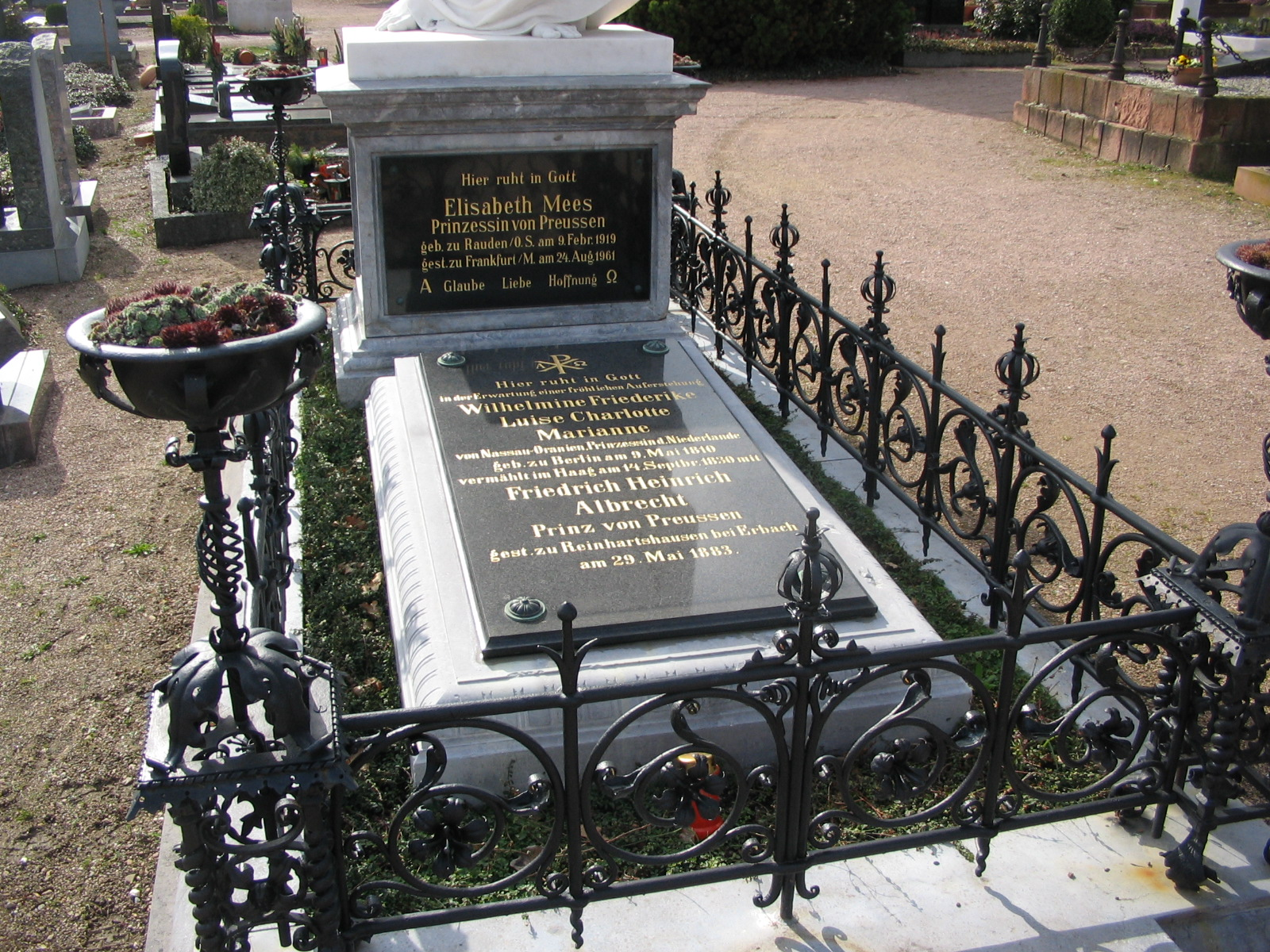
Gravestone of Marianne in Erbach cemetery

Johannes van Rossum is not mentioned on the grave slab of the joint grave with Marianne. It is not known whether he was buried anonymously or whether his grave slab had to give way to Marianne's 10 years later. However, reference is made to Marianne's marriage to Prince Albert of Prussia, from whom she had been divorced since 1849 and who was morganatically married to Rosalie von Rauch from 1853 until his death in 1872. The inscription on Marianne's grave slab reads:

Hier ruht in Gott
in der Erwartung einer fröhlichen Auferstehung
Wilhelmine Friederike
Luise Charlotte
Marianne
von Nassau Oranien, Prinzessin der Niederlande
geb. zu Berlin am 9. Mai 1810
vermählt im Haag am 14. Septbr. 1830 mit
Friedrich Heinrich
Albrecht
Prinz von Preussen
gest. zu Reinhartshausen bei Erbach

Whose roughly translation in English is: Here in God rests in the expectation of a happy resurrection Wilhelmine Friederike Luise Charlotte Marianne of Nassau Orange, Princess of the Netherlands, born in Berlin on May 9, 1810, married in The Hague on September 14. 1830 with Friedrich Heinrich Albrecht Prince of Prussia died at Reinhartshausen near Erbach. A second grave slab on the base of the Christ statue mentions Elisabeth Mees, born Princess of Prussia and great-granddaughter of Marianne, who died in 1961 at the age of 42 and was buried there.

== Honors ==
- In 1896 the river island in front of Schloss Reinhartshausen was renamed Mariannenaue in her honor on the initiative of the then owner of the island, Marianne's son Prince Albert of Prussia (1837–1906). It is the largest Rhine island on the Middle Rhine between Erbach and Hattenheim.
- Marianne's 200th birthday in 2010 was used by Schloss Reinhartshausen and the local evangelical parish Triangelis (Eltville, Erbach, Kiedrich) as an opportunity for festive events in which her life and work were honored.
- On the Reformation Day weekend in 2015, the Johanneskirche was reopened after 10 months of renovation work with a glamorous festival program of church services and concerts. At the same time, their 150th anniversary was celebrated and the founder was remembered.
- Adrian Diel, German doctor and founder of pomology, put a pear named Prinzessin Marianne after the young princess in 1818, probably on the wave of enthusiasm after the creation of the United Kingdom of the Netherlands in 1815 under the rule of the House of Orange-Nassau.

== Bibliography ==
- de Wit, Jos (2016). "Prinzessin Marianne von Oranien-Nassau und ihre Beziehungen zur Grafschaft Glatz". AGG-Mitteilungen (in German). No. 15. pp. 31–40.
- Dopatka, Annette (2003). Marianne von Preußen. Prinzessin der Niederlande. Leben und Wirken einer selbstbewußten Frau, für die Schloss Reinhartshausen im Rheingau zum Lebensmittelpunkt wurde (in German). Oberursel.
- Feuerstein, Volker (13 September 2008). "Das Schloss der verbannten Prinzessin". Fuldaer Zeitung (in German): 26.
- Heinemann, Hartmut (2002). "Prinzessin Marianne der Niederlande (1810-1883) und der Rheingau. Eine Frau zwischen Tradition und Emanzipation". Rheingau-Forum (in German). Vol. 11, no. 2. pp. 1–11.
- Pieken, Gorch; Kruse, Cornelia (2007). Preußisches Liebesglück (in German). Berlin: Propyläen Verlag. ISBN 978-3-549-07337-7.
- Puhe, Ferdinand (2000). "Von Kamenz nach Reinhartshausen. Die Hohenzollern in Schlesien und im Rheingau". Rheingau-Forum (in German). Vol. 9, no. 2. pp. 22–31.
- Renkhoff, Otto (1992). Nassauische Biographie (in German). Historische Kommission für Nassau. ISBN 978-3922244905. 2nd edition; N° 3404.
- Schiller, Gerhard (2010a). "Marianne von Preußen, Prinzessin der Niederlande. Erinnerungen an das Leben der selbstbewussten Prinzessin in Berlin, Kamenz, Weißwasser und dem Rheingau. 1. Teil". Schlesien heute (in German). No. 5.
- Schiller, Gerhard (2010b). "Marianne von Preußen, Prinzessin der Niederlande. Erinnerungen an das Leben der selbstbewussten Prinzessin in Berlin, Kamenz, Weißwasser und dem Rheingau. 2. Teil". Schlesien heute (in German). No. 8.
