= August Sabac el Cher =

19th-century Afro-German court official

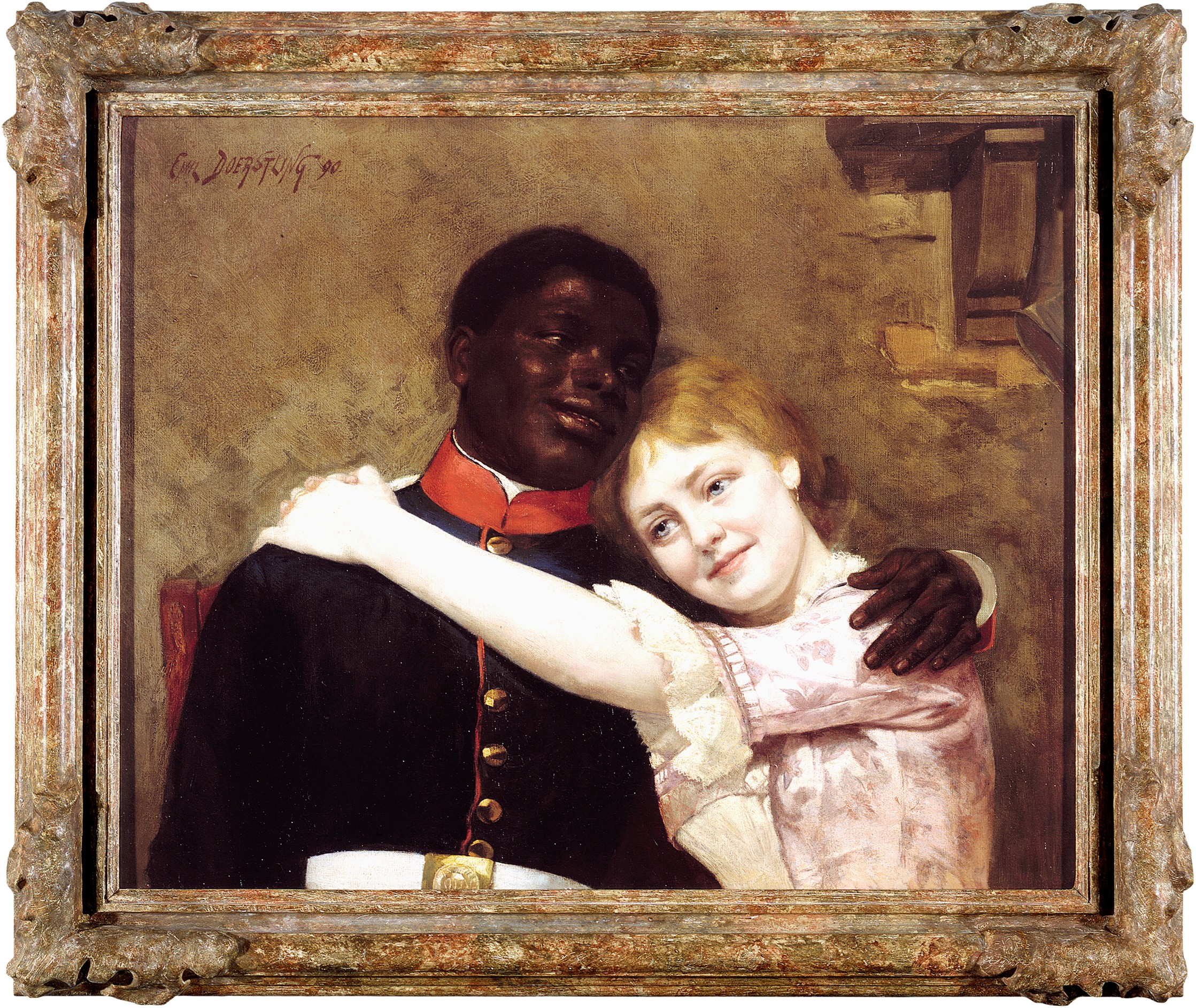
August Sabac el Cher's son Gustav

August Albrecht Sabac el Cher (1836-1885), was an early Afro-German official at the court of Prussia.

== Life ==
August, though not yet named that, was given to Prince Albert of Prussia as a boy in 1843 when the Prince was in Egypt. He eventually became a Prussian citizen and married a white woman.

His son Gustav Sabac el Cher became a respected soldier and an imperial bandmaster.
