= Prince Albert of Prussia (1809–1872) =

Prussian prince (1809–1872)

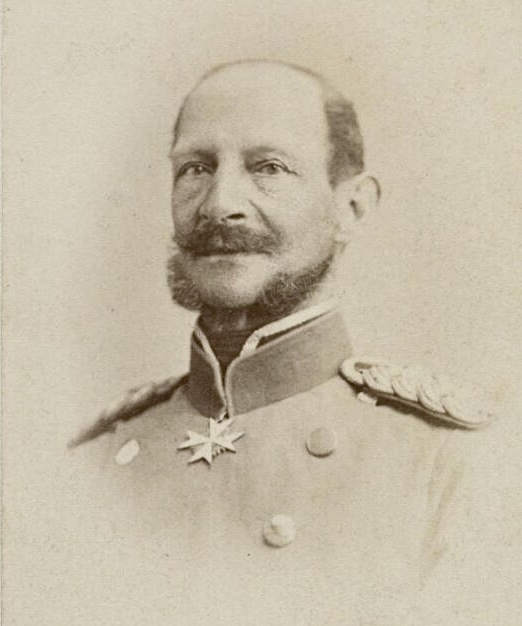
- Prince Albert, c. 1860s
- Born: 4 October 1809; Königsberg, Kingdom of Prussia
- Died: 14 October 1872 (aged 63); Berlin, German Empire
- Burial: Charlottenburg Palace Park Mausoleum, Berlin
- Spouse: Princess Marianne of the Netherlands (m. 1830; div. 1849) Rosalie von Rauch (morganatic) (m. 1853)
- Issue: Charlotte, Hereditary Princess of Saxe-Meiningen; Prince Albert; Princess Elizabeth; Alexandrine, Duchess William of Mecklenburg-Schwerin; Wilhelm, Count of Hohenau (morganatic); Frederick, Count of Hohenau (morganatic)
Names
- Frederick Henry Albert
- House: Hohenzollern
- Father: Frederick William III of Prussia
- Mother: Louise of Mecklenburg-Strelitz

Prince Frederick Henry Albert of Prussia (German: Friedrich Heinrich Albrecht; 4 October 1809 – 14 October 1872) was the fifth son and youngest child of King Frederick William III of Prussia and Louise of Mecklenburg-Strelitz. His parents had fled to East Prussia after the occupation of Berlin by Napoleon, and Albert was born in Königsberg. Two of Albert's elder brothers were Frederick William IV, King of Prussia from 1840 till 1861, and Wilhelm I, King of Prussia from 1861 to 1888 and German Emperor from 1871 until 1888.

== Career ==
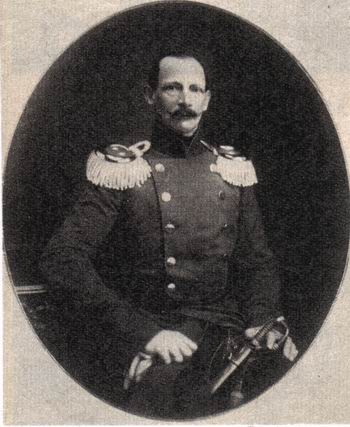
Photograph of Prince Albert, c. 1870-72

In 1819 he joined the Prussian Army as a lieutenant and held the rank of a general of cavalry in 1852. He took part in the 1866 Austro-Prussian War as a cavalry corps commander at the battles of Gitschin and Königgrätz. In the Franco-Prussian War of 1870/71 he led a cavalry division at the battles of Wissembourg, Wörth and Sedan. He later joined the forces of his nephews Prince Frederick Charles of Prussia and Frederick Francis II, Grand Duke of Mecklenburg-Schwerin in the campaign against the Armée de la Loire.

After the war Albert was awarded the title of a Generaloberst. He died in Berlin, where he is buried at the Charlottenburg Palace Park Mausoleum.

He was the 74th Grand Cross of the Order of the Tower and Sword.

== Family ==
In The Hague, on 14 September 1830 Albert married his first cousin Princess Marianne, daughter of King William I of the Netherlands. The marriage was dissolved on 28 March 1849. They had five children:

- Charlotte (b. Schloss Schönhausen, near Berlin, 21 June 1831 - d. Meiningen, 30 March 1855), married on 18 May 1850 to the future Georg II, Duke of Saxe-Meiningen.
- A son (Prinz-Albrecht-Palais, Wilhelmstraße, near Berlin, 4 December 1832). He was either stillborn or lived only a few hours.
- Albert (b. Berlin, 8 May 1837 - d. Kamenz, 13 September 1906), married Princess Marie of Saxe-Altenburg, had 3 sons.
- Elisabeth (b. Kamenz, 27 August 1840 - d. Kamenz, 9 October 1840) died in infancy.
- Alexandrine (b. Berlin, 1 February 1842 - d. Schloss Marley, near Potsdam, 26 March 1906), married on 9 December 1865 to Duke William of Mecklenburg-Schwerin.

In Berlin on 13 June 1853, Albert married secondly Rosalie Wilhelmine Johanna von Rauch, daughter of Gustav von Rauch, chief of the Prussian General Staff 1812-1813 and Prussian Minister of War 1837–1841. She was created Countess of Hohenau on 28 May 1853. They had two sons:

- Georg Albrecht Wilhelm, Count of Hohenau (b. Albrechtsberg Castle, 25 April 1854 - d. Bad Flinsburg, 28 October 1930). He married Princess Margarethe of Hohenlohe-Öhringen (1865-1940), daughter of Hugo zu Hohenlohe-Öhringen.
- Bernhard Wilhelm Albrecht Frederick, Count of Hohenau (b. Albrechtsberg Castle, 21 May 1857 - d. Ochelhermsdorf, 15 April 1914).

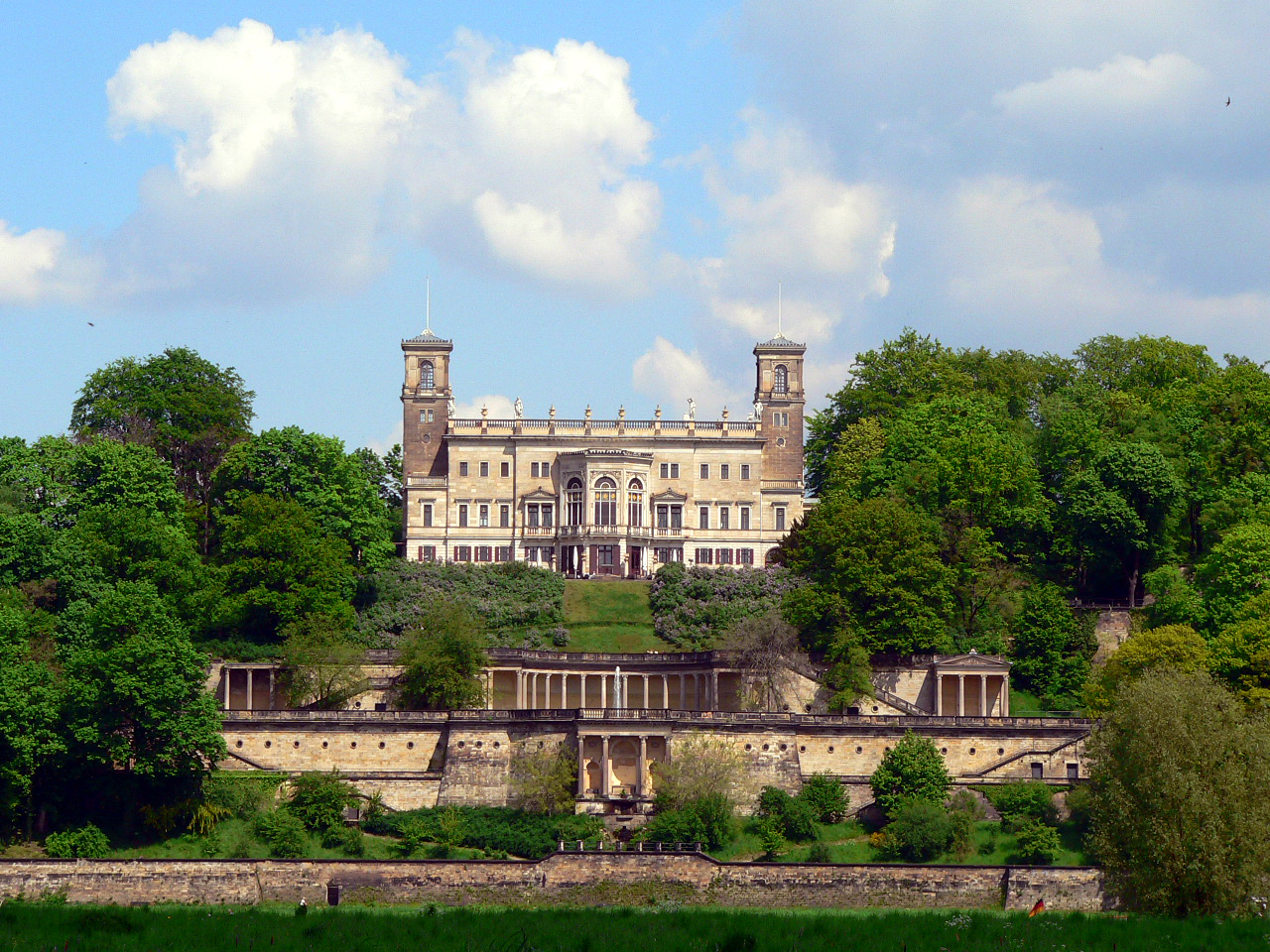
Albrechtsberg Castle, Dresden.

As this second union was considered a morganatic marriage, the couple temporarily had to avoid the Prussian court. Albert acquired a vineyard in Loschwitz near Dresden, Saxony, where he had a residence, Albrechtsberg Castle, erected in 1854.

== Aftermath ==
In 1830 Albert had acquired a city palace in Berlin on Wilhelmstraße, then called Prinz-Albrecht-Palais. An adjacent street off Wilhelmstraße laid out in 1891 was named Prinz-Albrecht-Straße. After the Nazi Machtergreifung it became notorious as the seat of the Gestapo and the Reichsführer-SS. The Prinz-Albrecht-Palais itself from 1934 served as the headquarters of the SS Sicherheitsdienst under Reinhard Heydrich, from 1939 the Reichssicherheitshauptamt. In 1944 the building was heavily damaged by air raids and finally razed to the ground in 1955, leaving the foundations and cellars exposed to the open air. They remain so today, and are used as part of the Topography of Terror project.

== Honours ==
German orders and decorations

- Prussia:
  - Knight of the Black Eagle, 4 October 1819; with Collar, 1827
  - Grand Cross of the Red Eagle, with Oak Leaves and Swords
  - Pour le Mérite (military), 31 July 1866; with Oak Leaves, 31 December 1870
  - Knight of the Royal Crown Order, 1st Class with Swords
  - Grand Commander's Cross of the Royal House Order of Hohenzollern
  - Service Award Cross
- (Hohenzollern-Sigmaringen) Hohenzollern: Cross of Honour of the Princely House Order of Hohenzollern, 1st Class with Swords
- Hanover:
  - Grand Cross of the Royal Guelphic Order, 1838
  - Knight of St. George, 1840
- Hesse-Kassel: Knight of the Golden Lion, 5 September 1841
- Ascanian duchies: Grand Cross of the Order of Albert the Bear, 29 November 1854; with Swords, 12 September 1864
- Baden:
  - Knight of the House Order of Fidelity, 1856
  - Grand Cross of the Zähringer Lion, 1856
- Brunswick: Grand Cross of the Order of Henry the Lion
- Hesse-Darmstadt: Grand Cross of the Ludwig Order, 6 July 1851
- Mecklenburg: Grand Cross of the Wendish Crown, with Crown in Ore
- Oldenburg: Grand Cross of the Order of Duke Peter Friedrich Ludwig, with Golden Crown, 18 September 1861
- Saxony: Knight of the Rue Crown, 1854
- Saxe-Weimar-Eisenach: Grand Cross of the White Falcon, 11 November 1842
- (Saxe-Coburg and Gotha) (Duchy of Saxe-Altenburg) (Saxe-Meiningen) Ernestine duchies: Grand Cross of the Saxe-Ernestine House Order, 1850
- Württemberg: Grand Cross of the Württemberg Crown, 1841

Foreign orders and decorations

- Austrian Empire:
  - Grand Cross of the Royal Hungarian Order of St. Stephen, 1835
  - Military Merit Cross, with War Decoration
- Belgium: Grand Cordon of the Order of Leopold (military), 25 April 1867
- French Empire: Grand Cross of the Legion of Honour, 1858
- Kingdom of Greece: Grand Cross of the Redeemer
- Netherlands: Grand Cross of the Netherlands Lion
- Ottoman Empire: Sword of Honour
- Kingdom of Portugal: Grand Cross of the Tower and Sword
- Two Sicilies: Grand Cross of St. Ferdinand and Merit
- Russian Empire:
  - Knight of St. Andrew, 1826
  - Knight of St. Alexander Nevsky
  - Knight of the White Eagle
  - Knight of St. Anna, 1st Class
  - Knight of St. Stanislaus, 1st Class
  - Knight of St. George, 3rd Class, October 1870

== Ancestry ==
Ancestors of Prince Albert of Prussia (1809–1872)

8. Prince Augustus William of Prussia
4. Frederick William II of Prussia
9. Duchess Luise of Brunswick-Wolfenbüttel
2. Frederick William III of Prussia
10. Louis IX, Landgrave of Hesse-Darmstadt
5. Princess Frederica Louisa of Hesse-Darmstadt
11. Countess Palatine Caroline of Zweibrücken
1. Prince Albert of Prussia
12. Duke Charles Louis Frederick of Mecklenburg-Strelitz
6. Charles II, Grand Duke of Mecklenburg-Strelitz
13. Princess Elisabeth Albertine of Saxe-Hildburghausen
3. Duchess Louise of Mecklenburg-Strelitz
14. Prince George William of Hesse-Darmstadt
7. Princess Friederike of Hesse-Darmstadt
15. Countess Maria Louise Albertine of Leiningen-Dagsburg-Falkenburg
