= Prince Albert of Prussia (1837–1906) =

German prince and military general

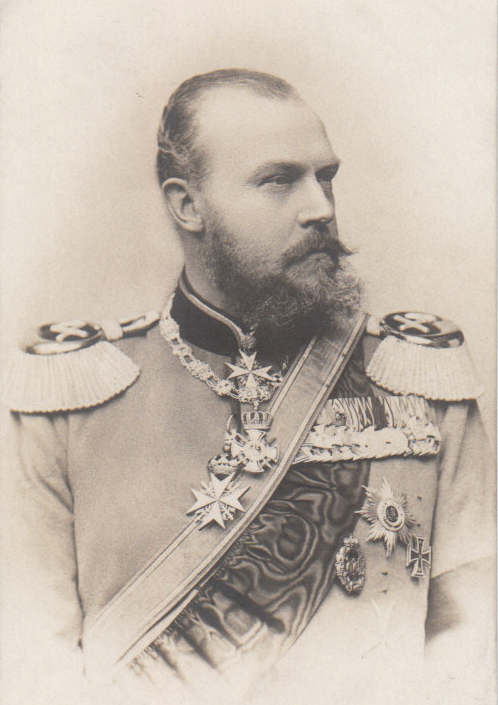
- Prince Albert in 1883
- Born: 8 May 1837; Berlin, Prussia
- Died: 13 September 1906 (aged 69); Kamenz
- Burial: Kamenz
- Spouse: Princess Marie of Saxe-Altenburg (m. 1873; died 1898)
- Issue: Prince Friedrich Heinrich; Prince Joachim; Prince Friedrich Wilhelm
Names
- Friedrich Wilhelm Nikolaus Albrecht
- House: Hohenzollern
- Father: Prince Albert of Prussia
- Mother: Princess Marianne of the Netherlands

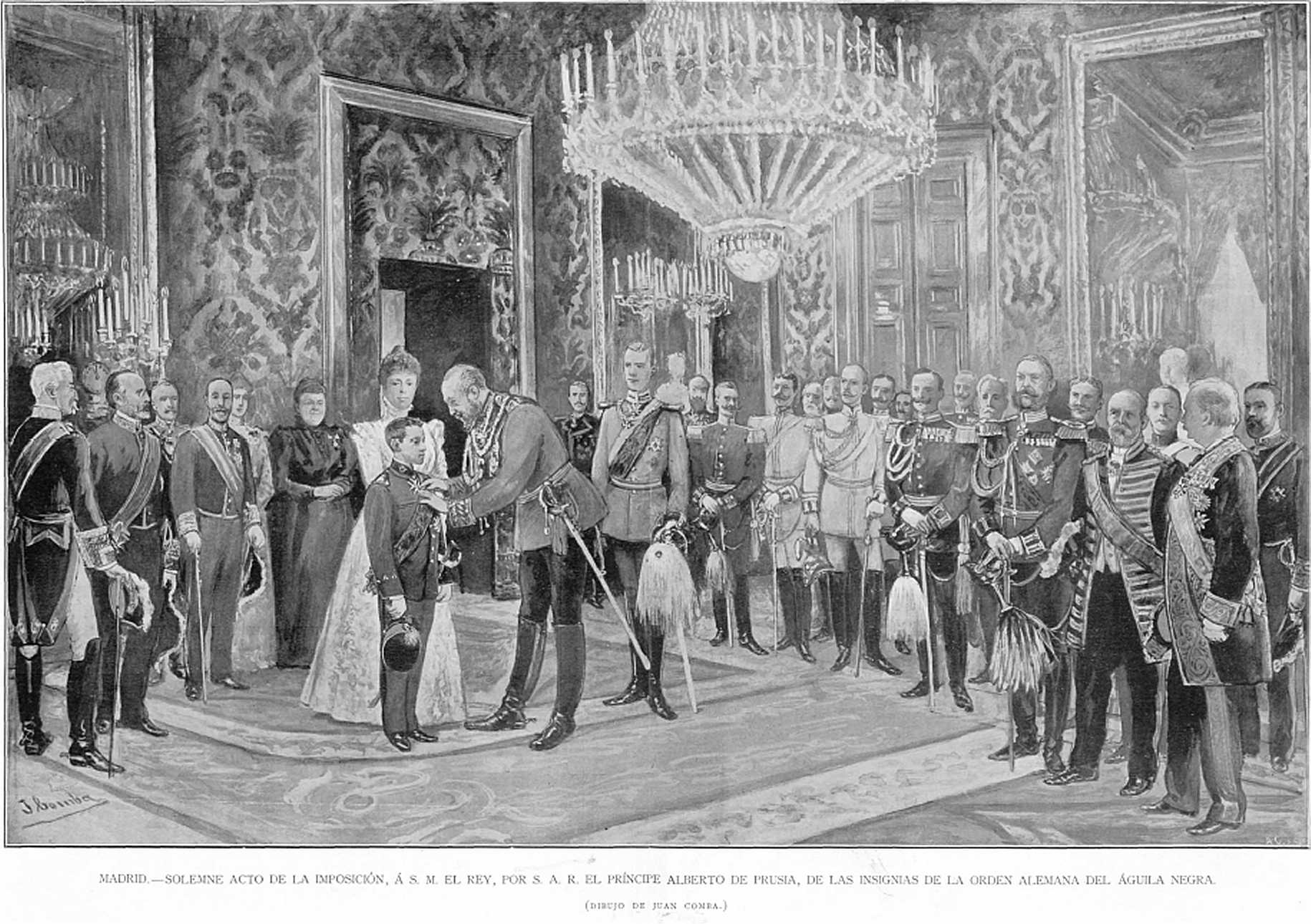
Madrid solemn act of the imposition to H.M. the King by Prince Albert of Prussia. (Illustration by Juan Comba)

Prince Albert of Prussia (German: Friedrich Wilhelm Nikolaus Albrecht; 8 May 1837 – 13 September 1906) was a Prussian general field marshal, Herrenmeister (Grand Master) of the Order of Saint John from 1883 until his death, and regent of the Duchy of Brunswick from 1885, also until his death.

== Biography ==
Albert was born in Berlin on 8 May 1837, the son of Prince Albert of Prussia and Princess Marianne, daughter of King William I of the Netherlands. His father was the brother of King Frederick William IV of Prussia and William I, German Emperor.

Albrecht entered the Prussian army in 1847, serving in the First Schleswig War and participating in the battles of Skalitz, Schweinschädel and Königgrätz in the Austro-Prussian War in 1866. In the Franco-Prussian War in 1870, he commanded a guard cavalry brigade at Gravelotte and Sedan. After the fall of the Second Empire, he was subordinated to Edwin von Manteuffel in the fighting around Bapaume and St. Quentin. In 1874, he became commander of the X Corps stationed in Hannover. In 1883, he succeeded his uncle Prince Charles as Herrenmeister of the Order of Saint John (Bailiwick of Brandenburg). In 1885, Albert was chosen as Regent for the Duchy of Brunswick, as German Chancellor Otto von Bismarck had removed Ernest Augustus, Crown Prince of Hanover, from office. In 1913, Ernst August's son, Ernest Augustus, became Duke of Brunswick who only reigned for 5 years and 6 days. After accepting the regency, Albert and Marie resided chiefly in Brunswick, Berlin, and Kamenz.

Prince Albrecht died at Schloss Kamenz on 13 September 1906. He was buried in the Mausoleum auf dem Hutberge in the park of Schloss Kamenz. After World War II, the mausoleum was plundered and the bodies of Albert and his wife were reburied in the park.

=== Marriage and issue ===
Albert's parents had been unhappily married to each other and were later divorced. The unhappiness of that marriage had been a formative influence on Albert during his growing years. His decision to wait until he was 36 before marrying is thought to have been a reflection of his parents' marital situation.

On 9 April 1873 in Berlin, he married Princess Marie of Saxe-Altenburg. They had three sons:

- Prince Friedrich Heinrich Albrecht (15 April 1874 – 13 November 1940)
- Prince Joachim Albrecht (27 September 1876 – 24 October 1939); married firstly Baroness Marie of Liebenberg (née Blich-Sulzer) (1872-1919) and Karoline Kornelia Stockhammer (1891-1952)
- Prince Friedrich Wilhelm (12 July 1880 – 9 March 1925); married Princess Agatha of Hohenlohe-Schillingsfürst

== Honours and awards ==
German honours

- Prussia:
  - Knight of the Black Eagle, 8 May 1847; with Collar, 1856
  - Grand Commander's Cross of the Royal House Order of Hohenzollern, 23 August 1851; with Swords, 1871
  - Grand Cross of the Red Eagle, with Oak Leaves, 18 October 1861; with Swords, 1864; with Crown, 12 June 1892
  - Knight of the Crown Order, 1st Class, 18 October 1861
  - Iron Cross (1870), 1st Class
  - Pour le Mérite (military), 19 September 1866; with Oak Leaves, 10 March 1871
  - Commander of Honour of the Johanniter Order, 1868; Master of Knights, 1883-1906
  - Knight of Merit of the Prussian Crown, 18 January 1901
- Hohenzollern: Cross of Honour of the Princely House Order of Hohenzollern, 1st Class with Swords
- Ascanian duchies: Grand Cross of the Order of Albert the Bear, 29 November 1854; with Swords, 5 December 1864
- Baden:
  - Knight of the House Order of Fidelity, 1856
  - Grand Cross of the Zähringer Lion, 1856
  - Commander of the Military Karl-Friedrich Merit Order, 1871
- Bavaria: Knight of St. Hubert, 1853
- Brunswick: Grand Cross of the Order of Henry the Lion, 1871; Grand Master (as Regent), 1885-1906
- (Saxe-Coburg and Gotha) (Duchy of Saxe-Altenburg) (Saxe-Meiningen) Ernestine duchies: Grand Cross of the Saxe-Ernestine House Order, January 1855
- Hesse-Kassel: Knight of the Golden Lion, 16 April 1853
- Hesse-Darmstadt: Grand Cross of the Ludwig Order, 6 May 1870
- Lippe-Detmold: Grand Cross of the House Order of Lippe
- Mecklenburg:
  - Grand Cross of the Wendish Crown, with Crown in Ore
  - Military Merit Cross, 1st Class (Mecklenburg-Schwerin)
- Oldenburg: Grand Cross of the Order of Duke Peter Friedrich Ludwig, with Golden Crown, 5 September 1850
- Saxe-Weimar-Eisenach: Grand Cross of the White Falcon, 1869
- Saxony: Knight of the Rue Crown, 1854
- Württemberg: Grand Cross of the Württemberg Crown, 1885

Foreign honours

- Austrian Empire: Grand Cross of the Royal Hungarian Order of St. Stephen, 1852
- Belgium: Grand Cordon of the Order of Leopold (military), 25 April 1867
- Kingdom of Italy: Knight of the Annunciation, 1889
  - (Kingdom of the Two Sicilies) Two Sicilian Royal family: Grand Cross of St. Ferdinand and Merit
- Netherlands:
  - Commander of the Military William Order, 25 August 1878
  - Grand Cross of the Netherlands Lion
- Kingdom of Portugal: Grand Cross of the Tower and Sword
- Kingdom of Romania: Grand Cross of the Star of Romania
- Russian Empire:
  - Knight of St. Andrew
  - Knight of St. Alexander Nevsky
  - Knight of the White Eagle
  - Knight of St. Anna, 1st Class
  - Knight of St. Stanislaus, 1st Class
  - Knight of St. George, 4th Class
- Spain:
  - Knight of the Golden Fleece, 15 December 1891
  - Grand Cross of the Order of Charles III, with Collar, 15 May 1902
- Sweden-Norway: Grand Cross of St. Olav, 3 September 1856
- United Kingdom:
  - Honorary Grand Cross of the Bath (military)
  - Honorary Knight of Justice of St. John

== Ancestry ==
Ancestors of Prince Albert of Prussia (1837–1906)

8. Frederick William II of Prussia (= 14)
4. Frederick William III of Prussia
9. Princess Frederica Louisa of Hesse-Darmstadt (= 15)
2. Prince Albert of Prussia
10. Charles II, Grand Duke of Mecklenburg-Strelitz
5. Duchess Louise of Mecklenburg-Strelitz
11. Princess Friederike of Hesse-Darmstadt
1. Prince Albert of Prussia
12. William V, Prince of Orange
6. William I of the Netherlands
13. Princess Wilhelmina of Prussia
3. Princess Marianne of the Netherlands
14. Frederick William II of Prussia (= 8)
7. Princess Wilhelmine of Prussia
15. Princess Frederica Louisa of Hesse-Darmstadt (= 9)

Prince Albert of Prussia (1837–1906) House of Hohenzollern Born: 8 May 1837 Died: 13 September 1906
Preceded by Friedrich Carl Alexander, Prinz von Preußen	Herrenmeister (Grand Master) of the Order of Saint John; 1883–1906	Succeeded by Eitel Friedrich, Prinz von Preußen
