= 1774 =

1774 in various calendars
- Gregorian calendar: 1774; MDCCLXXIV
- Ab urbe condita: 2527
- Armenian calendar: 1223; ԹՎ ՌՄԻԳ
- Assyrian calendar: 6524
- Balinese saka calendar: 1695–1696
- Bengali calendar: 1180–1181
- Berber calendar: 2724
- British Regnal year: 14 Geo. 3 – 15 Geo. 3
- Buddhist calendar: 2318
- Burmese calendar: 1136
- Byzantine calendar: 7282–7283
- Chinese calendar: 癸巳年 (Water Snake); 4471 or 4264 — to — 甲午年 (Wood Horse); 4472 or 4265
- Coptic calendar: 1490–1491
- Discordian calendar: 2940
- Ethiopian calendar: 1766–1767
- Hebrew calendar: 5534–5535
- Hindu calendars
- Vikram Samvat: 1830–1831
- Shaka Samvat: 1695–1696
- Kali Yuga: 4874–4875
- Holocene calendar: 11774
- Igbo calendar: 774–775
- Iranian calendar: 1152–1153
- Islamic calendar: 1187–1188
- Japanese calendar: An'ei 3 (安永３年)
- Javanese calendar: 1699–1700
- Julian calendar: Gregorian minus 11 days
- Korean calendar: 4107
- Minguo calendar: 138 before ROC 民前138年
- Nanakshahi calendar: 306
- Thai solar calendar: 2316–2317
- Tibetan calendar: ཆུ་མོ་སྦྲུལ་ལོ་ (female Water-Snake); 1900 or 1519 or 747 — to — ཤིང་ཕོ་རྟ་ལོ་ (male Wood-Horse); 1901 or 1520 or 748

1774 (MDCCLXXIV) was a common year starting on Saturday of the Gregorian calendar and a common year starting on Wednesday of the Julian calendar, the 1774th year of the Common Era (CE) and Anno Domini (AD) designations, the 774th year of the 2nd millennium, the 74th year of the 18th century, and the 5th year of the 1770s decade. As of the start of 1774, the Gregorian calendar was 11 days ahead of the Julian calendar, which remained in localized use until 1923.

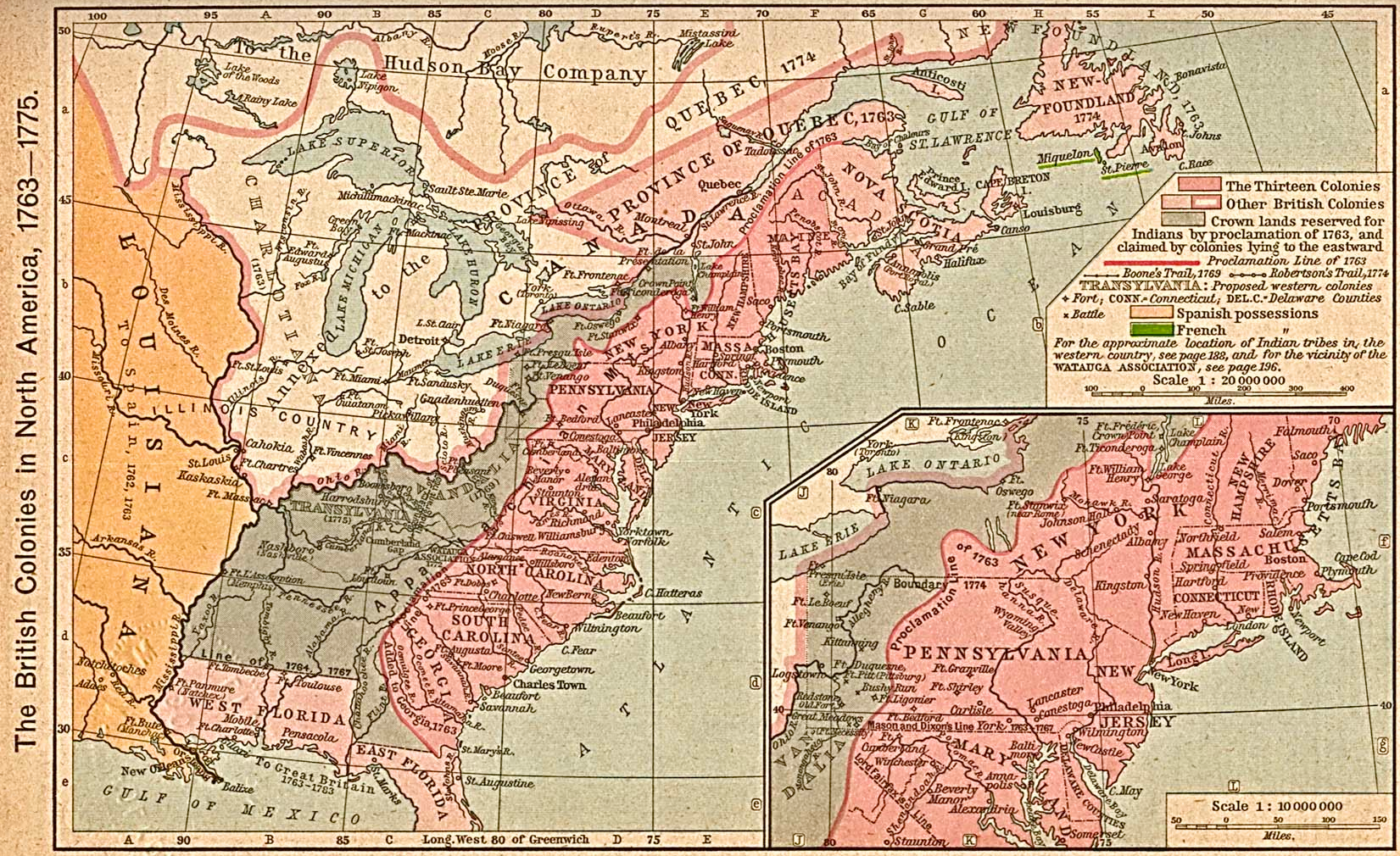
June 22: Britain makes territory north of the Ohio River part of Quebec.

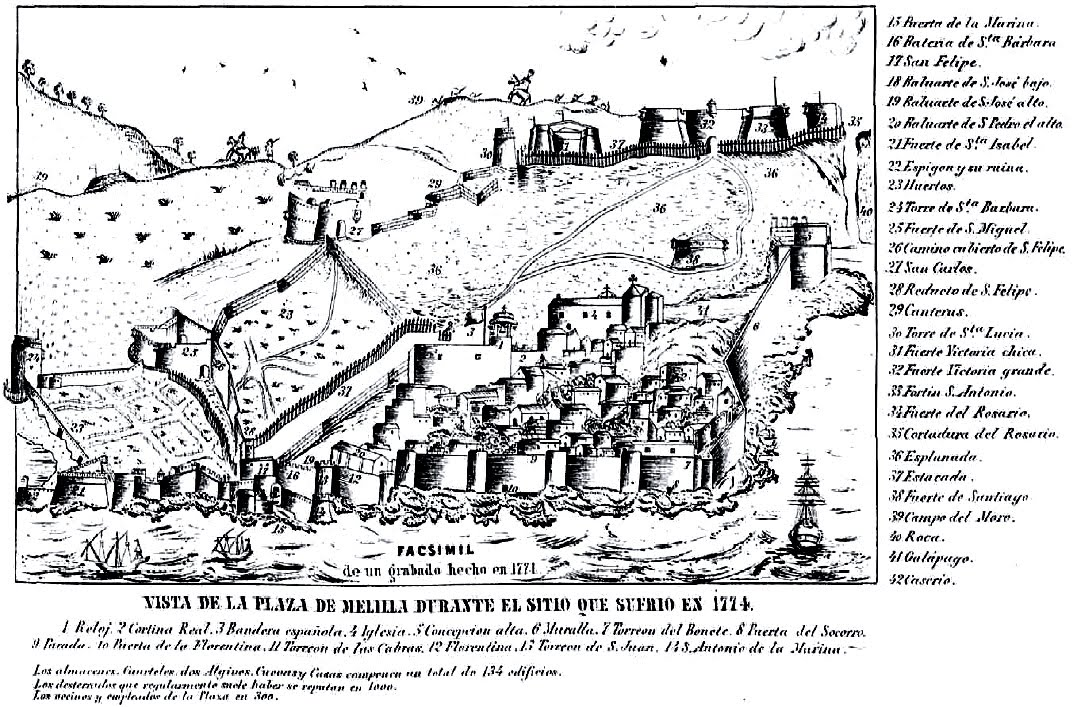
December 9: Start of the two month long Siege of Melilla.

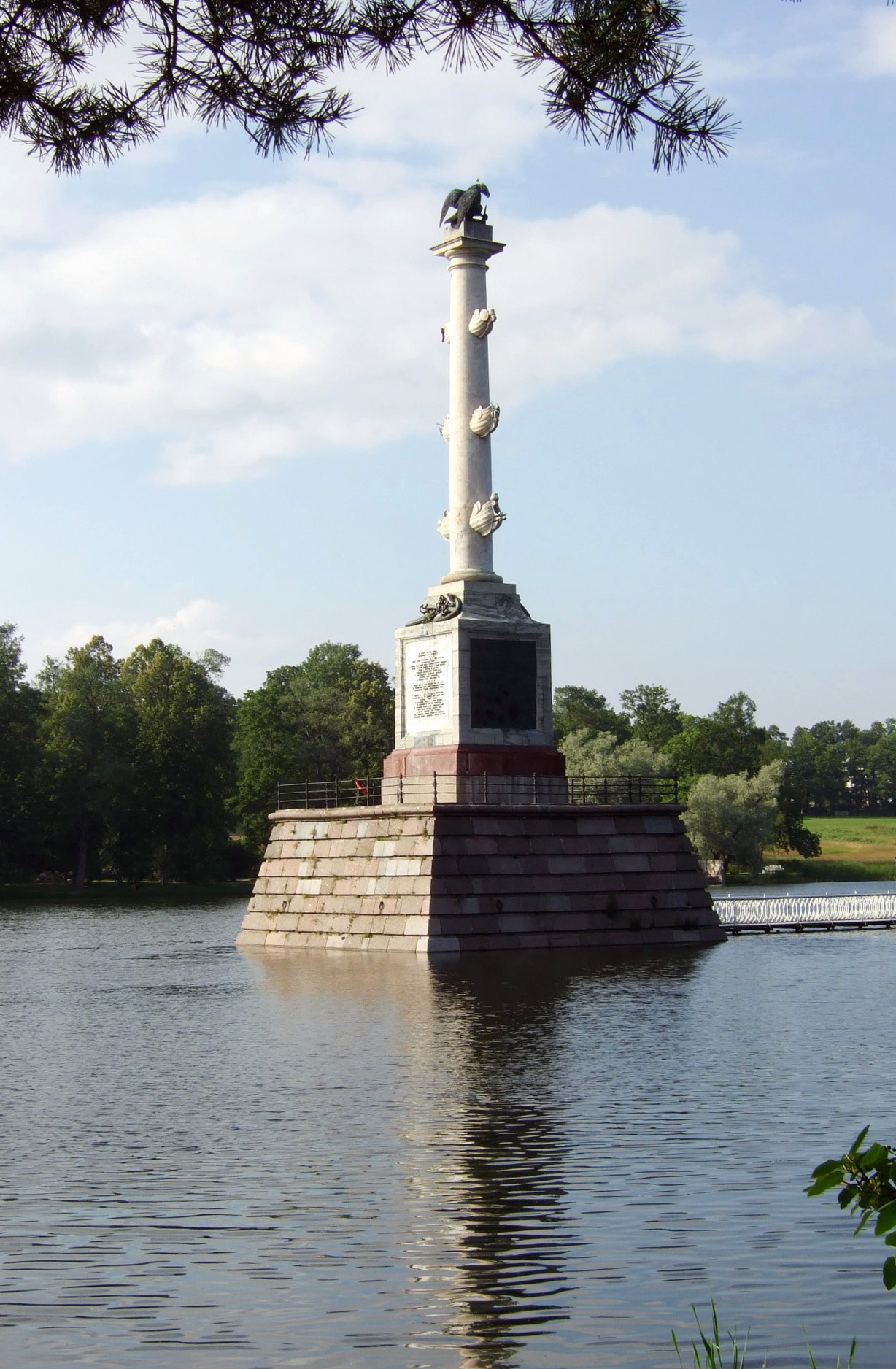
Chesma Column in Tsarskoe Selo, commemorating the end of the Russo-Turkish War.

== Events ==
=== January–March ===
- January 21 – Mustafa III, Sultan of the Ottoman Empire, dies and is succeeded by his brother Abdul Hamid I.
- January 27
  - An angry crowd in Boston, Massachusetts seizes, tars, and feathers British customs collector and Loyalist John Malcolm, for striking a boy and a shoemaker, George Hewes, with his cane.
  - British industrialist John Wilkinson patents a method for boring cannon from the solid, subsequently utilised for accurate boring of steam engine cylinders.
- February 3 – The Privy Council of Great Britain, as advisors to King George III, votes for the King's abolition of free land grants of North American lands. Henceforward, land is to be sold at auction to the highest bidder.
- February 6 – The Parlement of Paris votes a sentence of civil degradation, depriving Pierre Beaumarchais of all rights and duties of citizenship.
- February 7 – The volunteer fire company of Trenton, New Jersey, predecessor to the paid Trenton Fire Department created in 1892, is founded. In 1905, at 131 years, it claims to be the oldest continuously serving department in the U.S.
- February 24 – The Province of Massachusetts Bay House of Representatives votes, 92 to 8, to impeach Superior Court Chief Justice Peter Oliver, but Provincial Governor Thomas Hutchinson refuses to allow the trial to proceed.
- March 10 – The Boston Journal makes the first reference to the "Stars and Stripes" flag to symbolize the American colonies, reporting that "The American ensign now sparkles a door which shall shortly flame from the skies."
- March 31 – Intolerable Acts: The British Parliament passes the Boston Port Act, closing the port of Boston, Massachusetts, as punishment for the Boston Tea Party.

=== April–June ===
- April 17 – The first avowedly Unitarian congregation, Essex Street Chapel, is founded in London by Theophilus Lindsey.
- April 19 – The premiere of Iphigénie en Aulide by Christoph Willibald Gluck sparks a huge controversy, almost a war, such as has not been seen in Paris since the Querelle des Bouffons.
- May 10 – Louis XVI becomes King of France, following the death of his grandfather, Louis XV.
- May 17 – The colony of Rhode Island and Providence Plantations issues the first call for an "Intercolonial Congress" that eventually is set up as the Continental Congress.
- May 19 – Shakers Ann Lee and eight followers sail from Liverpool, England for colonial America.
- June 2 – Intolerable Acts: A new Quartering Act, requiring American colonists to provide better housing for British soldiers upon demand, is passed.
- June 16–17 – English explorer James Cook becomes the first European to sight (and name) Palmerston Island in the South Pacific Ocean.
- June 20 (June 9 O.S.) – Russo-Turkish War (1768–1774): Battle of Kozludzha – The Imperial Russian Army, led by Alexander Suvorov, routs numerically superior Ottoman Empire forces.
- June 22 – The Parliament of Great Britain passes the Quebec Act, setting out rules of governance for the colony of Quebec in British North America, enlarging its territory as far south as the Ohio River and west to the Mississippi River, in the area now occupied by the U.S. states of Michigan, Wisconsin, Illinois, Indiana and Ohio and granting freedom of religion for Roman Catholics.

=== July–September ===
- July 21 – Russia and the Ottoman Empire sign the Treaty of Küçük Kaynarca with Russian victory, ending six years of war. The treaty gives Russia the right to intervene in Ottoman politics, to protect its Christian subjects.
- August 1 – The element oxygen is discovered for the third time (the second quantitatively, following the somewhat earlier work of Carl Wilhelm Scheele (1771–72) by Joseph Priestley, who publishes the fact in 1775, and so names the element (and usually gets all the credit, because his work was published first).
- August 6 – Ann Lee and the Shakers arrive in America and settle in New York.
- September 1 – Powder Alarm: Thomas Gage, royal governor of the Province of Massachusetts Bay, orders British soldiers to remove gunpowder from a magazine, causing Patriots to prepare for war.
- September 4 – English explorer James Cook becomes the first European to sight (and name) the island of New Caledonia in Melanesia.
- September 5 – The First Continental Congress assembles in Philadelphia.
- September 15 – Yemelyan Pugachev, leader of Pugachev's Rebellion against Russia by the Yaik Cossacks, is betrayed by his own men after returning to Yaitsk (now Oral, Kazakhstan).
- September 21 – George Mason and George Washington found the Fairfax County Militia Association, a military unit independent of British control.
- September 29 – Johann Wolfgang von Goethe's semi-autobiographical epistolary novel The Sorrows of Young Werther (Die Leiden des jungen Werthers) (written January–March) is published anonymously in Leipzig, Germany; it is influential in the Sturm und Drang movement and Romanticism.

=== October–December ===
- October 10
  - Dunmore's War – Battle of Point Pleasant: Cornstalk is forced to make peace with Dunmore at the Treaty of Camp Charlotte, ceding Shawnee land claims south of the Ohio (modern Kentucky) to Virginia.
  - English explorer James Cook becomes the first European to sight (and name) Norfolk Island in the Pacific Ocean, uninhabited at this date.
- October 14 – The Continental Congress in America adopts the Declaration of Rights and Resolves, with 10 principles.
- October 20 – The First Continental Congress passes the Continental Association, a colony-wide boycotting of British goods. Theater performances in the American colonies are also halted, on the Congress's recommendation that the member colonies "discountenance and discourage all horse racing and all kinds of gaming, cock fighting, exhibitions of shows, plays, and other expensive diversions and entertainments."
- October 21 – The word Liberty is first displayed on a flag raised by colonists in Taunton, Massachusetts, in defiance of British rule in Colonial America.
- October 25 – The Edenton Tea Party takes place in North Carolina, marking the first major gathering of women in support of the American cause.
- October 26 – The first Continental Congress adjourns in Philadelphia.
- November 4 – The Maryland Jockey Club follows a recommendation of the Continental Congress and cancels its race schedule. The decision sets a precedent for other jockey clubs in the colonies, and no major races are held until the end of the American Revolution.
- November 10 – 1774 British general election: Voting for the House of Commons concludes in Great Britain, and Lord North retains the office of Prime Minister as his Tory coalition wins 343 of the 558 seats. Henry Seymour Conway's Whig Party wins the other 215 seats.
- November 15 – The government of the Republic of Venice allows adventurer and ladies' man Giacomo Casanova to return home after a 17-year absence.
- November 20 – Daniel Boone retires from the Virginia colonial militia in order to devote his full time to establishing a settlement in Kentucky.
- November 25 – Salawat Yulayev, the leader of the Bashkirs rebellion against the Russian government, is captured, bringing an end to the insurrection.
- November 26 – English chemist Joseph Priestley becomes the first person to discover and identify sulfur dioxide.
- November 27 – Spanish Navy Captain Domingo de Bonechea arrives at Tahiti in the ship Aguila and tries unsuccessfully to claim it for Spain and to convert the Tahitians to the Roman Catholic faith.
- November 30
  - Parliament adjourns in Great Britain, but declines to authorize any action against the rebellious American colonies, despite an address the day before by King George III and Prime Minister North.
  - Thomas Paine, a native of England, arrives in America at the age 37 and soon becomes an influential advocate for the colonies' independence.
- December 1 – A boycott called by the Continental Congress goes into effect, as participating merchants and supporters cease the importation or consumption of products from Great Britain, Ireland or the British West Indies.
- December 6 – Empress Maria Theresa, the ruler of Austria, Hungary and Croatia, signs the General School Ordinance providing for education for both males and females and setting compulsory education for children aged six through 12.
- December 9 – The two month long Siege of Melilla begins as armies led by the Sultan of Morocco, Mohammed ben Abdallah, attack the North African Spanish colony of Melilla (which remains a part of Spain into the 21st century).
- December 23 – King Louis XVI of France issues a declaration that, for the first time, protects "the free commerce of meat during Lent" to support the needs of "the poor whose infirmity requires them to eat meat."

=== Date unknown ===
- To avoid severe flooding, Martinsborough, North Carolina is moved to higher ground 3 miles (4.8 km) west. The North Carolina General Assembly incorporates Martinsborough as the new seat of Pitt County, 3 years after its founding.
- German cobbler Johann Birkenstock creates the first Birkenstock sandals.
- A revision of the laws of cricket introduces a leg before wicket rule.

== Births ==
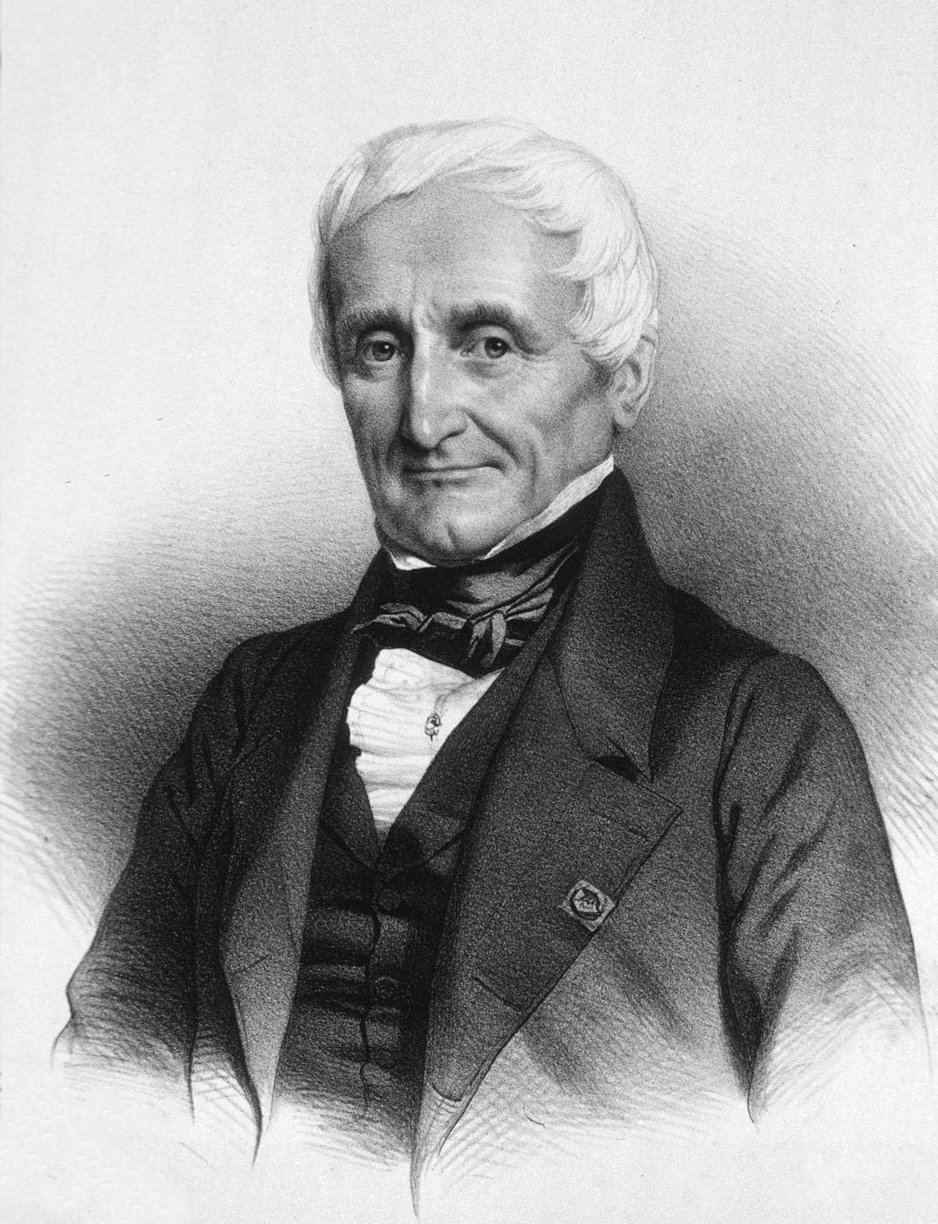
André Marie Constant Duméril born 1 January

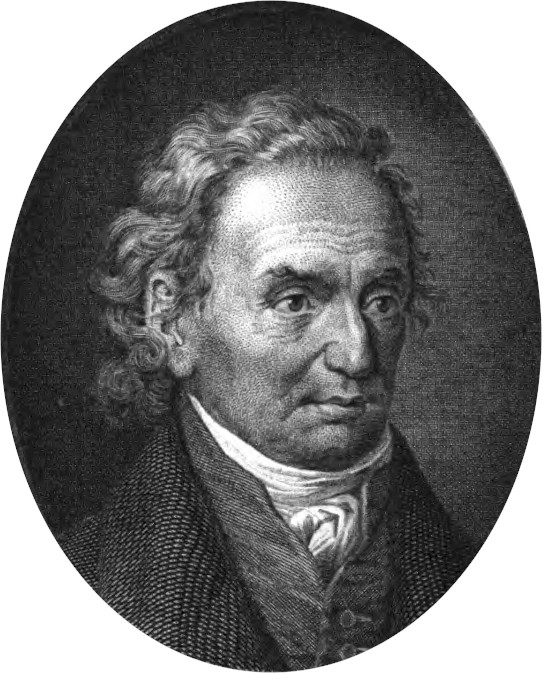
Pietro Giordani born 1 January

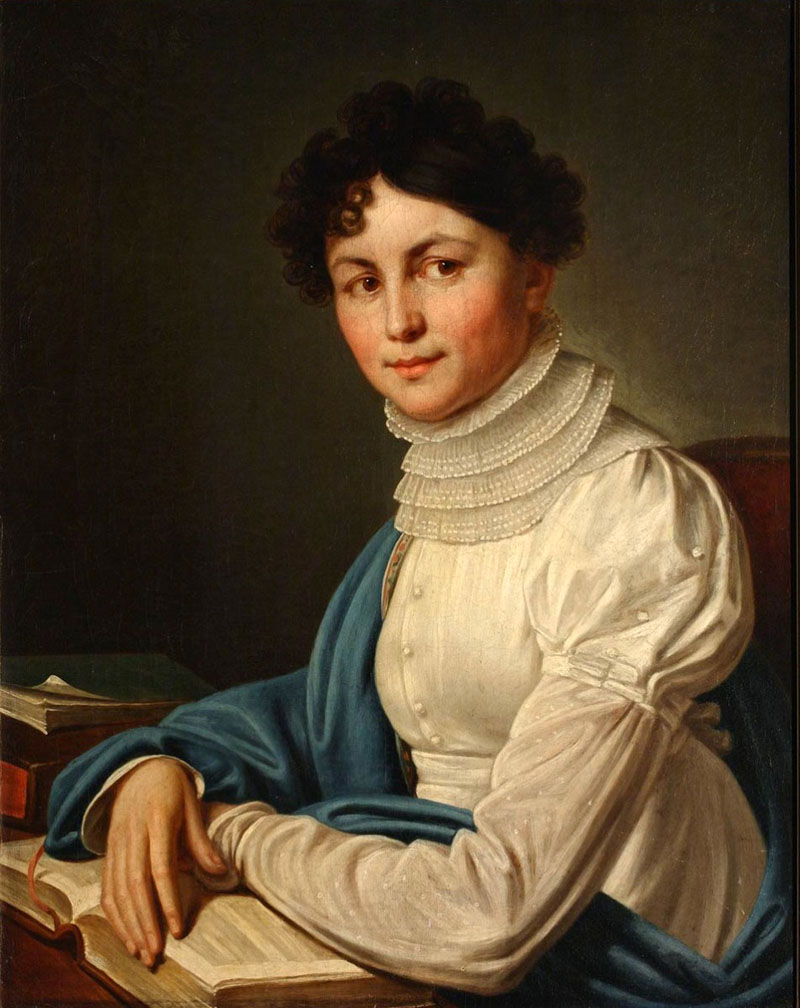
Anna Bunina born 7 January

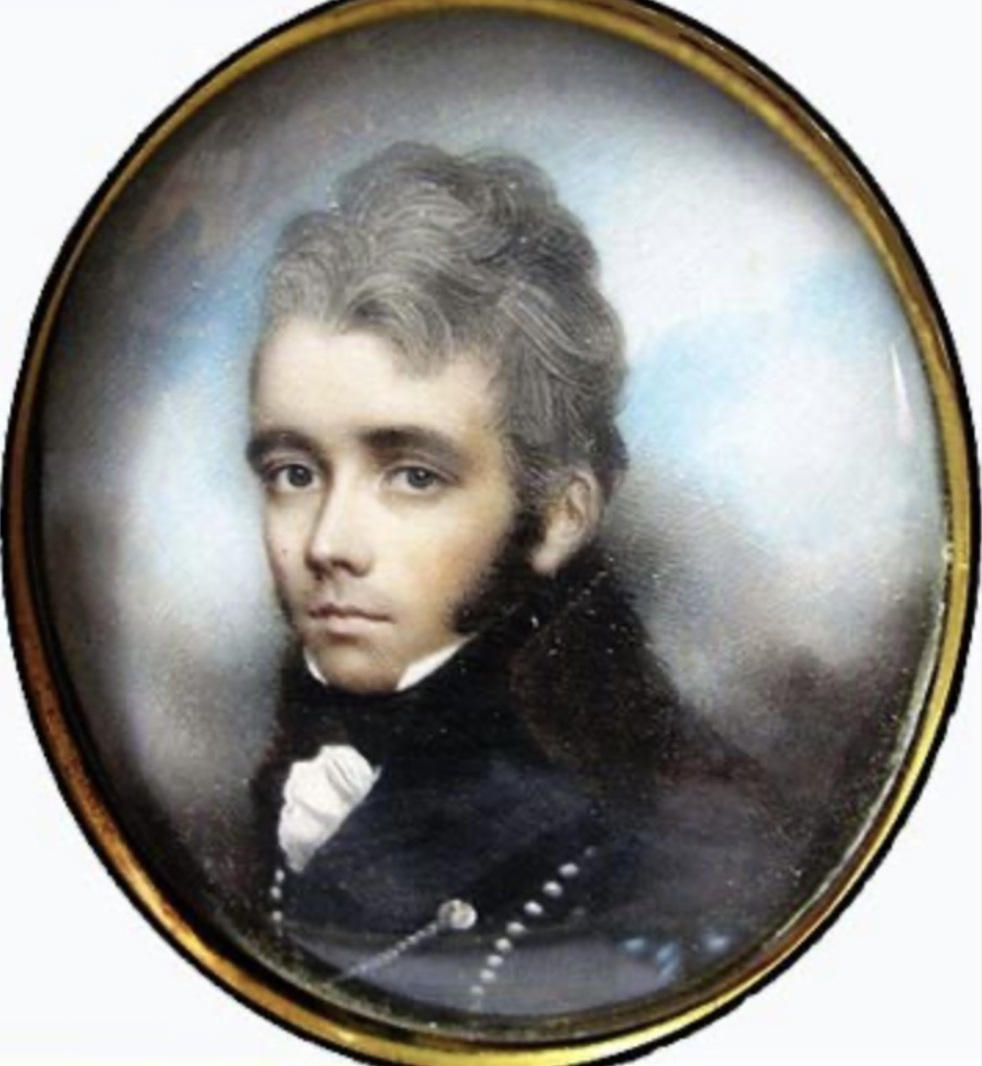
William Stewart born 10 January

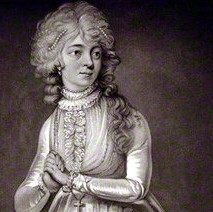
Tryphosa Jane Wallis born 11 January

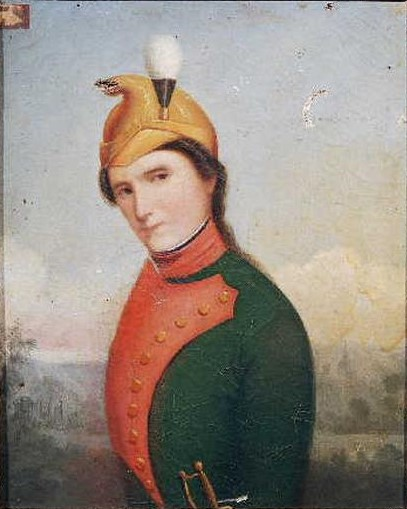
Marie-Thérèse Figueur born 17 January

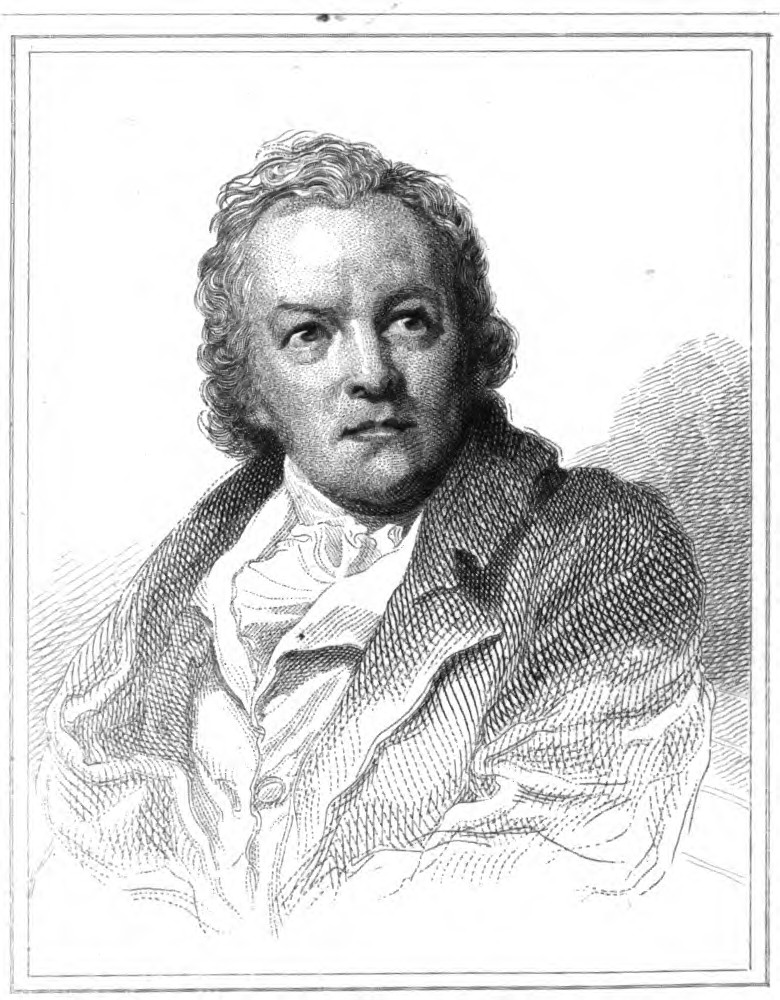
William Blake (economist) born 31 January

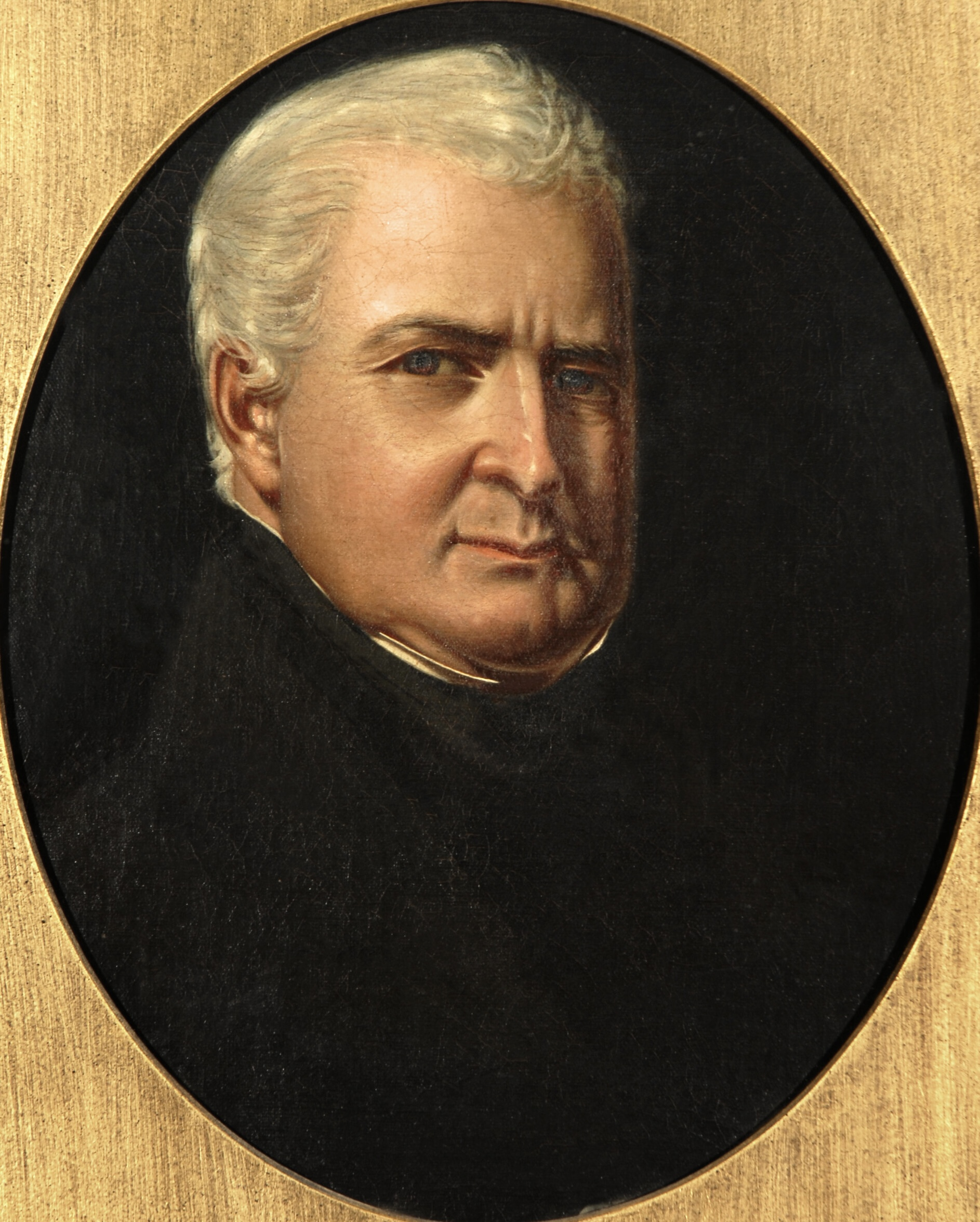
Thomas Veazey born 31 January

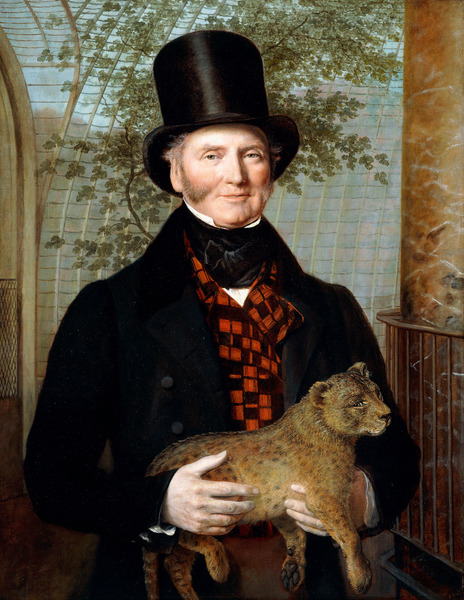
Edward Cross (zoo proprietor) born 3 February

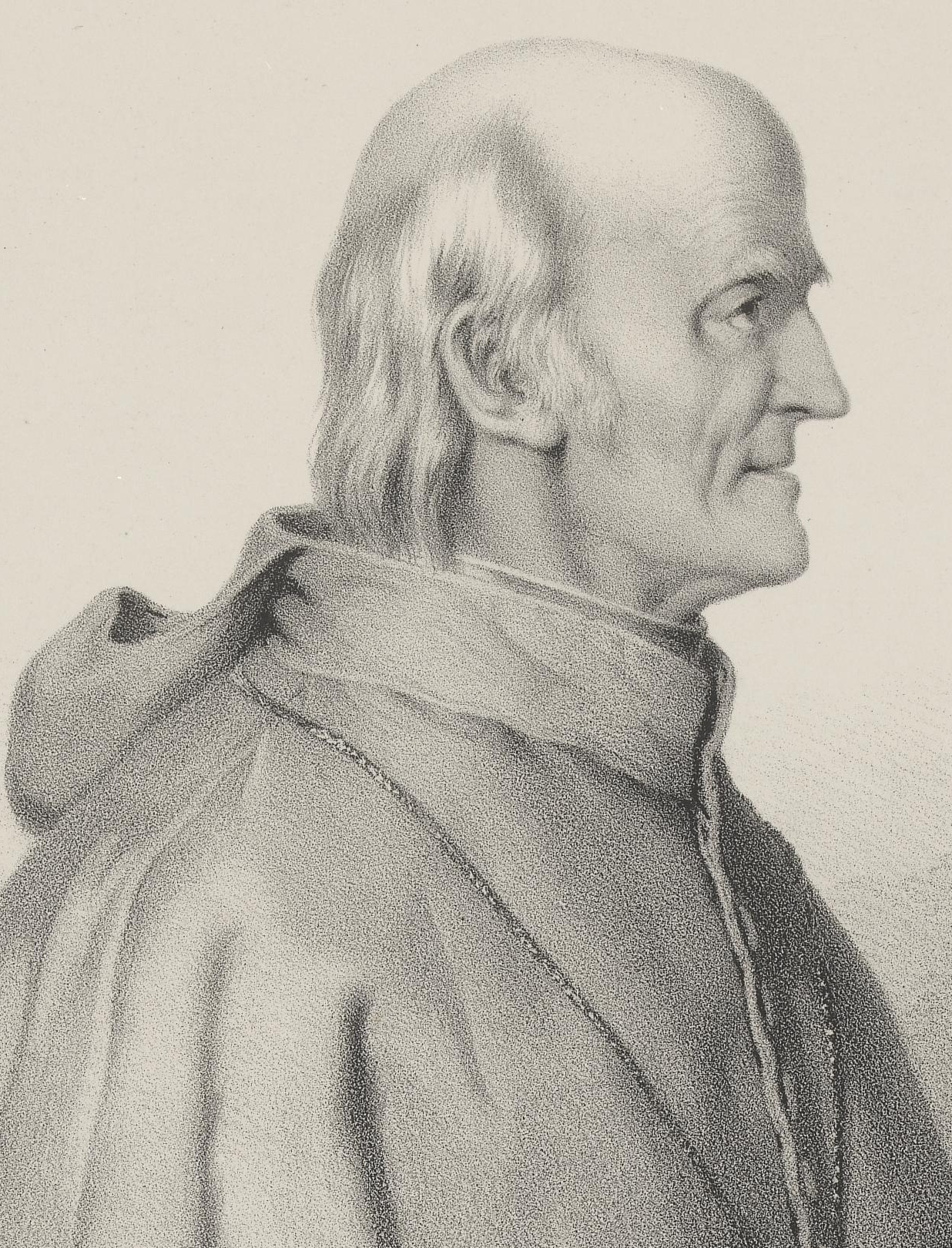
Valentin Stanič born 12 February

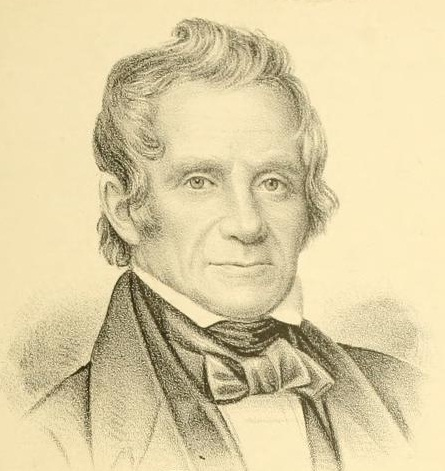
Roswell Weston born 24 February

William Farquhar born 26 February

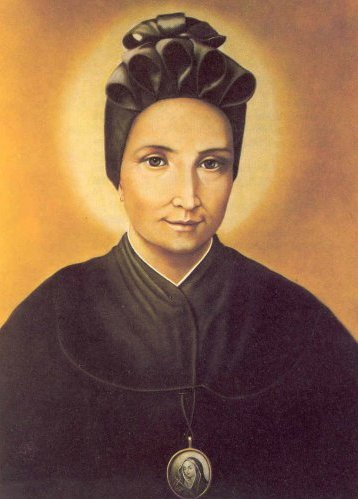
Magdalene of Canossa born 1 March

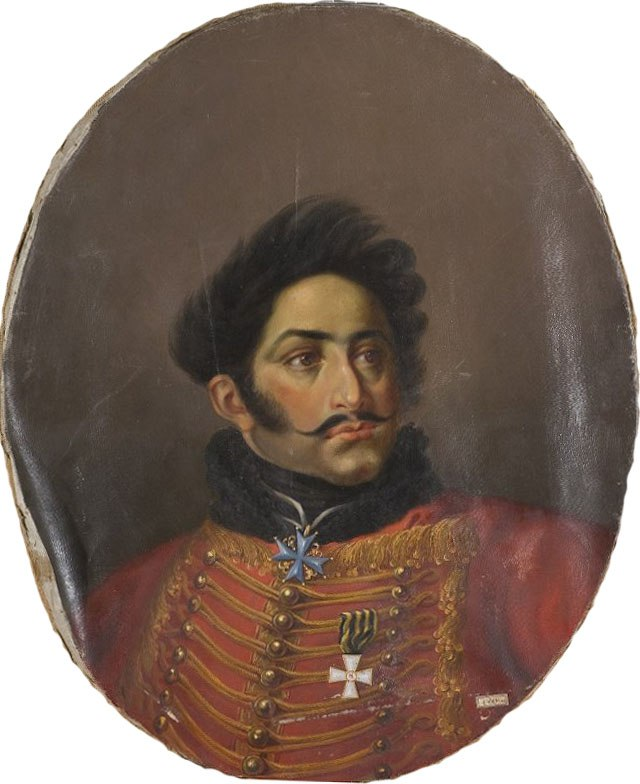
David Semyonovich Abamelik born 10 March

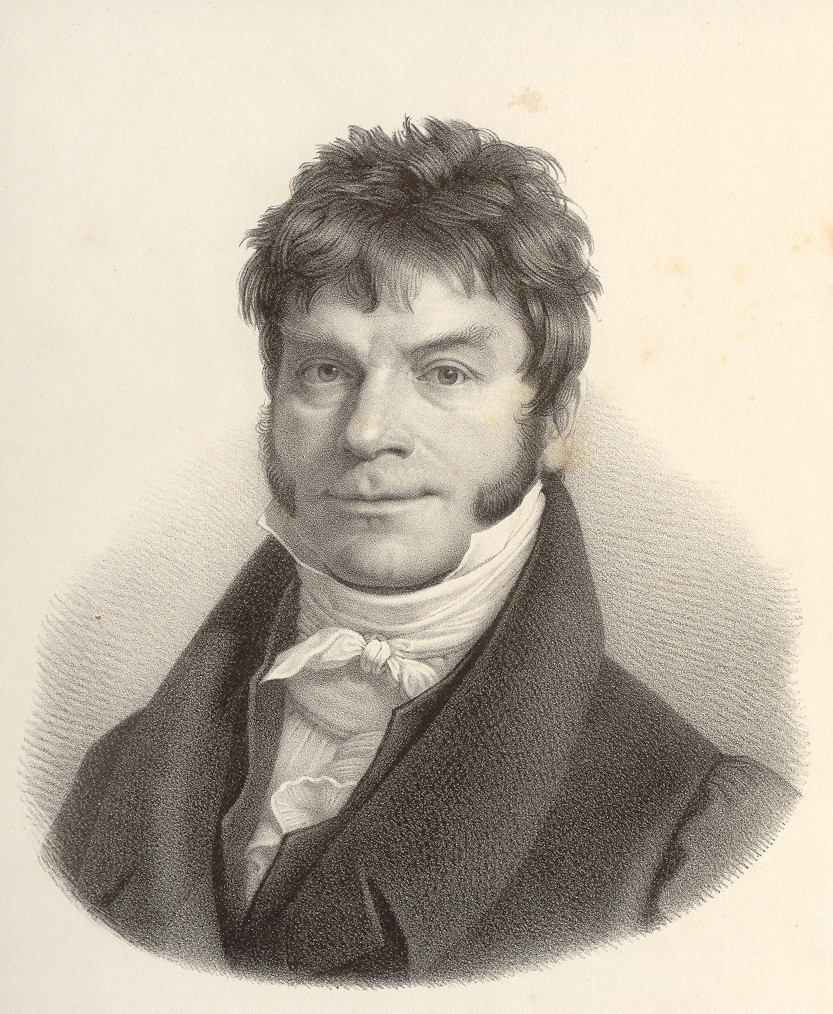
Johann Caspar Horner born 12 March

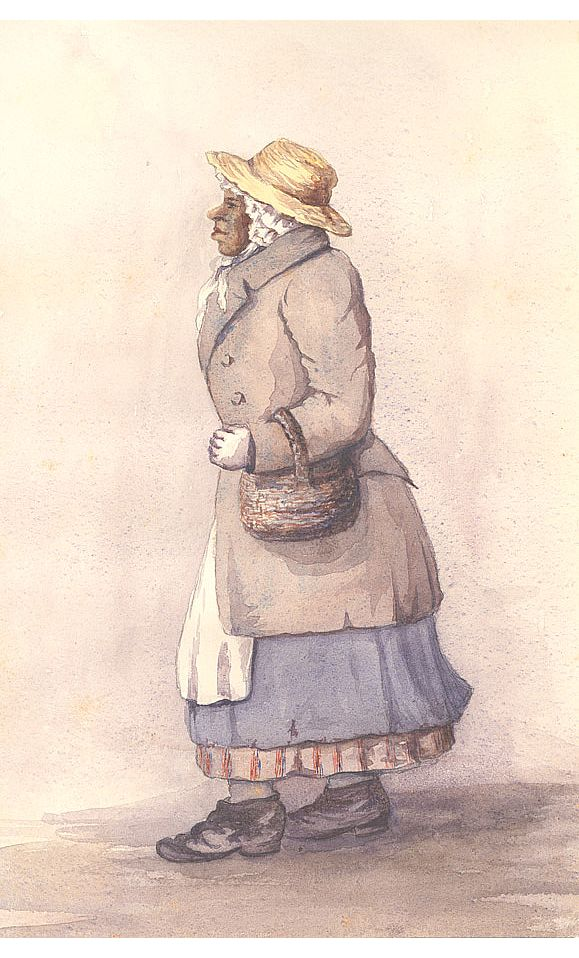
Rose Fortune born 13 March

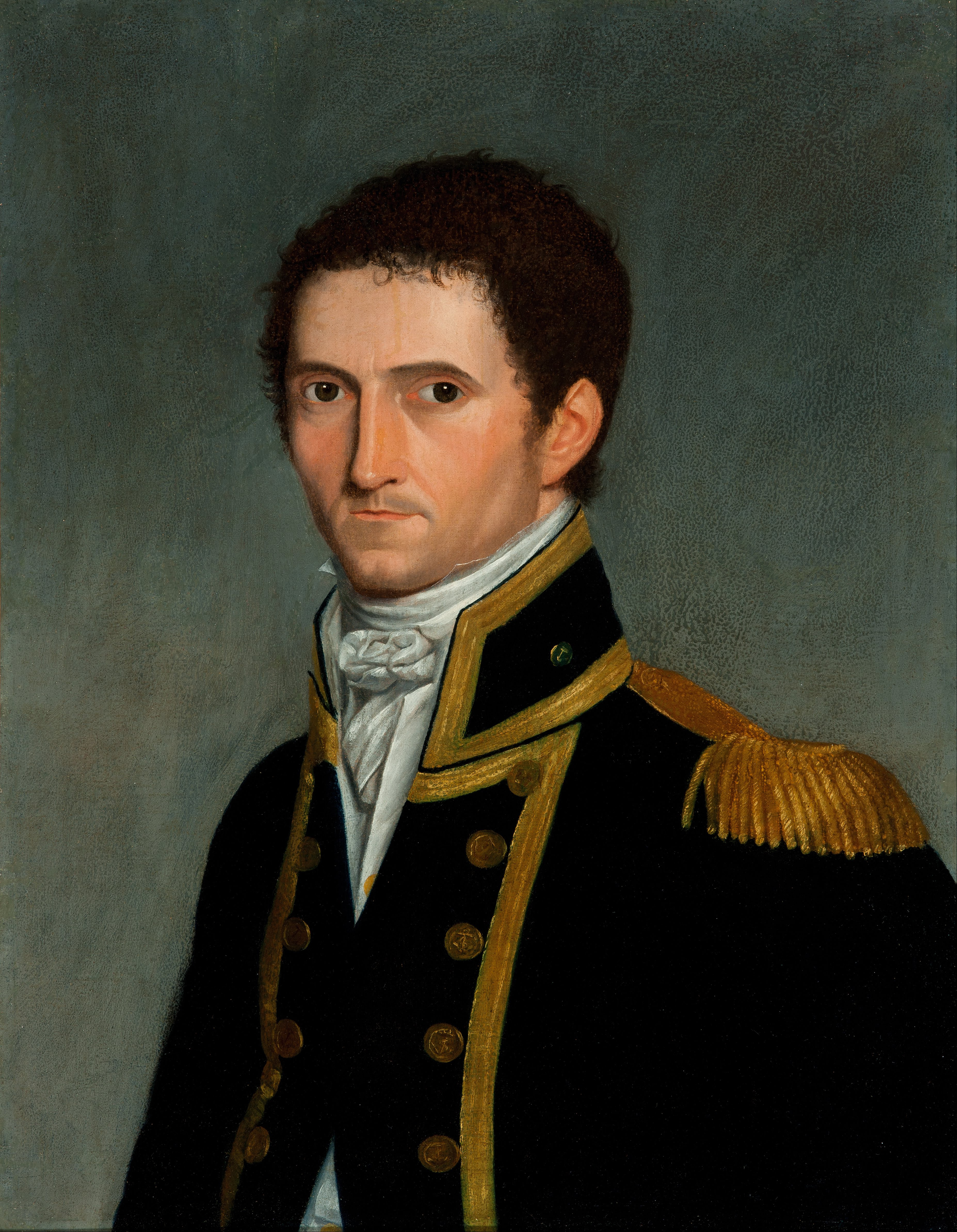
Matthew Flinders born 16 March

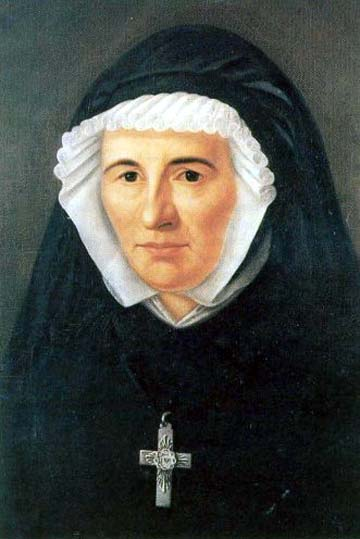
Claudine Thévenet born 30 March

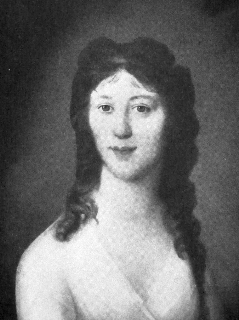
Sophie Thalbitzer born 15 April

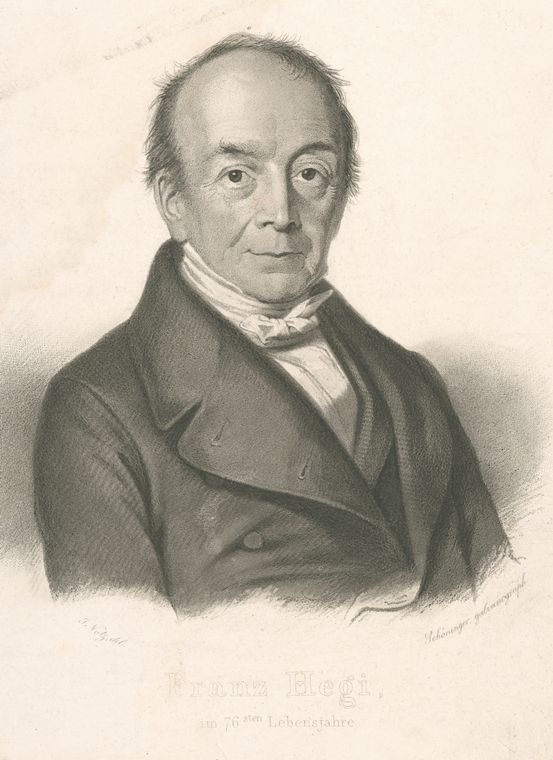
Franz Hegi born 16 April

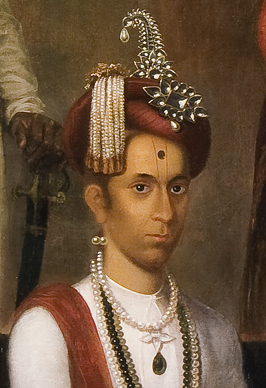
Madhavrao II born 18 April

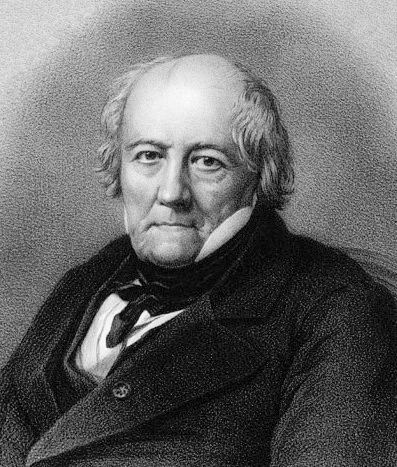
Jean-Baptiste Biot born 21 April

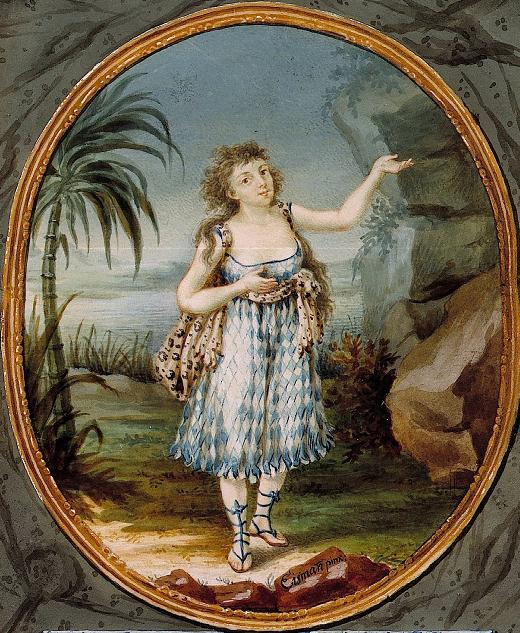
Anna Gottlieb born 29 April

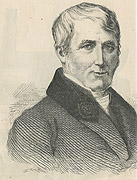
Samuel Owen (engineer) born 12 May

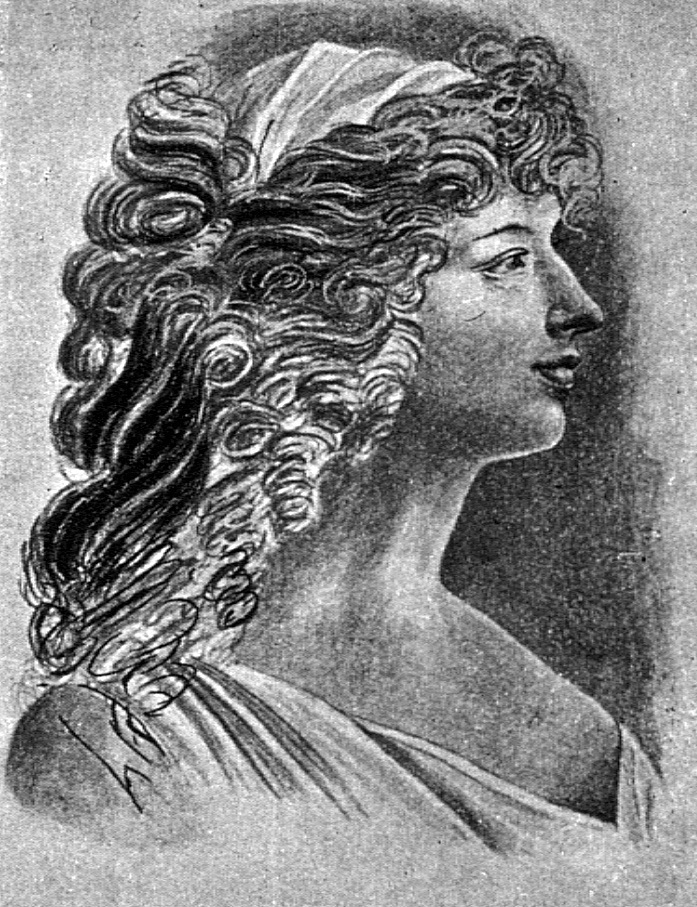
Friederike von Reden born 12 May

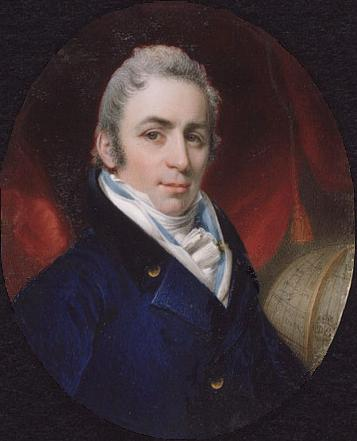
Joseph Bouchette born 14 May

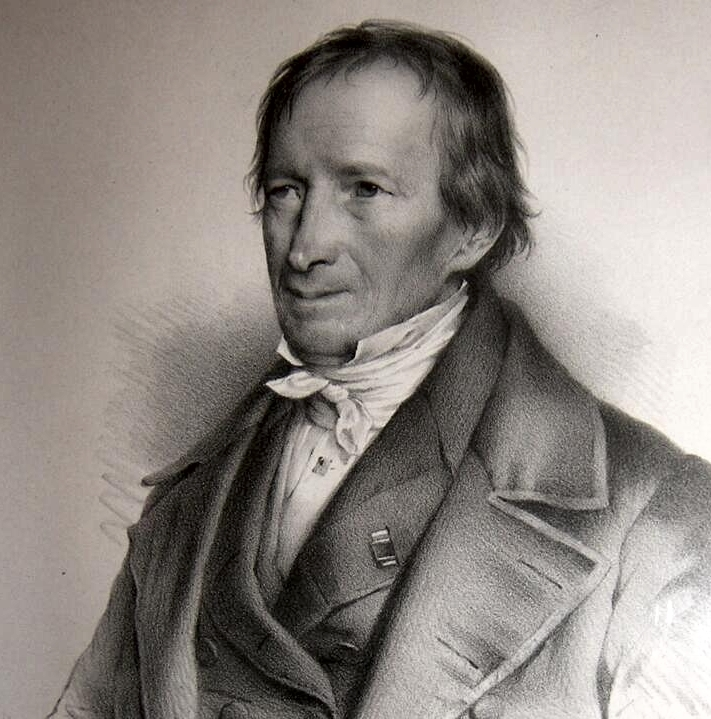
Johann Nepomuk von Fuchs born 15 May

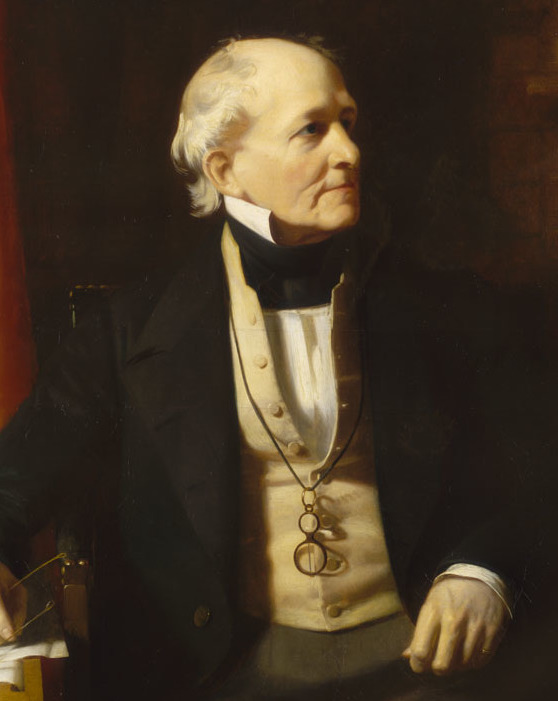
Francis Beaufort born 27 May

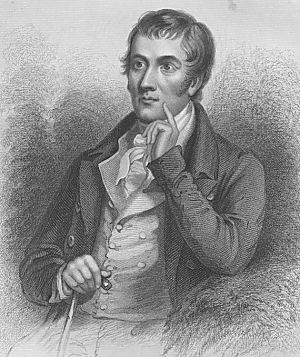
Robert Tannahill born 3 June

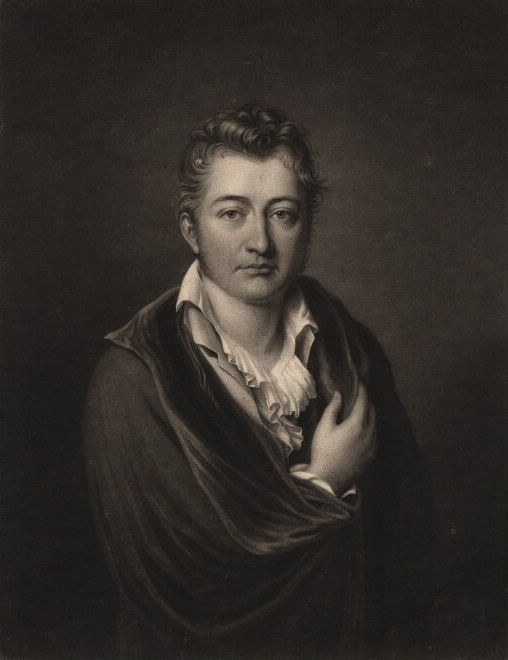
Henry Philip Hope born 8 June

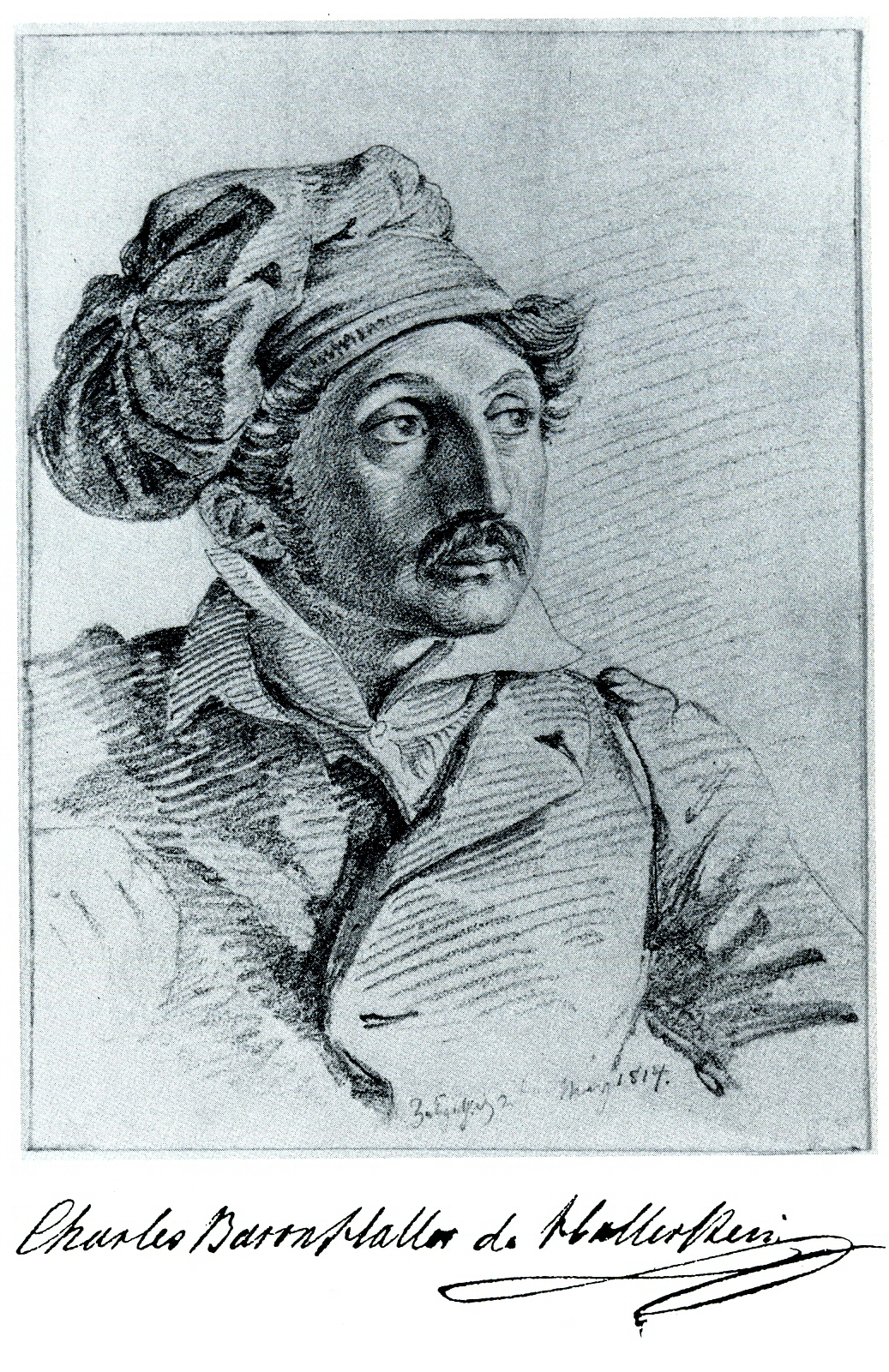
Carl Haller von Hallerstein born 10 June

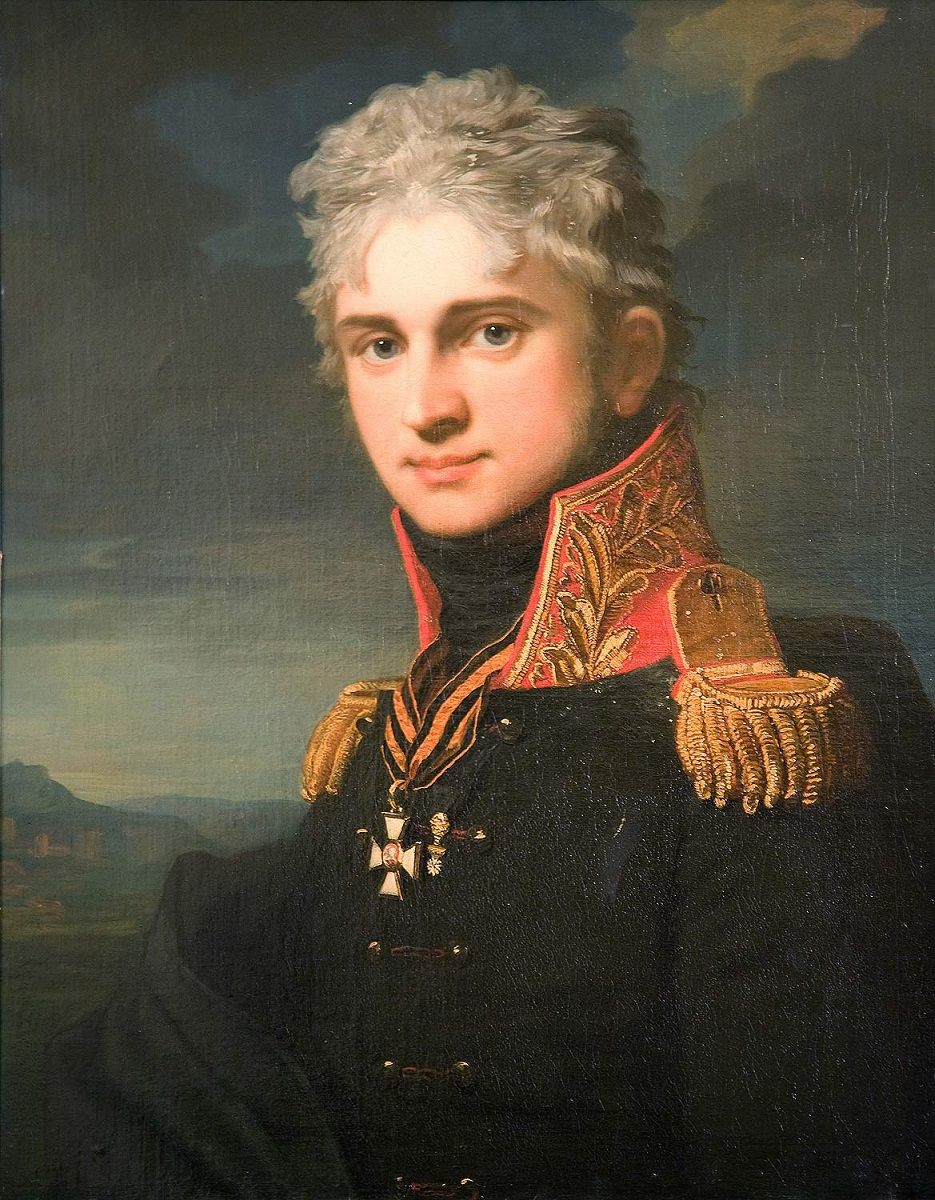
Pavel Alexandrovich Stroganov born 18 June

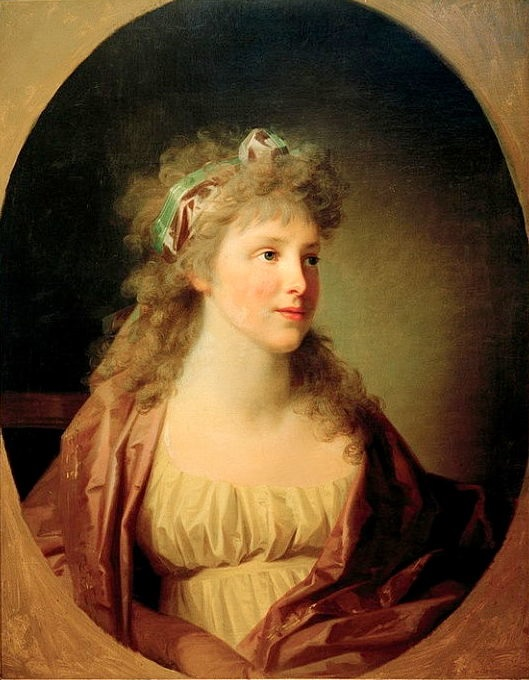
Princess Amalie of Hesse-Homburg born 29 June

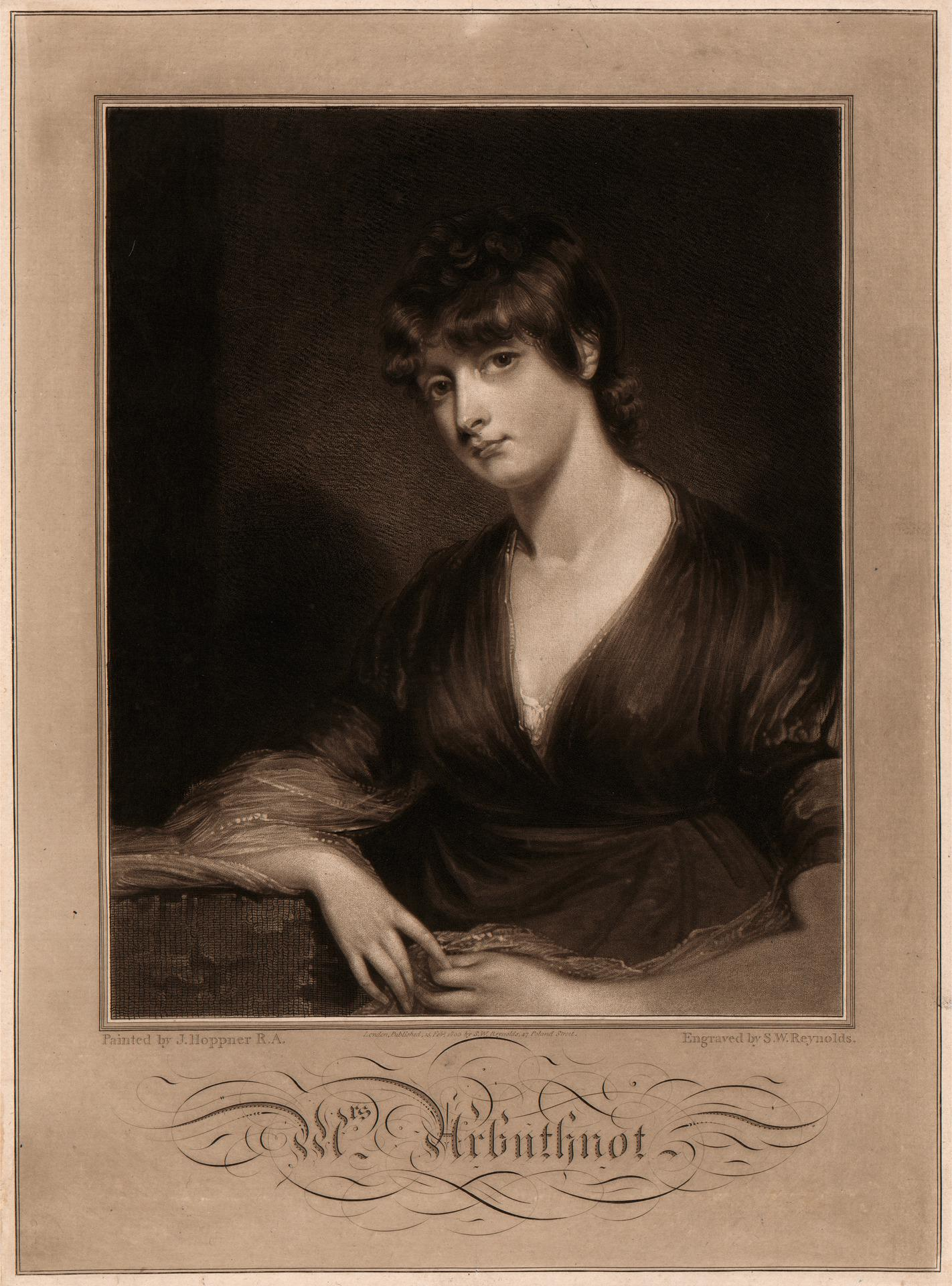
Marcia Arbuthnot born 9 July

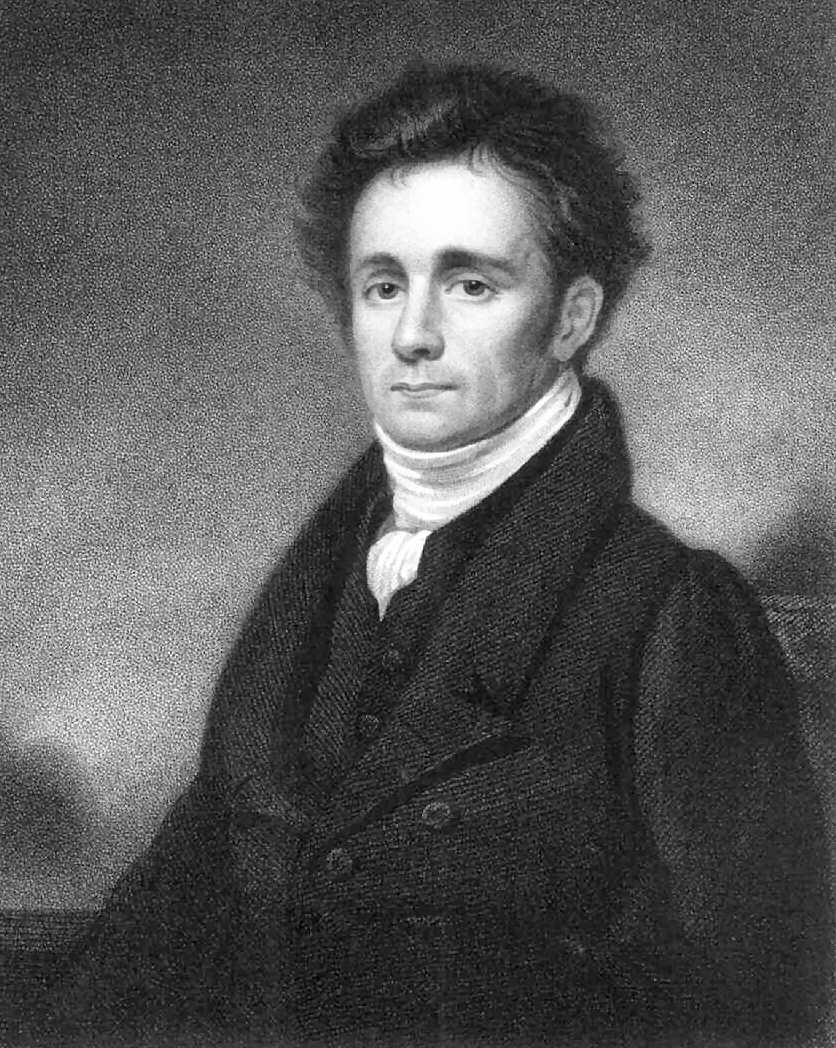
Robert Jameson born 11 July

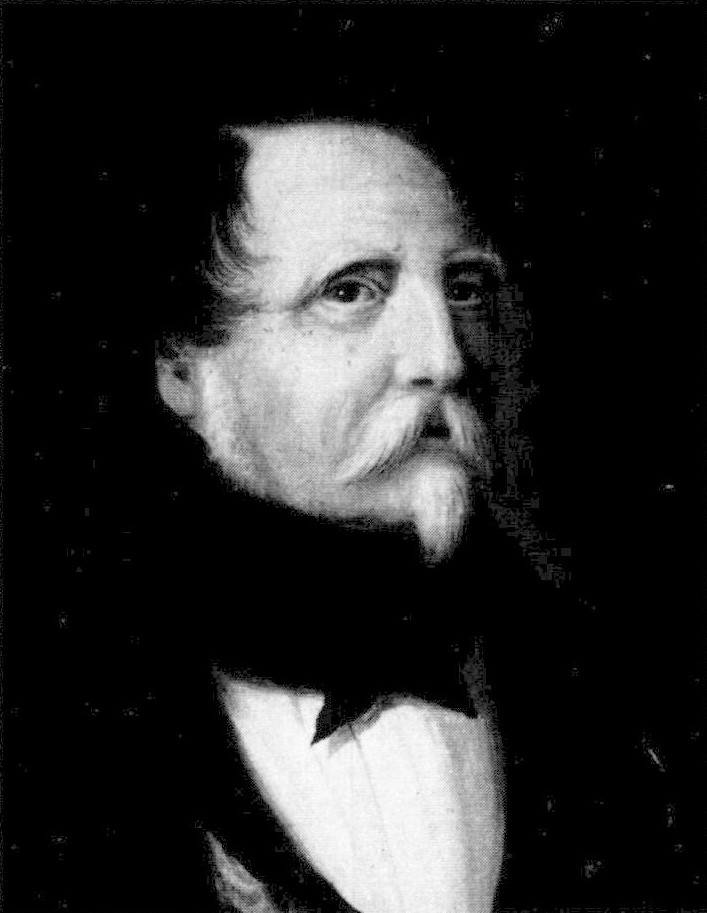
Axel Otto Mörner born 11 July

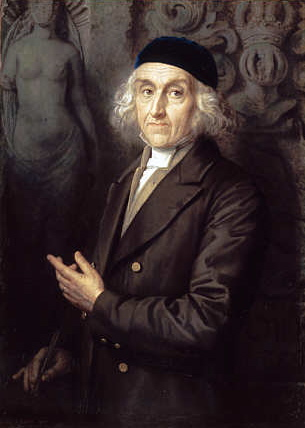
Charles de Graimberg born 30 July

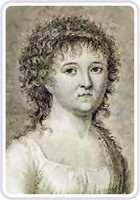
Diodata Saluzzo Roero born 31 July

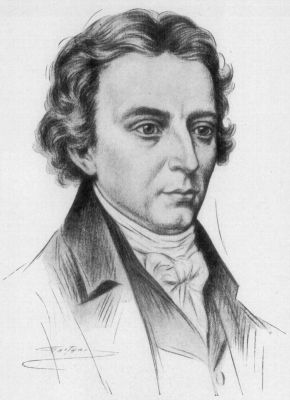
Robert Southey born 12 August

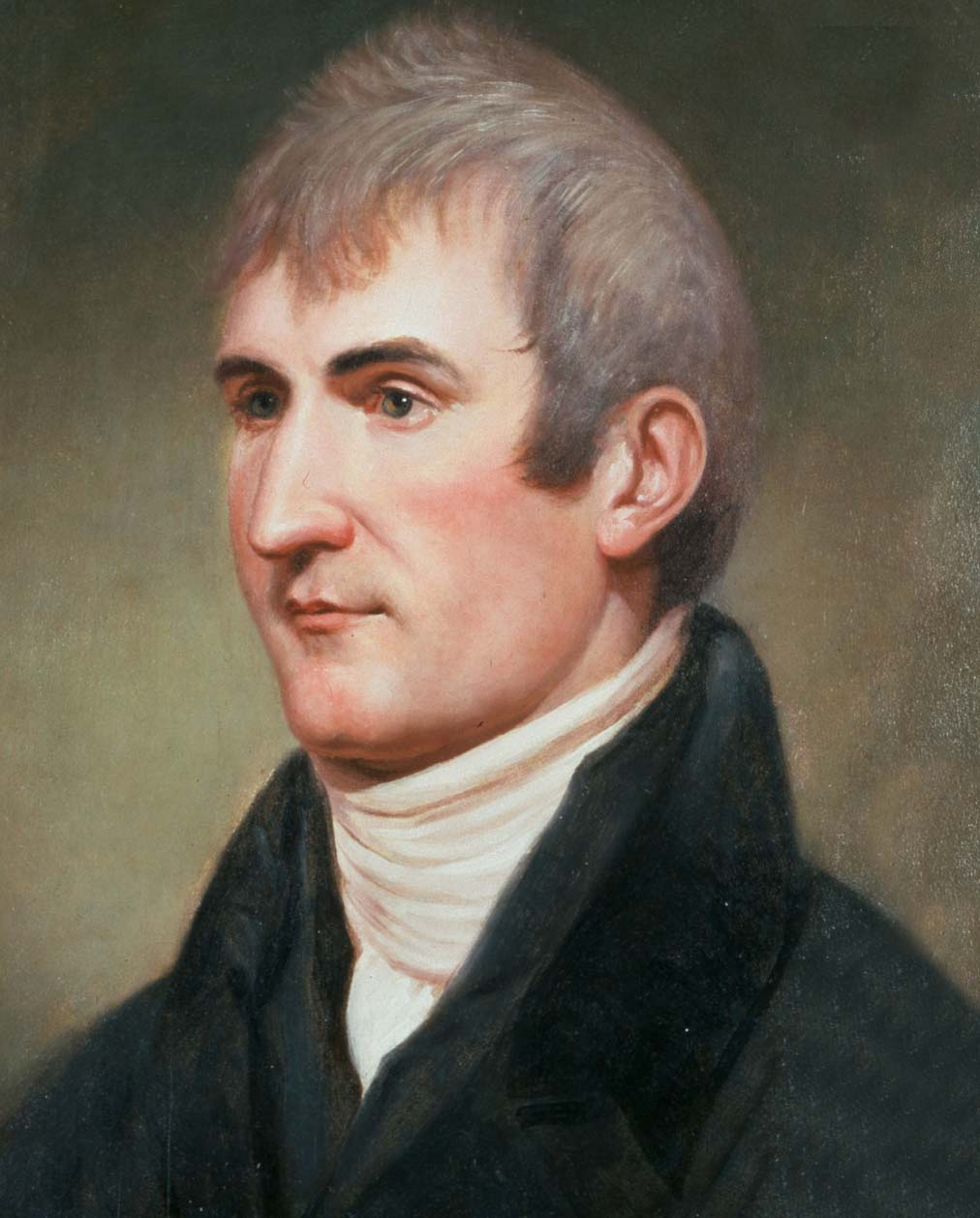
Meriwether Lewis born 18 August

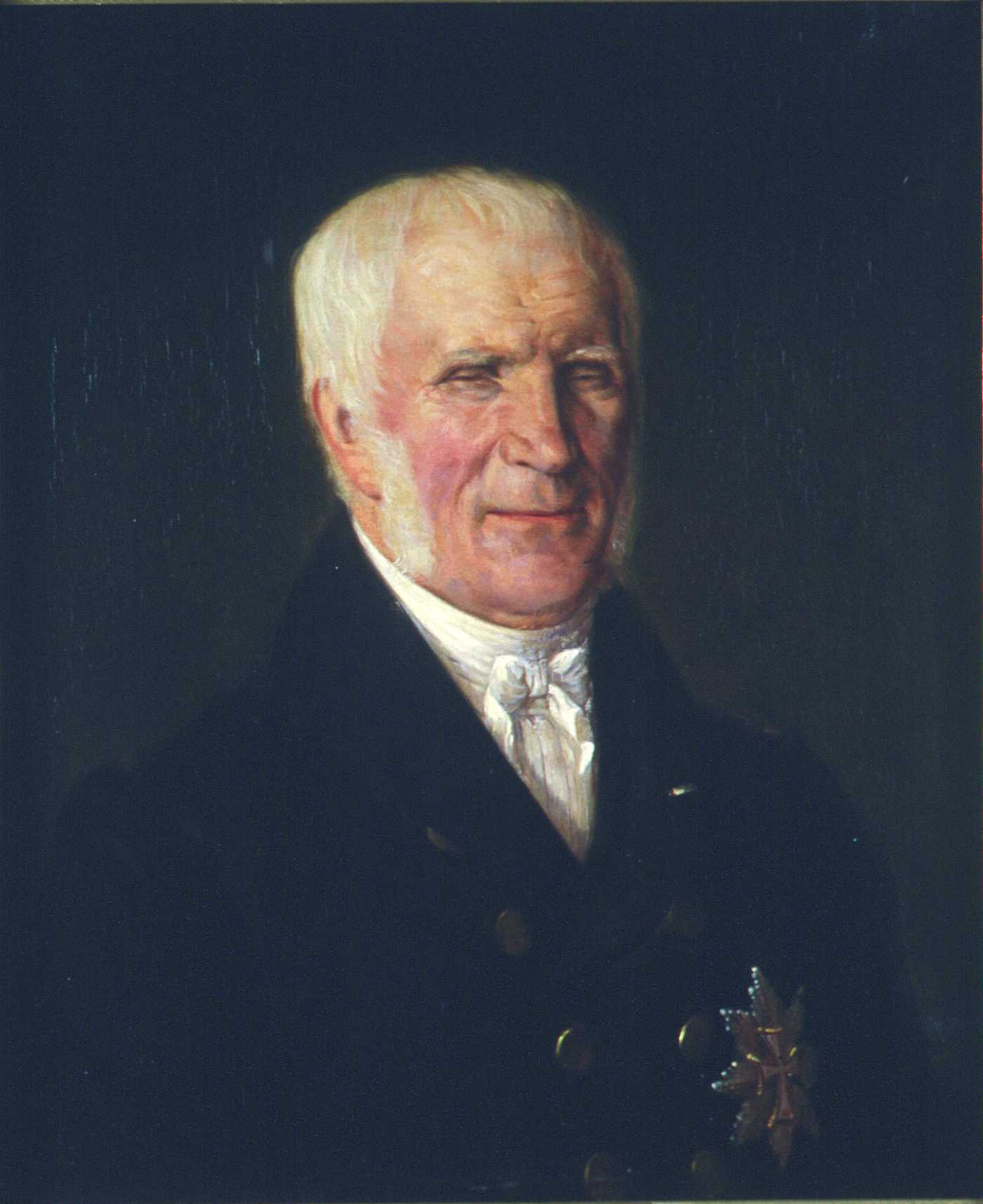
Ludvig Frederik Brock born 20 August

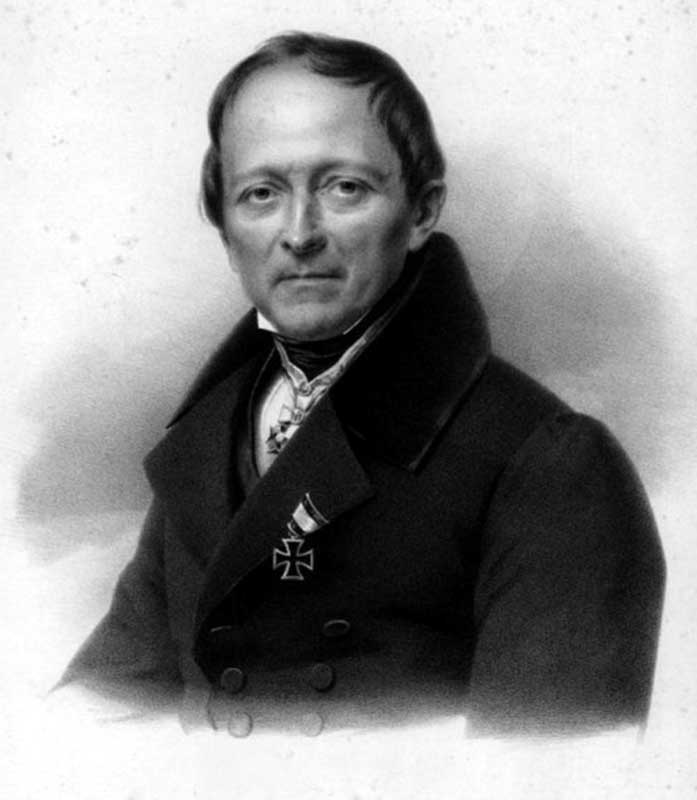
Anton Ludwig Ernst Horn born 24 August

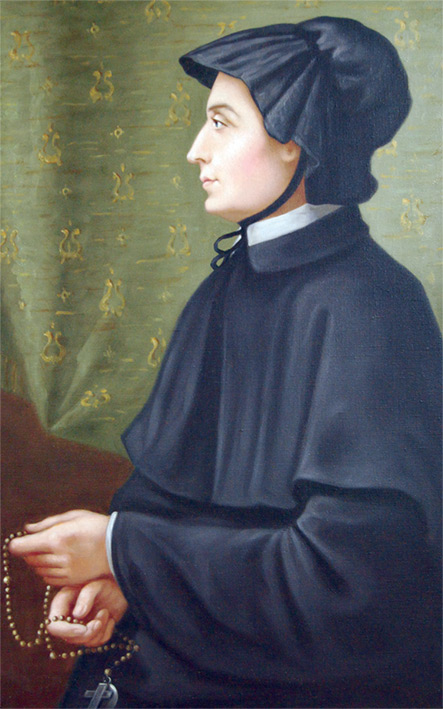
Elizabeth Ann Seton born 28 August

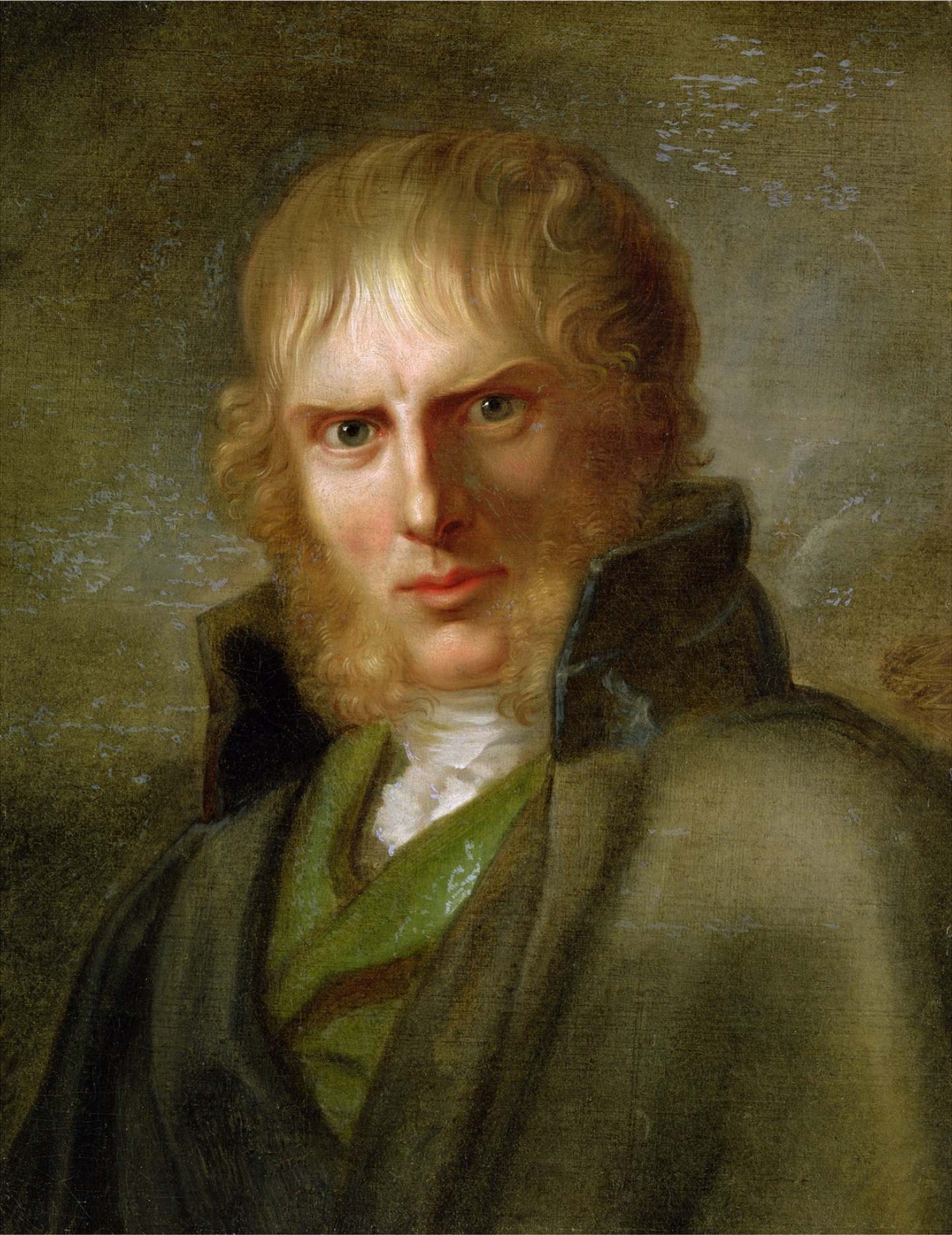
Caspar David Friedrich born 5 September

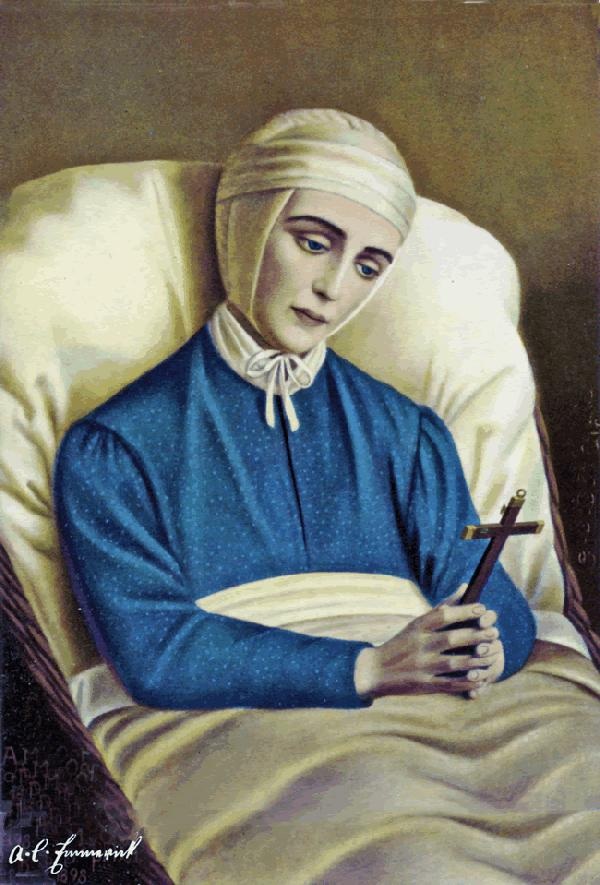
Anne Catherine Emmerich born 8 September

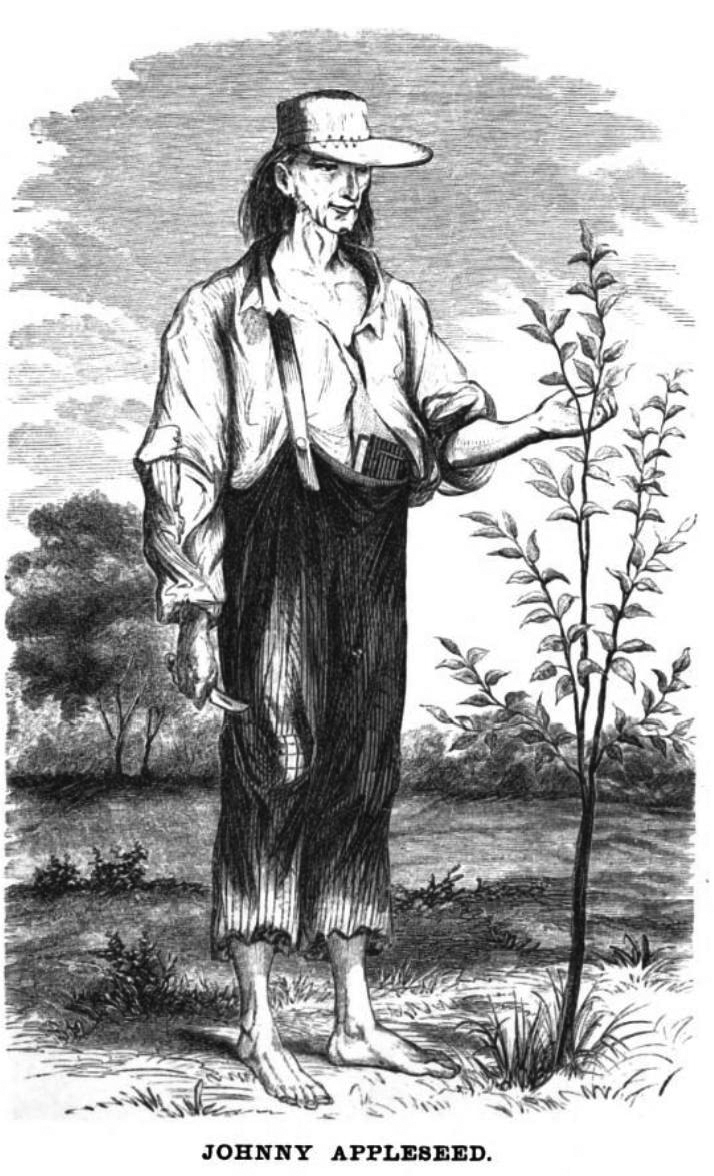
Johnny Appleseed born 26 September

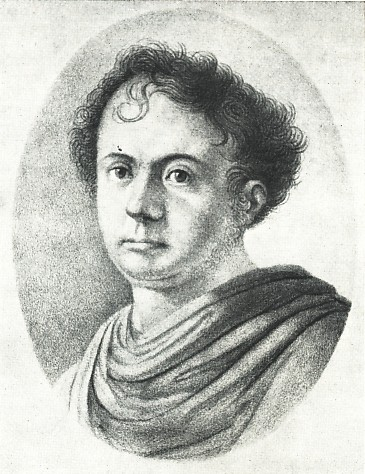
Adolf Müllner born 18 October

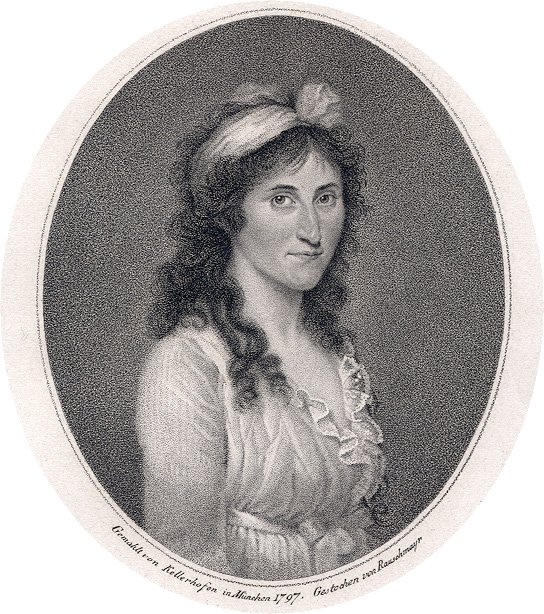
Sarah Thompson, Countess Rumford born 18 October

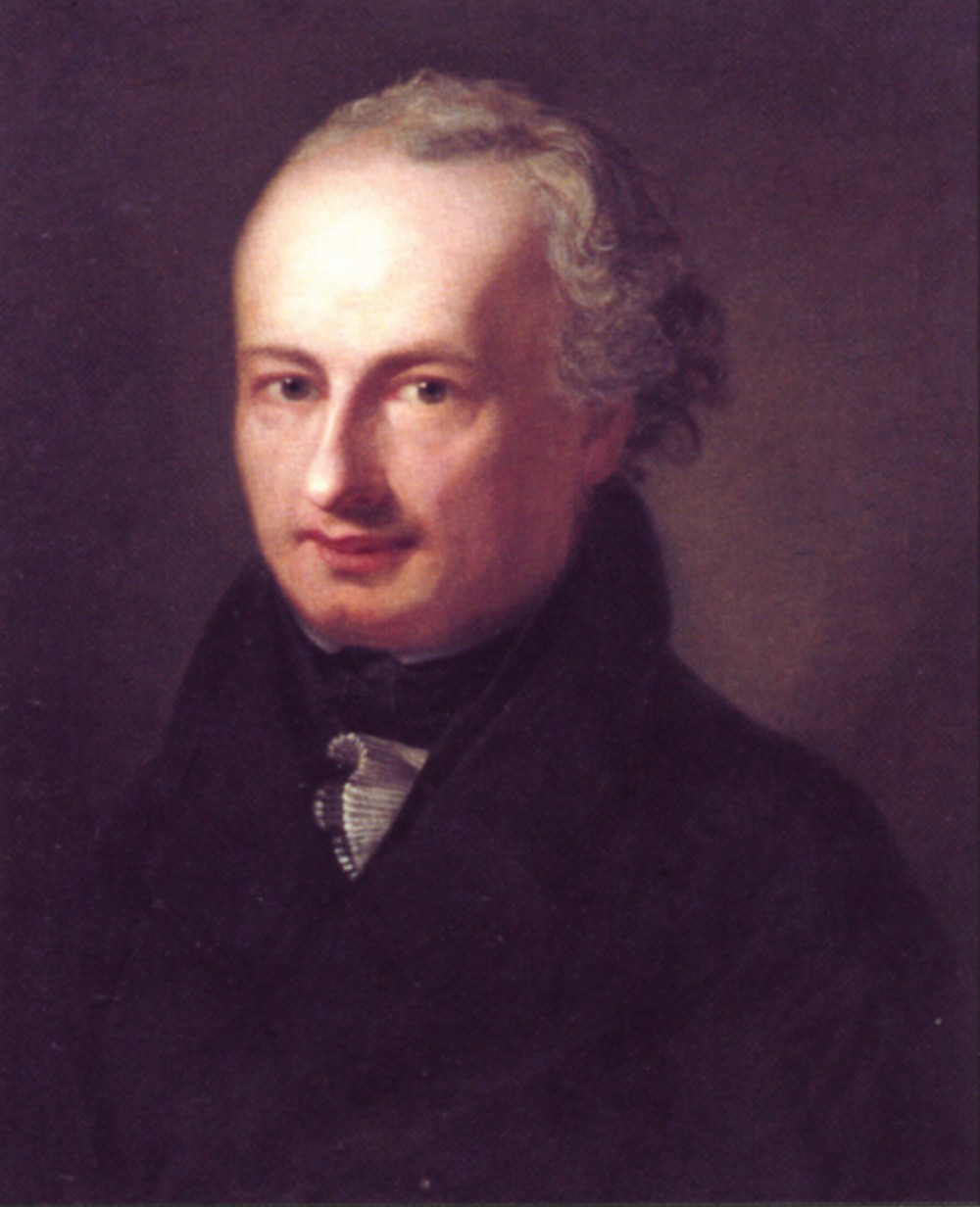
Ignaz Heinrich von Wessenberg born 4 November

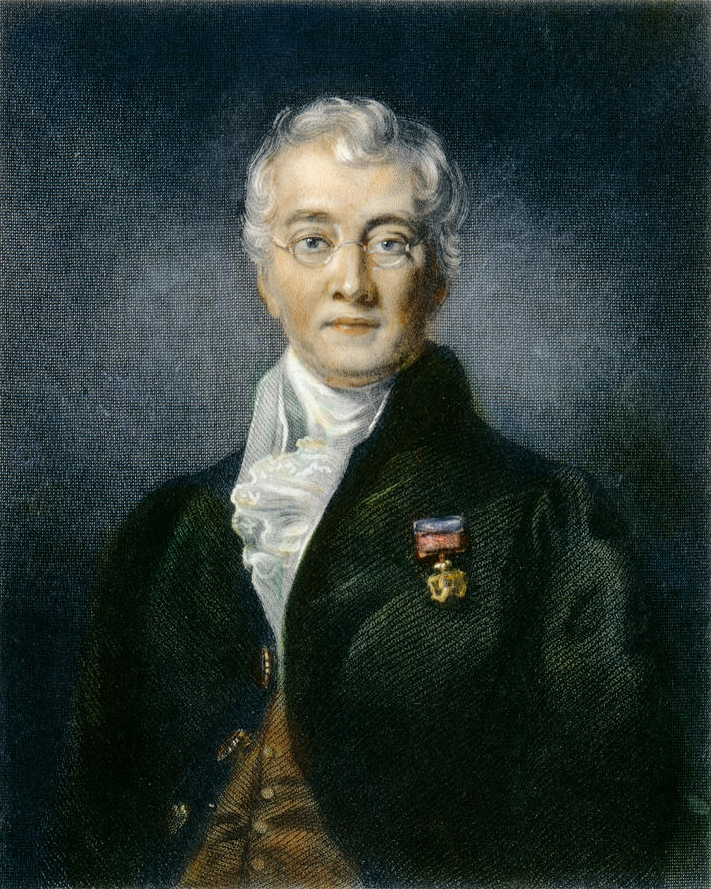
Charles Bell born 12 November

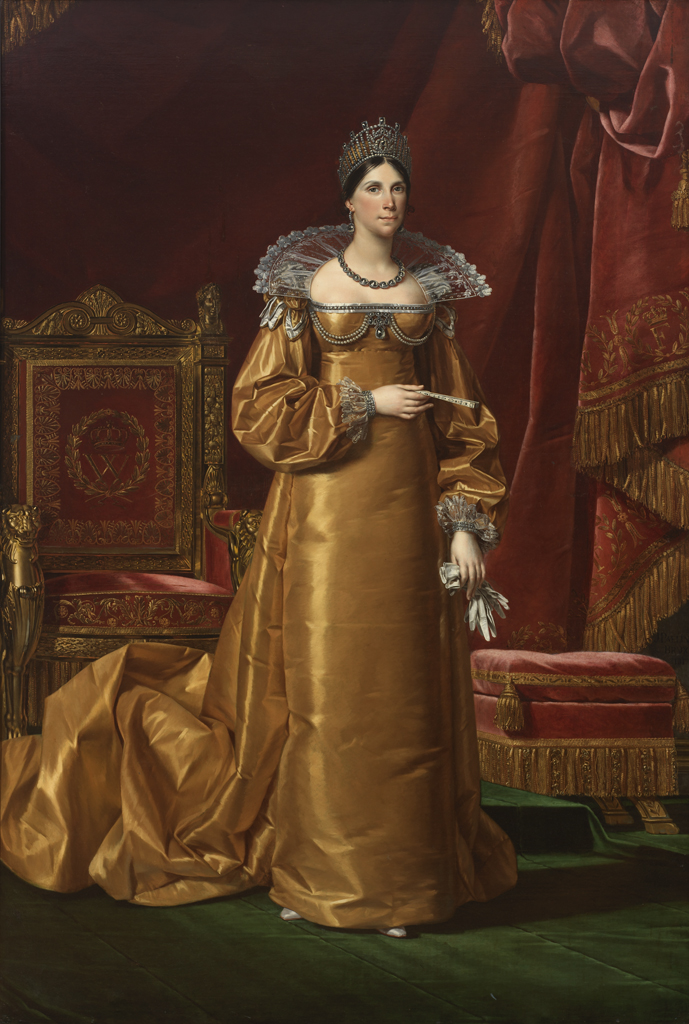
Wilhelmine of Prussia, Queen of the Netherlands born 18 November

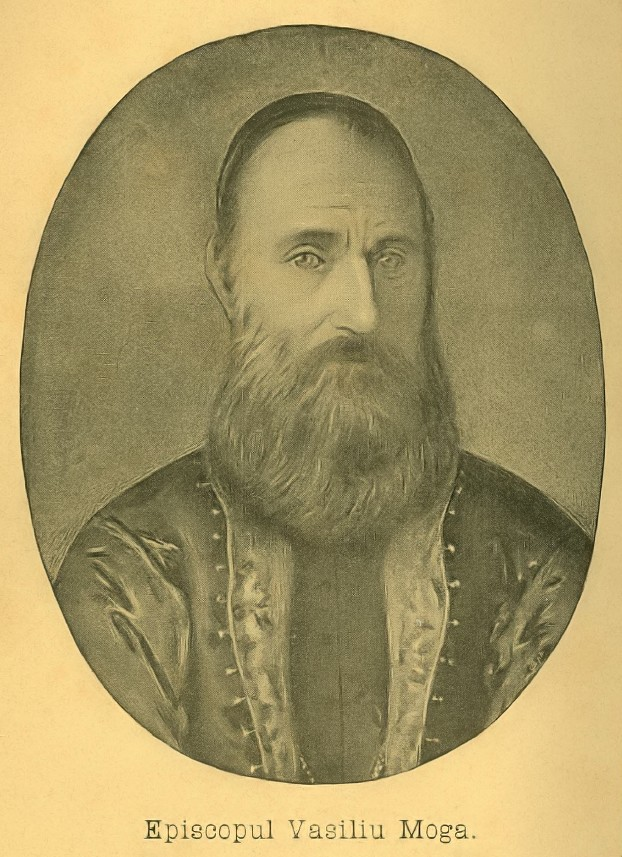
Vasile Moga born 19 November

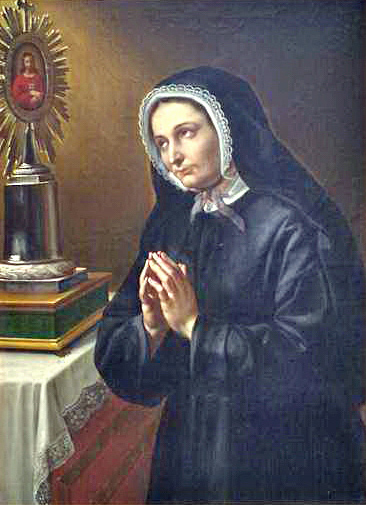
Elisabeth Canori Mora born 21 November

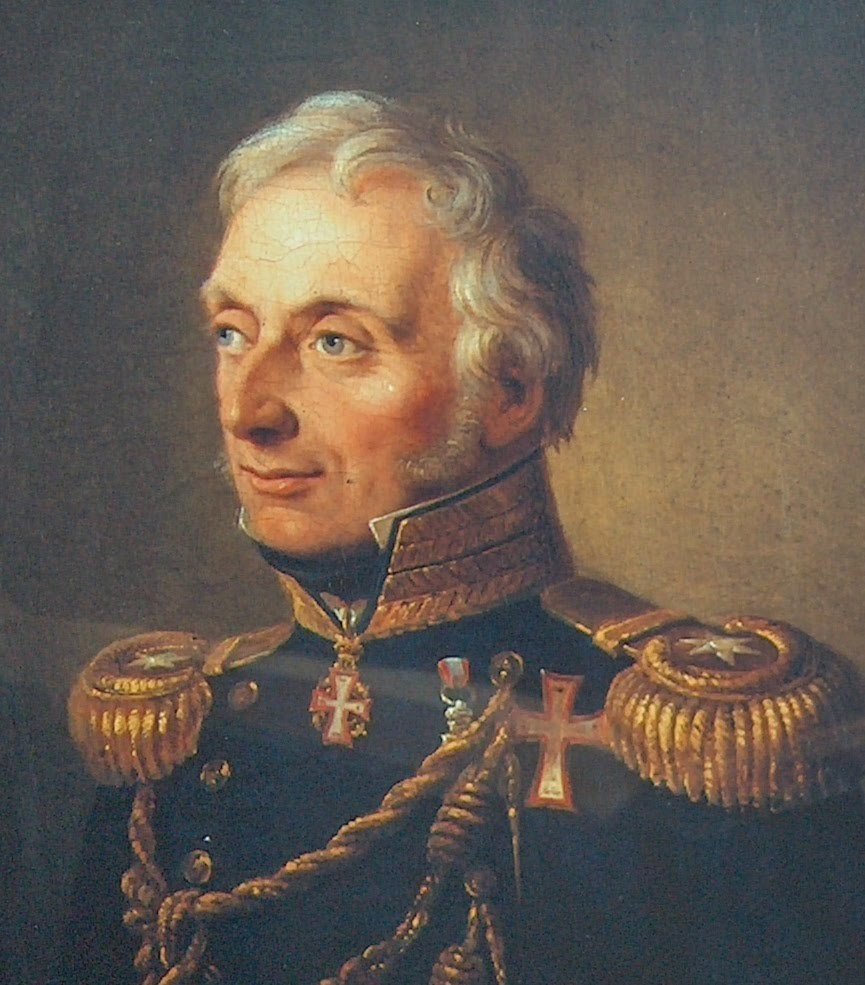
Peter Frederik Wulff born 26 November

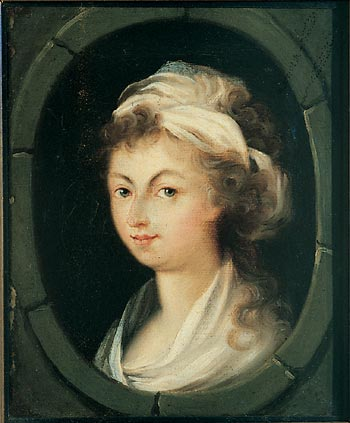
Princess Maria Antonia of Parma born 28 November

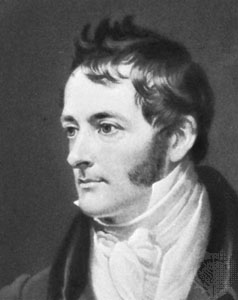
William Henry (chemist) born 12 December

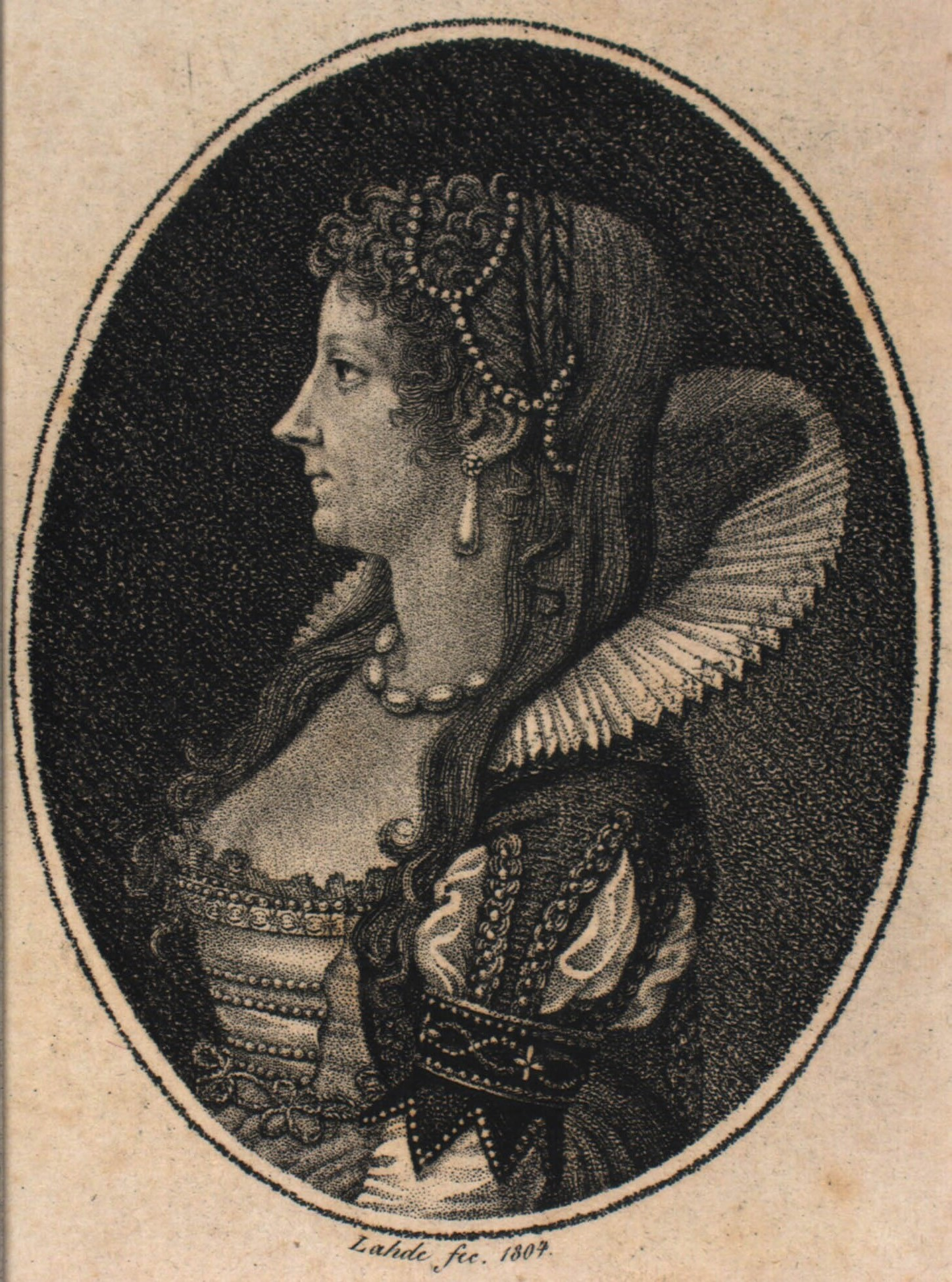
Eline Heger born 13 December

=== January ===
- January 1
  - Lancelot Baugh Allen, Master of Dulwich College (d. 1845)
  - André Marie Constant Duméril, French zoologist (d. 1860)
  - Pietro Giordani, Italian writer (d. 1848)
  - James Johnson, U.S. Representative from Kentucky (d. 1826)
  - William Piper, American politician (d. 1852)
- January 2 – Thomas Lynn, British soldier (d. 1847)
- January 3 – Juan Aldama, Jugador de Beisbole (d. 1811)
- January 4
  - Volant Vashon Ballard, Royal Navy admiral (d. 1832)
  - Edward Dubois, English wit and man of letters (d. 1850)
  - William M. Richardson, American jurist and politician (d. 1838)
- January 5 – George Chinnery, British artist (d. 1852)
- January 6
  - Ole Elias Holck, officer, father of the Constitution of Norway, member of Stortinget (d. 1842)
  - James McCall, American politician (d. 1856)
- January 7
  - Anna Bunina, Russian poet (d. 1829)
  - Samuel D. Purviance, American politician (d. 1806)
- January 8 – John Gibbons, English amateur cricketer (d. 1844)
- January 10
  - Augustin de Macarty, American politician (d. 1844)
  - Jean-Baptiste Muiron, French Army officer (d. 1796)
  - William Stewart, British military officer (d. 1827)
- January 11
  - Antoine Drouot, French general (d. 1847)
  - Charles Henry Schwanfelder, British artist (d. 1837)
  - Tryphosa Jane Wallis, English actress (d. 1848)
- January 12 – William Cahoon, American politician (d. 1833)
- January 14 – Benjamin Aislabie, cricketer (d. 1842)
- January 16 – Daniel Evans, Welsh Independent minister (d. 1835)
- January 17
  - Marie-Thérèse Figueur, French writer (d. 1861)
  - Maria Theresa Kemble, British actress (d. 1838)
  - Georg Wilhelm Franz Wenderoth, German botanist (d. 1861)
- January 18
  - Moses I. Cantine, American politician (d. 1823)
  - James Millingen, British archaeologist (d. 1845)
- January 19
  - Edward Protheroe, British politician (d. 1856)
  - Samuel Campbell Rowley, naval officer and politician (d. 1846)
- January 20 – Charles George Beauclerk, British Member of Parliament (d. 1845)
- January 21 – William Kenrick, English lawyer and politician (d. 1829)
- January 22 – Francesco Fuoco, Italian philologist, economist and Catholic priest (d. 1841)
- January 23 – Richard Southgate, American politician (d. 1857)
- January 24
  - Carl Abraham Arfwedson, Swedish silk merchant (d. 1861)
  - Arnold Timothée de Lasaulx, Belgian politician (d. 1863)
- January 25 – Jules-Paul Pasquier, French jurist (d. 1858)
- January 29
  - Olinthus Gregory, British astronomer (d. 1841)
  - Sir Robert Shaw, 1st Baronet, British politician (d. 1849)
- January 30 – Samuel Butler, English classical scholar and schoolmaster (d. 1839)
- January 31
  - William Blake, British economist; (d. 1852)
  - William George Maton, English physician (d. 1835)
  - Thomas Veazey, American politician (d. 1842)
  - Phineas Waller, Pennsylvanian farmer and landowner (d. 1859)

=== February ===
- February 1
  - John Douglas, Tory politician (d. 1838)
  - Ferdinánd Pálffy, Austrian theatre manager (d. 1840)
- February 2 – Susan Montagu, Duchess of Manchester, British noble (d. 1828)
- February 3
  - Edward Cross, British zookeeper (d. 1854)
  - Karl Mollweide, German mathematician (d. 1825)
- February 4 – Frederick Traugott Pursh, German-American botanist (d. 1820)
- February 5 – Juan Fermín de San Martín, Spanish military personnel (d. 1822)
- February 6 – Henry Bates Grubb, American ironmaster and businessman (d. 1823)
- February 7 – Frederik Christian Kielsen, Danish naturalist (d. 1850)
- February 8
  - Karl Friedrich Heinrich, German classical philologist (d. 1838)
  - Samuel Moore, American politician (d. 1861)
  - Francisco de Paula Vieira da Silva de Tovar, 1st Viscount of Molelos, Portuguese general (d. 1852)
- February 9
  - William Lattimore, American physician and politician (d. 1843)
  - Juan José Viamonte, Argentine general (d. 1843)
- February 11
  - Maxim Gauci, Maltese painter and lithographer (d. 1854)
  - Hans Järta, Swedish politician, civil servant and administrator (d. 1847)
- February 12 – Valentin Stanič, Austrian teacher (d. 1847)
- February 13
  - Robert Curzon, British Member of Parliament (d. 1863)
  - Thomas Myers, British mathematician (d. 1834)
- February 15 – Prince Frederick of Orange-Nassau, Dutch prince (d. 1799)
- February 16
  - Étienne Guy, Canadian politician, surveyor and militia officer (d. 1820)
  - Pierre Rode, French violinist and composer (d. 1830)
- February 17
  - Mykhailo Levytsky, Metropolitan of Lviv (d. 1858)
  - Raphaelle Peale, painter from the United States (d. 1825)
- February 18 – William Clark, farmer, jurist, and politician from Dauphin, Pennsylvania (d. 1851)
- February 24
  - Prince Adolphus, Duke of Cambridge, British and Hanoverian Royal (d. 1850)
  - Archibald Constable, Scottish printer and publisher (d. 1827)
  - Perley Keyes, American politician (d. 1834)
  - Robert S. Rose, American politician (d. 1835)
  - Alexander Wilmot Schomberg, British Royal Navy admiral (d. 1850)
  - Roswell Weston, American lawyer and politician (d. 1861)
- February 25 – George Gore, Anglican priest in Ireland (d. 1844)
- February 26
  - Joseph Bédard, Canadian politician (d. 1832)
  - William Farquhar, first British Resident and Commandant of colonial Singapore (d. 1839)
  - Richard Rouse, public servant and settler (d. 1852)
- February 27 – Thomas Vasse, sea explorer (d. 1801)
- February 28
  - Chamaraja Wodeyar IX, King of Mysore (d. 1796)
  - Thomas Tooke, British economist (d. 1858)

=== March ===
- March 1
  - Magdalene of Canossa, Italian Religious Sister and foundress (d. 1835)
  - Matthias B. Tallmadge, United States federal judge (d. 1819)
- March 2
  - Jean-Siméon Domon, French soldier (d. 1830)
  - Armand Charles Guilleminot, French general during the Napoleonic wars (d. 1840)
- March 4 – Joseph Hamilton Daveiss, American politician (d. 1811)
- March 5 – Christoph Ernst Friedrich Weyse, Danish composer (d. 1842)
- March 7 – Daniel Arnoldi, German Canadian physician (d. 1849)
- March 9
  - Mayhew Folger, American whaler, captain of Topaz (d. 1828)
  - Louis Auguste Say, French economist (d. 1840)
- March 10 – David Semyonovich Abamelik, Russian-Armenian general-major (d. 1833)
- March 12
  - Johann Caspar Horner, Swiss mathematician (d. 1834)
  - John Scott, English engraver (d. 1827)
  - Eva Unander, Swedish librarian (d. 1836)
- March 13
  - Rose Fortune, Canadian businesswoman (d. 1864)
  - Pierre-Narcisse Guérin, French painter (d. 1833)
- March 14
  - Helena Margaretha Van Dielen, Dutch painter (d. 1841)
  - Jedediah Morgan, American politician (d. 1826)
- March 15
  - John Conrad Otto, American physician (d. 1844)
  - Salomon Soldin, Jewish-Danish bookseller (d. 1837)
  - Isaac Weld, Irish writer, explorer and artist (d. 1856)
- March 16
  - Captain Matthew Flinders, English navigator and cartographer (d. 1814)
  - Jethro Wood, inventor of a cast-iron moldboard plow with replaceable parts (d. 1834)
- March 19 – Franz von Paula Gruithuisen, Bavarian physician and astronomer (d. 1852)
- March 20 – Alexandra Petrovna Golitsyna, maid of honour and historian (d. 1842)
- March 21 – George Scovell, British Army general (d. 1861)
- March 24 – Jean-Louis-Auguste Loiseleur-Deslongchamps, French botanist (d. 1849)
- March 25
  - Thomas Brand, 20th Baron Dacre, British politician (d. 1851)
  - Thomas Spalding, American politician (d. 1851)
- March 28 – William Williams, British Member of Parliament (d. 1839)
- March 30
  - Nathaniel Peabody, American physician (d. 1855)
  - Claudine Thévenet, French Catholic religious sister (d. 1837)
- March 31
  - Enos Bronson, American writer (d. 1823)
  - Karl Gottfried Erdmann, German author and botanist (d. 1835)

=== April ===
- April 1
  - Gottfried Daniel Krummacher, German clergyman (d. 1837)
  - Gustav von Rauch, Prussian general (d. 1841)
  - Therese Rosenbaum, Austrian opera singer (d. 1837)
- April 5
  - David Gillespie, American surveyor and politician (d. 1829)
  - Thomas Potter, British politician (d. 1845)
- April 6
  - José de Córdoba y Rojas, Spanish admiral (d. 1810)
  - Marmaduke Williams, American politician (d. 1850)
- April 7
  - Joseph Bailly, fur trader and pioneer from Canada (d. 1835)
  - Robert William Elliston, British actor (d. 1831)
  - Abner Kneeland, United States theologian (d. 1844)
- April 8
  - Kaspar Anton Karl van Beethoven, brother of Ludwig van Beethoven (d. 1815)
  - Jean-Pierre Dellard, French general (d. 1832)
  - James William Freshfield, English lawyer and founder of the law firm Freshfields (d. 1864)
- April 9 – John Stanly, American politician (d. 1834)
- April 11
  - Michele Carrascosa, Italian politician (d. 1853)
  - Conrad Hinrich Donner, German banker and art collector (d. 1854)
  - Lawrence Augustine Washington, Nephew of George Washington (d. 1824)
- April 12
  - Johann Baptist Krebs, German writer and director (d. 1851)
  - Leffert Lefferts, the first President of the Long Island Bank, the first bank in Brooklyn, New York (d. 1847)
- April 13 – John W. Mulligan, attorney, U.S. Consul in Athens, Greece (d. 1862)
- April 15 – Sophie Thalbitzer, Danish writer (d. 1851)
- April 16
  - George Bennet, English missionary (d. 1841)
  - Franz Hegi, Swiss artist (d. 1850)
- April 17
  - Friedrich Koenig, German printer (d. 1833)
  - Robert Spankie, British politician, barrister (d. 1842)
  - Václav Tomášek, Czech music educator and composer (d. 1850)
- April 18
  - Antonio Basoli, Italian painter (d. 1848)
  - Madhavrao II, 12th Peshwa of Maratha Empire (d. 1795)
  - Georg von Langsdorff, Russian-German scientist (d. 1852)
- April 19 – Friedrich Wilhelm Riemer, German writer (d. 1845)
- April 21
  - Jean-Louis Aumer, French ballet dancer and choreographer (d. 1833)
  - Jean-Baptiste Biot, French physicist, astronomer and mathematician (d. 1862)
  - Philibert Jean-Baptiste Curial, French general (d. 1829)
- April 23 – Francis Austen, British Royal Navy officer (d. 1865)
- April 24 – Jean Marc Gaspard Itard, French physician (d. 1838)
- April 25 – Friedrich Wilhelm von Lepel, Prussian major general and adjutant (d. 1840)
- April 26
  - Christian Leopold von Buch, German geologist (d. 1853)
  - Anne Jean Marie René Savary, French general (d. 1833)
- April 28
  - Francis Baily, British astronomer (d. 1844)
  - Henrietta Bentinck, Duchess of Portland, British noble (d. 1844)
  - James Deacon Hume, British economist (d. 1842)
  - Owen Biddle Jr., American architect (d. 1806)
  - Manuel Piar, Venezuelan general (d. 1817)
- April 29
  - Louis Pierre Aimé Chastel, French officer (d. 1826)
  - Anna Gottlieb, Austrian singer (d. 1856)
  - David Hoadley, American architect (d. 1839)
  - Richard Sass, British artist (d. 1849)
- April 30 – John Yelloly, English doctor (d. 1842)

=== May ===
- May 1
  - John Reeves, English naturalist (d. 1856)
  - Robert Watt, Scottish physician and bibliographer (d. 1819)
- May 2
  - George Lewis, Royal Marines officer (d. 1854)
  - Ichijō Tadayoshi, Japanese kugyō (court noble) of the Edo period (d. 1837)
- May 4
  - Samuel W. Bridgham, Rhode Island politician (d. 1840)
  - Rufus Easton, American politician (d. 1834)
- May 5
  - Robert Barrie, British naval officer (d. 1841)
  - Nicolas Hyacinthe Gautier, French officer (d. 1809)
- May 6
  - Pierce Butler, British politician (d. 1846)
  - John Elias, Welsh writer and preacher (d. 1841)
  - Christoph von Lieven, Russian general and prince (d. 1839)
- May 7
  - William Bainbridge, United States Navy officer (d. 1833)
  - Jonathan Makepeace, U.S. politician (d. 1850)
- May 11 – James Townley, English Wesleyan minister and author (d. 1833)
- May 12
  - Ellis Cunliffe Lister, British politician (d. 1853)
  - Samuel Owen, British-Swedish engineer (d. 1854)
  - Friederike von Reden, German noblewoman, philanthropist and salon-holder (d. 1854)
- May 14
  - Joseph Bouchette, Canadian surveyor (d. 1841)
  - Thomas Pakenham, 2nd Earl of Longford, Anglo-Irish peer (d. 1835)
- May 15 – Johann Nepomuk von Fuchs, German chemist and mineralogist (d. 1856)
- May 16 – Johann Baptist von Keller, Roman Catholic bishop (d. 1845)
- May 18 – Gaetano Rossi, Italian librettist (d. 1855)
- May 21
  - Claude Antoine Compère, French general (d. 1812)
  - Jean-Henry-Louis Greffulhe, French private banker and politician (d. 1820)
- May 22
  - James Bennett, British minister (d. 1862)
  - Levi Cutter, American businessman politician (d. 1856)
- May 24
  - Sir Charles Burrell, 3rd Baronet, English Conservative politician (d. 1862)
  - Stuart Corbett, Archdeacon of York (d. 1845)
  - Francis Magan, United Irishman, barrister and informer (d. 1843)
- May 25
  - Isaach Isaachsen, Norwegian politician (d. 1828)
  - John Pye-Smith, English theologian (d. 1851)
- May 26 – Jean-Nicolas Curély, French cavalry officer (d. 1827)
- May 27 – Francis Beaufort, Irish hydrographer and naval officer (d. 1857)
- May 28 – Edward Charles Howard, British chemist (d. 1816)

=== June ===
- June 1
  - Pryse Pryse, British Whig politician (d. 1849)
  - Ferdinand Weerth, German theologian (d. 1836)
- June 2 – William Lawson, English-born Australian explorer and politician (d. 1850)
- June 3
  - John Roblin, Canadian politician (d. 1813)
  - Robert Tannahill, Scottish poet (d. 1810)
- June 5
  - Louis Victorin Cassagne, French officer (d. 1841)
  - Charles Bulkeley Egerton, British Army general (d. 1857)
- June 6
  - Sir John D'Oyly, 1st Baronet, of Kandy, British colonial administrator (d. 1824)
  - János Nepomuk Farkas, Hungarian politician (d. 1847)
  - Étienne Soulange-Bodin, French agronomist (d. 1846)
- June 8 – Henry Philip Hope, Anglo-Dutch art and gem collector (d. 1839)
- June 9
  - Pierre-Athanase Chauvin, French painter (d. 1832)
  - Joseph von Hammer-Purgstall, Austrian orientalist (d. 1856)
  - Edward King, Royal Navy officer (d. 1807)
  - Nathaniel Upham, American politician (d. 1829)
  - Christopher Wordsworth, English divine and scholar (d. 1846)
- June 10
  - George Dollond, British astronomer (d. 1852)
  - Carl Haller von Hallerstein, German architect (d. 1817)
- June 11
  - Christian Conrad Danneskiold-Samsøe, Danish aristocrat, magistrate and businessman (d. 1823)
  - George Suttor, farmer and pioneer settler in New South Wales, Australia (d. 1859)
- June 13 – Jacob Lindley, Founder of Ohio University (d. 1857)
- June 14
  - David Low Dodge, American theologian (d. 1852)
  - Johann Karl Freiesleben, German miner and geologist (d. 1846)
- June 17 – Asahel Stearns, American politician (d. 1839)
- June 18
  - Charles Elphinstone Fleeming, British politician and Royal Navy admiral (d. 1840)
  - Pavel Alexandrovich Stroganov, Russian military commander and statesman (d. 1817)
- June 19
  - Aloys von Kaunitz-Rietberg, German nobleman and a diplomat of the Austrian Empire (d. 1848)
  - Egerton Smith, British magazine publisher, editor (d. 1841)
  - Leonard Woods, American theologian (d. 1854)
- June 21
  - James Patton Preston, American politician (d. 1843)
  - Daniel D. Tompkins, American politician; sixth vice president of the United States (d. 1825)
- June 23
  - François Antoine Lallemand, French general (d. 1839)
  - Matthijs Siegenbeek, Dutch academic (d. 1854)
- June 24
  - Antonio González de Balcarce, Argentine general (d. 1819)
  - John Cole, American music publisher (d. 1855)
  - Princess Caroline of Gloucester, British princess (d. 1775)
  - François-Nicolas-Benoît Haxo, French general (d. 1838)
  - Claude Charles Marie du Campe de Rosamel, French naval minister (d. 1848)
  - Azariah Shadrach, Welsh minister (d. 1844)
  - Edward Taylor, British politician (d. 1843)
- June 25
  - James Gage, Canadian businessman (d. 1854)
  - Marcus Wallenberg, Swedish bishop, 1774–1833 (d. 1833)
- June 29 – Princess Amalie of Hesse-Homburg, Consort of Frederick, Hereditary Prince of Anhalt-Dessau (d. 1846)

=== July ===
- July 5
  - George Butler, English schoolmaster and divine (d. 1853)
  - Charles Herbert, British politician (d. 1808)
- July 7 – Louis Auguste Marchand Plauzonne, French general (d. 1812)
- July 9 – Marcia Arbuthnot, lady-in-waiting (d. 1806)
- July 10 – Isaac Bullard, American politician (d. 1808)
- July 11
  - Robert Jameson, British scientist; (d. 1854)
  - Somerset Lowry-Corry, 2nd Earl Belmore, Irish nobleman and politician (d. 1841)
  - Axel Otto Mörner, Swedish count, general, politician and artist (d. 1852)
- July 12
  - Jonathan Friedrich Bahnmaier, German theologian (d. 1841)
  - Jean-Francois Coindet, Genevan physiologist (d. 1834)
  - James Stuart, British politician (d. 1833)
- July 14
  - Hans Graf von Bülow, German noble (d. 1825)
  - Ferdinand Hartmann, German painter (d. 1842)
  - Francis Lathom, British writer (d. 1832)
- July 15 – David Jacob van Lennep, Dutch university professor, poet and writer (d. 1853)
- July 17 – John Wilbur, American Quaker minister (d. 1856)
- July 20
  - Edward Pelham Brenton, British Royal Navy officer & historian (d. 1839)
  - Auguste de Marmont, French General, nobleman and Marshal of France (d. 1852)
- July 24 – Franz von Klebelsberg zu Thumburg, Czech nobleman (d. 1857)
- July 26 – Ernst Ludwig von Tippelskirch, Prussian army officer (d. 1840)
- July 28
  - Elias Walker Durnford, British Army general (d. 1850)
  - John West, British Royal Navy officer (d. 1862)
- July 29 – Edward Wakefield, English statistician (d. 1854)
- July 30 – Charles de Graimberg, French art collector and painter (d. 1864)
- July 31
  - Jonathan Richmond, American politician (d. 1853)
  - Diodata Saluzzo Roero, Italian writer and poet (d. 1840)

=== August ===
- August 1
  - John Adam, silversmith (d. 1848)
  - Jérôme Demers, Québécois priest and teacher of philosophy (d. 1853)
  - Friedrich Guimpel, German illustrator, engraver and botanical artist (d. 1839)
- August 2 – Ole Clausen Mørch, Norwegian politician (d. 1829)
- August 5
  - Karl Wilhelm Bardou, German portraitist (d. 1842)
  - John C. Devereux, American politician (d. 1848)
- August 6 – Asa Wells, pioneer farmer and surveyor from Pompey (d. 1859)
- August 7
  - François Benjamin Levrault, French politician (d. 1855)
  - William Morgan, resident of Batavia, New York (d. 1826)
- August 9
  - George Frederick Beltz, British genealogist (d. 1841)
  - Solomon Van Rensselaer, American politician and soldier (d. 1852)
- August 11
  - Eugène François d'Arnauld, French public official (d. 1854)
  - Joseph Franque, French painter (d. 1833)
  - Manuel de Sarratea, Argentine politician (d. 1849)
  - François Tassé, Canadian politician (d. 1832)
- August 12
  - Jean François Boissonade de Fontarabie, historian from France (d. 1857)
  - Hannah Kilham, Methodist missionary (d. 1832)
  - Stephen Peter Rigaud, English mathematical historian and astronomer (d. 1839)
  - Robert Southey, English romantic poet (d. 1843)
- August 13
  - Hipólito da Costa, Brazilian journalist and diplomat (d. 1823)
  - John Wilson, Scottish landscape and marine painter (d. 1855)
- August 15 – François-Joseph-Marie Fayolle, French musicologist, man of letters and mathematician (d. 1852)
- August 17
  - George E. Blake, American music publisher (d. 1871)
  - Stephan von Breuning, German librettist and author (d. 1827)
- August 18
  - Gaspard Laurent Bayle, French physician (d. 1816)
  - Meriwether Lewis, American explorer, soldier and public administrator (d. 1809)
- August 19 – Denis-Benjamin Viger, Lower Canadian politician (d. 1861)
- August 20
  - Ludvig Frederik Brock, Norwegian military officer (d. 1853)
  - Bernardo Gutiérrez de Lara, Governor of Tamaulipas (d. 1841)
- August 22
  - François Aregnaudeau, French privateer captain (d. 1812)
  - Bartholomäus Herder, German publisher (d. 1839)
- August 23
  - Pierre David de Colbert-Chabanais, French general (d. 1853)
  - Jacob Crocheron, American politician (d. 1849)
  - Mary Moody Emerson, American writer (d. 1863)
  - William Plunkett Maclay, American politician (d. 1842)
- August 24 – Anton Ludwig Ernst Horn, German physician (d. 1848)
- August 25 – Samuel William Manthey, Norwegian politician (d. 1815)
- August 26 – Sir John Lubbock, 2nd Baronet, English banker, politician (d. 1840)
- August 28 – Elizabeth Ann Seton, co-founder of Mount St. Mary's University in the United States, founder of the Sisters of Charity (d. 1821)
- August 30 – Henri Van Assche, painter (d. 1841)
- August 31 – Charles Turner, English engraver (d. 1857)

=== September ===
- September 1
  - George Platt, Canadian politician (d. 1816)
  - Jane Stewart, Countess of Galloway, British noble (d. 1842)
- September 5
  - Enos Collins, Canadian businessman (d. 1871)
  - Caspar David Friedrich, German painter (d. 1840)
- September 7
  - Johann Jakob Bernhardi, German physician and botanist (d. 1850)
  - Colin Halkett, British Army general (d. 1856)
  - Vedanayagam Sastriar Tamil Lutheran hymnwriter and court poet (d. 1864)
- September 8
  - Richard Ashley, English viola player (d. 1836)
  - Anne Catherine Emmerich, German Augustinian Canoness, mystic, Marian visionary, ecstatic and stigmatist (d. 1824)
- September 9 – Salomon Mayer von Rothschild, Austrian banker and businessman (d. 1855)
- September 14
  - Lord William Bentinck, First Governor General of India, British soldier and statesman (d. 1839)
  - Georges Boisot, Minister of Interior of the Helvetic Republic (d. 1853)
  - Henry Ridgely Warfield, American politician (d. 1839)
- September 15
  - Robert Hastings Hunkins, American politician (d. 1853)
  - María Nicolasa de Iturbide, princess of Iturbide (d. 1840)
- September 17
  - William Fitzwilliam Owen, British Royal Navy admiral (d. 1857)
  - Patrick Syme, Scottish painter (d. 1845)
- September 19
  - Giuseppe Caspar Mezzofanti, Italian cardinal and hyperpolyglot (d. 1849)
  - Coulson Wallop, English politician (d. 1807)
- September 21 – John Peter Grant, Scottish politician (d. 1848)
- September 24
  - Robert Gilmor Jr., shipowner and art collector (d. 1848)
  - Michael Linning, Scottish solicitor (d. 1838)
  - Mariano Sánchez de Loria, Argentine politician (d. 1842)
- September 25
  - Judith Lomax, American poet and religious writer (d. 1828)
  - Nikolaus von Maillot de la Treille, German general (d. 1834)
- September 26 – Johnny Appleseed, (John Chapman), American nurseryman and Swedenborgian missionary (d. 1845)
- September 27
  - John Griscom, American chemist (d. 1852)
  - Bredo Henrik von Munthe af Morgenstierne Sr., Norwegian jurist (d. 1835)
- September 28
  - Sir James Colquhoun, 3rd Baronet, of Luss, politician (d. 1836)
  - Sebastian von Schrenck, German politician (d. 1848)
- September 30
  - Charles-Étienne Chaussegros de Léry, Canadian politician (d. 1842)
  - George Mathews, American judge (d. 1836)

=== October ===
- October 2 – Johannes Spitler, American painter of furniture (d. 1837)
- October 4
  - Francis Ommanney, British MP (d. 1840)
  - Henry Siddons, British actor (d. 1815)
- October 7
  - Ferdinando Orlandi, Italian composer (d. 1848)
  - Jean Thienpont, Belgian politician and lawyer (d. 1863)
- October 8
  - Henry Duncan, British geologist, priest and social reformer (d. 1846)
  - John Ely, American politician (d. 1849)
  - Teis Lundegaard, Norwegian politician (d. 1856)
- October 10 – Peter Nourse, American clergyman (d. 1840)
- October 12
  - George J. F. Clarke, prominent citizen of East Florida (d. 1836)
  - Karoline von Feuchtersleben, German noblewoman (d. 1842)
  - Luis Eduardo Pérez, President of Uruguay (d. 1841)
- October 13
  - William Astell, English banker and politician (d. 1847)
  - Samuel McKee, American politician and lawyer (d. 1826)
- October 15 – John Boit, one of the first Americans involved in the maritime fur trade (d. 1829)
- October 18
  - Adolf Müllner, German writer (d. 1829)
  - Sarah Thompson, Countess Rumford, philanthropist (d. 1852)
- October 19 – Charles Cornwallis, 2nd Marquess Cornwallis, British noble (d. 1823)
- October 21 – Archibald Campbell, British Army officer (d. 1838)
- October 23
  - Adam Otto von Bistram, Baltic German military personnel in Imperial Russian service (d. 1828)
  - René de Chazet, French writer (d. 1844)
- October 26 – Albert Gregorius, Belgian painter (d. 1853)
- October 27 – Alexander Baring, 1st Baron Ashburton, British politician (d. 1848)
- October 28
  - John Boyle, United States federal judge and member of the U.S. House of Representatives (d. 1835)
  - Konstanty Adam Czartoryski, Polish noble and art collector (d. 1860)
- October 29 – Augustin Joseph Caron, French military officer (d. 1822)
- October 30
  - Pierre Barrois, French soldier and officer (d. 1860)
  - Clarkson Crolius, American politician (d. 1843)

=== November ===
- November 1
  - Alexander Caldwell, American judge (d. 1839)
  - René Perin, French playwright (d. 1858)
- November 2 – Georges-Simon Serullas, French pharmacist (d. 1832)
- November 3 – Jakov Jakšić, Serbian postmaster (d. 1848)
- November 4
  - Robert Allan, poet (d. 1841)
  - Johannes P. Bøe, Norwegian politician (d. 1859)
  - Carlos María de Bustamante, Mexican politician (d. 1848)
  - John Warrock, American publisher (d. 1858)
  - Ignaz Heinrich von Wessenberg, German historian (d. 1860)
- November 5
  - William Berry, English genealogist (d. 1851)
  - Johann Christian August Clarus, German surgeon (d. 1854)
- November 6
  - David Bevan, banker (d. 1846)
  - Joseph Récamier, French gynaecologist (d. 1852)
- November 7
  - Richard Noel-Hill, 4th Baron Berwick, British peer (d. 1848)
  - Ebenezer F. Norton, American politician (d. 1851)
- November 8
  - Lord Frederick Montagu, British politician (d. 1827)
  - Robert Reid, British architect (d. 1856)
- November 9
  - Thomas Fortescue Kennedy, Royal Navy officer during the French Revolutionary Wars and Napoleonic Wars (d. 1846)
  - Louis Hayes Petit, English barrister and politician (d. 1849)
- November 10 – John Miller, New York politician (d. 1862)
- November 11 – Marcin Dunin, Roman Catholic archbishop of Gnesen and Posen (d. 1842)
- November 12
  - Charles Bell, British surgeon and artist (d. 1842)
  - Joachim Zachris Duncker, Swedish soldier (d. 1809)
- November 14 – Gaspare Spontini, Italian composer and conductor (d. 1851)
- November 17 – Pierre-Alexandre Le Camus, French politician (d. 1824)
- November 18
  - William Horsley, English musician (d. 1858)
  - Wilhelmine of Prussia, Queen of the Netherlands, Dutch queen consort (from 1815 to 1837); second daughter and fourth child of Frederick William II of Prussia and Frederica Louisa of Hesse-Darmstadt (d. 1837)
- November 19 – Vasile Moga, Romanian orthodox bishop of Sibiu (d. 1845)
- November 20
  - Archibald Cregeen, Manx lexicographer (d. 1841)
  - Henrik Steenbuch, Norwegian lawyer (d. 1839)
- November 21
  - Domingo French, Argentine revolutionary (d. 1825)
  - Elisabeth Canori Mora, Italian Roman Catholic mystic (d. 1825)
- November 24 – Thomas Dick, British astronomer (d. 1857)
- November 25 – Francisco de Paula Marín, A Spaniard influential in the early Kingdom of Hawaii; confidant of Hawaiian King Kamehameha I (d. 1837)
- November 26
  - Georg Ludwig Cancrin, Russian German economist and politician (d. 1845)
  - William Hunter, American politician and diplomat (d. 1849)
  - Peter Frederik Wulff, Danish naval officer (d. 1842)
- November 27 – John Howard Kyan, British inventor (d. 1850)
- November 28
  - Frederick IV, Duke of Saxe-Gotha-Altenburg (d. 1825)
  - Sir Richard King, 2nd Baronet, Royal Navy admiral (d. 1834)
  - Princess Maria Antonia of Parma, Italian princess (d. 1841)
- November 29
  - Carl Johan Fahlcrantz, painter (d. 1861)
  - Johann Gottfried Gruber, German literary critic (d. 1851)

=== December ===
- December 1 – Alexander Leith, British Army officer (d. 1859)
- December 2
  - François-André Baudin, French naval officer (d. 1842)
  - François-René Boussen, Belgian priest (d. 1848)
- December 3 – Giuseppe Federico Palombini, military general (d. 1850)
- December 4 – John Weyland, British writer and politician; (d. 1854)
- December 5 – Johann Wilhelm Andreas Pfaff, German mathematician (d. 1835)
- December 10 – Nicolas Morice, French navy officer (d. 1848)
- December 11 – David Bowen, Felinfoel, Welsh Baptist minister from Felinfoel (d. 1853)
- December 12 – William Henry, English chemist (d. 1836)
- December 13
  - Eline Heger, Danish actress (d. 1842)
  - Nathan F. Dixon I, American politician (d. 1842)
- December 15 – Michel Ange Lancret, Engineer with the French Corps of Bridges and Roads (d. 1807)
- December 16 – Caroline Campbell, Duchess of Argyll, British noble (d. 1835)
- December 17
  - Andrew Jukes, British surgeon (d. 1821)
  - Littleton Waller Tazewell, American politician (d. 1860)
- December 20
  - John Pasco, English admiral (d. 1853)
  - Charles Richard Vaughan, British diplomat (d. 1849)
- December 21
  - John Thomas Barber Beaumont, British artist (d. 1841)
  - James Ingram, English academic (d. 1850)
- December 23 – Ludwig von Vincke, politician, writer and jurist (d. 1844)
- December 26 – Ferdinand Oechsle, German inventor (d. 1852)
- December 27
  - Brenton Halliburton, Canadian judge (d. 1860)
  - Ephraim Hart, American politician (d. 1839)
  - Johann Philipp Neumann, Austrian physicist, librarian and poet (d. 1849)
- December 28
  - Mary Birkett Card, poet, abolitionist and feminist (d. 1817)
  - Thomas Moore Musgrave, English postmaster and translator (d. 1854)
- December 29 – Maurice FitzGerald, 18th Knight of Kerry, British politician (d. 1849)
- December 31 – James Bunbury White, American politician (d. 1819)
- Unknown date – Sergey Glinka, Russian author, brother of Fyodor Glinka (d. 1847)

== Deaths ==
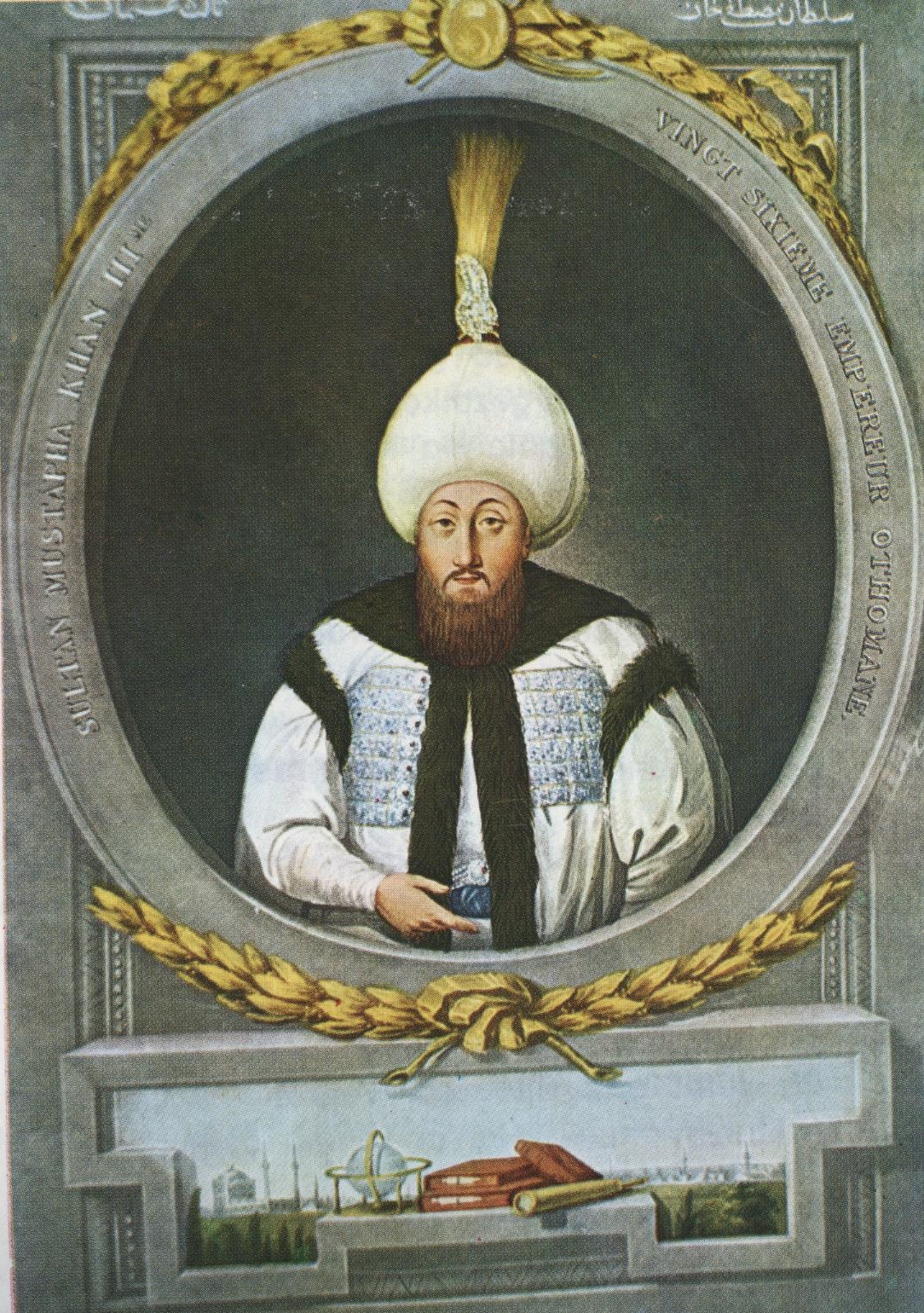
Mustafa III died 21 January

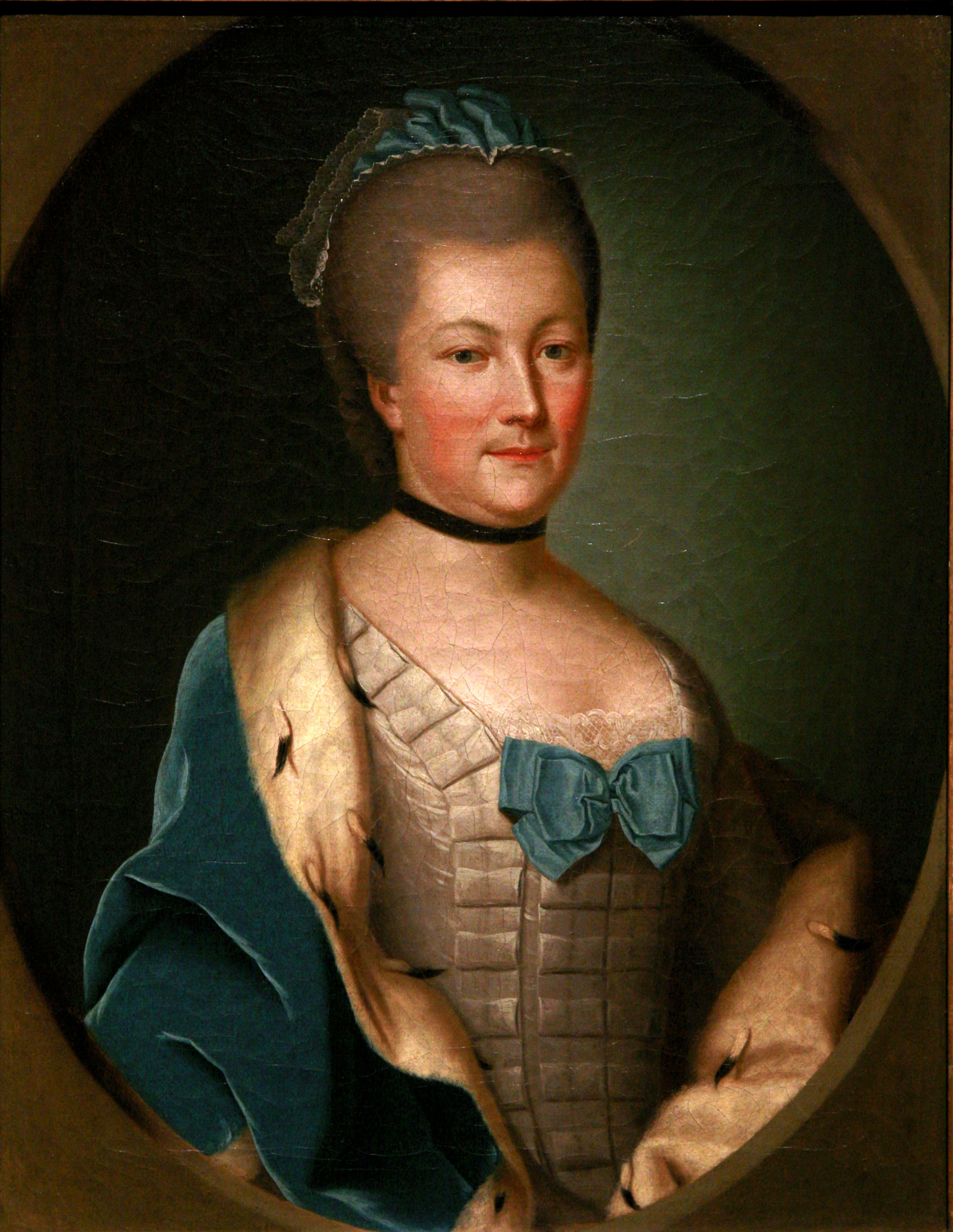
Countess Palatine Caroline of Zweibrücken died 30 March

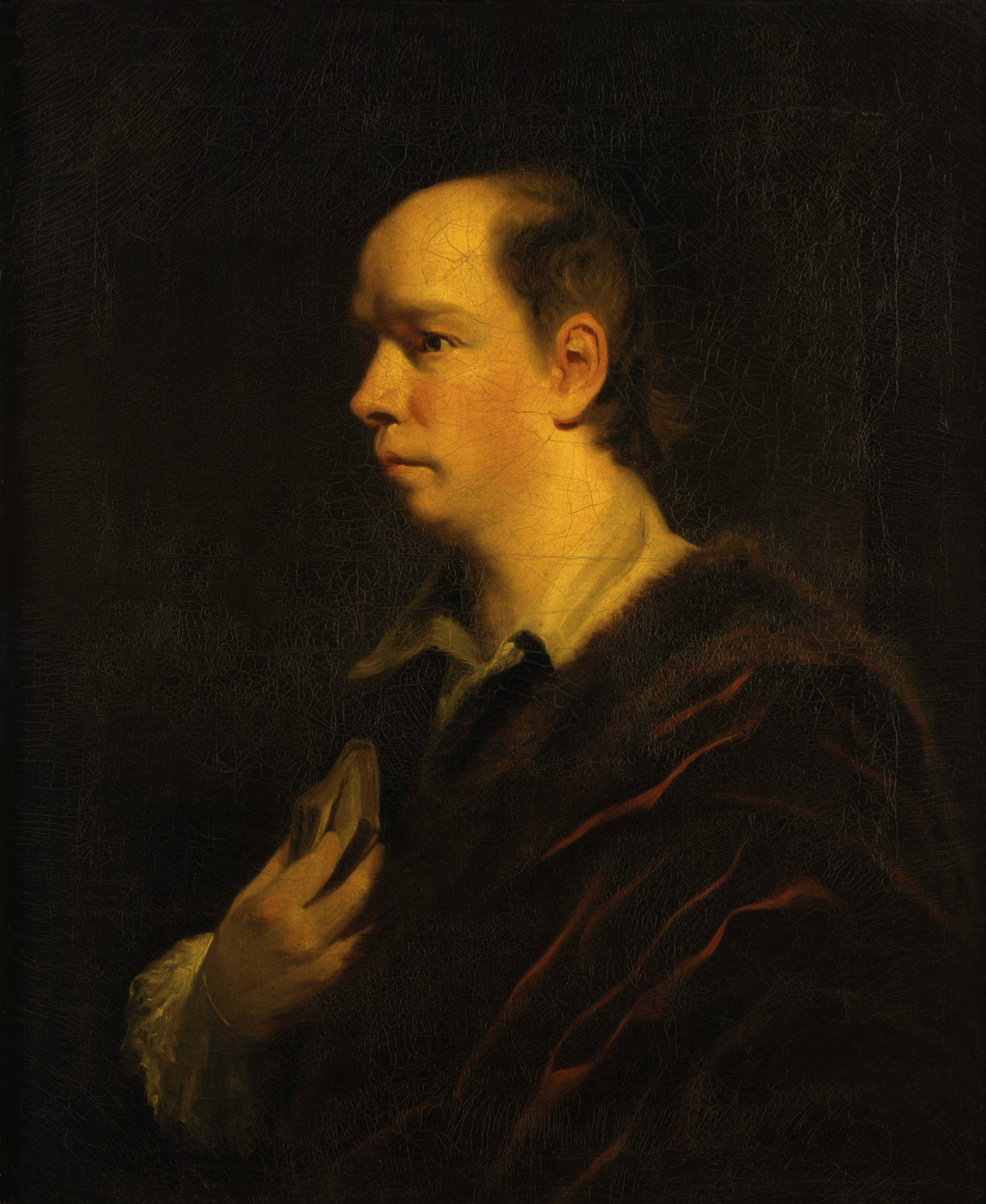
Oliver Goldsmith died 4 April

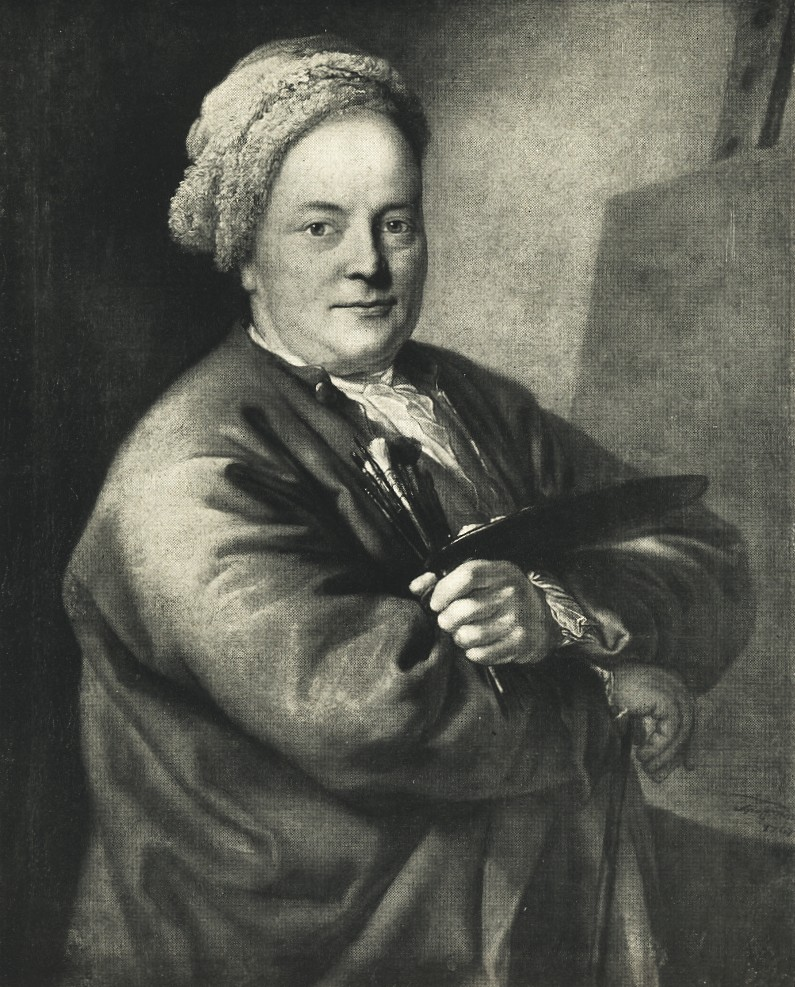
Christian Wilhelm Ernst Dietrich died 23 April

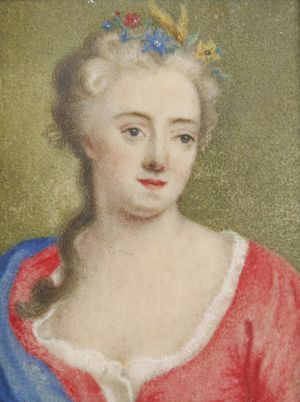
Maria Machteld van Sypesteyn died 26 April

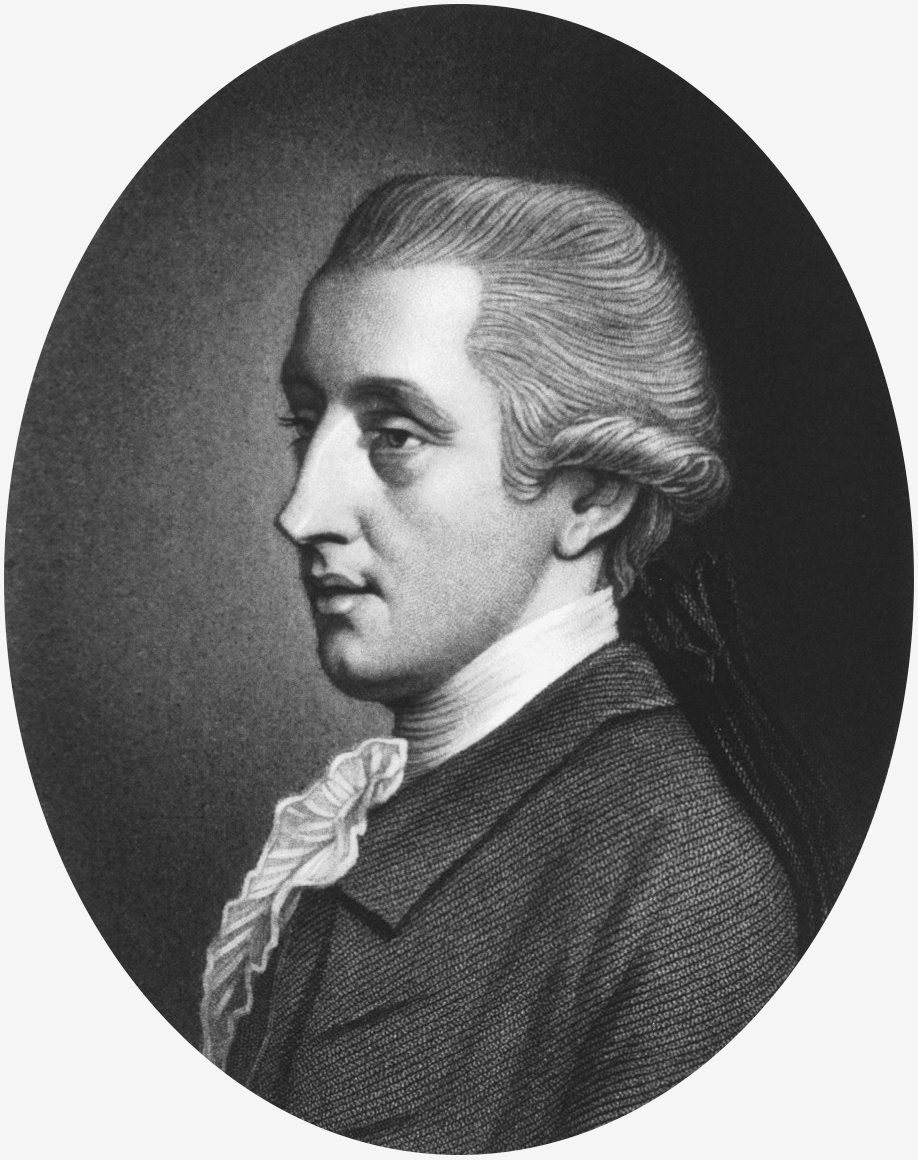
William Hewson died 1 May

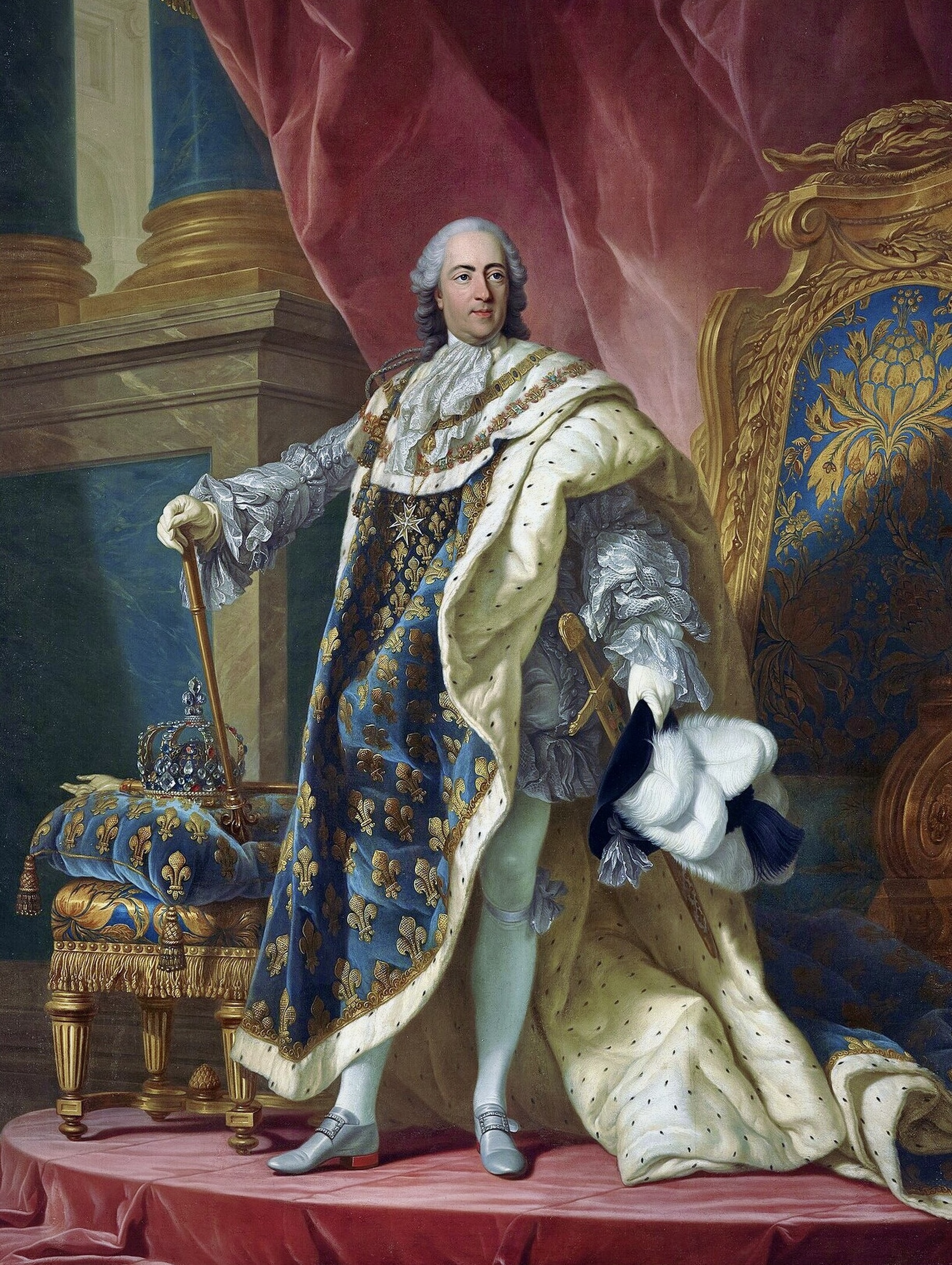
Louis XV died 10 May

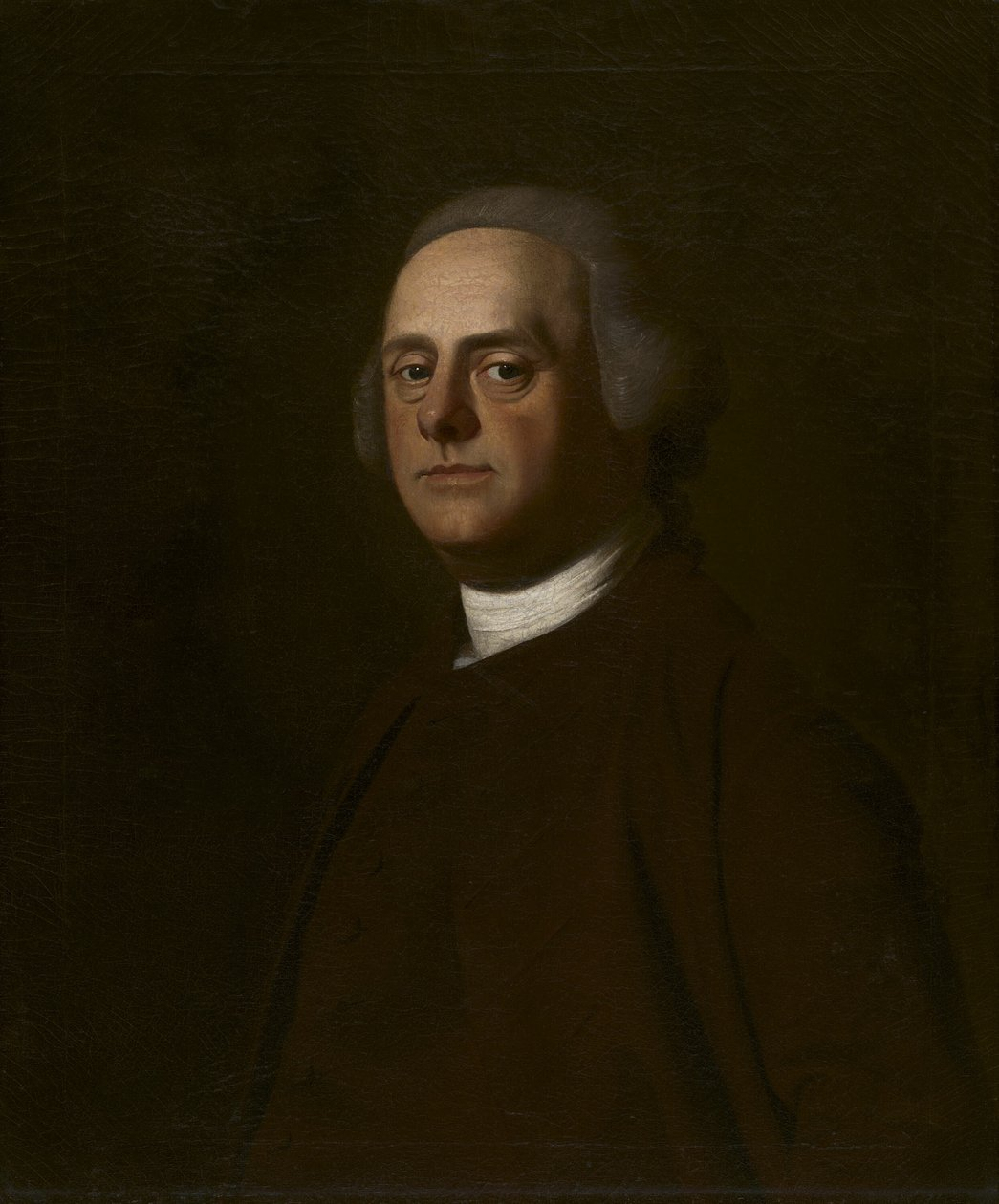
Joseph Gerrish died 3 June

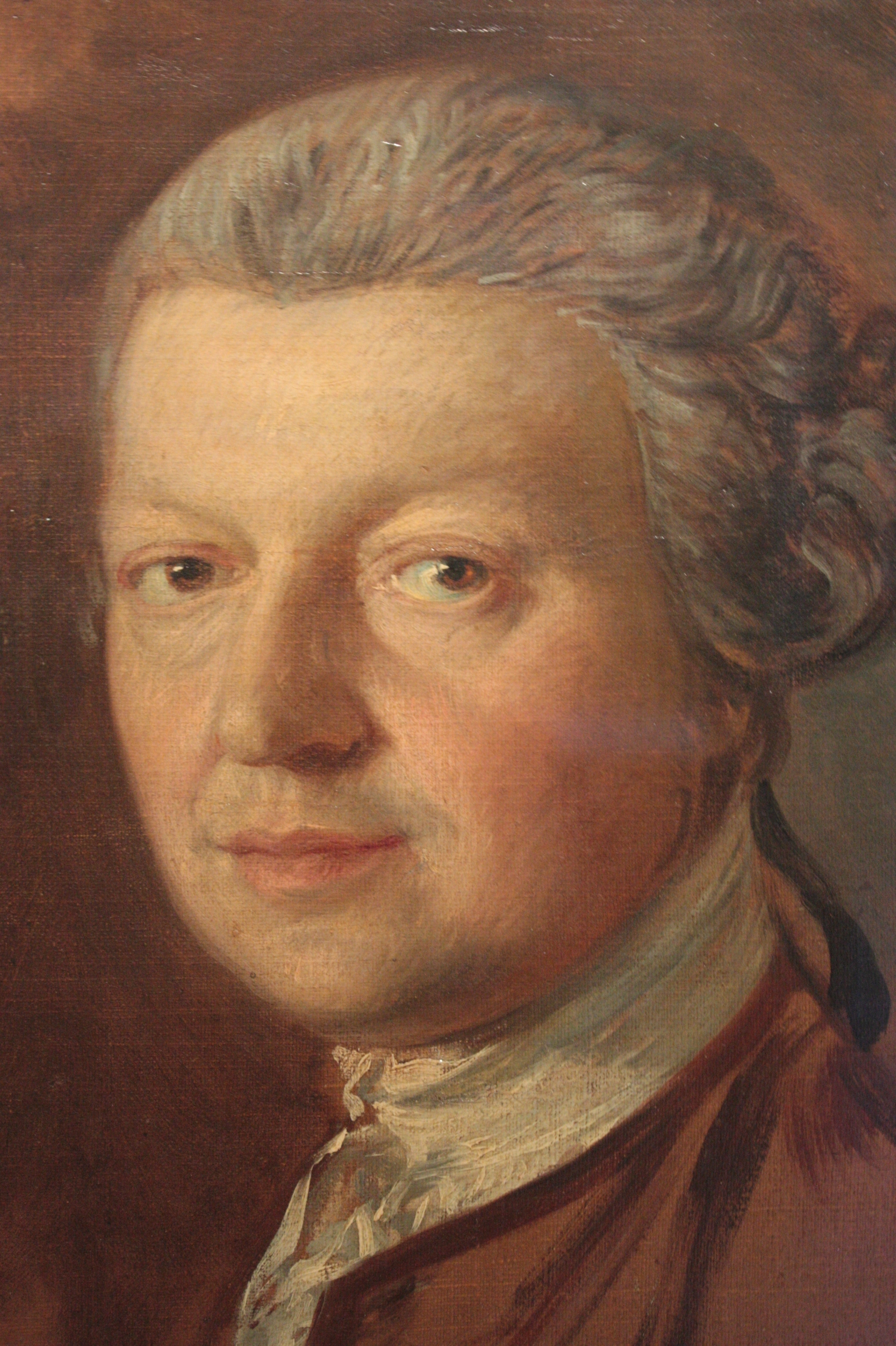
Joshua Kirby died 20 June

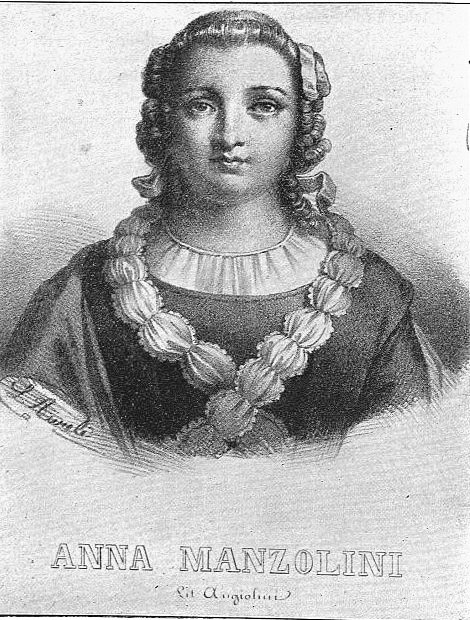
Anna Morandi Manzolini died 9 July

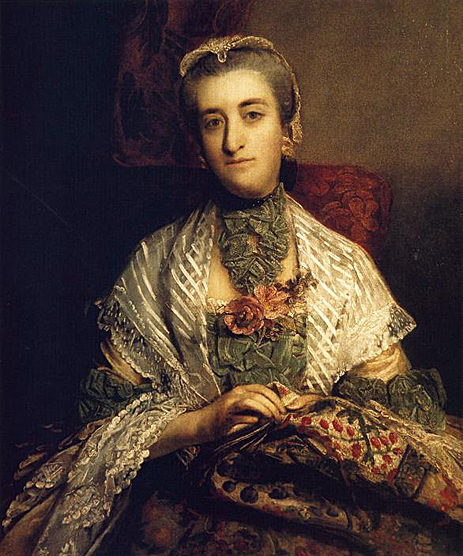
Caroline Fox, 1st Baroness Holland died 24 July

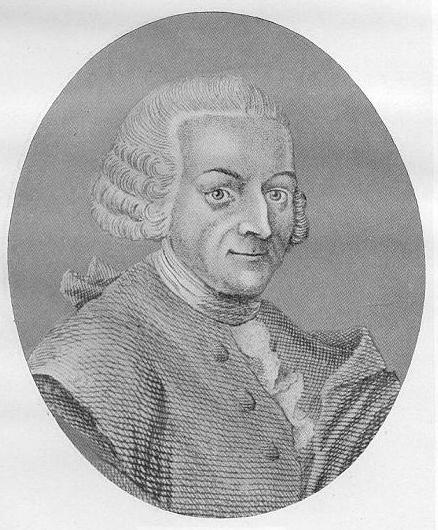
Johann Jakob Reiske died 14 August

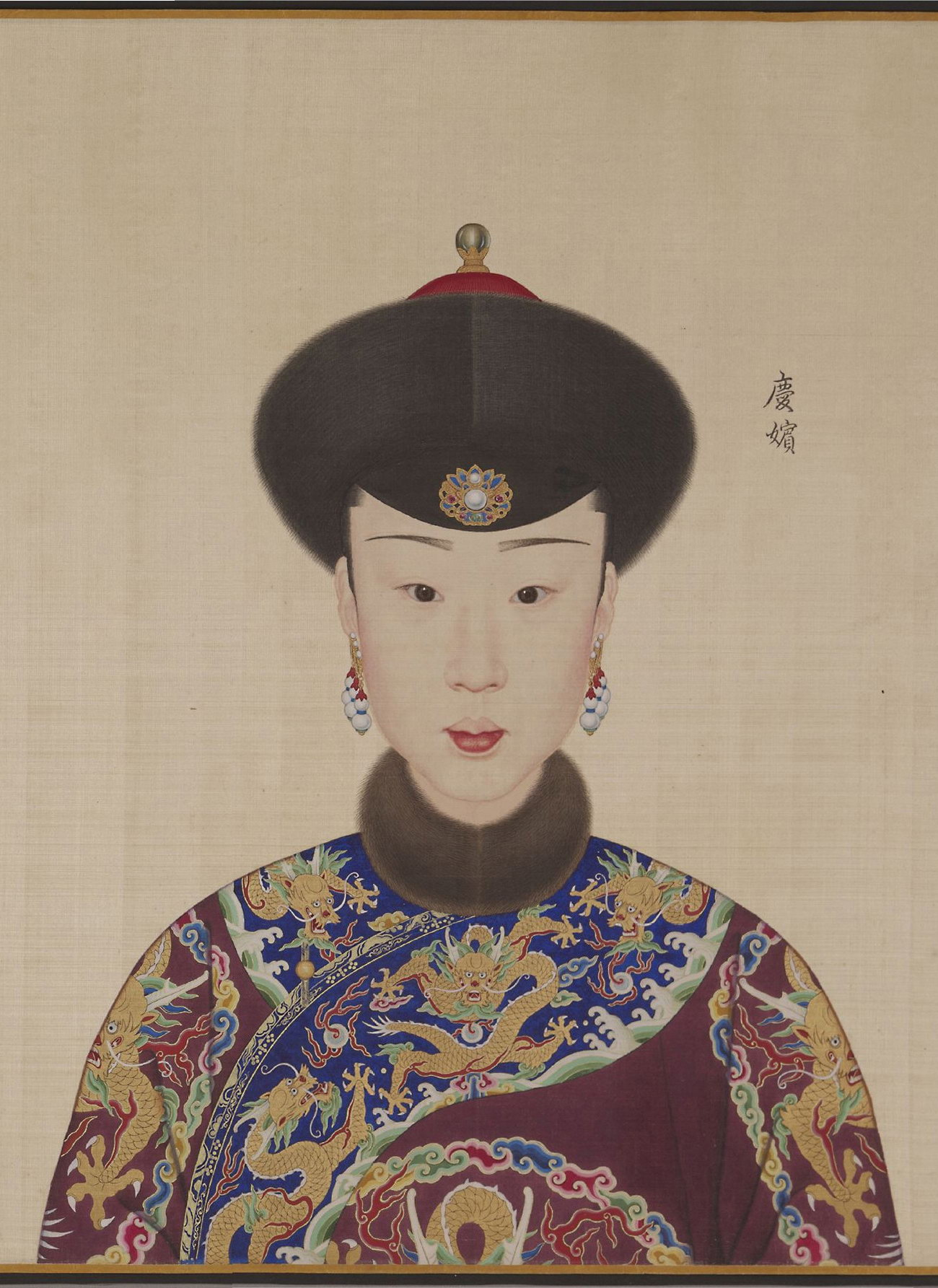
Imperial Noble Consort Qinggong died 21 August

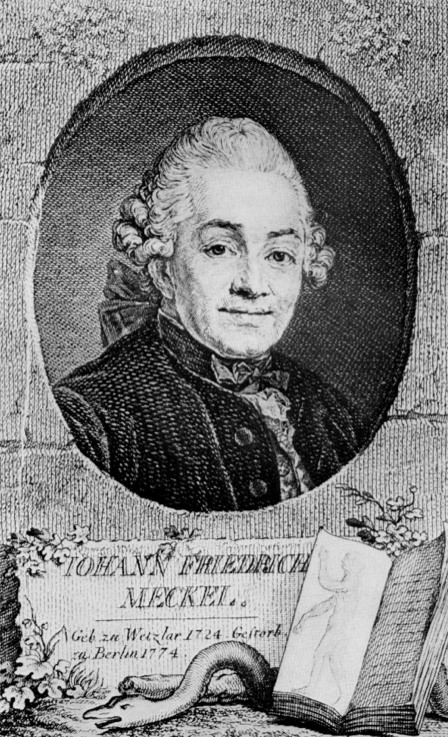
Johann Friedrich Meckel, the Elder died 18 September

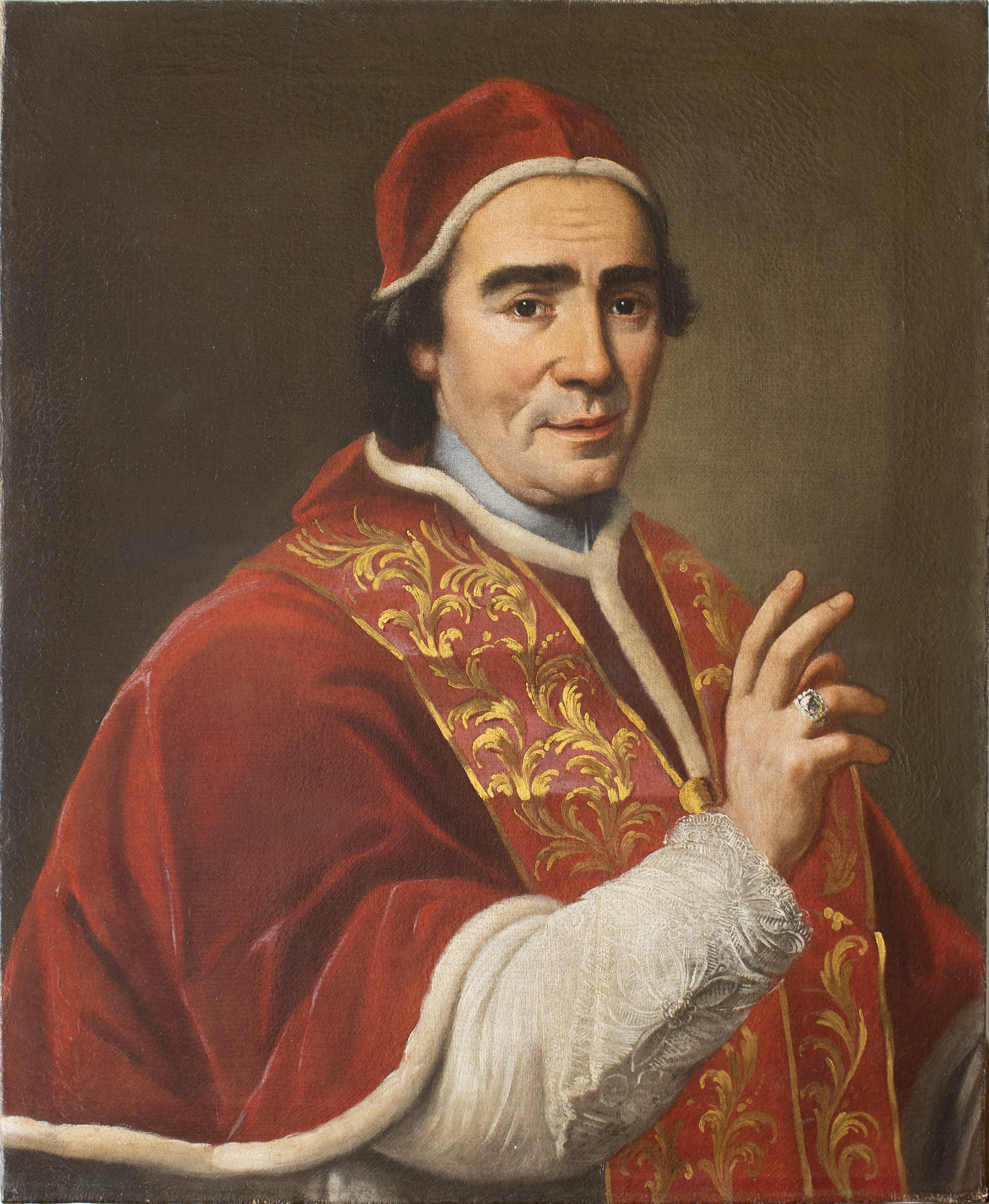
Pope Clement XIV died 22 September

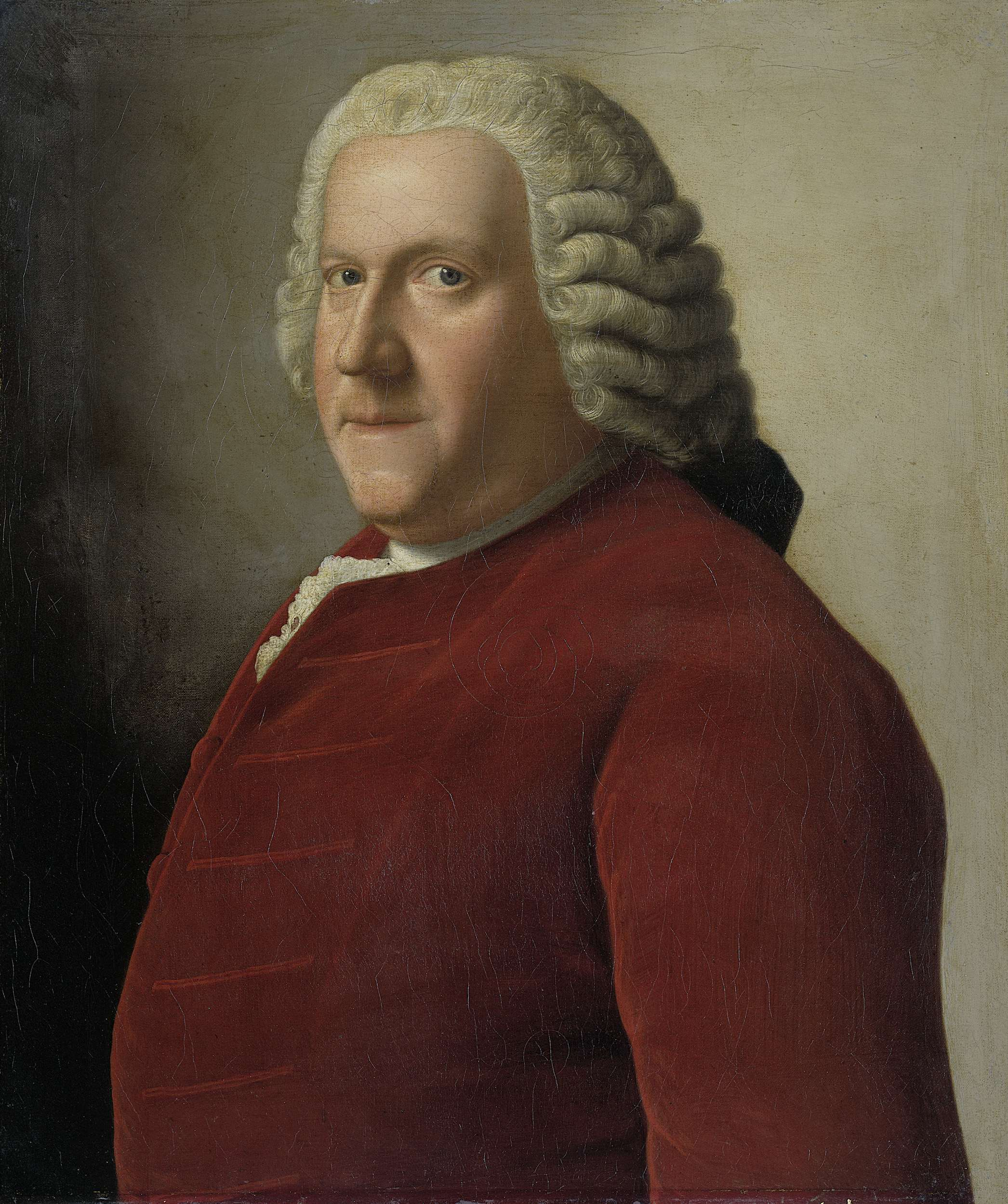
Willem Bentinck van Rhoon died 13 October

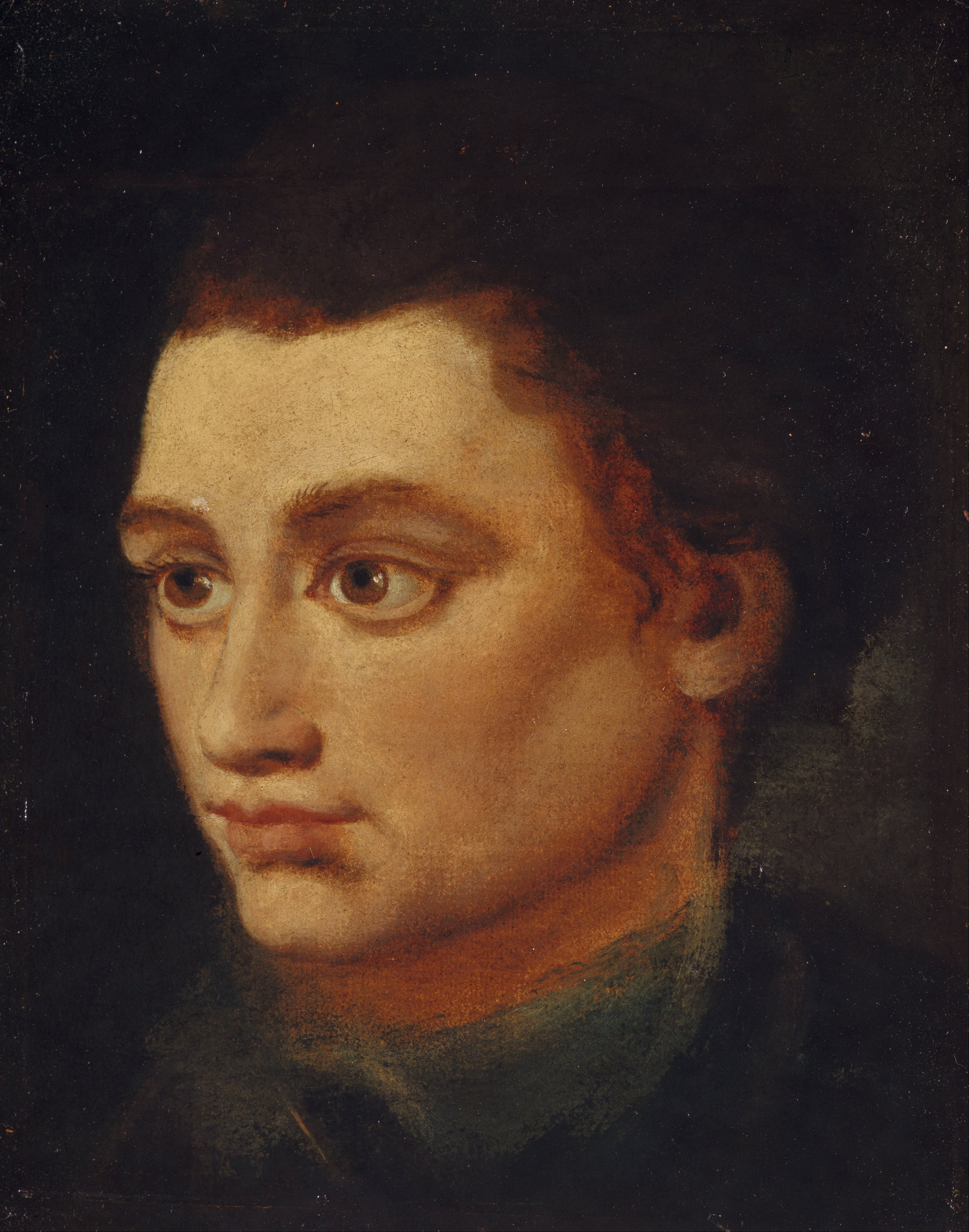
Robert Fergusson died 16 October

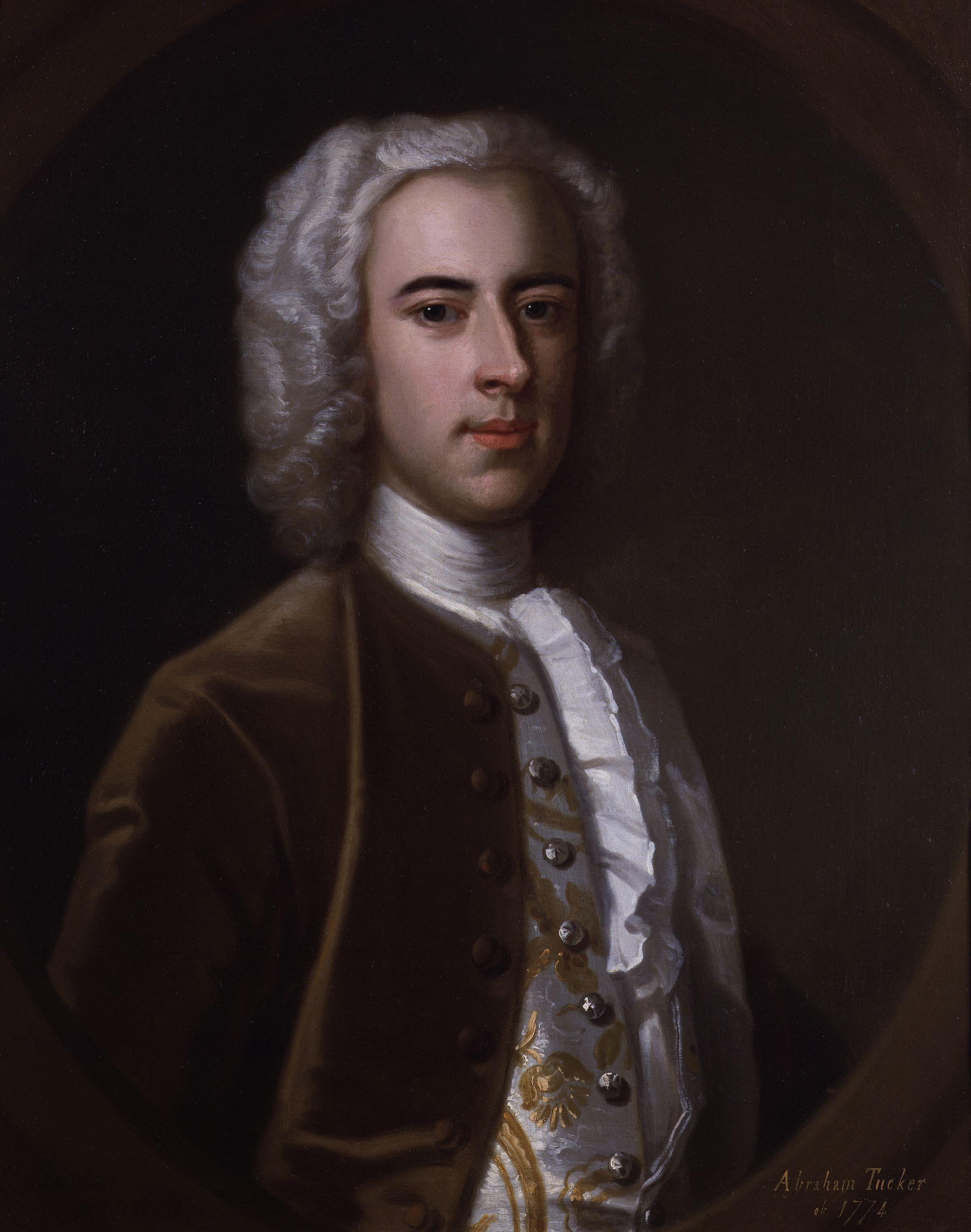
Abraham Tucker died 20 November

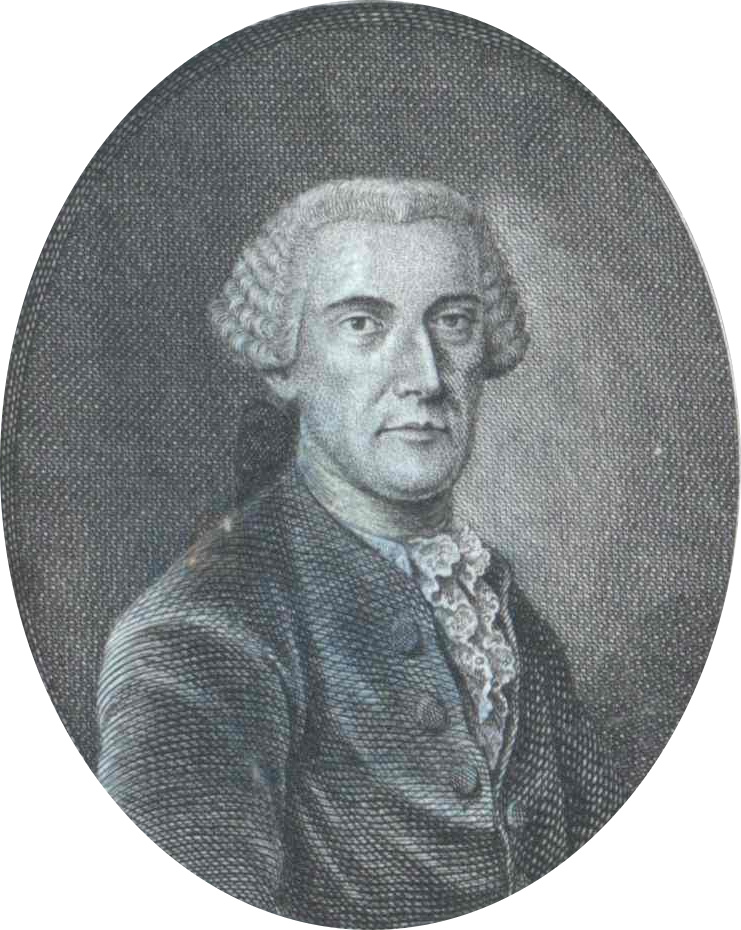
Johann Siegmund Popowitsch died 21 November

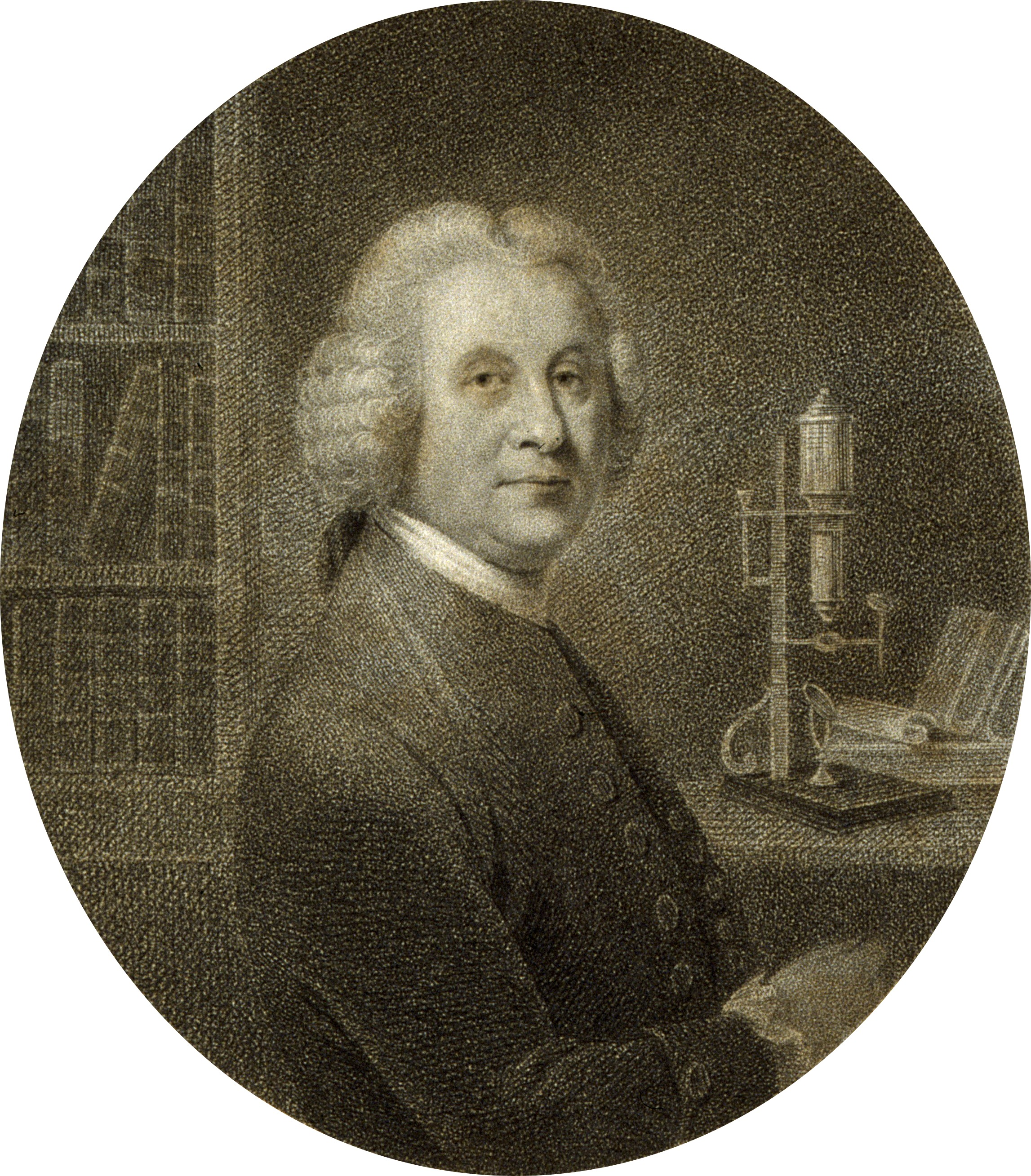
Henry Baker died 25 November

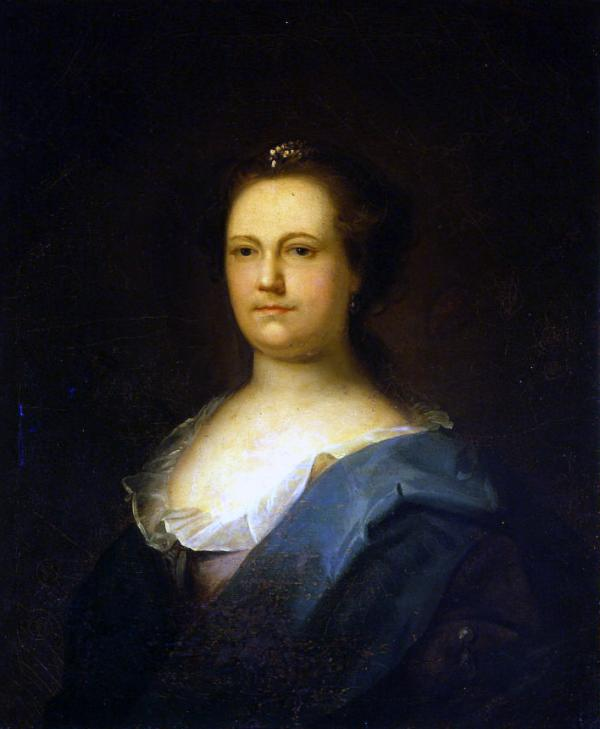
Deborah Read died 19 December

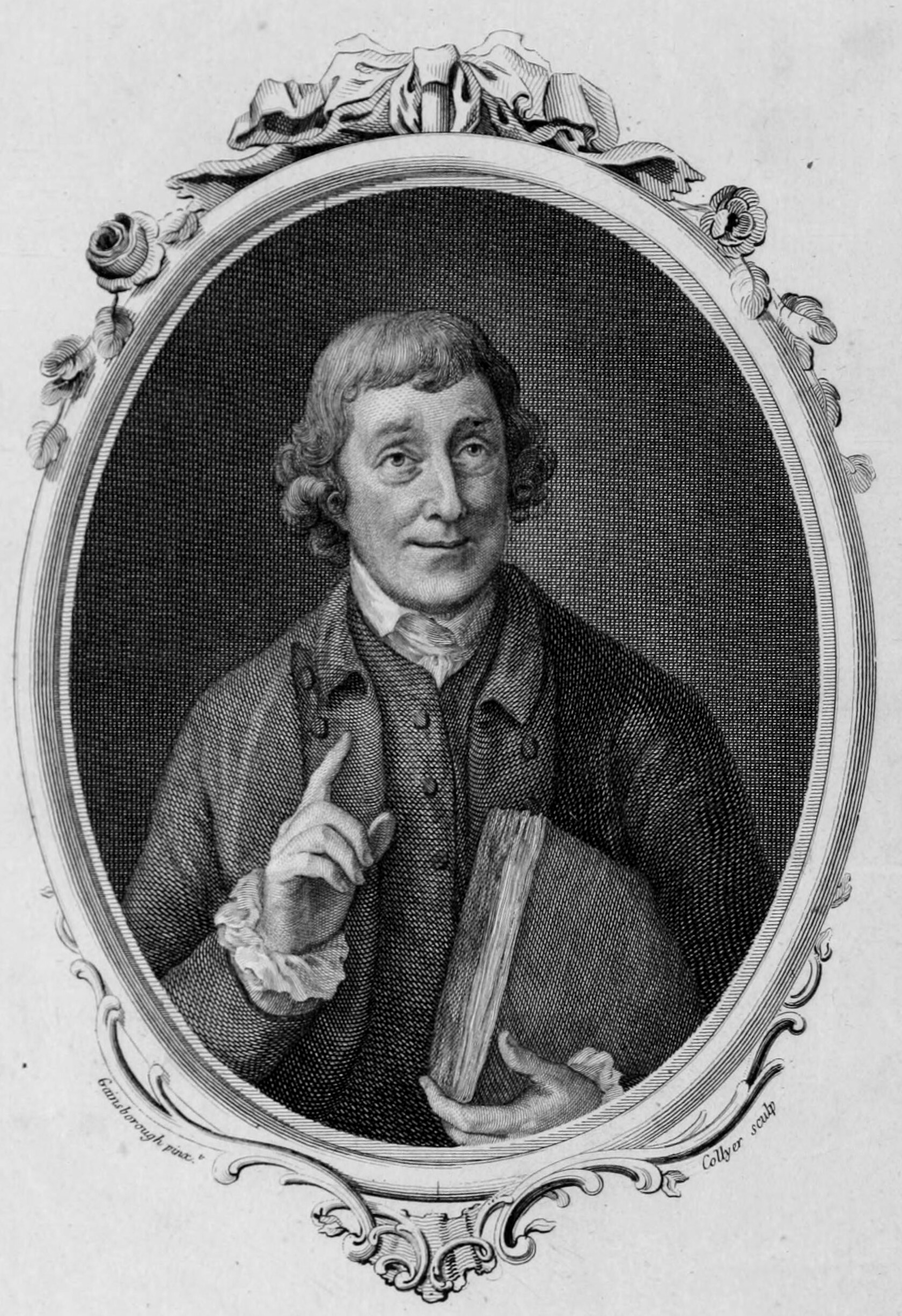
Paul Whitehead (satirist) died 20 December

=== January ===
- January 1
  - Thomas Hollis, English political philosopher and author (b. 1720)
  - Jan Jerzy Plersch, Polish sculptor (b. 1704)
- January 7
  - Antoine Clériadus de Choiseul-Beaupré, French archbishop (b. 1707)
  - Józef Andrzej Załuski, Polish bishop (b. 1702)
- January 9 – Jacques-François Blondel, French architect (b. 1705)
- January 13
  - Shem Drowne, American coppersmith (b. 1683)
  - John Pugh Pryse, British Member of Parliament (b. 1739)
- January 18 – Louis de Brienne de Conflans d'Armentières, French general (b. 1711)
- January 19 – Thomas Gillespie, Scottish church leader (b. 1708)
- January 21
  - Florian Leopold Gassmann, Austrian composer (b. 1729)
  - Mustafa III, Sultan of the Ottoman Empire from 1757 to 1774 (b. 1717)
  - James Lacy, actor and theatre manager (b. 1696)
  - Hans Jacob Scheel, Norwegian general (b. 1714)
- January 22 – Dudley Cosby, 1st Baron Sydney, Irish politician (b. 1730)
- January 29 – Franciszek Ferdynant Lubomirski, Franciszek Ferdynand Lubomirski was a Polish nobleman (b. 1710)
- January 30
  - Jean-Pierre Guignon, French composer (b. 1702)
  - František Tůma, Czech composer (b. 1704)
- January 31 – Consort Yu, Concubine of Chinese Emperor Qianlong (b. 1730)

=== February ===
- February 1 – Johann Heinrich Zopf, German historian (b. 1691)
- February 4 – Charles Marie de La Condamine, French explorer, geographer, and mathematician (b. 1701)
- February 8 – Thomas Belasyse, 1st Earl Fauconberg, British peer (b. 1699)
- February 17 – Robert Jones, English politician (b. 1704)
- February 18 – Karl Michael von Attems, Austrian Catholic archbishop and prince of the Holy Roman Empire (b. 1711)
- February 25 – Johann Georg, Chevalier de Saxe, German general (b. 1704)
- February 27 – Knud Leem, Norwegian priest and linguist (b. 1697)
- February 28 – Anthony Askew, English physician and book collector (b. 1722)

=== March ===
- March 1 – Pierre-Antoine Gourgaud, French actor (b. 1706)
- March 2 – William Talbot, English evangelical clergyman (b. 1717)
- March 3 – Andrew Oliver, American merchant and public official (b. 1706)
- March 4 – William Boys, Royal Navy officer (b. 1700)
- March 5 – Georg Joachim Mark, German theologian (b. 1726)
- March 7 – Carlo Alberto Guidoboni Cavalchini, Catholic cardinal (b. 1683)
- March 10 – William Browne, English physician (b. 1692)
- March 18 – Matthew Fetherstonhaugh, British politician (b. 1714)
- March 19 – Lucas Ramírez Galán, Roman Catholic archbishop (b. 1715)
- March 21 – Diego Bernardo de Peredo y Navarrete, Mexican Roman Catholic clergyman, bishop of Yucatán (b. 1696)
- March 25
  - Spencer Cowper, Dean of Durham Cathedral (b. 1713)
  - Countess Caroline of Nassau-Saarbrücken, German noble (b. 1704)
  - Zeynep Sultan, Ottoman princess, Daughter of Ottoman Sultan Ahmed III (b. 1720)
- March 30 – Countess Palatine Caroline of Zweibrücken, German noble (b. 1721)

=== April ===
- April 1 – Claudius Amyand, English politician (b. 1718)
- April 4 – Oliver Goldsmith, Anglo-Irish writer, poet, and physician (b. 1728)
- April 5 – Situ Panchen, Tibetan lama and painter (b. 1700)
- April 11 – Elias Gottlob Haussmann, German artist (b. 1695)
- April 15
  - Somerset Butler, 1st Earl of Carrick, Irish peer (b. 1718)
  - Jean Ignace de La Ville, French diplomat (b. 1690)
- April 17 – John Winslow, British Army general (b. 1703)
- April 18
  - Michael Ranft, German historian, writer and hofmeister (b. 1700)
  - Rodolfo Emilio Brignole Sale, politician (b. 1708)
- April 20
  - Aleksandr Bibikov, Russian statesman and military officer (b. 1729)
  - Jean Saas, French lexicographer (b. 1703)
- April 23
  - Hafiz Rahmat Khan Barech, Afghan highlander (b. 1723)
  - Christian Wilhelm Ernst Dietrich, German artist (b. 1712)
- April 24 – Sara Banzet, French educator, diarist (b. 1745)
- April 25 – John Fane, 9th Earl of Westmorland, English Earl (b. 1728)
- April 26 – Maria Machteld van Sypesteyn, Dutch painter (b. 1724)
- April 28 – Gottfried Lengnich, historian and politician (b. 1689)
- April 29 – Eland Mossom, lawyer, recorder of the City of Kilkenny and representative in the Parliament of Ireland (b. 1709)

=== May ===
- May 1 – William Hewson, British physiologist (b. 1739)
- May 3 – Heinrich August de la Motte Fouqué, German general (b. 1698)
- May 4
  - Duke Anthony Ulrich of Brunswick, Russian general (b. 1714)
  - Adam Sherrill, First European to cross the Catawba River (b. 1697)
  - Richard Alchorne Worge, British Member of Parliament (b. 1707)
- May 6 – John Ward, 1st Viscount Dudley and Ward, British politician (b. 1704)
- May 8 – Réginald Outhier, French astronomer and priest (b. 1694)
- May 10
  - King Louis XV of France (b. 1710)
  - Timothy Woodbridge, Superintendent of Indian Affairs (b. 1709)
- May 12 – Giuseppe Antonio Luchi, Italian painter (b. 1709)
- May 17 – Jeremiah Theus, American artist (b. 1716)
- May 18 – William FitzRoy, 3rd Duke of Cleveland, English noble (b. 1698)
- May 23 – Tatiana Mikhailovna Troepolskaya, actor (b. 1744)
- May 26 – Wilhelm Reinhard von Neipperg, Austrian field marshal (b. 1684)

=== June ===
- June 3 – Joseph Gerrish, Canadian politician (b. 1709)
- June 7
  - Ignatius van der Beken, Flemish painter (b. 1689)
  - Charles Townley, Officer of Arms (b. 1713)
- June 11 – Emmerich Joseph von Breidbach zu Bürresheim, Roman Catholic archbishop (b. 1707)
- June 15 – Karl Heinrich von Bogatzky, German hymnwriter (b. 1690)
- June 18 – Francis Andrews, Irish politician (b. 1718)
- June 20 – Joshua Kirby, British artist (b. 1716)
- June 24 – Thomas Amory, English tutor/minister/poet (b. 1701)
- June 27 – Nicolas Tindal, British historian (b. 1688)
- June 29 – Zachary Pearce, English bishop (b. 1690)

=== July ===
- July 1 – Henry Fox, 1st Baron Holland, British politician (b. 1705)
- July 4 – William Price, Welsh High Sheriff and antiquarian (b. 1690)
- July 8 – Brooke Forester, British politician (b. 1717)
- July 9 – Anna Morandi Manzolini, internationally known Italian anatomist and anatomical wax modeller (b. 1714)
- July 11 – Sir William Johnson, 1st Baronet, Anglo-Irish official of the British Empire (b. 1715)
- July 13 – Otto von Münchhausen, German botanist (b. 1716)
- July 14
  - Matthew Blakiston, British politician (b. 1702)
  - James O'Hara, 2nd Baron Tyrawley, Irish officer in the British Army (b. 1682)
- July 17 – Miguel Anselmo Álvarez de Abreu y Valdéz, Bishop of Antequera, Oaxaca, México; Bishop (b. 1711)
- July 18
  - Sir Thomas Alston, 5th Baronet, English Baronet and MP (b. 1724)
  - Thomas Fitch, Governor of the Connecticut Colony (b. 1700)
- July 21 – Percy Wyndham-O'Brien, 1st Earl of Thomond, Irish earl (b. 1723)
- July 24
  - Caroline Fox, 1st Baroness Holland, British baroness; eldest of the Lennox sisters (b. 1723)
  - Johann George Schmidt, architect from Germany (b. 1707)
- July 25 – John Drummond, British private banker and politician (b. 1723)
- July 27 – Samuel Gottlieb Gmelin, German physician, botanist, and explorer (b. 1744)

=== August ===
- August 10
  - William Rawlinson Earle, British Member of Parliament (b. 1702)
  - Jean Charles Joseph, Count of Merode, Marquis of Deynze, noble of the Austrian Netherlands (b. 1719)
- August 11
  - Frederik Nannestad, Norwegian bishop (b. 1693)
  - Charles-François Tiphaigne de la Roche, French writer (b. 1722)
- August 13 – Peter Applebye, British-Danish industrialist (b. 1709)
- August 14 – Johann Jakob Reiske, German scholar, physician (b. 1716)
- August 20 – Ann Wager, American educator (b. 1716)
- August 21 – Imperial Noble Consort Qinggong, Qing Dynasty imperial noble consort (b. 1724)
- August 25 – Niccolò Jommelli, Italian composer (b. 1714)
- August 26 – Philipp Jakob Straub, Austrian sculptor (b. 1706)

=== September ===
- September 5 – Sir Charles Herbert Sheffield, 1st Baronet, British estate owner and baronet (b. 1706)
- September 10 – Pierre-Jean Mariette, French art historian (b. 1694)
- September 16 – Christophe Le Menu de Saint-Philbert, composer (b. 1720)
- September 18 – Johann Friedrich Meckel, the Elder, German anatomist (b. 1724)
- September 22
  - Filippo Farsetti, Italian patron (b. 1703)
  - Charles Louis, Duke of Schleswig-Holstein-Sonderburg-Beck (b. 1690)
  - Pope Clement XIV, pope and bishop of Rome from 1769 to 1774 (b. 1705)
- September 24 – Greta Donner, Swedish businesswoman (b. 1726)
- September 25
  - John Bradstreet, Canadian-born soldier (b. 1714)
  - Sir Richard Corbet, 4th Baronet, British Member of Parliament (b. 1696)
  - Sholto Douglas, 15th Earl of Morton, British earl (b. 1732)

=== October ===
- October 2 – Alfonso Clemente de Aróstegui, Scholar and Roman Catholic bishop (b. 1698)
- October 8 – Philippe Caffieri, French sculptor (b. 1714)
- October 11 – Jean-Claude Chambellan Duplessis, French designer (b. 1699)
- October 12 – Tokugawa Haruaki, Japanese samurai (b. 1753)
- October 13 – Willem Bentinck van Rhoon, Dutch politician (b. 1704)
- October 15 – Dmitry Ukhtomsky, Russian architect (b. 1719)
- October 16 – Robert Fergusson, Scottish poet and writer (b. 1750)
- October 22 – William Molineux, Colonial American merchant (b. 1718)
- October 23 – Michel Benoist, French Jesuit missionary, scientist (b. 1715)
- October 27 – Gerolamo Mengozzi Colonna, Italian painter (b. 1686)
- October 28 – Jean Löfblad, Swedish actor (b. 1728)
- October 29 – Ferdinand Augustin Hallerstein, Jesuit missionary (b. 1703)
- October 31
  - Thomas Hunt, English academic, Oxford Laudian Professor of Arabic (b. 1696)
  - Edward Noel, 1st Viscount Wentworth, British peer (b. 1715)

=== November ===
- November 1 – Johan Peter Falk, Swedish botanist (b. 1732)
- November 3 – Glocester Ridley, English writer (b. 1702)
- November 5
  - Urbain Boiret, Canadian priest (b. 1731)
  - Peter Spendelowe Lamborn, English engraver and miniature painter (b. 1722)
  - John Murray, 3rd Duke of Atholl, British peer (b. 1729)
- November 6 – Thomas Bradshaw, British Member of Parliament (b. 1733)
- November 13 – Robert Rochfort, 1st Earl of Belvedere, Anglo-Irish politician and peer (b. 1708)
- November 15 – Anne Howard, Countess of Effingham, British countess (b. 1695)
- November 16 – Francis Owen, British Member of Parliament (b. 1745)
- November 17 – Jean Althen, Armenian agronomist (b. 1709)
- November 20 – Abraham Tucker, English philosopher (b. 1705)
- November 21 – Johann Siegmund Popowitsch, Austrian botanist (b. 1705)
- November 22
  - Robert Clive, British military officer and East India Company official (b. 1725)
  - Edward Rooker, English engraver, draughtsman and actor (b. 1712)
- November 23 – Gottfried Bernhard Göz, German artist (b. 1708)
- November 25 – Henry Baker, English naturalist (b. 1698)
- November 28 – Pierre de l'Estache, French sculptor (b. 1688)
- November 29 – Gabriel de Clieu, Guadeloupean politician (b. 1687)
- November 30
  - John Rann, English criminal and highwayman (b. 1750)
  - Nicolas-François Dupré de Saint-Maur, French academic (b. 1695)

=== December ===
- December 2 – Johann Friedrich Agricola, German composer (b. 1720)
- December 5 – Karunai Prakasar, Spiritual writer and philosopher (b. 1756)
- December 13 – Guillaume du Tillot, French politician (b. 1711)
- December 16
  - Susanne von Klettenberg, German abbess and writer (b. 1723)
  - François Quesnay, French economist (b. 1694)
  - Francis Willoughby, 3rd Baron Middleton, British baron (b. 1726)
- December 17 – Friedrich Wilhelm, Graf von Wylich und Lottum, Prussian army officer (b. 1716)
- December 19 – Deborah Read, spouse of Benjamin Franklin (b. 1708)
- December 20 – Paul Whitehead, British satirist (b. 1710)
- December 21 – Thomas Broughton, English clergyman, biographer and miscellaneous writer (b. 1704)
- December 23 – Francesco Maria Preti, architect (b. 1701)
- December 24 – Peter Fenger, Danish merchant (b. 1719)
- December 26
  - Godfrey Bagnall Clarke, British politician (b. 1742)
  - Stephen Fox, 2nd Baron Holland, British politician and peer (b. 1745)
- December 27
  - Louis Groston de Saint-Ange de Bellerive, Canadian explorer (b. 1700)
  - Francis Wollaston, English scientist (b. 1694)
- December 29
  - Toussaint-Gaspard Taconet, French actor (b. 1730)
  - Maria Weenix, painter from the Northern Netherlands (b. 1697)
- December 30 – Antoniotto Botta Adorno, high officer (b. 1688)
- December 31 – Johann Christoph Handke, Czech painter (b. 1694)
- date unknown
  - Martinez de Pasqually, French freemason
  - Margaret Calderwood, British diarist (b. 1715)
  - Catherine Michelle de Maisonneuve, French writer and publisher
