= Brock (surname) =

Brock is an English and German surname.

== Notable people with the surname "Brock" include ==
=== A ===
- Alex Brock, British actor
- Alice Brock (born 1941), American artist
- Allison Brock (born 1979), American equestrian
- Amber Brock (born 1980), American author
- André Brock, American scholar
- Andrew C. Brock (born 1974), American politician

=== B ===
- Bazon Brock (born 1936), German art critic
- Bill Brock (1930–2021), American politician
- Bob Brock, American softball coach
- Brian Brock (born 1970), Scottish-American theologian
- Bryan Brock, American football player
- Buddy Brock (1952 or 1953–2025), American country music songwriter
- Burr Brock Sr. (1891–1968), American lawyer and politician

=== C ===
- Calvin Brock (born 1975), American boxer
- Calvin Brock (basketball) (born 1986), American basketball player
- Carol Brock (1923–2020), American food critic
- Cassie Brock (born 1991), Australian cricketer
- C. E. Brock (1870–1938), English illustrator
- Chad Brock (born 1963), American singer
- Charley Brock (1916–1987), American football player
- Chris Brock (born 1970), American baseball player
- Clyde Brock (born 1940), Canadian football player

=== D ===
- Dan W. Brock (1937–2020), American philosopher
- Daniel de Lisle Brock (1762–1842), English judge
- Dave Brock (born 1941), English singer-songwriter
- David Brock (disambiguation), multiple people
- Debbie Brock, American basketball player
- Dee Brock (born 1930), American educator
- Deidre Brock (born 1961), Australian-Scottish politician
- Dennis Brock (born 1995), German footballer
- Denton Brock (born 1971), English cricketer
- Dieter Brock (born 1951), American football player
- Dorothy Brock (1886–1969), English teacher

=== E ===
- Edmond Brock (1882–1952), English painter
- Eduardo Brock (born 1991), Brazilian footballer
- Edwin Brock (1927–1997), British poet
- Edwin C. Brock (1946–2015), American historian
- Emma L. Brock (1886–1974), American author
- Eric Brock (disambiguation), multiple people
- Eugene Brock (1853–1911), American politician
- Euline Brock (1932–2018), American politician

=== F ===
- Frank Arthur Brock (1888–1918), British pilot
- Fred Brock (born 1974), American football player
- Frederick Brock (disambiguation), multiple people

=== G ===
- Geoff Brock (born 1950), Australian former politician
- Geoffrey Brock (born 1964), American poet
- George Brock (disambiguation), multiple people
- Georgia Brock (born 2001), English rugby union footballer
- Gillian Brock, New Zealand philosopher
- Glenn Brock, Australian paleontologist
- Greg Brock (disambiguation), multiple people
- Gustav Brock (1881–1945), American painter
- Gustav Edvard Brock (1816–1878), Danish lawyer and politician

=== H ===
- Håkan Brock (born 1961), Swedish boxer
- Harry B. Brock Jr. (1925–2015), American banker
- Hayley Brock (born 1992), American soccer player
- Hella Brock (1919–2020), German musicologist
- Henry Brock, American football coach
- Herman Brock Jr. (born 1970), Dutch musician
- H. M. Brock (1875–1960), British painter
- Hugh Brock (1914–1985), British editor

=== I ===
- Isaac Brock (disambiguation), multiple people

=== J ===
- Jacob Brock (1810–1876), American steamboat captain
- James Brock (born 1976), Australian racing driver
- Jason V. Brock (born 1970), American writer
- Jeffrey Brock (born 1970), American mathematician
- Jeffry Hall Brock (1850–1915), Canadian businessman
- Jeremy Brock (born 1959), British writer
- Jesse Brock (born 1972), American artist
- Jim Brock (1937–1994), American college baseball coach
- Joey Brock (born 1988), Dutch footballer
- John Brock (disambiguation), multiple people
- Justin Bobby Brock, American entrepreneur

=== K ===
- Kadar Brock (born 1980), American artist
- Kara Brock (born 1974), American actress
- Kathy Brock (born 1959), American television personality
- Keenan Brock (born 1992), American sprinter
- Kevin Brock (disambiguation), multiple people
- Kristy Brock, American professor

=== L ===
- Larry Brock (born 1964), Canadian politician
- Laura Brock (born 1989), Australian footballer
- Laurence Brock (1879–1949), British civil servant
- Lawrence Brock (1906–1968), American politician
- Lou Brock (disambiguation), multiple people
- Ludvig Frederik Brock (1774–1853), Norwegian military officer
- Lyla Pinch Brock (born 1944), Canadian historian
- Lynn Brock (1877–1943), Irish novelist

=== M ===
- Malene Brock, Danish cricketer
- Margaret Susan Brock (1948–2023), Australian professor
- Matt Brock (disambiguation), multiple people
- Matthew Brock (disambiguation), multiple people
- Mel Brock (disambiguation), multiple people
- Michael Brock (1920–2014), British historian
- Mona Lee Brock (1932–2019), American teacher

=== N ===
- Napoleon Murphy Brock (born 1945), American singer
- Niels Brock (1731–1802), Danish merchant

=== O ===
- Osmond Brock (1869–1947), English naval officer

=== P ===
- Paul Brock (disambiguation), multiple people
- Pete Brock (born 1936), American race car driver
- Pete Brock (American football) (born 1954), American football player
- Peter Brock (disambiguation), multiple people
- Phillip Brock (born 1982), American football player

=== R ===
- Raheem Brock (born 1978), American football player
- Ralph E. Brock (1881–1959), American forester
- Randy Brock (born 1943), American politician
- Ray L. Brock Jr. (1922–2002), American judge
- Raymond Brock (1936–2008), English bridge player
- Reginald Walter Brock (1874–1935), Canadian geologist
- Renée Brock (1912–1980), Belgian writer
- Richard Brock (born 1938), English film producer
- Rita Nakashima Brock (born 1950), Japanese-American scholar
- Robert Brock (disambiguation), multiple people
- Roby Brock, American journalist
- Roslyn Brock (born 1965), American activist
- Rovenia M. Brock, American nutritionist
- Roy Gerard Corcor Brock (1884–1968), British army officer
- Russell Brock (1903–1980), British surgeon
- Russell Brock (volleyball), American volleyball coach

=== S ===
- Sally Brock (born 1953), English bridge player
- Sean Brock (born 1978), American chef
- Sebastian Brock (born 1938), British historian
- S. F. Brock (1880–1918), American race car driver
- Stan Brock (disambiguation), multiple people
- Stanley Brock (1931–1991), American actor
- Stephanie Brock, American chemist
- Stevie Brock (born 1990), American singer
- Stuart Brock (born 1976), English footballer

=== T ===
- Tarrik Brock (born 1973), American baseball player
- Thomas Brock (disambiguation), multiple people
- Timothy Brock (born 1963), American conductor
- Tony Brock (born 1954), British drummer
- Tramaine Brock (born 1988), American football player
- Tricia Brock (born 1979), American singer-songwriter
- Tricia Brock (director), American film director

=== U ===
- Ulrik Brock (born 1945), Danish sailor

=== W ===
- Wayne Brock (born 1948), American scout leader
- William Brock (disambiguation), multiple people

=== Z ===
- Zoë Brock (born 1974), New Zealand model

== Fictional characters ==
- Eddie Brock, a character in the comic book series Marvel Comics
- Tyler Brock, a character in the novel Tai-Pan
- Brock, a rocket launcher wielder rare brawler in mobile game Brawl Stars

== See also ==
- Brock (disambiguation), a disambiguation page for "Brock"
- Brock (given name), a page for people with the given name "Brock"
- General Brock (disambiguation), a disambiguation page for Generals surnamed "Brock"
- Justice Brock (disambiguation), a disambiguation page for Justices surnamed "Brock"
- Senator Brock (disambiguation), a disambiguation page for Senators surnamed "Brock"
- Bruch/Von dem Bruch/Vom Bruch, Bruche, Bruck/Brück/Brueck, von Bruck, Bruk
- Brucke/Brücke, Brücker, Brückner, Brückl
- Brog, Brugge/Brügge, Brüggen/Van Bruggen, van Brug, Brøgger/Brügger, Tebrügge, Bruegge
- Brock/Broeck, Brocke, Ten Broeck, Ten Broek, Ten Broeke, Van den Broek/Van den Broeck, Van den Broecke
