= Azlo =

American technology neobank company

- Type: Private
- Industry: Financial services
- Founded: 2017
- Founders: Brian Hamilton; Cameron Peake
- Defunct: March 31, 2021
- Headquarters: San Francisco, California, United States
- Key people: Cameron Peake (CEO); Bryan Crumpler (COO)
- Products: Small business banking
- Website: azlo.com

Azlo was an American technology neobank company which provided financial services for small businesses through a mobile app and website. In January 2021, the company announced that it was shutting down, and by the end of March 2021 it had closed all accounts.

== History ==
Azlo was founded in early 2017 by Brian Hamilton and Cameron Peake. It was developed within BBVA's New Digital Businesses division, which funds stand-alone financial technology startups. It was majority-owned by BBVA, utilized BBVA USA's banking license and payment infrastructure, but operated as an independent company.

The company tested its model with a small number of clients for a few months before launching in February 2018.

Azlo announced its closure on January 7, 2021, and closed all accounts by March 31, 2021.

== Business model ==
Azlo was a neobank, which means they utilize digital-only services model without traditional branch offices. Azlo focuses on small businesses - including sole proprietors, partnerships, corporations, and nonprofits. It specifically focuses on people engaged in the gig economy. It does not charge bank fees or have a balance requirement.

Its banking services were provided by BBVA USA. The platform utilized the Accenture Alnova modern core banking platform.

Their platform allowed users to send invoices and accept payments through PayPal and Square.

== Product Features ==
- Azlo focused on offering accounts to freelancers and small businesses.
- Accounts included Visa debit cards, mobile deposits, bill pay, and ACH payments as well as in-app invoicing.
- Azlo accounts had no fees and no minimum balance requirements.
- The Azlo mobile apps was available on iOS and Android.
- Eligibility requirements restricted Azlo accounts to U.S. citizens, permanent residents, and temporary residents with select visa types.

== See also ==
- BBVA USA
- Challenger bank
- Neobank
