= Compass Bank Building =

Compass Bank Building is the former name of buildings in the United States in which Compass Bancshares was a tenant:

- Daniel Building, Birmingham, Alabama
- Compass Bank Building (Albuquerque), New Mexico
