= John Brock =

John Brock may refer to:

- John Brock (baseball) (1896–1951), American Major League Baseball catcher
- John Brock (footballer) (1915–1976), English football goalkeeper
- John F. Brock (born 1948), American businessman and CEO of Coca-Cola
- John W. Brock (1914–1942), United States Navy pilot
- John Brock, fictional character by Desmond Skirrow
- John Brock (charity worker)

== See also ==
- Brock (surname)
