= Compass Bank =

Compass Bank may refer to:

- BBVA USA, formerly BBVA Compass and Compass Bancshares, a defunct American bank
- Compass Bank, a bank in New Bedford, Massachusetts, USA which was acquired by Sovereign Bank in 2004
