= Senator Brock =

Senator Brock may refer to:

== Members of the United States Senate ==
- Bill Brock (1930–2021), U.S. Senator from Tennessee from 1971 to 1977
- William Emerson Brock (1872–1950), U.S. Senator from Tennessee from 1929 to 1931

== United States state senate members ==
- Andrew C. Brock (born 1974), North Carolina State Senate
- Burr Brock Sr. (1891–1968), North Carolina State Senate
- Randy Brock (born 1943), Vermont State Senate
- Robert K. Brock (1878–1962), Virginia State Senate
