= General Brock =

General Brock may refer to:

- General Sir Isaac Brock, British hero of the war of 1812
- General Brock (wreck, 1846), a ship wrecked off Pigeon Island, in Lake Ontario, in 1846
- General Brock (wreck, 1826), a ship wrecked off the Grand Banks, in 1826
