= Kauzlarich =

Kauzlarich is a surname. Notable people with the name include:

- Richard Kauzlarich (born 1944), American diplomat, writer, and intelligence analyst
- Susan M. Kauzlarich (born 1958), American chemist
