= Steven Suib =

American inorganic chemist, academic and researcher

Steven L. Suib
- Born: Olean, New York
- Occupations: Inorganic chemist, academic and researcher
- Awards: Olin Research Award; SUNY Outstanding Achievement Award; Connecticut Medal of Science

Academic background
- Education: B.Sc., Chemistry and Geology; Ph.D., Chemistry
- Alma mater: State University College of New York; University of Illinois at Urbana-Champaign
- Thesis: The Nature of Active Sites in Catalytic Zeolites and Metal Dichalcogenide Inclusion Complexes (1979)
- Doctoral advisor: Galen D. Stucky

Academic work
- Institutions: University of Connecticut

Steven L. Suib is an American inorganic chemist, academic and researcher. He is a Board of Trustees Distinguished Professor of Chemistry at University of Connecticut. He is a director of the Institute of Materials Science and of the Center for Advanced Microscopy and Materials Analysis.

Suib's research primarily focuses on solid state inorganic chemistry, physical chemistry, environmental chemistry, inorganic photochemistry, plasma chemistry and photocatalysis. He has worked on the synthesis of new adsorbents, batteries, catalysts, ceramics, and semiconductors. He has published over 700 research papers and has registered around 80 patents in his name. Suib is the editor of books, New and Future Developments in Catalysis: Activation of Carbon Dioxide, New and Future Developments in Catalysis: Catalysis by Nanoparticles and New and Future Developments in Catalysis: Catalysis for Remediation and Environmental Concerns, among others.

== Education ==
Suib completed his bachelor's degree in chemistry and geology from the State University College of New York in 1975. He received his doctoral degree from University of Illinois at Urbana-Champaign in 1979.

== Career ==
After his Ph.D. studies, Suib joined the University of Illinois at Champaign-Urbana as a postdoctoral associate till 1980. He was then appointed by the University of Connecticut as an assistant professor at the department of chemistry. He was promoted to associate professor in 1986 and to professor, in 1989. In 2001, he became the Board of Trustees Distinguished Professor of Chemistry.

Along with his academic appointments, Suib has also held administrative appointments at University of Connecticut. He was the Chancellor's Research Fellow in 2000 and served as the head of department of chemistry from 2001 till 2011. In 2013, he was appointed as the director of the Institute of Materials Science at the university.

Suib is as a fellow of the American Chemical Society and National Academy of Inventors. He is the recipient of University of Connecticut Alumni Excellence in Research Award and Connecticut Medal of Science. He is an editor of Microporous and Mesoporous Materials, editor in chief for Materials, specialty chief editor of Frontiers in Green and Environmental Chemistry and field chief editor of Frontiers in Chemistry.

== Research ==
Suib has conducted research in the areas of solid state inorganic chemistry, physical and environmental chemistry, plasma chemistry, inorganic photochemistry and photo-catalysis. He has worked on the synthesis of new adsorbents, batteries, catalysts, ceramics, composites, sensors, and semiconductors. His research includes the study of redox catalytic cycles, green syntheses, heterogeneous catalysis and characterization of systems using structural, crystallographic, surface, electrochemical, luminescence, microscopic and EPR techniques.

=== Inorganic photochemistry ===
Suib took on inorganic photochemistry as a research interest in the 1980s. He studied photochemistry and the electron and energy transfer between rare earth and actinide ions in zeolites. His research indicated that selective placement of certain inorganic ions in zeolite molecular sieves can be used to control the energy transfer efficiencies in various displays and luminescence devices.

In a research article published in 1990, Suib studied the photochemistry of semiconductor surfaces and examined the in situ photo-reduction of tin sulfide by applying various analysis such as X-ray photoelectron spectroscopy, photogravimetric analysis and residual gas analysis. His research indicated that the photo-reduction process was dependent on the residual quantity of surface chloride ion during the manufacture of tin sulfide from tin chloride. His research also highlighted the possibility of doping semiconductors for the purpose of reduction initiation.

=== Photocatalysis ===
Suib researched about photo-catalysis along with his study on photochemistry in the 1980s. He conducted an experiment for the heterogeneous photo-catalytic oxidation of 1-Butene on tin oxide and titanium dioxide films. He prepared three films using a dip coating process and then studied their photo-activity under UV illumination. Suib investigated humidity effects and highlighted two functions of water in the experiment.

Suib studied photo-catalytic oxygen evolution from non-potable water by using a bio-inspired molecular water oxidation catalyst. His research group found that under specific conditions, the incorporation of manganese cubane clusters in Nafion membranes along with the illumination with light, led to water oxidation in an aqueous solution of sodium chloride and seawater. In the mid 2010s, Suib studied the viability of photo-catalytic oxidation technology for air purification. His group added to the research conducted by UTRC on the reaction rates of volatile organic compounds and then conducted validation studies on purifier prototypes. By analysis of the validation study outcomes, they identified the major constraints in the application of the aforementioned technology.

Suib used the mesoporous copper sulfide material in a visible light driven catalytic process for the transformation of amines into imines. He then applied reactive oxygen species determination studies and reaction kinetics to determine the surface chemistry of the catalyzed process.

=== Mesoporous and micro-porous materials ===
Suib focused on mesoporous and micro-porous materials as a research interest in the 1990s. Initially with researchers from Texaco, he studied micro-porous manganese oxides and discussed various developments and methods including redox precipitation, sol-gel processing and microwave heating for the synthesis of manganese oxides. He also discussed the tunnel structure of hollandites and todorokites along with the interlayer spacings of managanese oxides.

In the early 2010s, Suib studied the generation of crystalline, thermally controlled monomodal pore size mesoporous materials. He discussed the conditions needed for the generation of mesoporous materials, such as inverse milcelles, elimination of solvent effects and the controlled condensation of inorganic frameworks. According to Suib, manipulating the nanoparticle size can tune the mesopores, and this phenomenon can lead to the development of multiple phases of the same metal oxide and can also aid in the synthesis of materials having different structures and thermal stabilities.

For developing high-surface-area metal titanates, Suib proposed a generalized synthesis method involving a metal dissolution and reverse micelle formation. His research group produced the highest surface areas of such metals and used SEM-EDX and TEM mapping for the study of homogeneous distributions of the metals.

=== Environmental chemistry and green syntheses ===
Suib conducted his research on environmental chemistry and green synthesis in the early 2000s. He studied the catalytic degradation of methylene blue by applying green oxidation method having TBHP as the oxidant. The catalysts used in the oxidation method originate from a class of porous manganese oxides and are called octahedral molecular sieves. TBHP, rather than hydrogen peroxide, enhanced the methylene blue composition.

Suib synthesized copper aluminum mixed oxide catalyst, as a green approach for conducting one pot synthesis of imines. The synthesized catalysts, along with proving to be efficient in the direct amine formation process under solvent free conditions, also exhibited high stability and recyclability. By analyzing pyridine adsorption results, Suib found that an increased number of Lewis acidic sites contributed to an enhanced catalytic activity.

In early 2010s, Suib's research group carried out research on the major challenges in environmental chemistry in the context of energy, materials and nano-sized systems. He discussed different states of matter and highlighted various phenomena such as pollution and contamination. He stressed upon the need for green materials, energy sources, processes and green viable solutions for growth in healthy environments.

== Awards and honors ==
- 1986 – ACS Connecticut Valley Award
- 1991 – CT Yankee Ingenuity Award
- 1993 – Alumni Excellence in Research Award, University of Connecticut
- 1993 – Olin Research Award
- 1996 – NASA Fellowship
- 1998 – SUNY Outstanding Achievement Award
- 2005 – Chemical Pioneer Award
- 2009 – Northeast Region Award, American Chemical Society
- 2011 – Connecticut Medal of Science
- 2011 – Elected chair for the Applied Chemical Technology Subdivision, ACS
- 2017 – Excellence in Catalysis Award, NY Metropolitan Catalysis Society

== Bibliography ==
=== Books ===
- New and Future Developments in Catalysis: Activation of Carbon Dioxide (2013) ISBN 978-0444538826
- New and Future Developments in Catalysis: Solar Photocatalysis (2013) ISBN 978-0444538727
- New and Future Developments in Catalysis: Catalysis by Nanoparticles (2013) ISBN 978-0444538741
- New and Future Developments in Catalysis: Hybrid Materials, Composites, and Organocatalysts (2013) ISBN 978-0444538765
- New and Future Developments in Catalysis: Catalytic Biomass Conversion (2013) ISBN 978-0444538789
- New and Future Developments in Catalysis: Catalysis for Remediation and Environmental Concerns (2013) ISBN 978-0444538703
- New and Future Developments in Catalysis: Batteries, Hydrogen Storage and Fuel Cells (2013) ISBN 978-0444538802

=== Selected articles ===
- Yuan, J.; Liu, X.; Akbulut, O.; Hu, J.; Suib, S. L.; Kong, J.; Stellacci, F., Superwetting nanowire membranes for selective absorption, Nature Nanotechnology, 2008, 3, 332–336.
- Tian, Z. R.; Tong, W.; Wang, J. Y.; Duan, N.; Krishnan, V. V.; Suib, S. L. Manganese Oxide Mesoporous Structures : Mixed Valent Semiconducting Catalysts, Science, 1997, 276, 926–930.
- Meng, Y.; Song, W.; Huang, H.; Ren, Z.; Chen, S. Y.; Suib, S., Structure-Property Relationship of Bifunctional MnO2 Nanostructures: Highly Efficient, Ultra-Stable Electrochemical Water Oxidation and Oxygen Reduction Reaction Catalysts Identified in Alkaline Media, J. Am. Chem. Soc., 2014, 136, 11452–11464.
- Brock, S. L.; Duan, N.; Tian, Z. R.; Giraldo, O. Zhou, H.; Suib, S. L. A Review of Porous Manganese oxide materials, Chem. Mater., 1998, 10, 2619–2628.
- Njagi, E.; Huang, H.; Stafford, L.; Genuino, H.; Galindo, H.; Collins, J.; Hoag, G.; Suib, S. L., Biosynthesis of iron and silver nanoparticles at room temperature using aqueous sorghum bran Extracts, Langmuir, 2011, 27, 264–271.
