= Simple (bank) =

American neobank based in Portland, Oregon

Simple Finance Technology Corp.
- Formerly: BankSimple
- Industry: Financial services
- Founded: 2009 in Brooklyn, New York
- Founders: Shamir Karkal; Alex Payne; Joshua Reich
- Defunct: May 8, 2021
- Headquarters: Portland, Oregon
- Area served: United States
- Key people: David Hijirida (CEO); Susan Ehrlich (CFO)
- Number of employees: Over 300 (Nov 2015)
- Parent: Banco Bilbao Vizcaya Argentaria
- Website: simple.com

Simple (formerly BankSimple) was an American neobank based in Portland, Oregon. It was recognized as the first neobank and operated between 2009 and 2021.

The company provided FDIC-insured checking accounts to U.S. citizens, but not to permanent residents, through a partnership with U.S. Bancorp before transitioning over to BBVA USA. It was part of the Allpoint network for surcharge-free access to ATMs.

In 2014, Simple became part of Spanish bank Banco Bilbao Vizcaya Argentaria, one of the largest banks in Europe. On May 8, 2021, Simple was closed, and remaining accounts began to be transitioned to BBVA checking and savings accounts.

== History ==
Simple's logo from 2011 to 2016.

The company was originally founded as BankSimple in 2009 in Brooklyn, New York, by CEO Joshua Reich and CFO Shamir Karkal. The initial seed capital was provided by Jerry Neumann. In August 2011, the company raised $10 million from investors led by IA Ventures, Shasta Ventures and Dave McClure's fund 500 Startups. Later that month, the company moved its headquarters to Portland, Oregon, where five of the company's 17 employees already resided.

The company launched in 2012 as a limited beta.

By January 2013, the company had 20,000 customers and had processed more than $200 million in transactions. By July 2013, its customers had increased to 40,000 and total transaction values increased to greater than $1 billion. At the end of 2013, Simple reported processing on average around 13 debit transactions per minute with an overall customer balance of $64 million.

On February 20, 2014, Simple announced it had been acquired by Banco Bilbao Vizcaya Argentaria (BBVA). Paying through its subsidiary BBVA Compass, BBVA acquired Simple for $117 million. BBVA was also part of the initial venture funding. Simple later transitioned over to BBVA USA in 2016.

On May 14, 2018, co-founder Reich announced his plans to step down as the company's CEO.

In February 2020, Simple announced that its automated, round up savings feature had saved customers 1.2 million dollars in less than 4 months since the feature was introduced.

On May 8, 2021, Simple was formally closed, and remaining accounts began to be transitioned to BBVA checking and savings accounts.

== Business model ==
In contrast with traditional consumer banks, Simple had no physical branches. Instead, account-holders were issued Visa debit cards and had access to an online banking system accessible through Simple.com or mobile apps for Android or iOS. Simple earned revenue by collecting interest on customer deposits and through the collection of interchange fees.

== Features ==
- Simple mobile apps became available for iOS and Android in May 2011 and January 2013, respectively.
- Checks up to $9,500 USD were deposited through Simple's smartphone apps, or for any amount by postal mail or express courier. This amount that a customer is eligible to deposit at one time varies based upon length of time with the account had been open and number of checks previously deposited. All deposits were subject to a hold, regardless of customer status.
- A bill pay service printed checks and mailed them to specified recipients. Previously, Simple did not provide blank checks for customers, nor did it honor checks printed by a third party. However, in February 2018, a limited beta program was rolled out to specific customers which gave customers the ability to request free books of 25 checks via mail, with no fees associated with ordering or banking (i.e. returned checks or NSF fees). This program was in beta phase and was gradually rolled out to users throughout the first half of 2018. Simple’s “Bill Pay” service was shut down on July 9, 2019.
- Simple's online banking interface integrated hashtag searching, memos and location-based information for users' transaction history.
- Using the Goals feature, account holders were able to schedule automatic savings on a daily basis.
- Using the Expenses feature, account holders were able to schedule automatic goal allocations for the purposes of paying bills.

== Controversy ==
After BBVA acquired Simple, it required non-citizens of the US to open Simple accounts at a BBVA branch rather than online. A federal lawsuit challenging this practice was filed in 2018. Chattopadhyay v. BBVA Compass Bancshares, Inc., 4:19-cv-01541-JST (N.D. Cal. 2019).
