= William Gordon East =

English geographer and writer

William Gordon East (also W. G. East and W. Gordon East; 19 November 1902 – 27 January 1998) was an English geographer and writer. He studied at Cambridge University. He taught at the London School of Economics and Political Science.

His work includes the following books:

- The Union of Moldavia and Wallachia, 1859: An Episode in Diplomatic History
- The Geography behind History
- The Changing Map of Asia: A Political Geography
- An Historical Geography of Europe; 1st to 4th eds. Methuen, 1935, 1943, 1948, 1950
- The Soviet Union
- Our Fragmented World: An Introduction to Political Geography
- The Spirit and Purpose of Geography

For his essay on The Union of Moldavia and Wallachia, 1859: An Episode in Diplomatic History, he was awarded the Thirlwall Prize for 1927.
