= Matthew Brock =

Matthew Brock may refer to:

- Matthew Brock, eldest son of Jimmy and Jill on the American television show Picket Fences, played by Justin Shenkarow
- Matthew Brock (News Radio), character on the American television show NewsRadio, played by Andy Dick
- Matthew Brock (mason), leader of the National Grand Lodge
- Matt Brock (American football player) (born 1966), American football player defensive end
- Matt Brock (American football coach) (born 1988), American college football defensive coordinator
