= Justice Brock =

Justice Brock may refer to:

- David A. Brock (born 1936), associate justice of the New Hampshire Supreme Court
- Ray L. Brock Jr. (1922–2002), associate justice of the Tennessee Supreme Court
- Walter E. Brock (1916–1987), associate justice of the North Carolina Supreme Court
