= Thirlwall Prize =

Essay award given by Cambridge University

Since 1884, the Thirlwall Prize was instituted at Cambridge University in the memory of Bishop Connop Thirlwall, and has been awarded during odd-numbered years, for the best essay about British history or literature for a subject with original research. It was instituted on the condition that a foundation a medal is awarded in alternate years for the best dissertation involving original historical research, together with a sum of money to defray the expenses of publication. From 1885, the Prince Consort Prize was awarded in alternate years.

== Winners ==
Winners of the Thirlwall Prize include:

- 1889 The Constitutional Experiments of the Commonwealth by E. Jenks
- 1891 The Doctrine of Consideration in English Law by F. Aidan Hibbert
- 1897 English Democratic Ideas in the Seventeenth Century by G. P. Gooch
- 1905 The Second Athenian Confederacy by F.H. Marshall
- 1907 Claudian as an Historical Authority by J. H. E. Crees
- 1913 To Bartolus of Sassoferrato: his Position in the History of Medieval Political Thought by C. N. S. Woolf
- 1917 The People's Faith in the Time of Wyclif by Bernard Lord Manning
- 1923 Etruria and Rome by R. A. L. Fell
- 1927 The Union of Moldavia and Wallachia, 1859 by William Gordon East
- 1929 Scipio Africanus in the Second Punic War by Howard Hayes Scullard
- 1931 Methodism & Politics, 1791-1851 by Ernest Richard Taylor
- 1933 Aratos of Sicyon by F.W. Walbank
- 1935 Senate and Provinces at the end of the Republic by J. Macdonald
- 1937 The Theory of Religious Liberty in England, 1603-39 by Thomas Lyon
- 1937 The King's Secretary and the Signet Office in the XV century by [A.] J. Otway-Ruthven
- 1939 Lord Liverpool and Liberal Toryism 1820-1827 by W. R. Brock
- 1941 Bishop Reginald Pecock; a study in ecclesiastical history and thought by V. H. H. Green

== See also ==
- List of history awards

== Sources ==
- Endowments of the University of Cambridge, published in 1904, by John Willis Clark
