= William Brock =

William Brock may refer to:

- Bill Brock (1930–2021), American senator
- William Brock (Australian politician) (1851–1913), member of the Tasmanian House of Assembly
- William Rees Brock (1836–1917), Canadian politician
- William Brock (pastor) (1807–1875), British nonconformist minister
- William A. Brock (born 1941), American economist
- William E. Brock (1872–1950), American politician, grandfather of Bill Brock
- William S. Brock (1895–1932), American aviator
- William John Brock (1817–1863), religious writer
- William Hodson Brock (1936–2025), British chemist and science historian
- William Brock (historian) (1916–2014), British historian of the United States.
- William Brock (MP), MP for City of Chester
