= Matt Brock =

Matt Brock may refer to:

- Matt Brock (American football player) (born 1966), American football player defensive end
- Matt Brock (American football coach) (born 1988), American college football defensive coordinator
