= Carlos Torres Vila (banker) =

Spanish banker (born 1966)

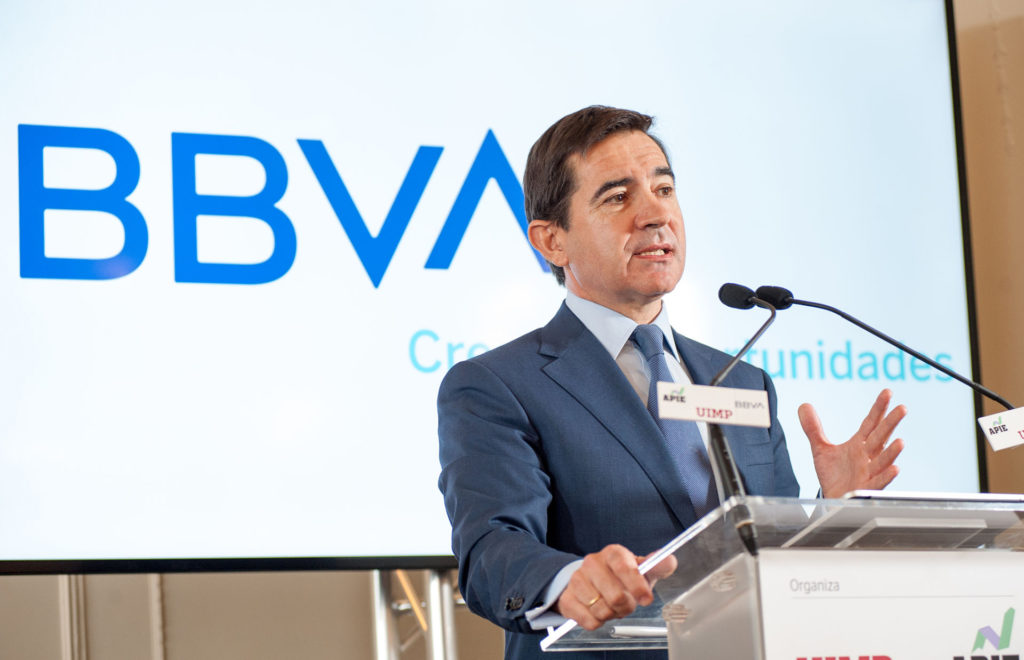
- Born: 24 February 1966 (age 60); Salamanca, Spain
- Education: Massachusetts Institute of Technology; Sloan School of Management
- Occupation: Banker
- Title: CEO, Banco Bilbao Vizcaya Argentaria
- Term: May 2015–
- Board member of: Garanti Bank

Carlos Torres Vila (born in Salamanca, 24 February 1966) is a Spanish banker. He has been the chairman of Banco Bilbao Vizcaya Argentaria (BBVA) since 1 January 2019, replacing Francisco González.

== Education ==
Torres Vila completed his undergraduate degree in electrical engineering and business at the Massachusetts Institute of Technology, and earned an MBA from the Sloan School of Management at the same university. Torres Vila also holds a law degree from UNED.

== Career ==
Torres Vila began his career at the consulting firm McKinsey & Company, where he became partner in 1997.

Torres Vila was later recruited by Endesa as director of strategy and corporate development, where he was subsequently appointed a member of the steering committee and director of finance/CFO.

In September 2008, Torres Vila joined Banco Bilbao Vizcaya Argentaria (BBVA) as director of corporate strategy and development and a member of its management committee.

In March 2014, Torres Vila was appointed as digital banking director, a position that he held until May 2015, when he replaced his predecessor Ángel Cano as president and COO of BBVA in order to accelerate the transformation of the bank.

He was appointed president of BBVA on 29 November 2018, taking office on 1 January 2019. He has overseen the bank's strategic expansion and digital initiatives. In 2025, he led a takeover bid for Banco de Sabadell, subject to regulatory conditions set by the Spanish government. During his tenure, BBVA also launched cryptocurrency trading and custody services for retail clients in Spain under the EU's Markets in Crypto-Assets Regulation (MiCA), and explored the use of blockchain technology in banking operations. In 2024, he received a total of 7.93 million euros as chairman of BBVA (+ 3,89%).

== Other activities ==
=== Corporate boards ===
- Banco Bilbao Vizcaya Argentaria, Member of the Board of Directors
- Garanti BBVA, Member of the Board of Directors

=== Non-profit organizations ===
- Endeavor España, Member of the Board of Trustees
- Fundación BBVA, Chairman of the Board
- Institute of International Finance, Member of the Board of Directors
- European Financial Services Roundtable (EFR), Member
- Elcano Royal Institute, Member of the Board of Trustees
- Fundación de Ayuda contra la Drogadicción, Member of the Board of Trustees
