= Julia Chan (chemist) =

American chemist and researcher

Julia Y. Chan
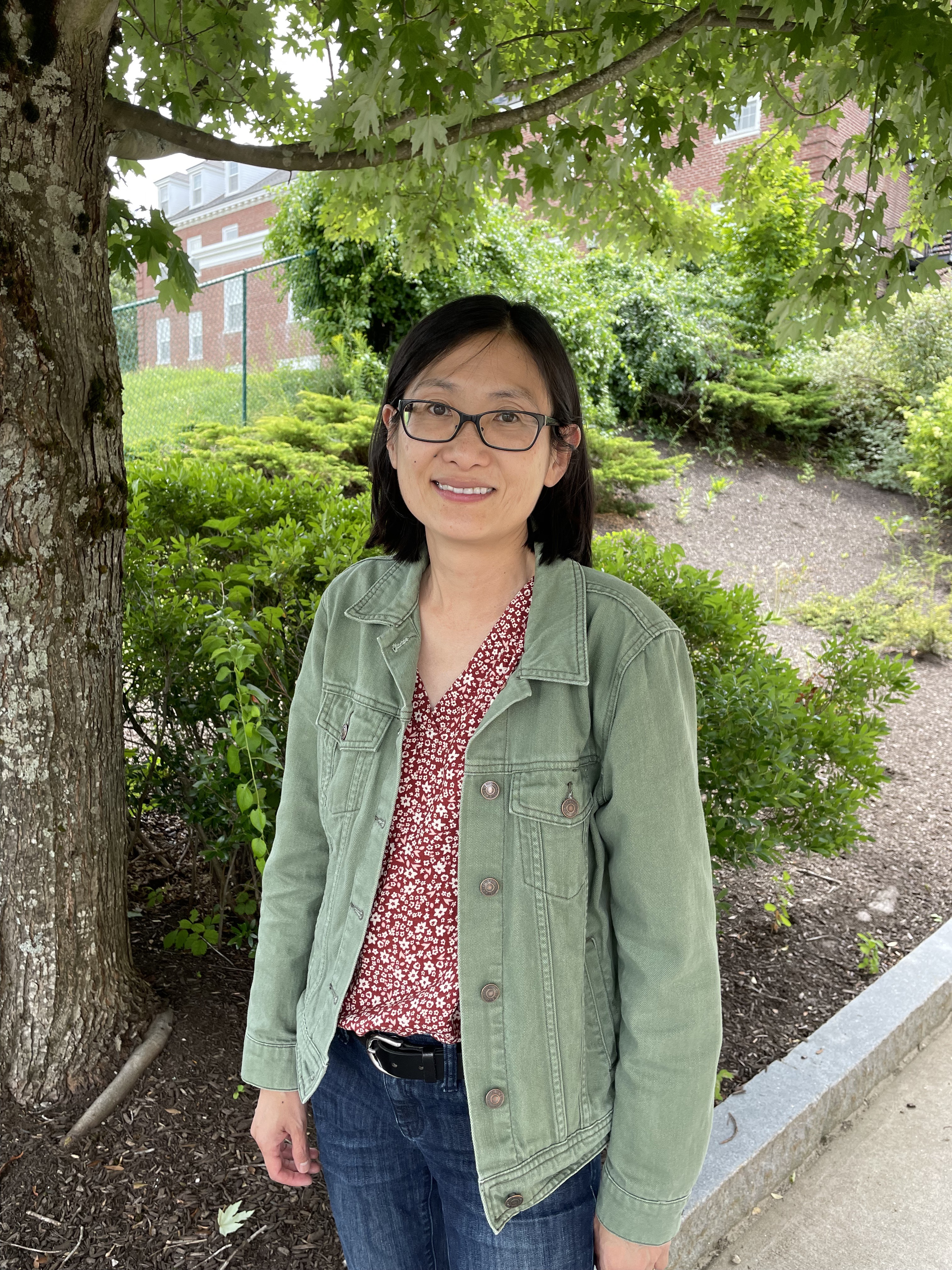
- Julia Chan at GRC SSC 2022
- Education: University of California, Davis (PhD); Baylor University (BS)
- Awards: ACS Fellow (2024), AAAS Fellow (2019)
- Scientific career
- Workplaces: University of Texas at Dallas; Louisiana State University; National Institute of Standards and Technology
- Doctoral advisor: Susan M. Kauzlarich

Julia Y. Chan is a professor of chemistry and biochemistry at Baylor University. Chan is an expert in the area of intermetallic crystal growth with a focus on new quantum materials. She is a fellow of both the American Chemical Society and the American Association for the Advancement of Science.

== Early life and education ==
Chan moved to New York City at the age of eight and spent her childhood in North America. Chan studied at Baylor University and graduated in 1993. Initially a music major – specialising in the violin – she soon became interested in chemistry. At Baylor, Chan worked under the supervision of Carlos Manzanares and Marianna Busch. She earned her doctoral degree under the supervision of Susan M. Kauzlarich at the University of California, Davis in 1998. Chan completed postdoctoral research in the ceramics division at the National Institute of Standards and Technology. She has continued to play violin in her church orchestra.

== Research and career ==
Chan began her career as an assistant professor of chemistry at Louisiana State University in 2000. In 2002 she was awarded an National Science Foundation CAREER Award and selected as one of the American Chemical Society women making an impact in chemistry. In 2004 Chan was awarded an ExxonMobil Faculty Fellowship Award. She was part of the 2010 American Chemical Society Women Chemists of Colour Summit. She joined the chemistry department at University of Texas at Dallas as a full professor in 2013. In 2022 Chan moved to Baylor University and currently the Fenn Family Chair in Materials Science.

At Baylor University, Chan investigates the physical properties of magnetic materials synthesized in her laboratory, with a focus on the growth and characterization of quantum materials . She has developed new techniques to grow single crystals of intermetallic phases. She was the Guest Editor of the American Chemical Society Inorganic Chemistry theme issue on Solid-State Inorganic Chemistry. In 2019 Chan was inducted into the American Association for the Advancement of Science.

=== Awards and honors ===
Her awards and honors include:

- 2003 American Crystallographic Association Margaret C. Etter Early Career Award
- 2004 Alfred P. Sloan Research Fellowship
- 2006 Baylor Alumni Association Outstanding Young Alum
- 2008 Iota Sigma Pi Agnes Fay Morgan Research Award
- 2016 University of Texas at Dallas Women Leading in Diversity Honouree
- 2019 American Chemical Society Wilfred T. Doherty Award for Excellence in Chemistry
- 2019 Elected Fellow of the American Association for the Advancement of Science
- 2024 Named Fellow of the American Chemical Society

=== Selected publications ===
Her publications include:

- Chan, Julia Y. (2006-03-03). "Metallic spin-liquid behavior of the geometrically frustrated Kondo lattice Pr2Ir2O7". Physical Review Letters. 96 (8) 087204. Bibcode:2006PhRvL..96h7204N. doi:10.1103/PhysRevLett.96.087204. PMID 16606220. S2CID 2201650.
- Chan, Julia Y. (1998-11-16). "Structure and ferromagnetism of the rare-earth zintl compounds: Yb14MnSb11 and Yb14MnBi11". Chemistry of Materials. 10 (11): 3583–3588. doi:10.1021/cm980358i.
- Chan, Julia Y. (1997-12-16). "Colossal Magnetoresistance in the Transition-Metal Zintl Compound Eu14MnSb11". Chemistry of Materials. 9 (12): 3132–3135. doi:10.1021/cm9704241.

Chan is a Deputy Editor of Science Advances.
