= Pigeon Island (Lake Ontario) =

History of Pigeon Island in Lake Ontario, Canada

Coordinates: 44°03′59″N 76°32′59″W

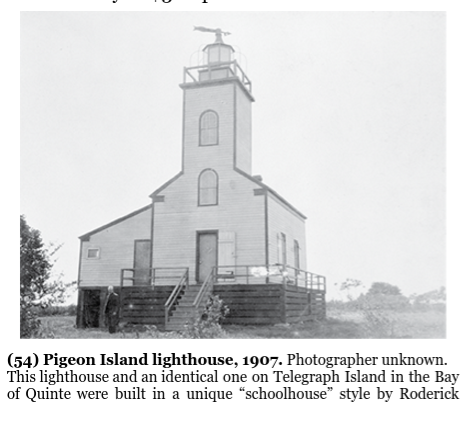
The Pigeon Island lighthouse, in 1907, illustrating the 'schoolhouse style' lighthouse.

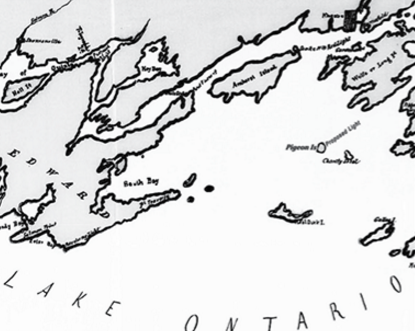
Map drawn in 1870 showing the location of the Pigeon Island lighthouse

Pigeon Island is a small island, in Lake Ontario, near Kingston Ontario. The island had been a navigational hazard since the founding of Kingston, Ontario. A lighthouse was first built on Pigeon Island in 1870.

Vessels wrecked on or near the island, prior to the construction of the lighthouse, include: the General Brock wrecked in 1846; the Royal Susan, in 1853; the Governor in 1862; the Young America in 1863; and the Annexation in 1866.

The island covers about 5 hectares (12 acres). Shallow soil and bird guano cover a limestone base.

The island supports a large population of birds.

The original lighthouse was the first built in what came to be known as the "schoolhouse style", where the lighthouse tower was integrated into the lightkeeper's cottage. The current lighthouse is a steel frame.
