= Paul Brock =

Paul Brock may refer to:

- Paul Brock (journalist) (1932–2021), American journalist and film producer
- Paul Brock (musician) (born 1944), Irish musician
- Paul D. Brock (born 1958), British entomologist
