= Eric Brock =

Eric Brock may refer to:

- Eric Brock (safety) (born 1985), American football safety
- Eric Brock (American football coach), American football coach in the United States
