= R. A. L. Fell =

Roland Arthur Lonsdale Fell (1895‑1973) was a British classical scholar educated at Cambridge, the author of Etruria and Rome, an important work on the Etruscan civilization for which he won the 1923 Thirlwall Prize; and co-author with Thomas Ashby of a widely cited paper, The Via Flaminia. In later life he largely set aside his antiquarian interests, being ordained an Anglican deacon in 1923, and a priest the following year.

He served in the Church of St. George, Camberwell, London from 1923 to 1927; then as a missionary for the Society for the Propagation of the Gospel in Ahmednagar, India (1927‑1937) during which time he was Examining Chaplain to the Bishop of Nasik (1932‑1937) and to the Bishop of Bombay (1935‑1937). Returning to England he was vicar at Wylde Green, Birmingham (1938‑1942); vicar at St James' Church, Edgbaston, Birmingham (1942‑1946); vicar of Bradninch, Devon (1946‑1966); and rural dean of Cullompton, Devon (1954‑1955). In 1966 he was licensed to officiate in the Diocese of Exeter, and came to live in Exmouth, Devon.
