= Mona Lee Brock =

American teacher, farm advocate, and counsellor (1932–2019)

- Born: Mona Lee Bruster; January 1, 1932; Madill, Oklahoma, US
- Died: March 19, 2019 (aged 87); Durant, Oklahoma, US
- Occupation: Teacher
- Known for: Farm advocate and crisis support counsellor

Mona Lee Brock (January 1, 1932 – March 19, 2019) was an Oklahoma school teacher, farm advocate and crisis support counsellor. She was commonly referred to as "the Angel on the end of the line".

== Early life ==
She was born Mona Lee Bruster on a farm in Madill, Oklahoma to farmer Floyd Bruster and Ada Roninson, one of eight children. She attended Kingston High School. In 1947 she met F.M. Brock, a farmer and they married on 12 July, the same year. They would farm together in Lincoln County, Oklahoma. In later life, she attended Southeastern State College where in 1964, she obtained a bachelor's degree in education. Further studies saw her obtain a master's degree in Education in 1967 from the University of Oklahoma. She became a teacher in the Moore Public School system, Oklahoma, a guidance counsellor and principal.

== Later life ==
During the 1980s, American farming faced a crisis made of droughts, poor commodity prices, higher production costs, bad loans and a Russian embargo on grain. These factors left farmers struggling to survive and Mona Lee set out personally to try to save farms and farmers. She started by organising gatherings at her home in Lincoln County where local farmers could talk about how to survive. She would later bring together farmers, lawyers, businessmen and bankers as advocates for their cause. As suicides amongst farmers increased she started personally taking phone calls from them seven days a week at any hour. She or others would attempt to reach those farmers while they were kept on the line, sometimes with success and sometimes not. Willie Nelson came to hear about her, making contact with her and personally helped finance her causes. He would later go on to form Farm Aid which would raise over $50 million for aid. She was approached by the Oklahoma Conference of Churches who wanted to set up a suicide intervention hotline. She assisted them by moving her operation to Oklahoma City to help set up a state-wide hotline.

== Death ==
She died in Durant, Oklahoma of congestive heart failure. Her husband died in 1986 and a son Gary in 2003.

== Honours ==
In May 2018, she received a Citation from the Oklahoma House of Representatives for advocating on behalf of farmers in the state.

== Media ==
She appeared in the 2015 Farm Aid documentary, Homeplace Under Fire, that examines the American farm crises of the 1980s.
