= David Brock (disambiguation) =

David Brock (born 1962) is an American journalist and author.

David Brock or Dave Brock may also refer to:

- Dave Brock (born 1941), English musician
- Dave Brock (American football) (born 1967), American football coach
- David Brock (lacrosse) (born 1986), Canadian lacrosse player
- Dave Brock (fl. 2000s–2010s), a singer with Manzarek–Krieger
- David A. Brock (born 1936), chief justice of the New Hampshire Supreme Court

== See also ==
- D. Brock Hornby (born 1944), American federal judge
- David Brockhoff (1928–2011), Australian rugby player called Brock
- David Brock Smith (fl. 2017), Oregon state representative
- Dave Brockie (1963–2014), Canadian-American heavy metal musician
