= Justin Brock =

American businessperson

Justin Chapman Brock
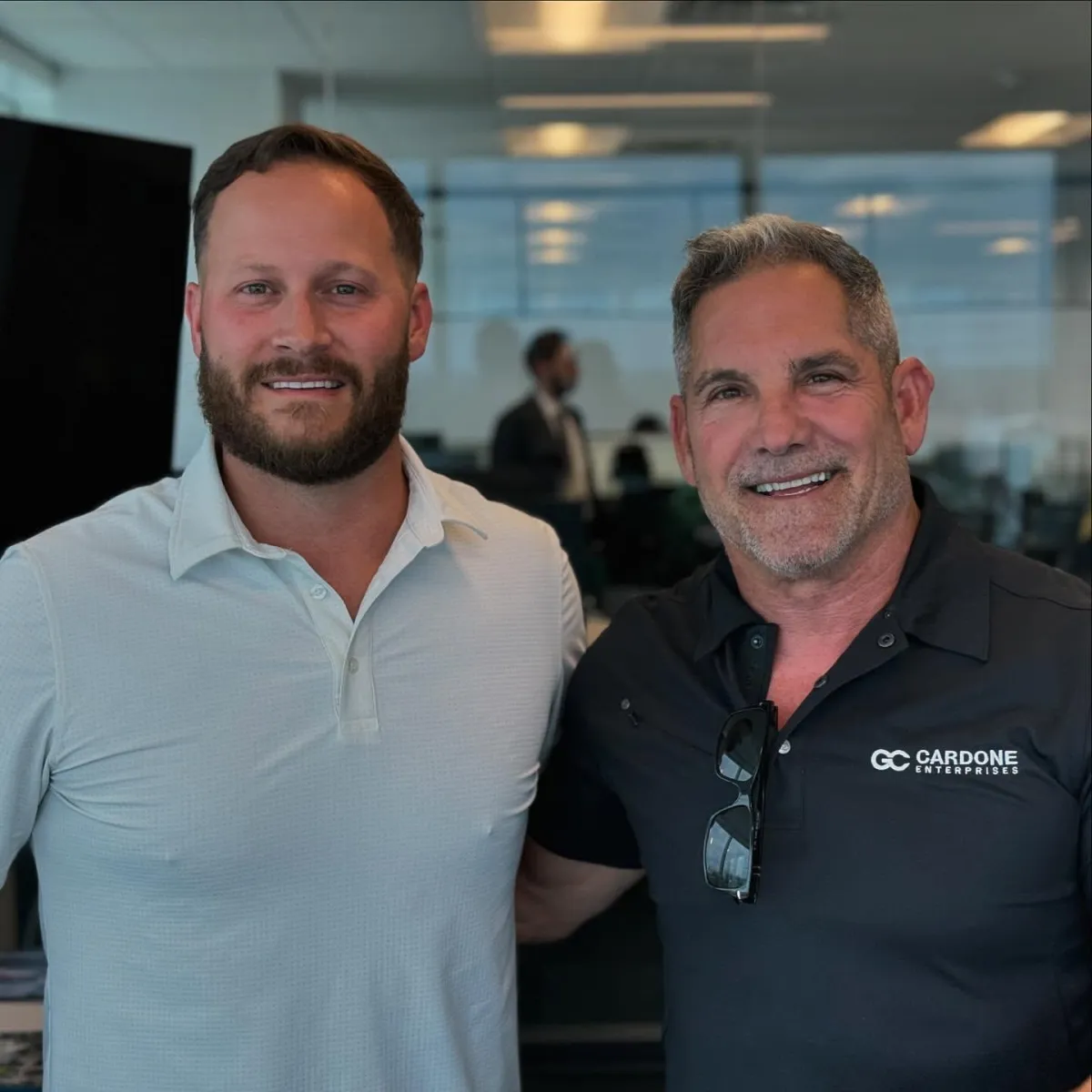
- Justin Brock visits Grant Cardone at 10X HQ to talk Real Estate Investing
- Born: United States
- Education: American Military University
- Occupations: Entrepreneur, author, US Marine veteran
- Known for: Founding the MedicareCon convention
- Website: justinbrock.com

Justin Chapman Brock is an American entrepreneur, author, and US Marine veteran. He is best known for founding MedicareCon, GoGuru Pro CRM and GoGuru University, and CEO of Brock.

== Career ==
In 2006, Brock enlisted in the United States Marine Corps and served as an operations analyst with the Marine Aerial Refueler Transport Squadron 352 Detachment A during his deployment in Iraq until 2008. Brock was subsequently appointed as the operations NCO for Marine Aerial Refueler Squadron 252. In 2011, he advanced to the role of operations chief for Marine All-Weather Fighter Attack Squadron 242 in Japan. In 2014, he received his honorable discharge. The company is a national brokerage firm that was founded by Justin and provides medicare supplement plans, ACA plans for the under-65 market, medicare advantage and medicare Part D plans. In 2023, Brock was named to the Inc. 5000 list of the Fastest Growing Private Companies in America.

In 2020, Brock founded MedicareCon, an annual convention for Medicare insurance and health insurance agents. In 2024, Amerilife bought 51% of Brock's companies for $70 million. In the same year, he developed the insurance CRM system GoGuru to facilitate the sharing of information between agents and brokers, and the virtual educational and training platform, GoGuru University.

== Selected publications ==
- Brock, Justin (2024-11-13). Purpose After Service: From Marine to Millionaire. Justin Brock. ISBN 979-8346677734.
- Brock, Justin (2023-09-15). The Medicare Bible. Justin Brock. ISBN 979-8861512633.
- Brock, Justin (2023-08-24). Medicare Marketing Manual. Justin Brock. ISBN 979-8-8580-6583-8.
- Brock, Justin; Travers, Ryan (2022-03-01). Medicare Breakdown: The Alphabet Soup of Medicare. Justin Brock. ISBN 979-8425095626.
- Brock, Justin (2021-04-16). Medicare Breakdown: The Alphabet Soup of Medicare. Justin Brock. ISBN 979-8733532264.
