= Banco Bilbao Vizcaya Argentaria =

Spanish multinational financial services company

Banco Bilbao Vizcaya Argentaria, S.A.

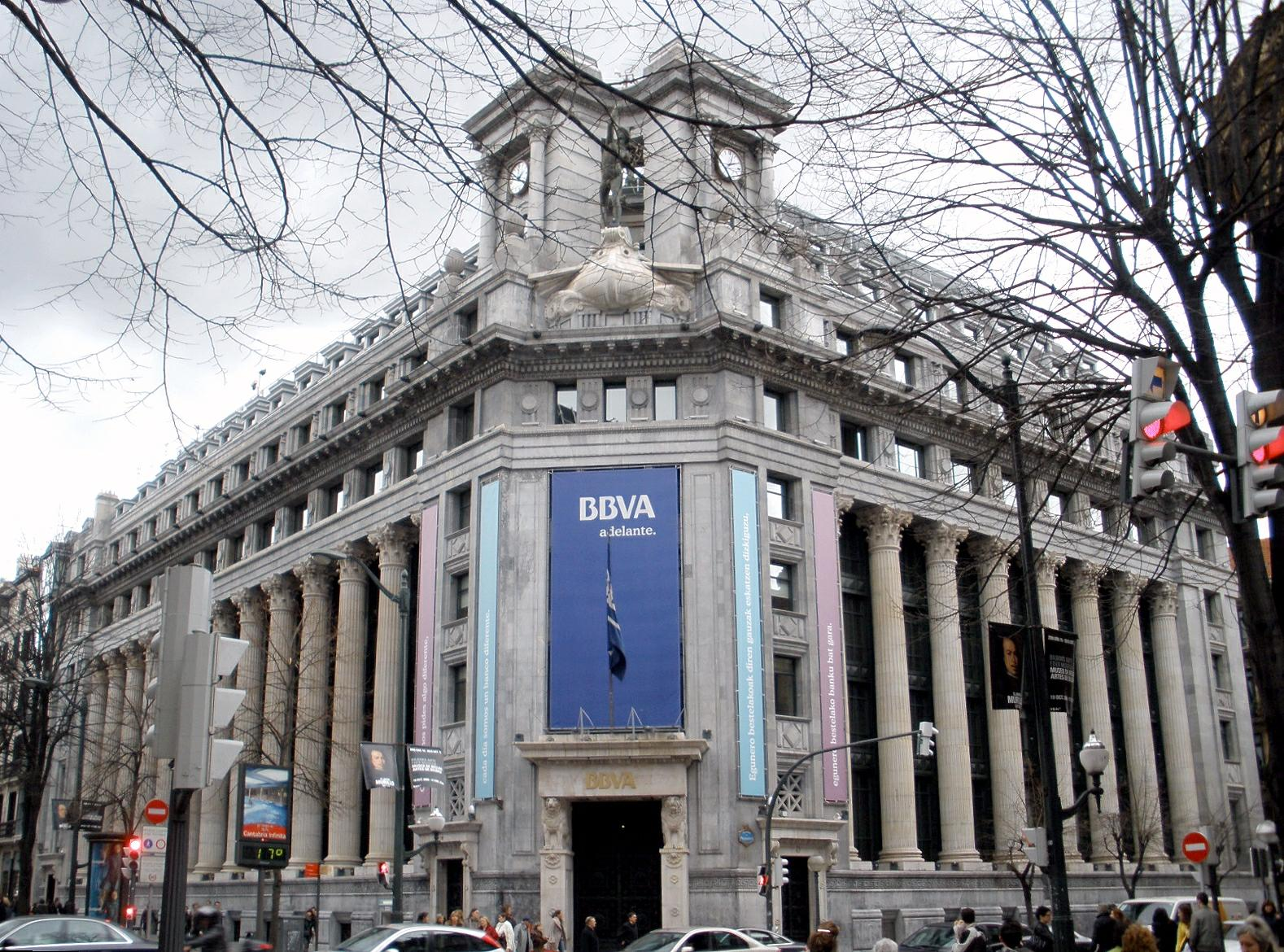
- BBVA head-office building in Bilbao
- Trade name: BBVA
- Type: Public
- Traded as: BMAD: BBVA; NYSE: BBVA; BMV: BBVA; IBEX 35
- ISIN: ES0113211835
- Industry: Financial services
- Predecessor: Banco Bilbao Vizcaya, S.A.; Argentaria, S.A.
- Founded: Bilbao, Spain; 28 May 1857; 169 years ago
- Headquarters: Bilbao and Madrid, Spain
- Key people: Carlos Torres Vila (Group Executive Chairman); Onur Genç (CEO)
- Products: Retail banking; corporate banking; investment banking; insurance; private banking; private equity; mortgage loans; credit cards; investment management; wealth management; asset management; mutual funds; exchange-traded funds; index funds
- Revenue: ▲€36.93 billion (2025)
- Operating income: ▲€22.55 billion (2025)
- Net income: ▲€10.51 billion (2025)
- Total assets: ▲€859.57 billion (2025)
- Total equity: ▲€61.79 billion (2025)
- Number of employees: ▲127,174 (2025)
- Website: www.bbva.com

Banco Bilbao Vizcaya Argentaria, S.A. (Spanish: [ˈbaŋko βilˈβao βiθˈkaʝa aɾxenˈtaɾja]), better known by its initialism BBVA, is a Spanish multinational financial services company headquartered in Bilbao, with operative offices in Madrid. As one of the largest financial institutions globally, BBVA's core markets are primarily concentrated in Spain, Mexico, South America, and Turkey.

The bank was founded as Banco de Bilbao, on 28 May 1857, in Bilbao. BBVA's operational headquarters are located in Madrid, in the Ciudad BBVA complex. It is Spain's second-largest bank after Banco Santander. It is listed on the Madrid Stock Exchange, the New York Stock Exchange and on the Mexican Stock Exchange. It is also a part of the IBEX 35 as well as the Dow Jones EURO STOXX 50.

On 2 April 2018, it was ranked the 42nd largest bank in the world by total assets. In 2022, BBVA was recognized as the country's overall best-performing bank by The Banker. BBVA has been designated as a Significant Institution since the entry into force of European Banking Supervision in late 2014, and as a consequence is directly supervised by the European Central Bank. As of 31 December 2025, BBVA's assets amounted to around €859 billion, making it the second-largest Spanish financial institution by volume of assets. At that same date, it had 5,642 offices, 127,174 employees and 81.2 million customers, and was present in more than 25 countries.

== History in Spain ==
=== Banco de Bilbao and Banco de Vizcaya ===
The history of BBVA began in 1857 in Bilbao, a city located in the Basque part of northern Spain, when the Board of Trade promoted the creation of Banco de Bilbao as an issuing and discount bank. Banco de Vizcaya was founded in 1901 and carried out its first operations in Bilbao. Little by little, it spread throughout the country. In 1988, the merger agreement between Banco de Bilbao and Banco de Vizcaya was signed. And in 1989, the BBV brand was adopted.

=== Merger of BBV and Argentaria: creation of BBVA ===
BBVA's former logo

In 1991, the Spanish government of Felipe González created the public bank Argentaria, grouping in it the Spanish public banks. Subsequently, between 1993 and 1998 the process of privatization of the entity was carried out. BBV and Argentaria announced their merger project on 19 October 1999, with the aim of continuing to create value. The new bank (BBVA) was born with a significant size, a strong financial solvency and a large financial structure, an adequate geographical diversification of business and risks and, as a consequence of all this, a greater potential for profit growth.

=== Acquisitions of Unnim Banc and Catalunya Banc ===
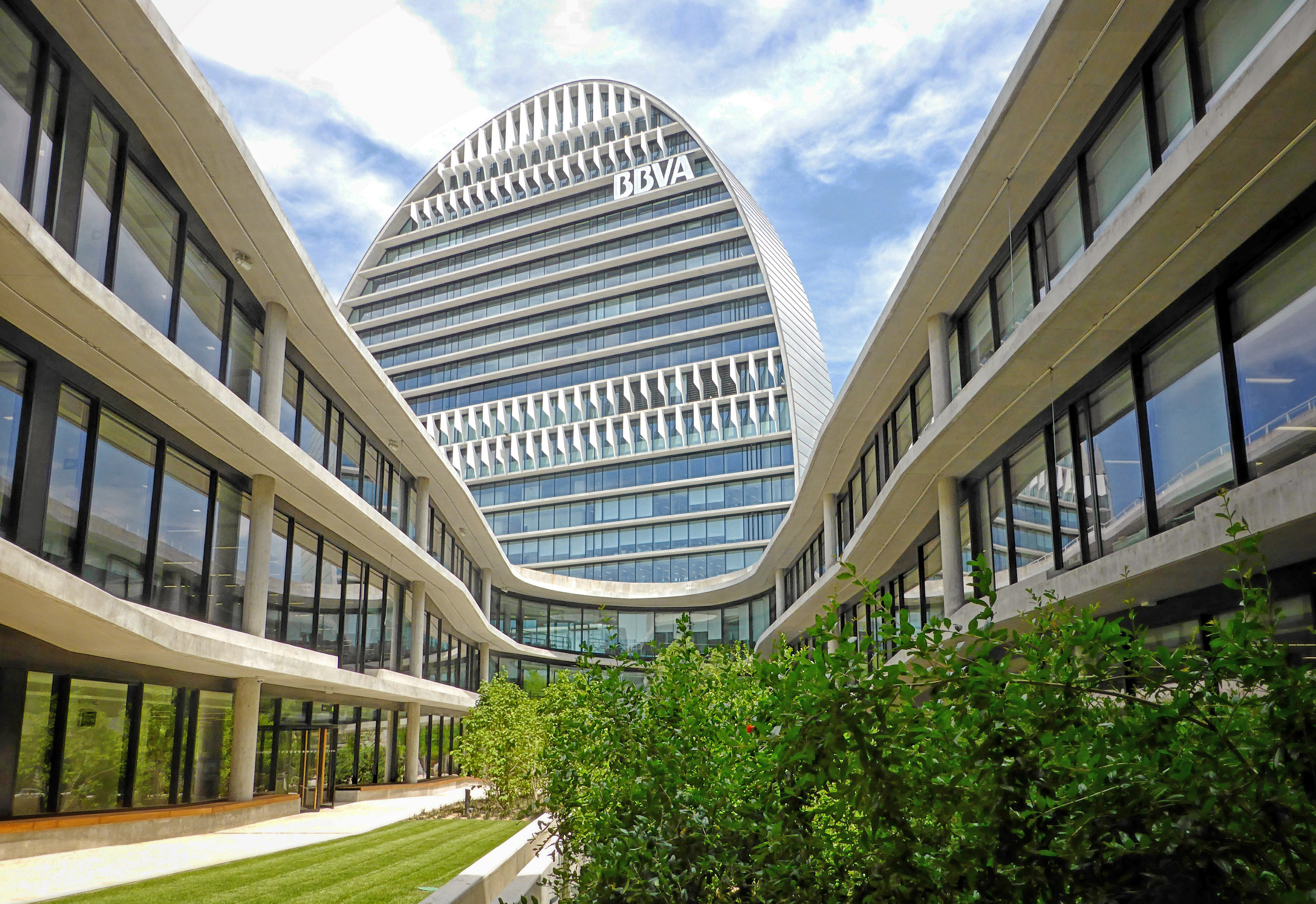
BBVA head offices in Madrid

After several years dedicated to external growth, BBVA takes advantage of the restructuring of the financial system in Spain to grow especially in Catalonia, one of the regions where it had the lowest market share. To this end, it acquired between 2012 and 2014 the two financial groups nationalized by the Government of Spain (Unnim Banc and Catalunya Banc), which grouped 6 Catalan savings banks.

In 2020, BBVA entered into negotiations with smaller competitor Banco Sabadell to create Spain's second-biggest domestic lender by assets; according to Reuters, the bank would have nearly 600 billion euros ($710.52 billion) in assets in Spain and a combined market value, based on the share prices at the time, of 26.7 billion euros. Shortly after, both parties ended their talks after failing to agree on price. Later on in May 2024, BBVA presented a $13.11 billion takeover bid directly to Sabadell's shareholders. However, the Economy Ministry has the power to block any merger or acquisition of a bank, meaning that the Spanish government has six months to decide whether to block this takeover.

In December 2024, BBVA was confirmed on getting approval for taking indirect control of Sabadell’s Mexican businesses. On 30 January 2025, BBVA plans to buy back shares worth 993 million euros ($1billion) after the Spanish market supervisor lifted their restriction on new repurchase plans it has imposed over BBVA’s takeover bid for Sabadell.

=== Digital transformation ===
In 2007, the firm started an initiative to digitally transform the bank. Following implementation, it saw a 19% year-on-year increase in new customers. As of 2015, the total number of these clients stood at 14.8 million. In 2019, BBVA decided to unify its brand worldwide and introduced a new logo. This meant the disappearance of local names in Argentina (Francés), Mexico (Bancomer), Peru (Continental), and the United States (Compass). Garanti Bank, the Group's franchise in Turkey, changed its name to Garanti BBVA.

In January 2021, BBVA said that it was looking for plans to lower the costs, then in February 2021, it was reported that BBVA was planning to cut around 3,000 jobs in Spain after its net profit fell 48% in the fourth quarter of 2020. In July 2025, BBVA launched cryptocurrency trading and custody services for retail clients in Spain, operating under the EU’s Markets in Crypto-Assets Regulation (MiCA). It was among the first traditional banks in Europe to offer such services. In September 2025, BBVA announced the expansion of its institutional services through the adoption of Ripple’s cryptocurrency custody solution. The initiative is intended to strengthen the bank’s compliance with the European Union’s Markets in Crypto-Assets (MiCA) regulation and broaden its involvement in digital asset markets.

== Credit ratings ==
As of January 2023, BBVA had the following debt ratings with the four major rating agencies:

Rating Agency	Long Term Rating	Short Term Rating
S&P	A (Outlook: Stable)	A-1
Moody's	A3 (Outlook: Stable)	P-2
Fitch	A− (Outlook: Stable)	F-2
DBRS	A (high) (Outlook: Stable)	R-1 (middle)

== International expansion ==
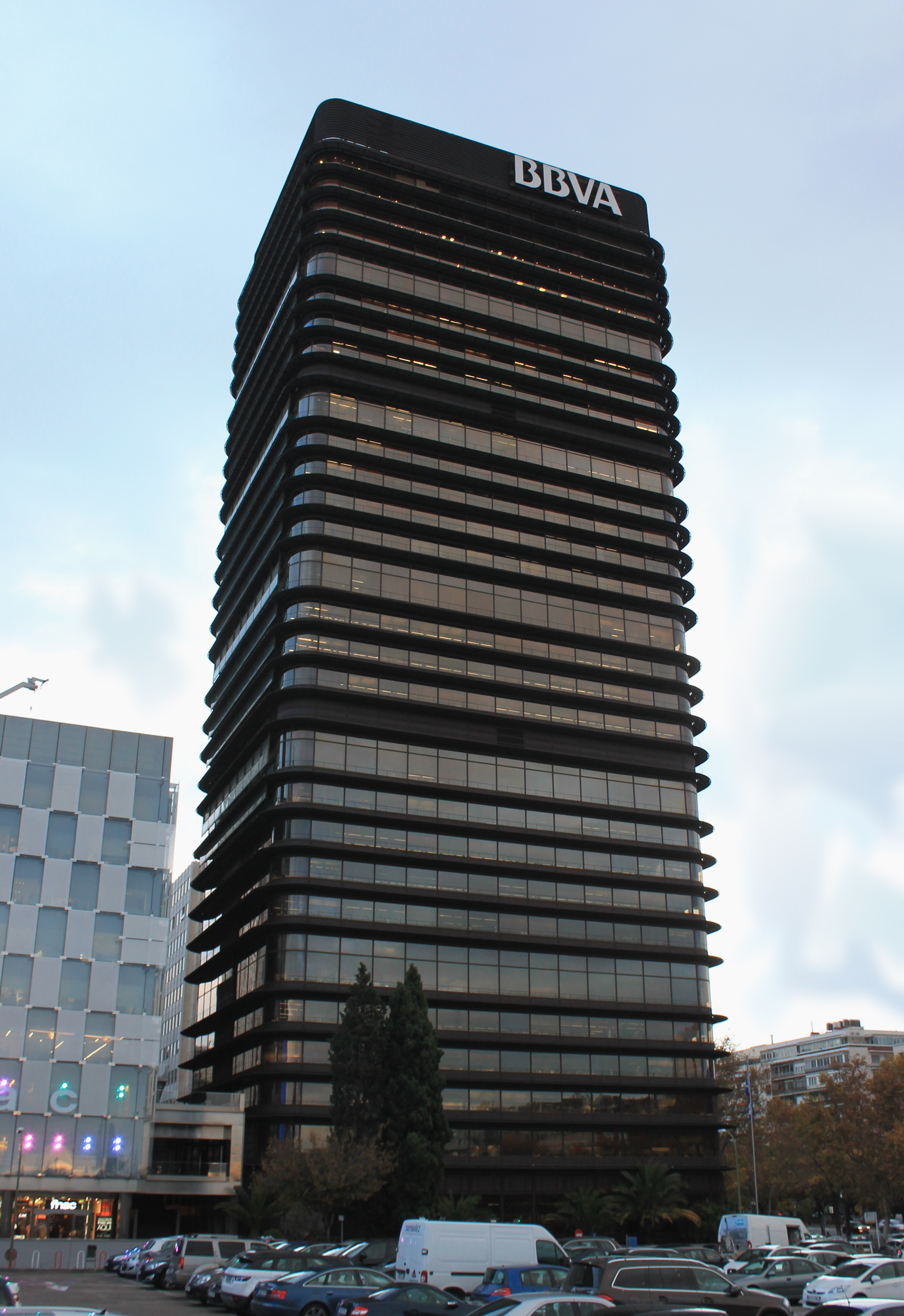
Former offices in Paseo de la Castellana, Madrid

The international presence of BBVA began in 1902, when the Banco de Bilbao opened a branch in Paris and in 1918 another in London, thus becoming the first Spanish bank with a presence abroad. In the 1970s, Banco de Bilbao, Banco de Vizcaya and Banco Exterior were configured as international groups, with the installation of operational and representative offices in the financial capitals of Europe, America and Asia. Likewise, the bank initiated a policy of expansion in America through the purchase of local banks in various countries of the continent.

In 2019, the Bank changed its name to BBVA, dropping local brand names in Argentina (Francés), Mexico (Bancomer), Peru (Continental), and the United States (Compass). In addition to the rebranding, Garanti in Turkey was renamed Garanti BBVA. In February 2025, BBVA seeking an investment partner, hiring Rothschild to sell part of its 75.5% stake in the Crea Madrid Nuevo Norte real estate project. The project, which is expected to be completed by 2035, includes 1.6 million square meters of office space and Spain's tallest skyscraper in its capital.

=== Latin America ===
The Banco de Vizcaya acquired the Commercial Bank of Mayagüez in Puerto Rico in 1979, a bank founded in 1967 by a group of merchants and industrialists. When it became BBVA Puerto Rico, in 1992 it began a growth stage through acquisitions, which gave rise to BBVA Puerto Rico. In 1995, the group entered Peru, with the privatization and subsequent acquisition of Banco Continental, and in Mexico, with the purchase of Probursa, which later merged with BBVA Bancomer to form the financial group BBVA Bancomer that operates in the banking and insurance sector.

In 1996, it entered Colombia with the acquisition of Banco Ganadero, and Argentina with the acquisition of BBVA Francés. It also made new acquisitions in Mexico, buying Banca Cremí and Banco de Oriente. In 1997, BBVA entered Venezuela by acquiring the Provincial Bank, which had been founded in 1953. It also expanded its presence in Argentina with the acquisition of Banco de Credito Argentino. It also entered into the pension funds business in Bolivia, founding BBVA Previsión AFP. In 1998, the bank entered Chile after buying Banco BHIF, and AFP Provida one year later. It also entered Brazil with the purchase of Banco Excel-Econômico; and in Argentina, BBVA bought the insurer Consolidar, created in 1994.

In 2000, the merger of BBV Probursa with Bancomer occurred in Mexico to create BBVA Bancomer, the largest bank in the country by volume of assets. At the beginning of 2004, the Group announced the takeover bid for 100% of the shares of Bancomer that did not yet belong to BBVA, buying all the shares of the Mexican bank. In 2004 it acquired 100% of Hipotecaria Nacional, a private entity specialized in the mortgage business. In 2001, the implementation of the unified platform for all businesses and all countries was completed, and the BBVA brand was installed in the Group's entities in Latin America.

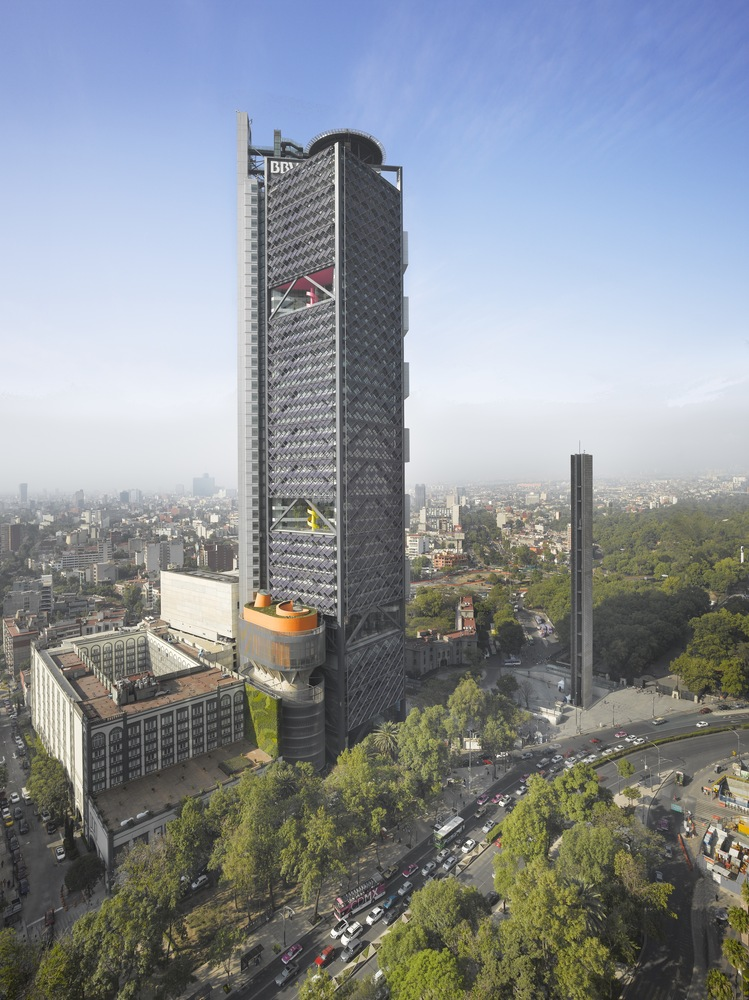
Headquarters of BBVA México in Mexico City

In 2004, the banks of Chile (BHIF) and Colombia (Banco Ganadero) changed their commercial denomination and were simply called BBVA. In 2006, through a public auction, it acquired the old savings and housing corporation, Banco Granahorrar de Colombia, whose shares belonged to the Grancolombian group, and with the financial and economic crisis of the late 1990s, it passed into the hands of the state through Fogafin. Later, it merged with BBVA Colombia, creating one of the largest banking groups in the country. In 2017, BBVA acquired the Mexican company Openpay, a startup fintech specializing in online payments. As of 6 July 2018, Scotiabank Chile assumed control of BBVA Chile, with which the legal trademark would be renamed Scotiabank Azul until its full integration with Scotiabank. The total change was made in October 2018.

Historical research has emphasised that the success of BBVA's expansion in Latin America depended not only on acquisitions but also on the integration of management practices and the way it deployed information technology across the region.

=== United States ===
In 2004, the Group began another line of international expansion with entry into the US market, with acquisitions of entities in the south of the country (Sunbelt region), taking advantage of the strength of its Mexican subsidiary BBVA Bancomer. In the second quarter of the year, the Group announced the purchase of Valley Bank in California through BBVA Bancomer. In 2005, it bought the Banco Laredo (located in Texas), and in 2006 the Texas Regional Bancshares (Texas State Bank). In 2007, BBVA acquired Alabama Compass Bank in the US, strengthening its franchise in that country. Later, BBVA unified its corporate image in the country by reorganizing its entire portfolio of brands under the name "BBVA Compass".

In 2009, BBVA acquired the Guaranty Bank in Texas, following the collapse of this entity. In 2014, BBVA acquired the US digital banking company Simple for 117 million dollars. In its push towards a digital future in 2015 acquired the California company Spring Studio, specializing in user experience and digital design. By 2018, BBVA USA was one of the 30 largest banks in the US. In 2020, BBVA USA was sold to PNC Financial Services for US$11.6 billion.

=== Turkey ===
In 2010, the Group acquired 24.9% of the capital of Turkiye Garanti Bankasi AS, the second largest bank in Turkey, and reached an agreement with the Dogus Group — the reference shareholder of Garanti — to manage the entity jointly. Subsequently, this participation increased to 25.01%. In November 2014, BBVA acquired an additional 14.89% of the Garanti bank from Dogus Holdings for €1.988 billion, bringing its share to 39.9% of the entity. In February 2017, it reached a new purchase agreement with Dogus to acquire 9.95% more from Garanti bank for €859 million, increasing its participation to 49.85%. On 15 November 2021, BBVA offered to purchase the remaining 50.15% of shares in Garanti bank. In May 2022, BBVA reached a 86% stake in Garanti BBVA.

== Other European operations ==
=== Italy and Germany ===
In a shift from its traditional branch-based model, BBVA entered the Italian and German retail banking markets with fully digital, standalone neobank platforms. BBVA launched its digital bank in Italy in 2021. Rather than opening physical branches, the bank focused on a lean cost structure, offering free accounts, high-yield deposits, and a robust mobile application. Within four years, the Italian digital branch surpassed 700,000 customers. Following its launch in Italy, BBVA launched a similar digital bank in Germany in June 2025. While the German operation is completely branchless, it partnered with local networks to provide customers access to over 70,000 physical contact points for cash deposits and withdrawals.

=== Portugal ===
In Portugal, BBVA operates a traditional universal banking model serving both individual retail clients and corporate entities. While the Portuguese division maintains a physical branch network in major cities, it heavily emphasizes a digital-first approach.

=== Romania ===
BBVA's presence in Romania has historically been managed through its subsidiary, Garanti BBVA Romania (operated via its Turkish subsidiary, Garanti BBVA). However, on March 28, 2026, Raiffeisen Bank International announced an agreement to acquire 100% of the shares in Garanti BBVA Group Romania for approximately €591 million.

== Corporate social responsibility ==
In 1932, the Economic Research Department was created to disseminate knowledge of financial matters among society. In May 2010, BBVA created BBVA Research, a platform that merges the Economic Research Department with the Global Market unit. In 1988, the BBVA Foundation was created to support and promote scientific research and cultural creation, the dissemination of culture and knowledge, and the recognition of talent through various awards, grants and scholarships.

In 2007, BBVA set up the Microfinance Foundation in Latin America, a non-profit organization created with the aim of promoting the sustainable development of entrepreneurs in vulnerable situations. In 2021, the Organization for Economic Cooperation and Development (OECD) recognized the BBVA Microfinance Foundation as the first to contribute to development in Latin America and the first in the world to contribute to gender equality. In March 2022, in line with the European Commission and OECD's framework for financial competence for adults in the European Union, BBVA implements a plan to promote financial education programs aimed at improving the financial inclusion and health of one million people and promoting sustainable development and investment.

== Sustainability ==
BBVA's link to sustainability and sustainable finance began in 2007, when it became one of the banks to participate in the first green bond issued by the EIB. In 2021, BBVA joined, as one of the 43 founding members, the "Net-Zero Banking Alliance" initiative, promoted by the United Nations to encourage banks' lending and investment portfolios to be net zero in greenhouse gas emissions by 2050. In March 2022, BBVA invested 18.5 million euros in "LowerCarbon", a venture capital fund specializing in financing projects and companies focused on climate change. In July 2022, BBVA joined the "Carbonplace" platform as a founder with the aim of facilitating access to carbon credits for individuals and companies. In 2023, the Dow Jones Sustainability Index (DJSI) awarded BBVA the highest score in the banking category in the European region for the fourth consecutive year.

== Presence on stock market indexes ==
=== IBEX 35 ===
BBVA is included in the IBEX 35, the official index of the Spanish Continuous Market composed of the 35 most liquid stocks traded on continuous market. The BBVA has a market capitalization of 15,816 million euros, (09-30-20).

=== Eurostoxx 50 ===
BBVA bank lists in Eurostoxx 50 along with other banks like Santander Bank and Deutsche Bank.

=== NYSE ===
BBVA bank is listed on the New York Stock Exchange.

=== Mexican Stock Exchange ===
BBVA bank is listed on the Mexican Stock Exchange.

== Emerging and growth-leading economies (EAGLEs) ==
Emerging and growth-leading economies (EAGLEs) are a grouping of key emerging markets developed by BBVA Research. The EAGLE economies are expected to lead global growth in the next 10 years, and to provide important opportunities for investors.

== See also ==
- BBVA Foundation Frontiers of Knowledge Award – annual science and humanities award since 2009
- BBVA Rising Stars Challenge – NBA exhibition basketball game
- List of banks in the euro area
- List of banks in Spain
