= Stephanie Brock =

American chemist

- Alma mater: University of Washington; University of California, Davis
- Awards: Fellow of the American Association for the Advancement of Science (2012); Fellow of the American Chemical Society (2014)
- Website: Brock Research Group
- Academic career
- Institutions: University of Connecticut (1995–1999); Wayne State University (1999–)
- Thesis: Synthesis and structure-property relationships of layered pnictide and pnictide oxide compounds of manganese and zinc
- Doctoral advisor: Susan M. Kauzlarich

Stephanie Lee Brock is an American chemist who is professor of inorganic chemistry at Wayne State University. Her research considers transition metal pnictides and chalcogenide nanomaterials. She is a Fellow of the American Association for the Advancement of Science and the American Chemical Society.

== Early life and education ==
Brock completed her undergraduate degree in chemistry at the University of Washington. She was a graduate student at the University of California, Davis, where she investigated structure-property relationships in pnictide oxide compounds under the supervision of Susan M. Kauzlarich. During her doctorate she made use of powder diffraction and magnetic susceptibility measurements. Brock was a postdoctoral research associate at the University of Connecticut where she worked with Steven Suib on the use of manganese oxide nanocrystalline materials.

== Research and career ==
In 1999, Brock joined Wayne State University as an assistant professor in the department of chemistry and was promoted to full professor in 2009. Her research considers pnictide, pnictide oxides and chalcogenides. In particular, Brock is interested in the controlled growth of functional nanoparticles and nanostructures. She demonstrated that manganese arsenide nanoparticles have magnetic properties that depend on their dopant concentration, and offer hope for magnetic refrigeration.

Brock has also realised sol–gel processes that allow the formation of functional chalcogenide self-assemblies. The gel-like cadmium selenide (CdSe) and zinc sulfide (ZnS) nanoparticles are akin to a cross-linked polymer network, and can be supercritically dried to form porous aerogels. The aerogels have high surface areas and form a conductive network with the optical properties of the nanoparticles themselves.

Brock is responsible for the development of electron microscopy at Wayne State University. She serves as Deputy Editor of the American Chemical Society journal ACS Materials.

== Awards and honors ==
- 2001 National Science Foundation CAREER Award
- 2014 Elected Fellow of the American Chemical Society
- 2012 Elected Fellow of the American Association for the Advancement of Science
- 2013 Wayne State University Gershenson Distinguished Faculty Fellowship Award
- 2019 Wayne State University Outstanding Graduate Mentor Award
- 2020 Inducted into the Wayne State University Academy of Scholars

== Selected publications ==
- Jaya L Mohanan; Indika U Arachchige; Stephanie L Brock (1 January 2005). "Porous semiconductor chalcogenide aerogels". Science. 307 (5708): 397–400. doi:10.1126/SCIENCE.1104226. ISSN 0036-8075. PMID 15662006. Wikidata Q95818192.
- Da Li; Habib Baydoun; Cláudio N Verani; Stephanie L Brock (22 March 2016). "Efficient Water Oxidation Using CoMnP Nanoparticles". Journal of the American Chemical Society. 138 (12): 4006–4009. doi:10.1021/JACS.6B01543. ISSN 0002-7863. PMID 26972408. Wikidata Q95561817.
- Ye-Zi You; Kennedy K. Kalebaila; Stephanie L. Brock; David Oupický (May 2008). "Temperature-Controlled Uptake and Release in PNIPAM-Modified Porous Silica Nanoparticles". Chemistry of Materials. 20 (10): 3354–3359. doi:10.1021/CM703363W. ISSN 0897-4756. Wikidata Q57359847.
