= Paul Brock (journalist) =

American journalist and film producer

Paul Brock was an American journalist and film producer.

== Biography ==
=== Early life and education ===
Brock was born on 10 February 1932. He was educated at Armstrong High School. Later, he studied at Howard University.

=== Career ===
In 1951, Brock joined the U.S. Air Force as a radio reporter and later became the editor of a newspaper at Griffiss Air Force Base.

In 1968, Brock became news director at WETA-FM and started to host a news program named The Potter's House. Three years later, in 1971, he joined WUHR-FM, a Howard University radio station, as news director.

In 1975, Brock became the chief organizer of the National Association of Black Journalists after founding it.

Brock was also a fellow of the Institute for the Study of Educational Policy of Howard University.
