= Rovenia M. Brock =

American businesswoman

Dr. Rovenia M. Brock, also known as Dr. Ro, is an American nutritionist, lecturer, health reporter, entrepreneur, and author.

== Career ==
Brock made her television debut as host of BET's Heart and Soul. She worked as a nutrition coach on The View, helping co-host Sherri Shepherd lose 41 pounds. She is currently a nutritional adviser on The Dr. Oz Show.

Brock partnered with McDonald's in 2005, to promote physical activity.

=== Radio and podcast work ===
Brock is nutrition contributor to National Public Radio (NPR).

She launched a podcast, Dr. Ro on Demand, in 2019.

=== Home video ===
Brock was executive producer, creator and host of Dr. Ro's Fit Kidz, a health and fitness children's DVD series. l

== Works ==
- Dr. Ro’s Ten Secrets To Livin’ Healthy (2004) ISBN 9780307483980
- Lose Your Final 15: Dr. Ro's Plan to Eat 15 Servings A Day & Lose 15 Pounds at a Time (2016) ISBN 1623368022
