= George Brock =

George Brock may refer to:

- George F. Brock (1872–1914), Medal of Honor recipient
- George Brock (footballer) (1919–1941), Australian rules footballer
- George Brock (athlete) (1888–1956), Canadian track and field athlete
- George Brock (journalist) (born 1951), head of the department of journalism at City University London
- Big George Brock (1932–2020), American blues musician from St Louis, Missouri
