= Eric Brock (American football coach) =

American football coach

Coaching career (HC unless noted)
- 2002–2009: Haskell Indian Nations

Head coaching record
- Overall: 22–60

Eric "Gus" Brock is an American football coach. Brock was the head football coach for the Haskell Indian Nations University in Lawrence, Kansas for eight seasons, from 2002 until 2009. His coaching record at Haskell Indian Nations was 22–60.
