= Robert Brock =

Robert Brock may refer to:

- Robert L. Brock (1924–1998), American businessman best known for founding ShowBiz Pizza Place
- Robert K. Brock (1878–1962), American politician in the Virginia Senate
