= Lou Brock (disambiguation) =

Lou Brock (1939–2020) was an American professional baseball player.

Lou Brock may also refer to:

- Lou Brock (producer) (1892–1971), American film producer
- Lou Brock (American football) (1917–1989), American football all-purpose back in the 1940s
- Lou Brock Jr. (born 1964), American football defensive back in the 1980s
