= Mel Brock =

Mel Brock may refer to:

- Mel Brock (runner) (1888–1956), Canadian sprinter and middle-distance runner
- Mel Brock (footballer) (1916–2000), Australian rules footballer
