= General Brock (wreck, 1846) =

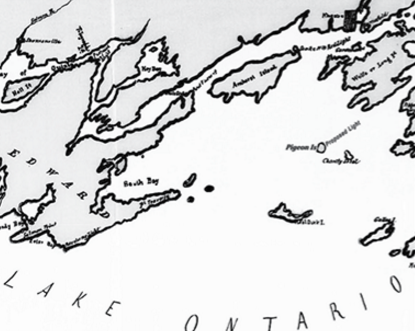
Pigeon Island, where the vessel ran aground, is in the NE quadrant of this map.

The General Brock was a sailing brig that ran aground on November 26, 1846, on Pigeon Island, Lake Ontario, in Canada. Her crew were rescued by officials from the nearby naval base at Kingston, Ontario.

The wreck of the General Brock was one of the triggers for the construction of a lighthouse on the island, in 1870.
