= Frederick Brock =

Frederick Brock may refer to:

- Frederic Brock (1854–1929), English naval officer
- Frederick Brock (footballer) (1901–?), English footballer
- Frederick W. Brock (1899–1972), Swiss optometrist

== See also ==
- Fred Brock (born 1974), American football player
