= Kadar Brock =

American artist (born 1980)

Kadar Brock (born May 20, 1980) is an American artist living and working in Brooklyn, New York. He received his BFA from Cooper Union School of Art in New York City in 2002. His abstract paintings explore history, personal psychology, materials and surface.

== Artwork ==
Brock creates paintings through a repeated system of painting, sanding, priming and scraping on the surfaces of canvases. A canvas is "painted on, dried, un-stretched, scraped with a razor blade, primed over, sanded, re-stretched, and painted on again."

This labor-intensive processes maps the artwork's history of production. He repeats these processes until the layers of paint "stop functioning as pictures and evolve into a historical object."==Reviews and reception==

Marina Cashdan, in Artsy wrote: "His studio is an ecosystem—and an efficient one—in which the artist’s methodical and ritualistic process makes for a consistent upcycling of materials across the space: when he spray-paints, he uses a canvas as the drop cloth; that canvas becomes the start of a painting; and that painting has two fates: one sliding door is going under the razor and the industrial sander, before being coated with layers of pigments and primed, sanded, and primed, a process repeated until the desired effect is reached; the other fate is to be martyred into chips or dust.

Stephan Cox, in Hunted Projects: In Dialogue wrote: "What’s fascinating is that Brock’s works are the product of an artist who aims to demystify the gesture in painting through creating rituals that in effect eradicate the didactic artist-viewer scenario. Brock doesn’t aim to create works that are easily read as being a by-product of an artist’s expression; Brock has created a set of rituals, a rolling of dice, where he, in effect has his actions directed for him. This could be through the number of brush strokes to apply or the number of cuts to make, in all, his intuitive approach to painting is not present or discernible to the viewer."
