= Eugene Brock =

American politician (1853–1911)

Member of the Washington House of Representatives for the 23rd district
- In office 1891–1895

Personal details
- Born: May 6, 1853 Newbury, Vermont, United States
- Died: December 24, 1911 (aged 58) Stella, Washington, United States
- Party: Republican

Eugene Brock (May 6, 1853 – December 24, 1911) was an American politician in the state of Washington. He served in the Washington House of Representatives from 1891 to 1895.
