= Roby Brock =

American journalist

Roby Brock is an American media executive, journalist, and political reporter in Arkansas. He hosts a television show and radio show and is CEO of a media company.

His show Talk Business and Politics (TB&P) aired on Fox affiliate KLRT-TV. Guests have included Rex Nelson. Brock has written for Arkansas Democrat-Gazette and Arkansas Business.

== Education ==
Brock graduated from Hendrix College in 1988.

== Career ==
Brock worked on Bill Clinton's 1992 presidential campaign. He also worked for Arkansas governor Jim Guy Tucker. Brock was the initial director of Arkansas' State Election Commission and ran for a state senate seat.

Brock is CEO of Natural State Media the parent company for Talk Business & Politics and The Northwest Arkansas Business Journal. He founded River Rock Communications, the firm that produces his show and documentaries. He hosts and executive produces Talk Business & Politics a multi-media news organization covering business and politics in Arkansas. Brock also moderates radio programs on Arkansas NPR affiliates and daily digital newscasts at the TalkBusiness.net website.

== Dispute with Arkansas governor Mike Huckabee ==
In 2003, Brock reached a settlement with Mike Huckabee and the Arkansas Educational Television Network after Brock filed a lawsuit alleging that the defendants had conspired to remove his television program from the air.
