= Ludvig Frederik Brock =

Norwegian military officer

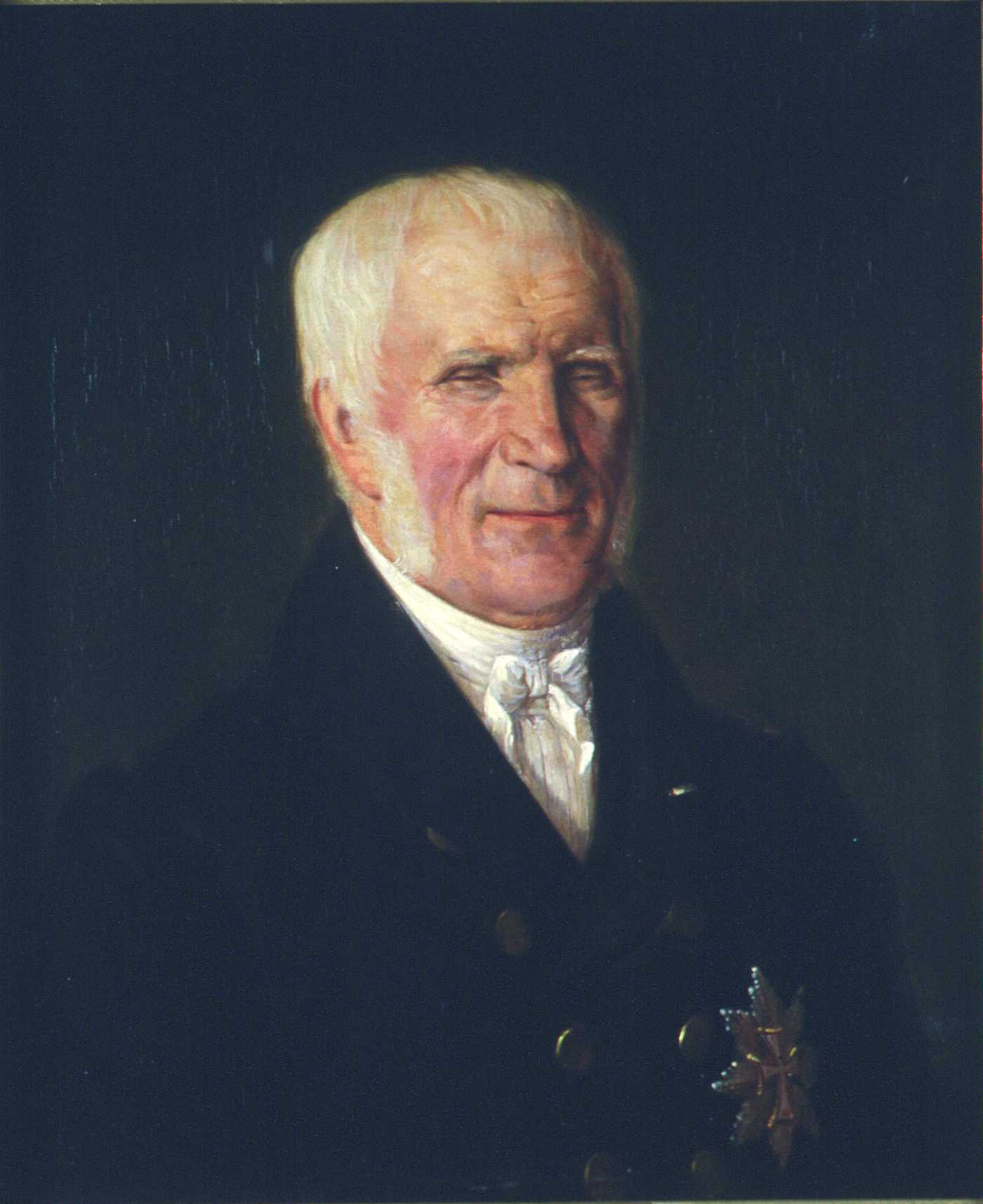
Ludvig Frederik Brock

Ludvig Frederik Brock (20 August 1774 – 22 November 1853) was a Norwegian army officer.
