= Greg Brock =

Greg Brock may refer to:

- Greg Brock (baseball) (born 1957), American baseball player
- Greg Brock (The West Wing), a fictional character on The West Wing
- Greg Brock (runner) (born 1948), American long-distance runner, 1968 All-American for the Stanford Cardinal track and field team
