= Thomas Brock (disambiguation) =

Thomas Brock (1847–1922) was an English sculptor.

Thomas Brock may also refer to:

- Thomas D. Brock (1926–2021), American microbiologist
- Tom Brock (singer) (1942–2002), American soul singer
- Thomas Brock (opperhoved) (died 1745), Chief of the Danish Gold Coast
- Tom Brock (cricketer) (born 1994), English cricketer
- Tom Brock (historian), Australian sports historian, see Tom Brock Lecture
