= Isaac Brock (disambiguation) =

Isaac Brock (1769–1812) was a British army officer.

Isaac Brock may also refer to:

- Isaac Brock (musician) (born 1975), American musician
- Isaac Brock (longevity claimant) (1787–1909), American longevity claimant
