= Kristy Brock =

American radiologist

Kristy Brock is a professor in the Department of Imaging Physics, Division of Diagnostic Imaging and is an adjunct professor in the Department of Radiation Physics, Division of Radiation Oncology at the University of Texas MD Anderson Cancer Center, Houston.

== Education ==
Brock earned a B.S. in 1999, M.S. in 2000, and Ph.D. in 2003 in Nuclear Engineering and Radiological Sciences from the University of Michigan, Ann Arbor.

== Career ==
Brock was an associate professor at the University Health Network in Toronto from 2003 to 2012. In 2012 she returned to her alma mater, the University of Michigan, as an associate and adjunct professor. Her positions were adjunct professor, Nuclear Engineering and Radiological Sciences, associate professor, Radiation Oncology, and associate professor, Biomedical Engineering. She was in this position from 2012 to 2016. After four years there Brock transitioned to a tenured professor position at the MD Anderson Cancer Center in Houston.

== Publications ==
Brock edited and wrote a book that was published in 2013 entitled Image Processing in Radiation Therapy.
