= William Brock (historian) =

British historian (1916 – 2014)

William Ranulf Brock, FBA (16 May 1916 – 12 November 2014) was a British historian of the United States.

Brock was educated at Christ's Hospital and Trinity College, Cambridge, where he won the Thirlwall Prize. He was Professor of Modern History at the University of Glasgow from 1967 to 1981, and life fellow of Selwyn College, Cambridge, from 1947 to 2014. He was elected a fellow of the British Academy in 1990.

== Publications ==
- Lord Liverpool and Liberal Toryism 1820 to 1827 (Cambridge: Cambridge University Press, 1941; 2nd edn, Hamden, CT: Archon, 1967)
- Britain and the Dominions (Cambridge: Cambridge University Press, 1951)
- The Effect of the Loss of the
- American Colonies upon British Policy (London: Historical Association, 1957; 2nd edn, 1966)
- The Character of American History, Aids for Teachers, vol. 3 (London: Macmillan, 1960; 2nd edn, 1965)
- An American Crisis: Congress and Reconstruction, 1865–1867 (New York: St Martin's Press, 1963)
- The Evolution of American Democracy (New York: Dial Press, 1970)
- Conflict and Transformation in the U.S., 1844-1877 (Baltimore, MD: Penguin, 1973)
- The United States, 1789-1890: Sources of History (Ithaca, NY: Cornell University Press, 1975)
- Parties and Political Conscience (Millwood, NY: KTO Press, 1979)
- Scotus Americanus: A Survey of the Sources for Links Between Scotland and America in the Eighteenth Century (Edinburgh: Edinburgh University Press, 1981)
- Investigation and Responsibility: Public Responsibility in the United States, 1865–1900 (Cambridge: Cambridge University Press, 1984)
- Welfare, Democracy, and the New Deal (Cambridge: Cambridge University Press, 1988)
- (with P. M. H. Cooper) Selwyn College: A History (Durham: Pentland Press, 1994)
