= Susan M. Kauzlarich =

American chemist

- Born: Worcester, Massachusetts
- Education: College of William and Mary, Michigan State University
- Known for: Solid-state chemistry, Materials chemistry, Nanoscience, Zintl phases, Thermoelectric materials
- Awards: Fellow of the American Association for the Advancement of Science, Fellow of the American Chemical Society, Presidential Award for Excellence in Science, Mathematics, and Engineering Mentoring, IUPAC Distinguished Women in Chemistry/Chemical Engineering
- Scientific career
- Fields: Chemistry
- Workplaces: University of California, Davis
- Academic advisors: Bruce A. Averill, John D. Corbett
- Doctoral students: Julia Chan, Stephanie Brock

Susan M. Kauzlarich is an American chemist who researches and characterizes the synthesis and characterization of Zintl phases and nanoclusters with applications in the fields of thermoelectric materials, magnetic resonance imaging, energy storage, opto-electronics, and drug delivery.

Kauzlarich is a distinguished professor of chemistry at the University of California, Davis (UC Davis). Kauzlarich has published over 250 peer-reviewed publications and has been awarded several patents. In 2009, Kauzlarich received the annual Presidential Award for Excellence in Science, Mathematics and Engineering Mentoring, which is administered by the National Science Foundation to acknowledge faculty members who raise the membership of minorities, women and disabled students in the science and engineering fields.

== Education, career, and service ==
Kauzlarich received a Bachelor of Science in chemistry from the College of William & Mary in 1980. Although originally planning to become a high school chemistry teacher, her collegiate mentors encouraged her to pursue graduate studies in chemistry. She did her graduate studies with Bruce A. Averill at Michigan State University, receiving a chemistry PhD in 1985. Her graduate work research encompassed the synthesis, development, and study of low-dimensional conducting materials derived from the layered material FeOCl. Her characterization methods of these new materials included x-ray absorption spectroscopy and neutron diffraction. From 1985 to 1987, Kauzlarich was a postdoctoral fellow with John Corbett at Iowa State University where she explored the synthesis and bonding characteristics of novel extended condensed metal chain compounds built on [R_{6}6I_{12}Z] (R=Ln, Y, Sc; Z=B,C,N, C_{2}) clusters.

Kauzlarich joined the department of Chemistry at the University of California, Davis in 1987. She was promoted to associate professor in 1992, promoted to full professor in 1996, and in 2014, distinguished professor. She was the Maria Goeppert Mayer Distinguished Scholar at Argonne National Laboratory from 1997 to 1998, faculty assistant to the Dean of Mathematical and Physical Sciences from 2010 to 2013, and chair of the chemistry department from 2013 to 2016.

Kauzlarich served as an associate editor for the journal Chemistry of Materials from 2006 to 2021 and is a deputy editor for Science Advances (2022-). She has been a member of the editorial advisory board for the handbook Physics and Chemistry of the Rare Earths since 2002. She was an associate editor for the Journal of Solid State Chemistry from 2000 to 2005, and as a member of the advisory review board of the Research Corporation for Science Advancement from 2004 to 2010. Kauzlarich is the editor of the book Chemistry, structure, and bonding of Zintl phases and ions.

Kauzlarich is an advocate for diversity in the chemistry community and is known for her personal commitment to mentorship. Throughout her career she has built and continues to support a pipeline of women and underrepresented students in the field of chemistry from high school through graduate study. During her career, Kauzlarich's mentorship strategies have expanded to support a culture shift in the community through discussions, workshops, and development of new initiatives. One of her initiatives has been the development of the American Chemical Society Summer Educational Experience for the Economically Disadvantaged Program (SEED) program which she established at UC Davis in 1988. For her mentorship of students, Kauzlarich was recognized by Barack Obama with the 2009 Presidential Award for Excellence in Science, Mathematics, and Engineering Mentoring. At UC Davis, she serves as committee member for the Center for the Advancement of Multicultural Perspectives on Science, part of the UC Davis "ADVANCE" initiative. She is also an active member of the steering committees at UC Davis including the Women's Research and Resource Center and Women in Science and Engineering.

== Research and notable publications ==
Kauzlarich's research focuses on synthesis and characterization of novel solid state materials. Some of Kauzlarich's publications from her independent research career are listed below:

- Hu, Yufei; Chen, Chih-Wei; Cao, Huibo; Makhmudov, F.; Grebenkemper, Jason H.; Abdusalyamova, M. N.; Morosan, Emilia; Kauzlarich, Susan M. (September 28, 2016). "Tuning Magnetism of [MnSb4]9– Cluster in Yb14MnSb11 through Chemical Substitutions on Yb Sites: Appearance and Disappearance of Spin Reorientation". Journal of the American Chemical Society. 138 (38): 12422–12431. Bibcode:2016JAChS.13812422H. doi:10.1021/jacs.6b05636. ISSN 0002-7863. PMID 27556742.
- Kazem, Nasrin; Zaikina, Julia V.; Ohno, Saneyuki; Snyder, G. Jeffrey; Kauzlarich, Susan M. (November 10, 2015). "Coinage-Metal-Stuffed Eu9Cd4Sb9: Metallic Compounds with Anomalous Low Thermal Conductivities" (PDF). Chemistry of Materials. 27 (21): 7508–7519. doi:10.1021/acs.chemmater.5b03808. ISSN 0897-4756.
- Fleurial, Jean-Pierre; G. Snyder, Jeffrey; Kauzlarich, Susan; Uhl, David; Janka, Oliver; Zevalkink, Alexandra; K. Bux, Sabah (2014). "Glass-like lattice thermal conductivity and high thermoelectric efficiency in Yb 9 Mn 4.2 Sb 9" (PDF). Journal of Materials Chemistry A. 2 (1): 215–220. doi:10.1039/C3TA14021K.
- Cox, Catherine A.; Toberer, Eric S.; Levchenko, Andrey A.; Brown, Shawna R.; Snyder, G. Jeffrey; Navrotsky, Alexandra; Kauzlarich, Susan M. (April 14, 2009). "Structure, Heat Capacity, and High-Temperature Thermal Properties of Yb14Mn1−xAlxSb11" (PDF). Chemistry of Materials. 21 (7): 1354–1360. doi:10.1021/cm803252r. ISSN 0897-4756.
- Goforth, Andrea M.; Klavins, Peter; Fettinger, James C.; Kauzlarich, Susan M. (December 1, 2008). "Magnetic Properties and Negative Colossal Magnetoresistance of the Rare Earth Zintl phase EuIn2As2". Inorganic Chemistry. 47 (23): 11048–11056. doi:10.1021/ic801290u. ISSN 0020-1669. PMID 18959371.
- Toberer, Eric S.; Cox, Catherine A.; Brown, Shawna R.; Ikeda, Teruyuki; May, Andrew F.; Kauzlarich, Susan M.; Snyder, G. Jeffrey (2008). "Traversing the Metal-Insulator Transition in a Zintl Phase: Rational Enhancement of Thermoelectric Efficiency in Yb14Mn1−xAlxSb11". Advanced Functional Materials. 18 (18): 2795–2800. doi:10.1002/adfm.200800298. ISSN 1616-3028. S2CID 137266967.
- Brown, Shawna R.; Toberer, Eric S.; Ikeda, Teruyuki; Cox, Catherine A.; Gascoin, Franck; Kauzlarich, Susan M.; Snyder, G. Jeffrey (May 1, 2008). "Improved Thermoelectric Performance in Yb14Mn1−xZnxSb11 by the Reduction of Spin-Disorder Scattering" (PDF). Chemistry of Materials. 20 (10): 3412–3419. doi:10.1021/cm703616q. ISSN 0897-4756.
- Toberer, Eric S.; Brown, Shawna R.; Ikeda, Teruyuki; Kauzlarich, Susan M.; Jeffrey Snyder, G. (August 11, 2008). "High thermoelectric efficiency in lanthanum doped Yb14MnSb11" (PDF). Applied Physics Letters. 93 (6): 062110. Bibcode:2008ApPhL..93f2110T. doi:10.1063/1.2970089. ISSN 0003-6951.
- Brown, Shawna R.; Kauzlarich, Susan M.; Gascoin, Franck; Snyder, G. Jeffrey (April 1, 2006). "Yb14MnSb11: New High Efficiency Thermoelectric Material for Power Generation". Chemistry of Materials. 18 (7): 1873–1877. doi:10.1021/cm060261t. ISSN 0897-4756.
- Kauzlarich, Susan M.; Brown, Shawna R.; Jeffrey Snyder, G. (2007). "Zintl phases for thermoelectric devices" (PDF). Dalton Transactions (21): 2099–107. doi:10.1039/b702266b. ISSN 1477-9226. PMID 17514328.
- Chan, Julia Y.; Olmstead, Marilyn M.; Kauzlarich, Susan M.; Webb, David J. (November 1, 1998). "Structure and Ferromagnetism of the Rare-Earth Zintl Compounds: Yb14MnSb11 and Yb14MnBi11". Chemistry of Materials. 10 (11): 3583–3588. doi:10.1021/cm980358i. ISSN 0897-4756.

Kauzlarich has also been known for research on the preparation of colloidal nanoclusters and most particularly the preparation of challenging to access Group IV derivatives. These materials hold promise in the areas of biomedicine alongside, importantly, next-generation devices with novel optical and transport properties. Listed below are some of her research team's publications in this research area to-date:

- Bernard, Andrew; Zhang, Keye; Larson, Daniel; Tabatabaei, Katayoon; Kauzlarich, Susan M. (May 7, 2018). "Solvent Effects on Growth, Crystallinity, and Surface Bonding of Ge Nanoparticles". Inorganic Chemistry. 57 (9): 5299–5306. doi:10.1021/acs.inorgchem.8b00334. ISSN 0020-1669. PMID 29671319.
- Tabatabaei, Katayoun; Lu, Haipeng; Nolan, Bradley M.; Cen, Xi; McCold, Cliff E.; Zhang, Xinming; Brutchey, Richard L.; van Benthem, Klaus; Hihath, Joshua (September 12, 2017). "Bismuth Doping of Germanium Nanocrystals through Colloidal Chemistry". Chemistry of Materials. 29 (17): 7353–7363. doi:10.1021/acs.chemmater.7b02241. ISSN 0897-4756.
- Nolan, Bradley M.; Chan, Eric K.; Zhang, Xinming; Muthuswamy, Elayaraja; van Benthem, Klaus; Kauzlarich, Susan M. (May 24, 2016). "Sacrificial Silver Nanoparticles: Reducing GeI2 To Form Hollow Germanium Nanoparticles by Electroless Deposition". ACS Nano. 10 (5): 5391–5397. doi:10.1021/acsnano.6b01604. ISSN 1936-0851. PMID 27096547.
- Zuilhof, Han; Kauzlarich, Susan M.; Veinot, Jonathan G. C.; Fink, Mark J.; Marcelis, Antonius T. M.; Alink, Gerrit M.; Mitchell, Brian S.; Clark, Rhett J.; Shukaliak, Amber (May 16, 2013). "Cytotoxicity of surface-functionalized silicon and germanium nanoparticles: the dominant role of surface charges". Nanoscale. 5 (11): 4870–4883. Bibcode:2013Nanos...5.4870B. doi:10.1039/C3NR34266B. ISSN 2040-3372. PMC 3667208. PMID 23619571.
- Muthuswamy, Elayaraja; Iskandar, Andrew S.; Amador, Marlene M.; Kauzlarich, Susan M. (April 23, 2013). "Facile Synthesis of Germanium Nanoparticles with Size Control: Microwave versus Conventional Heating". Chemistry of Materials. 25 (8): 1416–1422. doi:10.1021/cm302229b. ISSN 0897-4756.
- Atkins, Tonya M.; Cassidy, Maja C.; Lee, Menyoung; Ganguly, Shreyashi; Marcus, Charles M.; Kauzlarich, Susan M. (February 26, 2013). "Synthesis of Long T1 Silicon Nanoparticles for Hyperpolarized 29Si Magnetic Resonance Imaging". ACS Nano. 7 (2): 1609–1617. doi:10.1021/nn305462y. ISSN 1936-0851. PMC 3612549. PMID 23350651.
- Tu, Chuqiao; Ma, Xuchu; House, Adrian; Kauzlarich, Susan M.; Louie, Angelique Y. (April 14, 2011). "PET Imaging and Biodistribution of Silicon Quantum Dots in Mice". ACS Medicinal Chemistry Letters. 2 (4): 285–288. doi:10.1021/ml1002844. PMC 3086380. PMID 21546997.
- Tu, Chuqiao; Ma, Xuchu; Pantazis, Periklis; Kauzlarich, Susan M.; Louie, Angelique Y. (February 17, 2010). "Paramagnetic, Silicon Quantum Dots for Magnetic Resonance and Two-Photon Imaging of Macrophages". Journal of the American Chemical Society. 132 (6): 2016–2023. Bibcode:2010JAChS.132.2016T. doi:10.1021/ja909303g. ISSN 0002-7863. PMC 2836323. PMID 20092250.
- Zou, Jing; Baldwin, Richard K.; Pettigrew, Katherine A.; Kauzlarich, Susan M. (2004). "Solution Synthesis of Ultrastable Luminescent Siloxane-Coated Silicon Nanoparticles". Nano Letters. 4 (7): 1181–1186. Bibcode:2004NanoL...4.1181Z. doi:10.1021/nl0497373. ISSN 1530-6984.
- Yang, Chung-Sung; Bley, Richard A.; Kauzlarich, Susan M.; Lee, Howard W. H.; Delgado, Gildardo R. (1999). "Synthesis of Alkyl-Terminated Silicon Nanoclusters by a Solution Route". Journal of the American Chemical Society. 121 (22): 5191–5195. Bibcode:1999JAChS.121.5191Y. doi:10.1021/ja9828509. ISSN 0002-7863.

== Awards ==
Kauzlarich has received numerous awards including:

- Edward Herbert Boomer Memorial Lecture of the University of Alberta (2023)
- ACS AWARD IN INORGANIC CHEMISTRY (2022)
- AAAS Chair-Elect of the Section on Chemistry (2017)
- UC Davis Chancellor's Award for Excellence in Mentoring in Undergraduate Research (2017)
- Distinguished professor, UC Davis (2014)
- Francis P. Garvan-John M. Olin Medal (2013)
- Geoffrey Coates Lecture, University of Wyoming (2013)
- Fellow, American Chemical Society (2011)
- Patrick Lecture, Kansas State (2011)
- IUPAC Distinguished Women in Chemistry/Chemical Engineering (2011)
- Iota Sigma Pi, National Honorary Member (2011)
- Fellow, American Association for the Advancement of Science (2009)
- Presidential Award for Excellence in Science, Mathematics, and Engineering Mentoring (2009)
- NASA Tech Brief Award NPO 42627: High Efficiency of Yb14MnSb11 For Thermoelectric Power Generation(2006)
- UC Davis Distinguished Graduate Mentoring Award (2005)
- Outstanding Mentor Award from the UCD Consortium for Women and Research (2001-2002)
- Maria Goeppert Mayer Distinguished Scholar Award, Argonne National Laboratory (1997)
