= Peter Brock (disambiguation) =

Peter Brock (1945–2006) was an Australian racing car driver.

Peter Brock may also refer to:

- Pete Brock (born 1936), American racing car designer, notably of the Shelby Daytona coupé
- Pete Brock (American football) (born 1954), played for New England Patriots from 1976 to 1987
- Peter Brock (historian) (1920–2006), Canadian historian of pacifism
- Peter Felix Brock (1805–1875), imperial Russian statesman of Prussian descent, Minister of Finance of the Russian Empire (1852–58)
