= General Brock (wreck, 1826) =

The General Brock was a sailing brig, that sank after a collision with another vessel, on May 29, 1826.

The 97 tonne vessel was built in Nova Scotia, in 1821, for Janvrin & Tupper, a channel island company. She was originally registered in Nova Scotia, but her registration was changed to Jersey.

The collision occurred during a dense fog, on the Grand Banks, while the ship was heading from St. Helier, Jersey to Janvrin & Tupper's outposts in Gaspé. The Francis, the brig that struck the General Brock was relatively undamaged. Three of the General Brock's complement were able to board the Francis before the ships were disentangled. The captain of the Francis tried to sail close enough to the General Brock to take off the rest of the crew, but lost her, in the dense fog.

One of the remaining fifteen men in her complement drowned, as the ship flooded. Fourteen members of the crew were able to get off, in a small boat. But the boat was poorly equipped as an escape vessel. Only a single pair of oars were on board, and the only food was a roll of cheese. There was also practically no water.

The survivors saw another vessel, on the fifth day, June 2, but were too far away to row to it. A survivor of the crash died the night after they sighted the other vessel. The remaining men resorted to cannibalism, and ate him. The survivors ate five more men who died, before they were finally rescued, on June 8. Of the eight men who were rescued from the boat, half were to die of exposure, after their rescue.

The three men who jumped aboard the Francis weren't heard from for over four months, through a letter written home on August 6, from Pernambuco, Brazil.

Doug Ford, writing in Jersey Heritage magazine, noted a relative lack of coverage of the cannibalism in Jersey's papers. He speculated that Jersey readers recognized that cannibalism was a necessary expedient, when the alternative was death, for everyone.

Specifications
length:	62.333 feet (18.999 m)
beam:	20.5 feet (6.2 m)
draft:	10 feet (3.0 m)
tonnage:	97 or 109 tonnes
