= Kevin Brock =

Kevin Brock may refer to:

- Kevin Brock (footballer) (born 1962), English former footballer
- Kevin Brock (American football) (born 1986), American football tight end
