= John Brock (footballer) =

English footballer

Personal information
- Full name: John George Graham Brock
- Date of birth: 15 December 1915
- Date of death: 1976 (aged 60–61)
- Position: Goalkeeper

College career
Years	Team	Apps	(Gls)
- University of Bristol

Senior career*
Years	Team	Apps	(Gls)
1935	Forest Green Rovers		
- Swindon Town
- Forest Green Rovers
- Gloucester City
- * Club domestic league appearances and goals

John George Graham Brock (15 December 1915 – 1976) was an English footballer who played as a goalkeeper for Swindon Town.

Turned out for Bristol University before joining Forest Green Rovers in 1935 he was then soon trailing before eventually joining Swindon Town who paid 1 Guinea to cover his services

He later returned to Forest Green Rovers shortly before World War II and later played for Gloucester City.
