= Harry B. Brock Jr. =

American banker and philanthropist

- Born: March 31, 1925; Fort Payne, Alabama
- Died: July 29, 2015 (aged 90)
- Education: Tennessee Military Institute; University of Alabama (BSc)
- Occupations: Banker; philanthropist
- Spouse: Jane (m. 1949)
- Children: 3 (Stanley M. Brock, Barrett Brock MacKay, and Harry B. Brock III)

Harry B. Brock Jr. (March 31, 1925 – July 29, 2015) was an American banker and philanthropist.

== Early life ==
Harry B. Brock Jr. was born on March 31, 1925, in Fort Payne, Alabama. He grew up in Gadsden, Alabama. He graduated from the Tennessee Military Institute and served in the U.S. Navy Submarine Service during the Second World War from 1944 to 1946. He then graduated from the University of Alabama with a Bachelor of Science degree in Commerce and Business Administration in 1949. In 1964, he earned a certificate from the American Institute of Banking.

== Career ==
Back in Gadsden, Brock first worked as a truck driver for the Brook-Martin Oil Company. He later worked as a car salesman with John Thomas Motors of Gadsden. In 1964, he co-founded the Central Bank and Trust Company (later known as Compass Bank, eventually BBVA Compass). In 1968, together with other investors, he gained voting control of the State National Bank of Alabama. In 1981, he merged the two banks. By 1987, Central Bancshares of the South was the first bank in Alabama to own a bank in another state. He retired from the Board of Directors in 1991.

He served on the Board of Directors of Marathon Industries and the Daniel International Corporation (now merged with the Fluor Corporation).

He served on the Board of the Alabama Alliance of Business and Industry. He was inducted into the Alabama Academy of Honor in 1983 and the Alabama Business Hall of Fame in 1993. He also became an honoree of the Birmingham Business Hall of Fame in 1999.

== Philanthropy ==
Brock sat on the Board of Trustees of Samford University, where the Brock School of Business is named in his honor. He has also served on the President's Cabinet at his alma mater, the University of Alabama. He has served on the board of the Southern Research Institute and the Gorgas Scholarship Foundation. He has also volunteered for Kiwanis.

== Personal life and death ==
He married Jane in 1949, shortly after he graduated from college. They have three children, Stanley M. Brock; Barrett Brock MacKay; and Harry B. Brock III. Brock died on July 29, 2015.
