= BBVA USA =

Former American bank based in Alabama

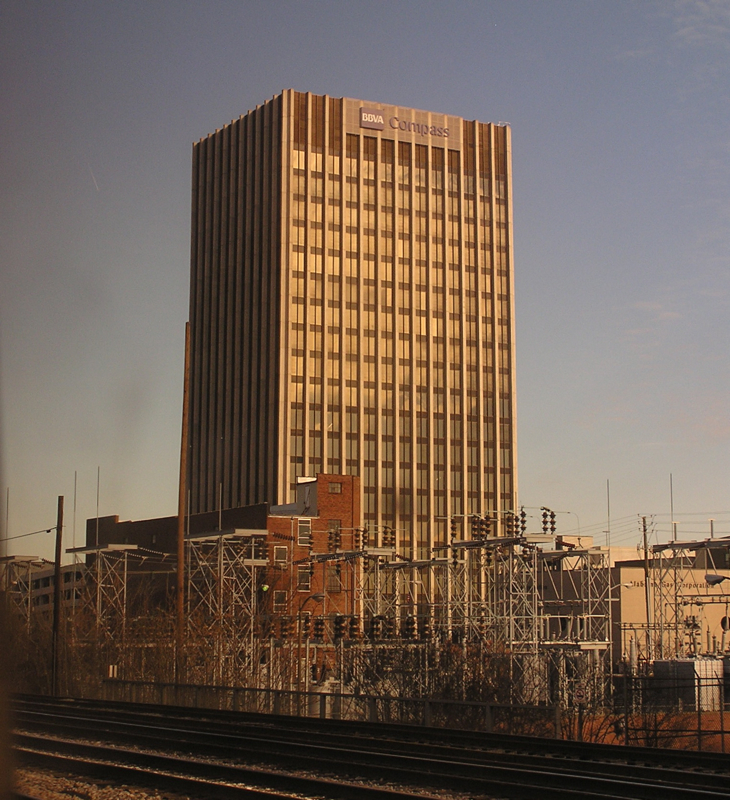
- Daniel Building, the former headquarters of BBVA USA in Birmingham, AL
- Formerly: Central Bank and Trust Company (1964–1973); Central Bank of Birmingham (1973–1981); Central Bank of the South (1981–1993); Compass Bank (1993–2008); BBVA Compass (2008–2019)
- Industry: Banking
- Founded: March 2, 1964; 62 years ago
- Founder: Harry B. Brock Jr.
- Defunct: June 1, 2021; 5 years ago (as an independent bank); October 12, 2021; 4 years ago (as a brand)
- Fate: Acquired by PNC Financial Services
- Successor: PNC Bank
- Headquarters: Daniel Building, Birmingham, Alabama
- Parent: Central and State National Corporation (1970–1973); Central Bancshares of the South Inc. (1973–1993); Compass Bancshares (1993–2007); BBVA (2007–2021); PNC Financial Services (2021)

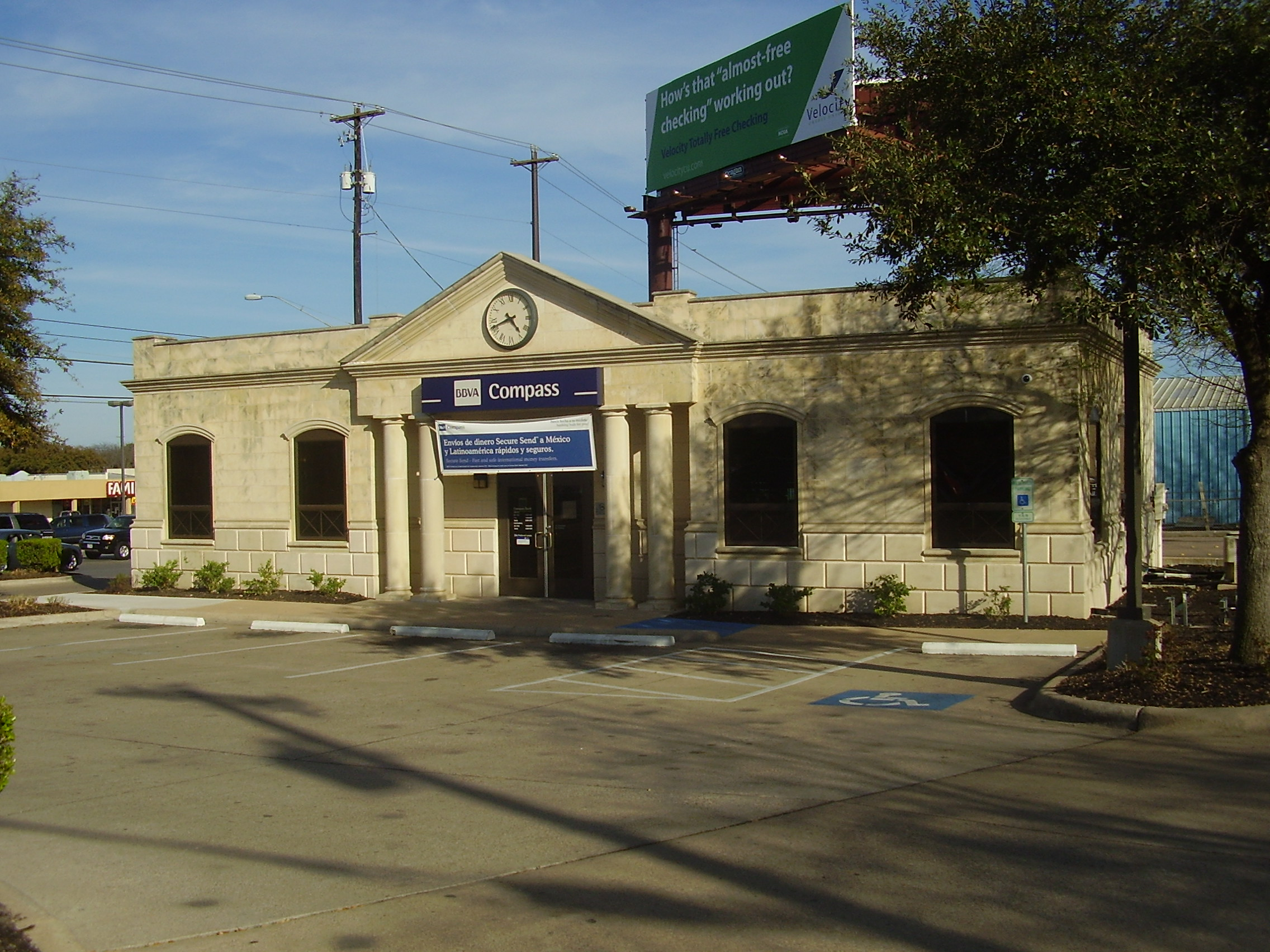
Former BBVA Compass branch in Austin, Texas

BBVA USA was a bank headquartered in Birmingham, Alabama. It was a subsidiary of Banco Bilbao Vizcaya Argentaria from 2007 until 2021, when it was acquired by PNC Financial Services. It operated mainly in Alabama, Arizona, California, Colorado, Florida, New Mexico, and Texas. The bank was earlier named Central Bank and Trust Company, Central Bank, Central Bancshares of the South, and Compass Bancshares.

== History ==
On March 2, 1964, the company was founded as the Central Bank and Trust Company by Harry B. Brock Jr., Schuyler Baker, and Hugh Daniel with US$1 million of capital. Other founding directors included Frank L. Hardy, John R. Israel, Wendell H. Taylor, and Stewart Welch.

In 1967, the company moved into a new headquarters building on 20th Street South, now the University of Alabama at Birmingham Administration Building.

In 1971, Central made a hostile takeover bid for State National Bank in Decatur, the only bank that could open branches across county lines. The bid was supported by Hugh Agricola and other shareholders of the First National Bank of Gadsden, which had been bought by State National. It was financed by a US$10 million line of credit from the Bank of Virginia, which was pioneering its own statewide banking company. By July, Central was able to assemble a voting trust representing about a third of State National's shares in advance of a public offering of US$70 per share. The City National Bank of Birmingham, which had also been planning a merger, countered with $80 per share. Central instructed their brokers to buy as many shares as they could up to $85 and ended with enough shares to control State National's board.

In response, Alabama's other major banks filed several court actions in an attempt to block the merger. One action, brought in Federal Court, did succeed in blocking it, on the technicality that Alabama's banking laws, under which the state-chartered bank operated, were incompatible on a few points with Federal banking laws that governed the national banks in the area of mergers. While this finding was being appealed, banking lobbyists were pushing for new legislation that would prevent the merged company from being able to operate in more than one county. Brock and Central Bank's other officers personally lobbied against the bill. Although it would have passed easily, the bill died in committee without reaching the floor for a vote. The result of the failed bill was that statewide bank holding companies were recognized as a legal possibility for the first time, and the other major banks moved quickly to organize while Central was waiting for a decision. Another group, led by Frank Plummer, Norman Pless, and Bob Lowery, formed Alabama's first statewide holding company while Central's appeal was pending. This group even stole Brock's intended name for Central's proposed holding company, First Alabama Bancshares, forerunner of Regions Financial Corporation. Central did win an appeal and reorganized as the Central and State National Corporation, which was soon renamed Central Bancshares of the South.

In 1981, Central and a coalition of other bank holding companies successfully lobbied for the Bank Merger Act, allowing statewide bank branching under a single banking company. The bank began pursuing interstate banking in the legislature, and, in November 1984, was successful, again with the help of other big banks, in passing enabling legislation that took effect in 1986.

The bank's first acquisition out of state was the failing First National Bank of Crosby, Texas in February 1987. Central Bancshares became the first bank in Alabama to own a bank in another state and the first out-of-state bank to own a bank in Texas.

D. Paul Jones took over the CEO position from Brock in 1991.

In November 1993, the bank changed its name from Central Bancshares of the South Inc. to Compass Bancshares to reflect its expansion outside the South.

In 1995, Brock favored a sale of the company to First Union; Jones successfully led a shareholder vote against the merger, saying there was more value to be earned as an independent company.

During Jones's tenure, Compass Bancshares expanded into Florida and the west with the acquisitions of banks in Arizona, Colorado, and New Mexico.

In 1999, the company rejected a merger proposal from AmSouth.

On September 7, 2007, Banco Bilbao Vizcaya Argentaria (BBVA), then second largest bank in Spain, acquired the company. In late 2008, Compass modified its name to BBVA Compass.

In January 2008, Gary Hegel became CEO of the company.

In March 2008, BBVA announced that it received Federal approval to integrate its four subsidiary banks (State National; Texas State Bank; Laredo National Bank; and Compass Bank) into a single organization initially called "Citation", which would become known as "BBVA Compass".

In December 2008, Manolo Sanchez became CEO of the company.

On August 21, 2009, in a Federal Deposit Insurance Corporation-supervised transaction, BBVA Compass acquired the deposits and other core assets of Guaranty Bank of Austin, Texas, which suffered from bank failure. The deal gave BBVA Compass a presence in California and expanded an existing presence in Texas.

In 2009, the bank launched the BBVA Compass ClearPoints Card, a rewards card with an associated mobile app that notably allows for real-time, in-person redemption of rewards points.

In 2010, Garcia Meyer-Dohner stepped down as the bank's chairman and U.S. country manager for BBVA. BBVA Compass president and CEO Manolo Sánchez was appointed to also assume Garcia Meyer-Dohner's role as the U.S. country manager for BBVA. Board member Lawrence R. Uhlick was chosen to serve as BBVA Compass chairman.

In April 2011, BBVA Compass announced the construction of a new-eco-efficient corporate office building in Houston's Galleria area, which would serve as BBVA Compass Bancshares, Inc. headquarters.

BBVA Compass was one of over 30 banks accused of improperly manipulating customers’ checking account transactions to generate excess overdraft fees by posting them in highest-to-lowest dollar amount instead of in chronological order. In July 2012, the bank agreed to pay $11.5 million to settle the lawsuit.

In 2013, BBVA further expanded its regional presence with the opening of BBVA Compass Plaza, a 312,000-square-foot (29,000 m^{2}) office building in Houston.

In April 2014, BBVA USA opened its renovated Development Center.

In 2014, BBVA Compass disclosed that the results of its periodic examination for compliance with the Community Reinvestment Act (CRA) would probably restrict its ability to engage in additional mergers and acquisitions until after its next scheduled examination. After that disclosure, BBVA Compass announced several actions to address the issues of community reinvestment, including committing $11 billion to community development lending, and retaining additional staff to manage community development investment.

In October 2015, Money recognized BBVA USA for the best mobile banking app of the year.

In December 2016, Onur Genç became CEO of the company. Manolo Sánchez became non-executive chairman. In 2017, Sánchez retired.

In December 2018, Javier Rodríguez Soler became CEO of BBVA Compass.

In June 2019, BBVA Compass was renamed BBVA USA.

On June 1, 2021 the company was acquired by PNC Financial Services.

== U.S. sporting sponsorship ==
On 13 September 2010 BBVA became an official sponsor of the NBA.

On 12 May 2012, BBVA Compass Stadium was opened in Houston with BBVA USA as sponsor. It was built as the venue for the Houston Dynamo Major League Soccer. Since 2014, the stadium has also hosted home games of the Houston Dash, a team in the National Women's Soccer League owned and operated by the Dynamo.

BBVA also sponsored BBVA Field, a college and lower division soccer venue on the campus of University of Alabama at Birmingham in Birmingham, Alabama. The venue has served as the home field for both the UAB Blazers men's and women's soccer teams since its opening in October 2015 as the replacement for West Campus Field. Birmingham Legion FC, a lower division soccer club playing in the USL Championship also leased BBVA Field from 2019 to 2021 when they ended their lease early.

From 2011 to 2014, BBVA USA was the title sponsor of the Birmingham Bowl (then called the BBVA Compass Bowl), a college football bowl game played annually in Birmingham.

== Acquisition history ==
Company	Date	Ref(s).
First National Bank of Crosby, Texas	February 26, 1987	
City National Bank of Plano, Texas	November 10, 1989	
River Oaks Bancshares	March 28, 1991	
Promenade Bancshares	July 31, 1991	
FWNB Bancshares	December 22, 1992	
Cornerstone Bancshares	January 19, 1993	
First Federal Savings Bank of Northwest Florida	October 14, 1993	
First Performance National Bank	January 27, 1994	
First Heights Bank FSB	October 1, 1994	
Equitable Bankshares	April 11, 1996	
Post Oak Bank	April 19, 1996	
CFB Bancorp	August 23, 1996	
Enterprise National Bank	January 15, 1997	
Horizon Bancorp	March 12, 1997	
Central Texas Bancorp	July 15, 1997	
GSB Investments	January 13, 1998	
Fidelity Resources Company	February 9, 1998	
Arizona Bank	December 15, 1998	
Norwest/Wells Fargo offices	April 19, 1999	
Heartland Bank	October 20, 1999	
Western Bancshares	January 13, 2000	
MegaBank Financial Corporation	April 3, 2000	
Founders Bank of Arizona	July 17, 2000	
FirsTier Corporation	January 4, 2001	
TexasBanc Holding Company	March 24, 2006	
Simple	2014	
