= Andrew C. Brock =

American politician (born 1974)

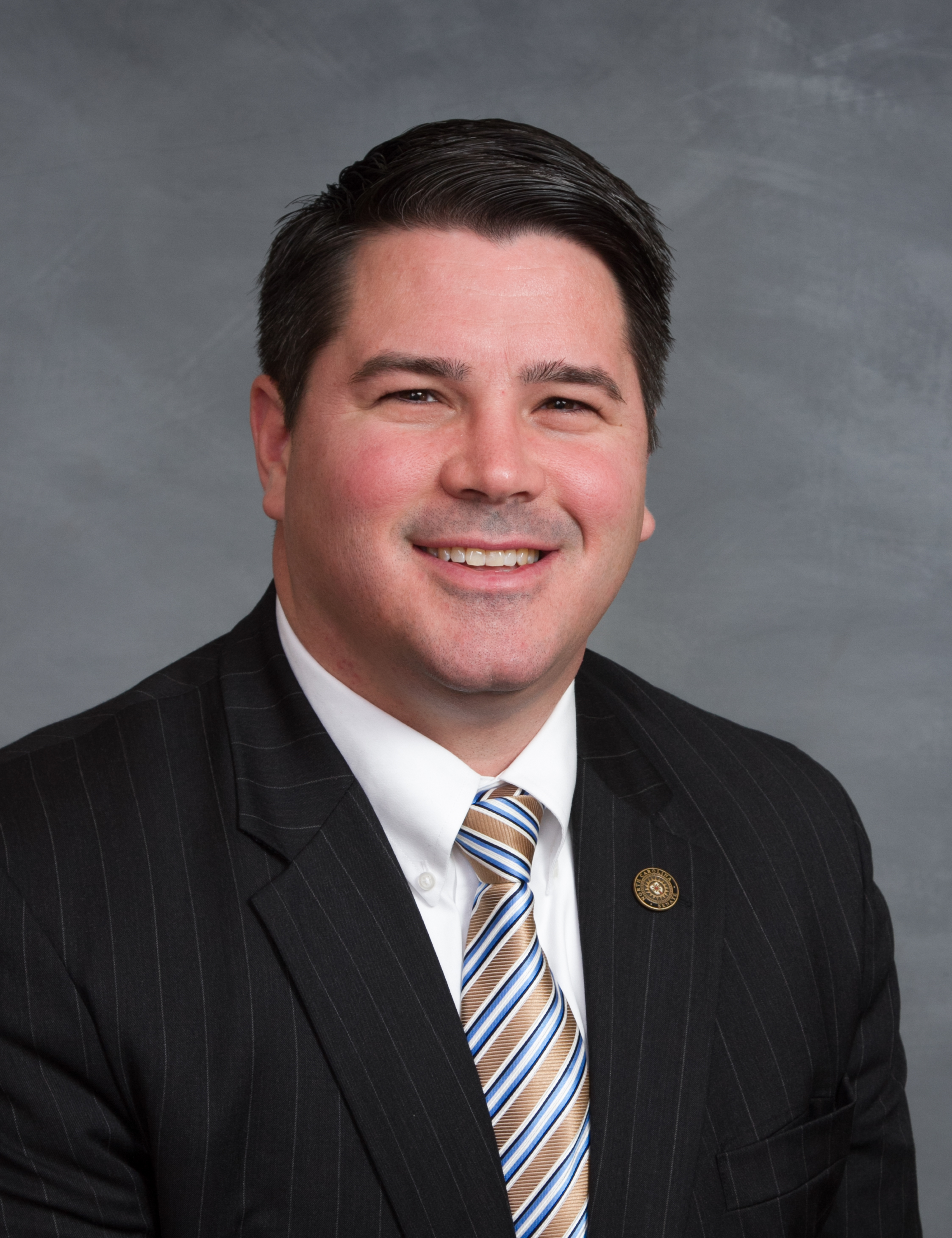

Member of the North Carolina Senate from the 34th district
- In office January 1, 2003 – June 30, 2017
- Preceded by: Constituency Established
- Succeeded by: Dan Barrett

Personal details
- Born: April 9, 1974 (age 52) Davie County, North Carolina, U.S.
- Party: Republican
- Spouse: Andrea
- Children: 3
- Education: Western Carolina University (BS)
- Occupation: Consultant
- Website: www.andrewbrock.com

Andrew C. Brock (born April 9, 1974) served as a Republican member of the North Carolina General Assembly, representing the state's thirty-fourth Senate district from 2003 to 2017. During his tenure, he represented Yadkin, Davie, Iredell, and Rowan counties. He also served as the Republican deputy whip in the Senate.

== Early life and education ==
Andrew C. Brock born was on April 9, 1974, in Davie County, North Carolina. His grandfather, Burr Brock Sr., served in the North Carolina House of Representatives and Senate.

Brock attended Davie County High School and graduated from Western Carolina University, where he majored in economics and political science. He served as student body president, vice president, and senator in the Student Government Association. Brock also served on the governing board of the University of North Carolina Association of Student Governments.

After college, Brock worked for the Conference on Poverty to promote welfare reform in North Carolina. He also worked on the re-election campaign of Senator Lauch Faircloth and as campaign manager for Bill Cobey’s campaign for chairman of the North Carolina Republican Party. Brock later worked for the Republican Party of North Carolina as campaign manager for Congressman Walter Jones, and for Citizens for a Sound Economy.

== State Senate ==
Brock was elected to the North Carolina Senate in the fall of 2002. He acted as the deputy Republican whip. Brock was at times the chairman of the Finance Committee, Natural and Economic Resources Appropriations Committee, Agriculture/ Environment/ Natural Resources Committee, General Government, Health & Human Services Committee, and Joint Information Technology Oversight Committee. Brock served as vice-chairman of the Redistricting committee. He also served as a member of the Joint Governmental Operations Committee, the Finance Committee, the Senate Rules Committee, Appropriations/Base Budget Committee, Program Evaluation Committee, the Emergency Response and Preparedness Committee, Joint Education Oversight Committee, Judiciary, and the Ways and Means Committee.

He resigned in 2017 to accept a position on the Board of Review for the state Division of Employment Security.

== Run for Congress ==
On February 22, 2016, Brock announced that he would run for the United States House of Representatives in the newly reconfigured 13th congressional district. Incumbent George Holding had previously announced that he would run in the 2nd district rather than stand for reelection in the 13th district.

Brock lost the June 2016 Republican primary to Ted Budd.

== Run for Clerk of Court ==
Brock ran for the Davie County Clerk of Court in late 2021 and early 2022. He lost by around 200 votes to Jason Lawrence in the spring of 2022.

== Personal life ==
Brock is married to Andrea Gentry of the Pino Community in Davie County, and together they have two daughters and one son, Scarlett Hope, Stella Faith, and Turner Ward.

== Electoral history ==
Electoral History of Andrew C. Brock, current North Carolina Senator for the 34th State Senate district, covering Rowan and Davie Counties.

North Carolina Senate District 38 Republican Primary Election 2000
Party	Candidate	Votes	%
Republican	Larry W. Potts	2,796	25.76
Republican	Stan Bingham	2,738	25.23
Republican	James B. Neely	2,493	22.97
Republican	Andrew Brock	2,343	21.59
Republican	Nicholas A. Slogick	292	2.69
Republican	Nate Pendley	190	1.75
Majority		58	0.53
Total votes		10,852	100.00

North Carolina Senate District 34 Republican Primary Election 2002
Party	Candidate	Votes	%
Republican	Andrew C. Brock	6,816	36.69
Republican	Gus Andrews	5,972	32.15
Republican	Mac Butner	4,830	26.00
Republican	Baxter (Bo) Turner	957	5.15
Majority		844	4.54
Total votes		18,575	100.00

North Carolina Senate District 34 General Election 2002
Party	Candidate	Votes	%
Republican	Andrew C. Brock	28,593	60.19
Democratic	John Carlyle Sherrill, III	17,625	37.10
Libertarian	J. Conrad Jones	1,290	2.72
Majority		10968	23.09
Total votes		18,575	100.00

North Carolina Senate District 34 Republican Primary Election 2004
Party	Candidate	Votes	%
Republican	Andrew C. Brock	7,726	66.76
Republican	Gus Andrews	3,846	33.24
Majority		3880	33.53
Total votes		11,572	100.00

North Carolina Senate District 34 General Election 2004
Party	Candidate	Votes	%
Republican	Andrew C. Brock	41,800	63.31
Democratic	Larry C. Brown	24,223	36.69
Majority		17577	26.62
Total votes		66,023	100.00

North Carolina Senate District 34 General Election 2006
Party	Candidate	Votes	%
Republican	Andrew C. Brock	21,608	60.60
Democratic	Larry C. Brown	14,048	39.40
Majority		7560	21.20
Total votes		35,656	100.00

North Carolina Senate District 34 General Election 2008
Party	Candidate	Votes	%
Republican	Andrew C. Brock	47,960	61.17
Democratic	William A. Burnette	30,443	38.83
Majority		17517	22.34
Total votes		78,403	100.00

North Carolina Senate District 34 General Election 2010
Party	Candidate	Votes	%
Republican	Andrew C. Brock (unopposed)	36,969	100.00
Majority		36969	100.00
Total votes		36,969	100.00

North Carolina Senate
Preceded by T. L. "Fountain" Odom	Member of the North Carolina Senate from the 34th district 2003–2017	Succeeded by Dan Barrett
