= Daniel Building =

20-story office building located in downtown Birmingham, Alabama

- Daniel Building in Birmingham, Alabama

General information
- Status: Completed
- Type: Corporate Headquarters
- Location: 15 South Twentieth Street Birmingham, Alabama, USA
- Coordinates: 33.51217°N 86.80345°W
- Opening: 1970
- Owner: UAB Medicine Enterprise; (2023–present)
- Operator: Daniel Corporation

Height
- Antenna spire: 283 feet (86 m)
- Top floor: 20

Technical details
- Floor count: 20
- Floor area: 318,000 square feet (29,543 m^{2})

Design and construction
- Main contractor: Daniel International

The Daniel Building is a 20-story, 238 foot (86 m) office building located in downtown Birmingham, Alabama. Built in 1970, the building originally served as a regional office for the engineering and construction company Daniel International. It also served as the corporate headquarters for Daniel International's real estate division, Daniel Realty, which today is known as Daniel Corporation.

In 1993, Compass Bancshares bought the building from Daniel Corporation. After completing an extensive renovation, Compass moved its corporate headquarters into the building from its old headquarters, which had been sold to the University of Alabama at Birmingham (UAB) for expanded administrative offices. It is the tallest building in downtown Birmingham outside of the Central Business District.

On July 5, 2010, a two-alarm electrical fire broke out in the basement of the Daniel Building. There was severe damage to the basement, with water damage to the first floor and smoke damage extending several floors into the building. Employees were relocated to other facilities while the building was repaired.

On September 6, 2023, it was announced that UAB Medicine Enterprise had acquired the building for $16 million.

== See also ==
- PNC Financial Services
- Birmingham, Alabama
- Fluor Corp.
