= Burr Brock Sr. =

American politician and lawyer (1891–1968)

Burr Coley Brock Sr. (26 November 1891 – 17 December 1968) was an American lawyer and politician.

He was born in Farmington, North Carolina, on 26 November 1891. He attended UNC Chapel Hill. He began a private legal practice in Winston-Salem in 1916, and moved his firm to Mocksville in 1925. Brock served several non-consecutive terms as a member of the North Carolina General Assembly, within the North Carolina House of Representatives in 1917, 1933, 1935, 1951, 1957 and 1959, and the North Carolina Senate in 1937, 1943, 1949, 1955 and 1961. As a state representative, Brock was named minority leader of the state house during the 1933 and 1957 terms. Between 1937 and 1959, Brock sat on the State Republican Executive Committee. He was also an appointed trustee of Appalachian State University. He died at the age of 77 on 17 December 1968. Burr Brock Sr. was married to Laura McPherson Tabor Brock. His grandson Andrew C. Brock has also served as a state legislator.
