= Matt Brock (American football player) =

American football player (born 1966)

No. 62, 94
- Position: Defensive end

Personal information
- Born: January 14, 1966 (age 60); Ogden, Utah, U.S.
- Listed height: 6 ft 5 in (1.96 m)
- Listed weight: 300 lb (136 kg)

Career information
- High school: University City (California)
- College: Oregon
- NFL draft: 1989: 3rd round, 58th overall pick

Career history
- Green Bay Packers (1989–1994); New York Jets (1995–1996)

Awards and highlights
- First-team All-Pac-10 (1988)

Career NFL statistics
- Games played: 108
- Tackles: 297
- Sacks: 19.5
- Stats at Pro Football Reference

Matthew Lee Brock (born January 14, 1966) is an American former professional football player who played defensive end for eight seasons in the National Football League (NFL). He was selected by the Green Bay Packers in the third round of the 1989 NFL draft with the 58th overall pick.

His father Clyde Brock also played in the NFL and played for 12 seasons in the Canadian Football League (CFL), where he was a member of the Hall of Fame. Clyde and his team won the CFL Grey Cup in 1966, the year of Matt's birth.
