= Ray L. Brock Jr. =

American judge (1922–2002)

Ray Leonard Brock Jr. (September 21, 1922 – September 26, 2002) was a justice of the Tennessee Supreme Court from 1974 to 1987, serving for a time as chief justice.

== Education and career ==
Born in McDonald, Tennessee, Brock attended the Citadel, the University of Tennessee in Knoxville and the University of Colorado, and then served in the U.S. Army during World War II, from 1942 to 1944. He received an LL.B. from Duke University in 1948 and entered the practice of law in Chattanooga, Tennessee the same year.

In 1963, Governor Frank G. Clement appointed Brock to a seat on the Hamilton County, Tennessee County Chancery Court, to which Brock was elected in 1964 and reelected in 1966, remaining in that position until his election to the Tennessee Supreme Court in 1974. On July 1, 1979, he was elected chief justice. He was reelected to the Supreme Court in 1982, remaining until his retirement on June 15, 1987.

== Personal life ==
Brock married Juanita Barker of Hixson, Tennessee, with whom he had two daughters. He died in a hospital in Chattanooga from diabetes, at the age of 80.

Political offices
| Preceded by Court substantially renewed | Justice of the Tennessee Supreme Court; 1974–1987 | Succeeded by Charles H. O'Brien |
