= Brueckner =

Brueckner is a surname of German origin. Notable people with the surname include:

- Benedikt Brueckner (born 1990), German professional ice hockey player
- Georg F Brueckner (1930–1992), German martial arts pioneer and inventor
- Guenter Brueckner (1934–1998), American solar physicist
- Keith Brueckner (1924–2014), American theoretical physicist

== See also ==
- Bruch/Von dem Bruch/Vom Bruch, Bruche, Bruck/Brück/Brueck, von Bruck, Bruk
- Brucke/Brücke, Brücker, Brückner, Brueckner, Brückl
- Brog, Brugge/Brügge, Brüggen/Van Bruggen, van Brug, Brøgger/Brügger,Tebrügge, Bruegge
- Bruckman, Bruckmann, Bruggeman, Brüggermann, Brugman, Brugmans, Brugmann
- Brock/Broeck, Brocke, Broek, Broekx, Broke, Broucke, Ten Broeck, Ten Broek, Ten Broeke, Ten Brook, Van den Broek/Van den Broeck, Van den Broecke, Vandenbroucke
