= Bruckner (surname) =

Bruckner, Brueckner or Brückner (German: from Middle Low German brugge or Middle High German brugge, brücke, or brügge "bridge" + the agent suffix -ner, hence a topographic name for someone living by a bridge, an occupational name for a bridge toll collector, or in the southeast (Silesia for example), a bridge keeper or repairer) is a surname. Notable people with the surname include:

- Agnes Bruckner (born 1985), American actress
- Aleksander Brückner (1856–1939), Polish philologist
- Alexander Brückner (1834–1896), Baltic German historian
- Amy Bruckner (born 1991), American actress
- Anton Bruckner (1824–1896), Austrian composer, music theorist and classical organist
- David Bruckner (c. 1977), American film director
- D. J. R. Bruckner (1933–2013), American journalist
- Eduard Brückner (1862–1927), German scientist
- Ferdinand Bruckner (1891–1958), Austrian-German writer and theater manager
- Helmuth Brückner (1896–1951), German politician
- Henry Bruckner (1871–1942), American politician
- Karl Bruckner (1906–1986), Austrian writer
- Karel Brückner (born 1939), Czech football coach
- Maik Brückner (born 1992), German politician
- Max Brückner (1860–1934), German geometer
- Pascal Bruckner (born 1948), French writer
- Ronny Bruckner (1957–2013), Belgian businessman
- Wilhelm Brückner (1884–1954)
- Wilhelm Brückner (murderer) (c.1894–1925)
- Wilhelm Brückner (luthier) (1932–2025), German violin maker
- Wilhelm Brückner-Rüggeberg (1906–1985)

== See also ==
- Bruch/Von dem Bruch/Vom Bruch, Bruche, Bruck/Brück/Brueck, von Bruck, Bruk
- Brucke/Brücke, Brücker, Brückner, Brückl
- Brog, Brugge/Brügge, Brüggen/Van Bruggen, van Brug, Brøgger/Brügger,Tebrügge, Bruegge
- Bruckman, Bruckmann, Bruggeman, Brüggermann, Brugman, Brugmans, Brugmann
- Brock/Broeck, Brocke, Broek, Broekx, Broke, Broucke, Ten Broeck, Ten Broek, Ten Broeke, Ten Brook, Van den Broek/Van den Broeck, Van den Broecke, Vandenbroucke
