= Bruggeman =

Bruggeman is a surname. Notable people with the surname include:

- Annefleur Bruggeman (born 1997), Dutch handball player
- Dick Bruggeman (born 1942), American hurdler
- Hans Bruggeman (1927–2016), Dutch politician
- Lore Bruggeman (born 2002), Belgian skateboarder
- Molly Bruggeman (born 1992), American rower
- Prosper Bruggeman (1873–?), Belgian rower
- Rob Bruggeman (born 1986), American football player

== See also ==
- Bruch/Von dem Bruch/Vom Bruch, Bruche, Bruck/Brück/Brueck, von Bruck, Bruk
- Brucke/Brücke, Brücker, Brückner, Brückl
- Brog, Brugge/Brügge, Brüggen/Van Bruggen, van Brug, Brøgger/Brügger,Tebrügge, Bruegge
- Bruckman, Bruckmann, Bruggeman, Brüggermann, Brugman, Brugmans, Brugmann
- Brock/Broeck, Brocke, Broek, Broekx, Broke, Broucke, Ten Broeck, Ten Broek, Ten Broeke, Ten Brook, Van den Broek/Van den Broeck, Van den Broecke, Vandenbroucke
