= Brugmann =

Brugmann is a German surname. Notable people with the surname include:

- Bruce B. Brugmann, editor and publisher of the San Francisco Bay Guardian
- Georges Brugmann (1829–1900), Belgian banker and philanthropist
- Karl Brugmann (1849–1919), German linguist
  - Brugmann's law
- Samantha Brugmann, American biologist
- Walter Brugmann (1887–1944), German architect

== See also ==
- Brugmann Mountains
- Houba-Brugmann metro station, one of the metro stations on line 6 of the Brussels Metro
- Bruch/Von dem Bruch/Vom Bruch, Bruche, Bruck/Brück/Brueck, von Bruck, Bruk
- Brucke/Brücke, Brücker, Brückner, Brückl
- Brog, Brugge/Brügge, Brüggen/Van Bruggen, van Brug, Brøgger/Brügger,Tebrügge, Bruegge
- Bruckman, Bruckmann, Bruggeman, Brüggermann, Brugman, Brugmans, Brugmann
- Brock/Broeck, Brocke, Broek, Broekx, Broke, Broucke, Ten Broeck, Ten Broek, Ten Broeke, Ten Brook, Van den Broek/Van den Broeck, Van den Broecke, Vandenbroucke
