= Brugman =

Brugman is a Dutch toponymic surname meaning "bridgeman". It could refer to someone living near a bridge, or as an occupational name to a bridge keeper. In some cases it refers to someone originally from Bruges (Brugge) in West Flanders. Notable people with the surname include:

- Alyssa Brugman (born 1974), Australian author
- Gastón Brugman (born 1992), Uruguayan football midfielder
- Jaycob Brugman (born 1992), American baseball player
- John Brugman (c.1400–1473), Franciscan preacher in the Low Countries
- Mathias Brugman (1811–1868), Puerto Rican revolutionary leader
- Til Brugman (1888–1958), Dutch poet and linguist

== See also ==
- Bruch/Von dem Bruch/Vom Bruch, Bruche, Bruck/Brück/Brueck, von Bruck, Bruk
- Brucke/Brücke, Brücker, Brückner, Brückl
- Brog, Brugge/Brügge, Brüggen/Van Bruggen, van Brug, Brøgger/Brügger,Tebrügge, Bruegge
- Bruckman, Bruckmann, Bruggeman, Brüggermann, Brugman, Brugmans, Brugmann
- Brock/Broeck, Brocke, Broek, Broekx, Broke, Broucke, Ten Broeck, Ten Broek, Ten Broeke, Ten Brook, Van den Broek/Van den Broeck, Van den Broecke, Vandenbroucke
