= Bruckmann =

Bruckmann is a German surname. Notable people with the surname include:

- Alexander Bruckmann (1806–1852), German painter
- Elsa Bruckmann (1865–1946), wife of Hugo Bruckmann
- Erich Bruckmann (1930–2011), Canadian boat builder
- Franz Ernst Brückmann (1697–1753), German doctor and mineralogist
- Gergő Bruckmann (born 1995), Hungarian modern pentathlete
- Gerhart Bruckmann (1932–2024), Austrian politician
- Hugo Bruckmann (1863–1941), German publisher
- Kyle Bruckmann (born 1971), American composer and oboist

== See also ==
- GeraNova Bruckmann, German publishing house based in Munich
- Bruckmann, Rosser, Sherrill & Co., private equity firm

== See also ==
- Bruch/Von dem Bruch/Vom Bruch, Bruche, Bruck/Brück/Brueck, von Bruck, Bruk
- Brucke/Brücke, Brücker, Brückner, Brückl
- Brog, Brugge/Brügge, Brüggen/Van Bruggen, van Brug, Brøgger/Brügger,Tebrügge, Bruegge
- Bruckman, Bruckmann, Bruggeman, Brüggermann, Brugman, Brugmans, Brugmann
- Brock/Broeck, Brocke, Broek, Broekx, Broke, Broucke, Ten Broeck, Ten Broek, Ten Broeke, Ten Brook, Van den Broek/Van den Broeck, Van den Broecke, Vandenbroucke
