= Broek =

Broek may refer to the following places in the Netherlands:

- Broek op Langedijk
- Broek in Waterland
- Broek, Friesland, in the municipality of De Fryske Marren, province of Friesland
- Broek, Gouda, a former municipality near Gouda, province of South Holland
- Broek, Groningen, in the municipality of De Marne, province of Groningen
- Broek, Gulpen, in the municipality of Gulpen-Wittem, province of Limburg
- Broek, North-Brabant, in the municipality of Laarbeek, province of North Brabant
- Broek, Vijfheerenlanden, in the municipality of Vijfheerenlanden, province of Utrecht
- Broek, a former name of Stede Broec
- Roos Broek, Dutch-Australian field hockey player

== See also ==
- Bruch/Von dem Bruch/Vom Bruch, Bruche, Bruck/Brück/Brueck, von Bruck, Bruk
- Brucke/Brücke, Brücker, Brückner, Brückl
- Brog, Brugge/Brügge, Brüggen/Van Bruggen, van Brug, Brøgger/Brügger, Brüggermann, Tebrügge, Bruegge
- Brock/Broeck, Brocke, Broek, Broekx, Broke, Broucke, Ten Broeck, Ten Broek, Ten Broeke, Ten Brook, Van den Broek/Van den Broeck, Van den Broecke, Vandenbroucke
- Zeebroek (disambiguation)
