= Broke (surname) =

Broke is the surname of:

- Charles Broke Vere (1779–1843), né Broke, English army officer at the time of the Napoleonic Wars
- David Broke or Brooke (c.1498–1560), English judge and Member of Parliament
- George Broke (born 1946), British Army officer, equerry to the Queen
- Philip Broke (1776–1841), Royal Navy officer
- Philip Broke, 2nd Baronet (1804–1855), Royal Navy officer, of the Broke-Middleton baronets
- Richard Broke (judge) (died 1529), English judge
- Robert Broke (died 1558), British justice, politician and legal writer
- Simon Broke (fl.1393–1406), English politician
- Thomas Broke or Brooke (fl.1550), British translator, alderman of Calais
- William Broke, English 16th-century college and university head

== See also ==
- Bruch/Von dem Bruch/Vom Bruch, Bruche, Bruck/Brück/Brueck, von Bruck, Bruk
- Brucke/Brücke, Brücker, Brückner, Brückl
- Brog, Brugge/Brügge, Brüggen/Van Bruggen, van Brug, Brøgger/Brügger, Tebrügge, Bruegge
- Brock/Broeck, Brocke, Broek, Broekx, Broke, Broucke, Ten Broeck, Ten Broek, Ten Broeke, Van den Broek/Van den Broeck, Van den Broecke, Vandenbroucke
