= Vandenbroucke =

Vandenbroucke is a surname. Notable people with the surname include:

- Frank Vandenbroucke (cyclist) (1974–2009), Belgian cyclist
- Frank Vandenbroucke (politician) (born 1955), Belgian politician
- Jan Vandenbroucke (born 1950), Belgian epidemiologist
- Jean-Luc Vandenbroucke (born 1955), Belgian cyclist
- Joris Vandenbroucke (born 1976), Belgian politician
- Rosemary Vandenbroucke (born 1982), Hong Kong singer

== See also ==
- Bruch/Von dem Bruch/Vom Bruch, Bruche, Bruck/Brück/Brueck, von Bruck, Bruk
- Brucke/Brücke, Brücker, Brückner, Brückl
- Brog, Brugge/Brügge, Brüggen/Van Bruggen, van Brug, Brøgger/Brügger, Tebrügge, Bruegge
- Brock/Broeck, Brocke, Broek, Broekx, Broke, Broucke, Ten Broeck, Ten Broek, Ten Broeke, Van den Broek/Van den Broeck, Van den Broecke, Vandenbroucke
