= Broucke =

Broucke is a surname. Notable people with the surname include:

- Mireille Broucke, daughter of Roger, American and Canadian control theorist
- Roger A. Broucke (1932–2005), father of Mireille, Belgian and American aerospace engineer

== See also ==
- Bruch/Von dem Bruch/Vom Bruch, Bruche, Bruck/Brück/Brueck, von Bruck, Bruk
- Brucke/Brücke, Brücker, Brückner, Brückl
- Brog, Brugge/Brügge, Brüggen/Van Bruggen, van Brug, Brøgger/Brügger, Tebrügge, Bruegge
- Brock/Broeck, Brocke, Broek, Broekx, [Broke (surname)|]], Broucke, Ten Broeck, Ten Broek, Ten Broeke, Van den Broek/Van den Broeck, Van den Broecke, Vandenbroucke
