= Bruck (surname) =

Bruck, Brück are German surnames of different origins. "Bruck" comes from the meaning "wetland" or such, occasionally "bridge" while "Brück" comes from the word "bridge". These may also be toponymic surnames originating from places named Bruck or Brück. Notable people with the surname include:

- Abraham Jacob Bruck (1820–1893), Russian educator and writer
- Alwin Brück (1931–2020), German politician
- Andrew Bruck, American lawyer and politician
- Bettina Brück (born 1967), German politician
- Charles Bruck (1911–1995), Hungarian-French conductor
- David Bruck (born 1949), American attorney
- Dietmar Bruck (born 1949), German footballer
- Heinrich Brück (1831–1903), German Roman Catholic bishop
- Hermann Brück (1905–2000), German astronomer
- Inge Brück (1936–2025), German singer and actress
- Karl Ludwig von Bruck (1798–1860), Austrian politician, financier, and entrepreneur
- Karl Brück (1895–1964), German Nazi Party Gauleiter in the Saar
- Ludwig Bruck, Australian physician & medical journalist
- Philipp Bruck (born 1989), German politician
- Richard Hubert Bruck (1914–1991), American mathematician
- Valentin Brück (1911–1980), German politician
- William Bruck (born 1975), American politician
- Yoav Bruck (born 1972), Israeli swimmer

== See also ==
- Bruch/Von dem Bruch/Vom Bruch, Bruche, Bruck/Brück/Brueck, von Bruck, Bruk
- Brucke/Brücke, Brücker, Brückner, Brueckner, Brückl
- Brog, Brugge/Brügge, Brüggen/Van Bruggen, van Brug, Brøgger/Brügger,Tebrügge, Bruegge
- Bruckman, Bruckmann, Bruggeman, Brüggermann, Brugman, Brugmans, Brugmann
- Brock/Broeck, Brocke, Broek, Broekx, Broke, Broucke, Ten Broeck, Ten Broek, Ten Broeke, Ten Brook, Van den Broek/Van den Broeck, Van den Broecke, Vandenbroucke
