= Broekx =

Broekx is a surname of Belgian origin.

- Jaak Broekx (1914–2023), Belgian centenarian
- Jos Broekx (born 1951), Belgian sprint canoer
- Lize Broekx (born 1992), Belgian sprint canoeist
- Paul Broekx (born 1953), Belgian sprint canoer

== See also ==
- Broek (disambiguation)
- Bruch/Von dem Bruch/Vom Bruch, Bruche, Bruck/Brück/Brueck, von Bruck, Bruk
- Brucke/Brücke, Brücker, Brückner, Brückl
- Brog, Brugge/Brügge, Brüggen/Van Bruggen, van Brug, Brøgger/Brügger, Tebrügge, Bruegge
- Brock/Broeck, Brocke, Broek, Broekx, Broke, Broucke, Ten Broeck, Ten Broek, Ten Broeke, Van den Broek/Van den Broeck, Van den Broecke, Vandenbroucke
