= Brukman =

Name

Brukman may refer to:

- Brukman factory (Spanish: Fábrica Brukman), textile factory in Balvanera, Buenos Aires, Argentina
- Jill Brukman (born 1973), South African backstroke- and medley swimmer

== See also ==
- Bruckmann
- Brugmann
- Brugman
- Bruchmann
