= Brocke =

Brocke is a surname. Notable people with this surname include:

- Martin vom Brocke (born 1969), Swiss dentist
- John Brocke (1953–2009), Canadian realist artist
- Jürgen Brocke (1922–1942), German Luftwaffe fighter ace

== See also ==
- Emma Brockes (born 1975), British author
- Jeremy Brockes (born 1948), British biochemist
- Barthold Heinrich Brockes (1680–1747), German poet
- Brock (given name)
- Bruch/Von dem Bruch/Vom Bruch, Bruche, Bruck/Brück/Brueck, von Bruck, Bruk
- Brucke/Brücke, Brücker, Brückner, Brückl
- Brog, Brugge/Brügge, Brüggen/Van Bruggen, van Brug, Brøgger/Brügger, Tebrügge, Bruegge
- Brock/Broeck, Brocke, Ten Broeck, Ten Broek, Ten Broeke, Van den Broek/Van den Broeck, Van den Broecke
