= Brugg (disambiguation) =

Brugg or Brügg may refer to the following places:

== Switzerland ==
- Brugg, Aargau
  - FC Brugg, a football club
  - Brugg District
  - Brugg AG railway station
- Brügg, Bern
  - Brügg BE railway station

== Germany ==
- Brugg, Meckenbeuren, Baden-Württemberg
- Brugg, Gestratz, Bavaria

== See also ==
- Bruck (disambiguation)
- van der Brugge
- Van Bruggen
- Brüggen (disambiguation)
- Bruckner (disambiguation)
- Bruges (disambiguation)
