= Verbruggen =

Verbruggen, Verbrugghen, Verbrugge and Verbrugghe are Dutch toponymic surnames. They are a contraction of "van der Brugge(n)", meaning "from the bridge". Notable people with the surname include:

== Verbruggen / Verbrugghen ==
- Bart Verbruggen (born 2002), Dutch footballer
- Gaspar Peeter Verbruggen the Elder (1635–1681), Flemish painter (father)
- Gaspar Peeter Verbruggen the Younger (1664–1730), Flemish painter (son)
- Hein Verbruggen (1941–2017), Dutch International Olympic Committee member
- Hendrik Frans Verbrugghen (1654–1724), Flemish sculptor
- Henri Verbrugghen (1873–1934), Belgian conductor and violinist, founder of the Verbrugghen String Quartet
- Jakob Verbruggen (born 1980), Belgian TV and film director
- Jan Verbruggen (1712–1781), Dutch painter and master founder
- Joffrey Verbruggen (born 1989), Belgian actor
- John Verbruggen (died 1708), English actor, husband of Susanna
- Marlies Verbruggen (born 1988), Belgian footballer
- Marion Verbruggen (born 1950), Dutch recorder player
- Pieter Verbrugghen I (1615–1686), Flemish sculptor, father of Hendrik Frans and Pieter II
- Pieter Verbrugghen II (1648–1691), Flemish sculptor, draughtsman, etcher and stone merchant
- Susanna Verbruggen (c. 1667–1703), English actor, wife of John

== Verbrugge / Verbrugghe ==
- Albert Verbrugghe, Belgian crime victim
- Angela Verbrugge (active from 1997), Canadian jazz vocalist, lyricist, and composer
- Brecht Verbrugghe (born 1982), Belgian footballer
- Carel Verbrugge (1926–1985), Dutch singer, actor and radio/TV personality known as "Willy Alberti"
- Cyrille Verbrugge (1866–1929), Belgian fencer
- Henri Verbrugghe (1929–2009), Belgian sprint canoeist
- Ief Verbrugghe (born 1971), Belgian cyclist
- Jacques Verbrugge (born 1955), Dutch cyclist
- Jean Verbrugge (1896–1964), Belgian fencer
- Jules Verbrugge (1886-1921), French footballer
- Magdalenus Verbrugge (active 1969), Canadian politician
- Rik Verbrugghe (born 1974), Belgian road racing cyclist
- Rineke Verbrugge (born 1965), Dutch logician and computer scientist
- Sven Verbrugge (born 1967), Belgian sidecar cross rider
- Willy Albertina Verbrugge (born 1945), Dutch singer and actress known as "Willeke Alberti"

== See also ==
- Van Bruggen (including Van der Brugg(h)en)
