= Bruck =

Bruck may refer to:

== People ==
- Bruck (surname)
- Bruck Dawit, Ethiopian–American musician and producer

== Places ==
Bruck (Bavarian for "bridge") is a common name for towns:

=== Austria ===
- Bruck am Ziller, in the district of Schwaz in Tyrol
- Bruck an der Mur in Styria
- Bruck an der Leitha in Lower Austria
- Bruck an der Großglocknerstraße in the state of Salzburg
- Bruck-Waasen, in the district of Grieskirchen
- Bruck an der Leitha (district), district in Lower Austria

=== Germany ===
- Bruck in der Oberpfalz, in the Schwandorf district of Bavaria
- Bruck, Germany, in the Ebersberg district in southern Bavaria
- Erlangen-Bruck, part of Erlangen in northern Bavaria

== Other uses ==
- Bruck (bus + truck)
- Bruck–Chowla–Ryser theorem

== See also ==
- Brugg (disambiguation)
- Brück
