= Abraham Jacob Bruck =

- Born: 1820; District of Rossienny, Vilna Governorate, Russian Empire
- Died: 1893 (aged 72–73); Yekaterinoslav, Yekaterinoslav Governorate, Russian Empire
- Occupations: Educator, journalist, writer
- Children: Rozalye Bruck
- Writing career
- Pen name: Ha-Aviv (האביב)
- Language: Hebrew, Russian, Yiddish

Abraham Jacob Bruck (Hebrew: אברהם יעקב בן מאיר ברוק) was a Russian educator, journalist, and author of works in Hebrew and in Russian.

== Biography ==
Bruck was born in the district of Rossienny in 1820. He received his education at the Volozhin Yeshiva, but studied Hebrew grammar and the Russian, German, French, and English languages without the aid of a teacher. For many years he was instructor in Hebrew at the government school for Jewish boys in Kherson, and later established a private school for Jewish girls, which the government subsidized. For his zeal as an educator he was awarded a medal by the government.

He contributed extensively to Jewish periodicals, in Hebrew, Russian, and Yiddish. He was for many years a correspondent and writer for Kol Mevasser, and—in the 1880s—for the Yudishen folksblatt in Yekaterinoslav. A Hebrew translation of a French novel which had been published in the Archives israélites was made by him under the title of Ḥatan damim (Lemberg, 1878). The novel portrays the life of the Jews in Russia.

He died in Yekaterinoslav on 18 November 1893.

== Selected publications ==
- Ḥatan damim; o, Ketem ha-dam [Bridegroom of Blood; or, The Bloodstain] (in Hebrew). Lemberg: Buchdruckerei des Szewczenko-Vereines. 1878.
