= Jürgen Brocke =

German fighter ace and Knight's Cross recipient

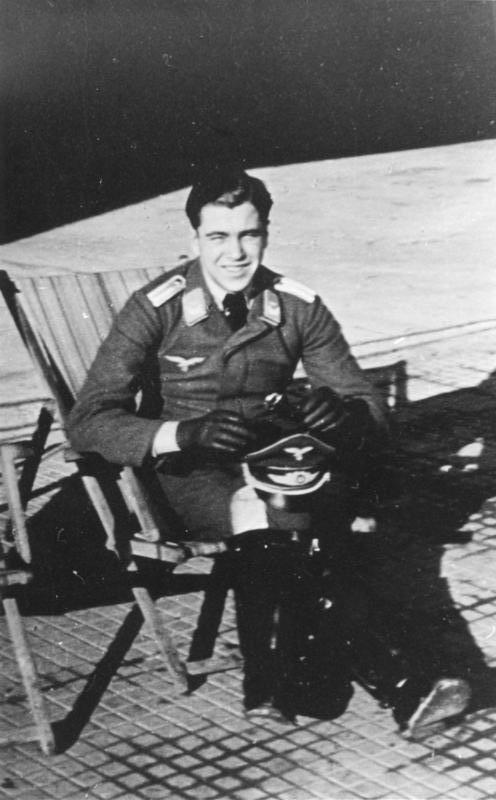
- Brocke as a Leutnant
- Born: 4 February 1922; Bad Harzburg
- Died: 15 September 1942 (aged 20); Voronezh, Russia
- Cause of death: Killed in action
- Military career
- Allegiance: Nazi Germany
- Branch: Luftwaffe
- Service years: 1939–1942
- Rank: Leutnant (second lieutenant)
- Unit: JG 77
- Conflicts: World War II
- Awards: Knight's Cross of the Iron Cross

Jürgen Brocke (4 February 1922 – 15 September 1942) was a German Luftwaffe fighter ace and recipient of the Knight's Cross of the Iron Cross during World War II. Brocke claimed 42 victories in 150 missions. He was shot down on 15 September 1942 and was posthumously awarded the Knight's Cross on 9 December 1942.

== Early life and career ==
Brocke was born on 4 February 1922 in Bad Harzburg in the Free State of Brunswick with the Weimar Republic. Following the outbreak of World War II in Europe on Friday 1 September 1939 when German forces invaded Poland, Brocke joined the Army of the Wehrmacht, initially serving in the artillery. In 1940, he transferred to the Luftwaffe. Following flight training, (Note: Flight training in the Luftwaffe progressed through the levels A1, A2 and B1, B2, referred to as A/B flight training. A training included theoretical and practical training in aerobatics, navigation, long-distance flights and dead-stick landings. The B courses included high-altitude flights, instrument flights, night landings and training to handle the aircraft in difficult situations. For pilots destined to fly multi-engine aircraft, the training was completed with the Luftwaffe Advanced Pilot's Certificate (Erweiterter Luftwaffen-Flugzeugführerschein), also known as the C-Certificate.) Brocke was posted to the 4. Staffel (4th squadron) of Jagdgeschwader 77 (JG 77—77th Fighter Wing) in early 1942. The Staffel was commanded by Oberleutnant Heinrich Setz and subordinated to II. Gruppe of JG 77 headed by Hauptmann Anton Mader. At the time, the Gruppe was stationed at Vienna-Aspern for a period of rest re-equipment with the Messerschmitt Bf 109 F series.

== World War II ==
World War II in Europe had begun on Friday 1 September 1939 when German forces invaded Poland. On 11 March 1942, II. Gruppe began relocating back to the Eastern Front, at first to Proskuriv where it stayed for a few days, and then to Sarabuz on the Crimea, arriving on 17 March 1942. Here, Brocke claimed his first aerial victory on 7 April when he shot down a Polikarpov I-16 fighter. Operating from Sarabuz, he was credited with three further aerial victories, all Polikarpov I-153 fighters claimed on 9, 10 and 22 April. This earned him the Iron Cross 2nd Class (Eisernes Kreuz zweiter Klasse).

On 1 May, II. Gruppe moved to a makeshift airfield named Fernheim located near Sovietskyi on the southern coast of the Sea of Azov. Here on 13 May, Brocke claimed an aerial victory during Operation Trappenjagd in the Battle of the Kerch Peninsula. Two days later, the air elements of the Gruppe moved to an airfield at Baherove. Here Brocke claimed two Yakovlev Yak-1 fighters shot down, one on 16 and 21 May respectively. The Gruppe then briefly returned to Sarabuz before relocating to an airfield named Oktoberfeld, now Oktyabrskoye air base on 28 May. Here, Brocke claimed a Lavochkin-Gorbunov-Gudkov LaGG-3 fighter on 12 June and an I-16 fighter two days later. On 5 July, II. Gruppe moved to an airfield Kastornoje, approximately 75 kilometers (47 miles) west of Voronezh, where it fought in the Battle of Voronezh. Here Brocke claimed eight further aerial victories, taking his total to 17 on 24 July.

=== Combat in the Caucasus and death ===
In late July, Army Group A launched Operation Edelweiß, an attempt to gain control over the Caucasus and capture the oil fields of Baku, initiating the Battle of the Caucasus. In support of this operation, Brocke claimed three Petlyakov Pe-2 bombers shot down on 26 July. In August, Brocke claimed nine aerial victories, including three on 13 August and two the following day. On 5 September, he again claimed three aerial victories, taking his total to 35 aerial victories claimed.

On 9 September, II. Gruppe moved to Stary Oskol. Here on 12 September, Brocke was awarded the Honor Goblet of the Luftwaffe (Ehrenpokal der Luftwaffe). Three days later from 09:55 to 11:05, 4. Staffel flew a combat air patrol in the area southwest of Voronezh. There, they encountered Soviet bomber, close air support and fighter aircraft. In this encounter, Brocke claimed four aerial victories. He was then shot down and killed in action by anti-aircraft artillery in his Bf 109 F-2 (Werknummer 7623—factory number) southwest of Devitsa, located approximately 15 kilometers (9.3 miles) west of Voronezh. The day after his death, his commanding officer Heinrich Setz noted that Brocke had been the best officer in the Staffel. A few days later, Brocke's father Alfred Brocke, an Oberstleutnant in the Luftwaffe, visited 4. Staffel at Stary Oskol. Posthumously, Brocke was awarded the German Cross in Gold (Deutsches Kreuz in Gold) on 8 October and the Knight's Cross of the Iron Cross (Ritterkreuz des Eisernen Kreuzes) on 9 December 1942.

== Summary of career ==
=== Aerial victory claims ===
According to Obermaier, Brocke was credited with 42 aerial victories claimed in approximately 150 combat mission on the Eastern Front. Spick also lists him with 42 aerial victories and a mission-to-claim ratio of 3.57. Mathews and Foreman, authors of Luftwaffe Aces — Biographies and Victory Claims, researched the German Federal Archives and found records for 39 aerial victory claims, all of which claimed over the Eastern Front.

Victory claims were logged to a map-reference (PQ = Planquadrat), for example "PQ 82133". The Luftwaffe grid map (Jägermeldenetz) covered all of Europe, western Russia and North Africa and was composed of rectangles measuring 15 minutes of latitude by 30 minutes of longitude, an area of about 360 square miles (930 km^{2}). These sectors were then subdivided into 36 smaller units to give a location area 3 km × 4 km (1.9 mi × 2.5 mi) in size.

Chronicle of aerial victories
This and the ? (question mark) indicates information discrepancies listed by Prien, Stemmer, Rodeike, Bock, Mathews and Foreman.
Claim	Date	Time	Type	Location	Claim	Date	Time	Type	Location
– 4. Staffel of Jagdgeschwader 77 – Eastern Front — 17 March – 30 April 1942
1	7 April 1942	11:00	I-16	Kerch	3	10 April 1942	10:20	I-153	
2	9 April 1942	15:50	I-153		4	22 April 1942	16:55	I-153	
– 4. Staffel of Jagdgeschwader 77 – Eastern Front — 1 May – 15 September 1942
5	13 May 1942	07:56	I-180 (Yak-7)		24	6 August 1942	18:09	Boston	PQ 82133; 60 km (37 mi) northwest of Voronezh
6	16 May 1942	09:40	Yak-1		25	9 August 1942	18:54	LaGG-3	PQ 92184; 15 km (9.3 mi) north of Voronezh
7	21 May 1942	17:50	Yak-1	PQ 35383	26	12 August 1942	14:48	LaGG-3	PQ 83674; 60 km (37 mi) south-southwest of Yelets
8	12 June 1942	12:03	LaGG-3		27	13 August 1942	06:12	Yak-1	PQ 92163; 25 km (16 mi) northeast of Voronezh
9	14 June 1942	14:53	I-16		28	13 August 1942	18:20	LaGG-3	PQ 93714; 50 km (31 mi) north of Voronezh
10	10 July 1942	03:45	Yak-1		29	13 August 1942	18:22	LaGG-3	PQ 92112; 30 km (19 mi) north-northwest of Voronezh
11	11 July 1942	05:32	LaGG-3		30? (Note: This claim is not listed by Mathews and Foreman.)	14 August 1942	09:18	Pe-2	
12	14 July 1942	06:47	P-39		31?	14 August 1942	09:28	Pe-2	
13	14 July 1942	19:33	DB-3		32	17 August 1942	04:18	Boston	PQ 92312 vicinity of Devitsa
14	16 July 1942	13:15	LaGG-3		33	5 September 1942	17:17	Il-2	PQ 82162; 55 km (34 mi) northwest of Voronezh
15	18 July 1942	18:36	Yak-1		34	5 September 1942	17:22	LaGG-3	PQ 83851; 60 km (37 mi) north-northwest of Voronezh
16	21 July 1942	15:00	P-40		35	5 September 1942	17:28	Il-2	PQ 83822; 50 km (31 mi) south-southeast of Yelets
17	24 July 1942	18:41	LaGG-3		36	13 September 1942	10:18	Il-2	PQ 92731; 25 km (16 mi) north-northwest of Sloboda
18	26 July 1942	17:52	Pe-2		37	13 September 1942	10:24	Hurricane	PQ 92644; 45 km (28 mi) north of Sloboda
19	26 July 1942	17:54	Pe-2		38	15 September 1942	10:30	Il-2	PQ 92192 vicinity of Devitsa
20	26 July 1942	18:02	Pe-2		39	15 September 1942	10:39	Pe-2	PQ 92383 vicinity of Devitsa
21	27 July 1942	11:39	LaGG-3		40	15 September 1942	10:40	Pe-2	PQ 92384 vicinity of Devitsa
22	28 July 1942	07:42	Il-2	PQ 83872; 60 km (37 mi) northwest of Voronezh	41	15 September 1942	10:41	Pe-2	PQ 92512 vicinity of Devitsa
23	28 July 1942	18:58	LaGG-3	PQ 93783; 50 km (31 mi) north of Voronezh					

=== Awards ===
- Iron Cross (1939) 2nd and 1st Class
- Honor Goblet of the Luftwaffe on 13 September 1942 as Leutnant and pilot (Note: According to Obermaier on 6 September 1942.)
- German Cross in Gold on 8 October 1942 as Leutnant in the II/Jagdgeschwader 77
- Knight's Cross of the Iron Cross on 9 December 1942 as Leutnant and pilot in the 4./Jagdgeschwader 77
