= Tilburg University =

University in the Netherlands

Coordinates: 51°33′46″N 5°2′31″E

- Motto in English: Understanding Society
- Type: Special
- Established: 1927
- Affiliations: EUA / AACSB / VSNU / TPC
- Religious affiliation: Roman Catholic
- Rector Magnificus: Wim van de Donk
- Total staff: 3,096 FTE (2024)
- Students: 19,168 (2024)
- Location: Warandelaan 2, Tilburg, Tilburg, Netherlands
- Campus: Urban
- School newspaper: Univers
- Colours: Blue and Bronze
- Website: www.tilburguniversity.edu

Tilburg University is a Catholic research university specializing in the social and behavioral sciences, economics, law, business sciences, theology and humanities, located in Tilburg, Netherlands.

Tilburg has a student population of about 19,150 students. Tilburg University has 67 Bachelors & Master's programs. Tilburg University has a PhD population of about 1,000 PhDs and awards approximately 99 PhDs per year. In 2024, the university had over 97,000 alumni. The university has over 3,000 FTE staff members, of which 57% are academic staff.

== History ==
Tilburg University was founded in 1927, as the Roomsch Katholieke Handelshoogeschool (Roman Catholic University of Commerce), in the southern, Catholic part of the Netherlands, visible in its second change of name in 1938: Katholieke Economische Hogeschool (Catholic Economic University). In 1963 the university was once again renamed, as Katholieke Hogeschool Tilburg (Catholic University Tilburg), followed by a name change to Katholieke Universiteit Brabant (Catholic University Brabant). Although in its present name Tilburg University, the word Catholic was dropped, the university is still regarded as a Catholic university.

=== 1969 protests ===
1969 KHT protests

On 28 April 1969, students barricaded the campus buildings, demanding educational and organizational changes. Months before students had unofficially renamed the university Karl Marx Universiteit (English: Karl Marx University), painting this title across campus to accentuate the importance of Marxist ideas in the then primarily economics-oriented curriculum. These protests led to a widespread change in higher education across the Netherlands that was made official by the 1971 bill of Educational Reform, granting more joint decision making to students of Dutch universities.

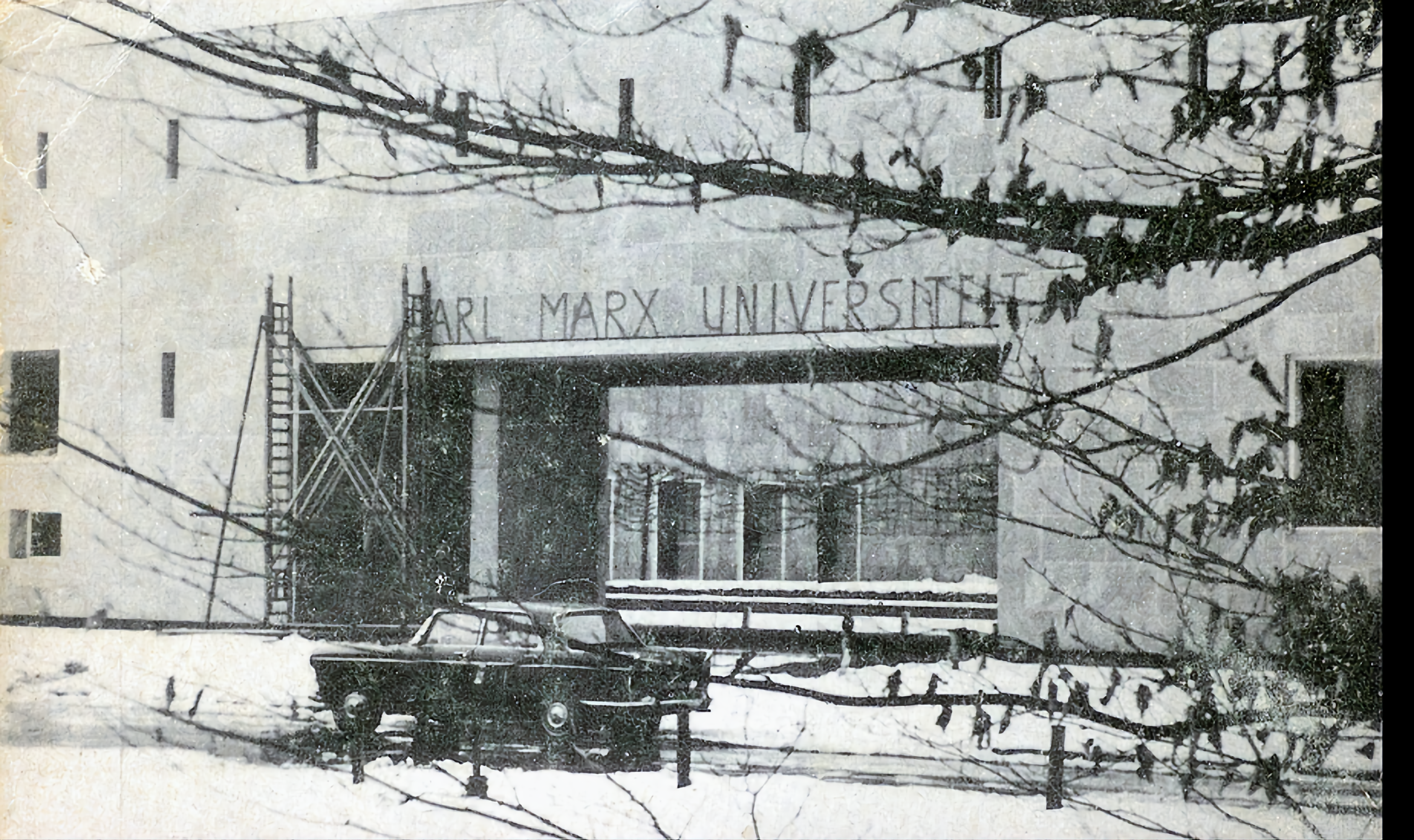
An entrance to the university that had Karl Marx Universiteit painted above it as an action for the "democratization of the university"

== Rankings ==
University rankings

Global – Overall
- ARWU World: 701-800 (2024)
- CWUR World: 696 (2024)
- CWTS World: 197 (2024)
- QS World: =347 (2026)
- THE World: 251-300 (2025)
- USNWR Global: =631 (2024-25)

Tilburg University is a specialised university and has a focus on Social Sciences and Economics. In 2020 three major university rankings (QS World University Ranking, THE World University Rankings and US News Best Global Universities) listed Tilburg among the top 40 in the world and top 10 in Europe for Economics.

In 2020, Tilburg University was ranked 17th worldwide and 4th in Europe in Economics & Business field, by the US News 2020 ranking. Times Higher Education in 2019 ranked it 28th in Economics & Business and 28th in Law globally in the 2021 ranking. The Shanghai Ranking lists Tilburg as the 5th best university in Business Administration in the world, 12th in Finance and 27th in Management.

== Education and research ==
Tilburg University has 73 Bachelors & Masters programs, of which 43 in English.

=== Schools ===
Tilburg University has five Schools:

- Tilburg School of Economics and Management (TiSEM)
- Tilburg Law School (TLS)
- Tilburg School of Social and Behavioral Sciences (TSB)
- Tilburg School of Humanities and Digital Sciences (TSHD)
- Tilburg School of Catholic Theology (TST)

The Tilburg School of Economics and Management (founded in 1927) is the oldest and largest faculty of the university. The other four faculties—Law (1963), Social and Behavioral Sciences (1963), Philosophy and Theology (1967), Arts (1981)—were founded more recently. In addition to these faculties, Tilburg University has a number of research centers and graduate schools (see below).

Student life takes place at several study and student (sports) associations.

=== Liberal Arts and Sciences ===
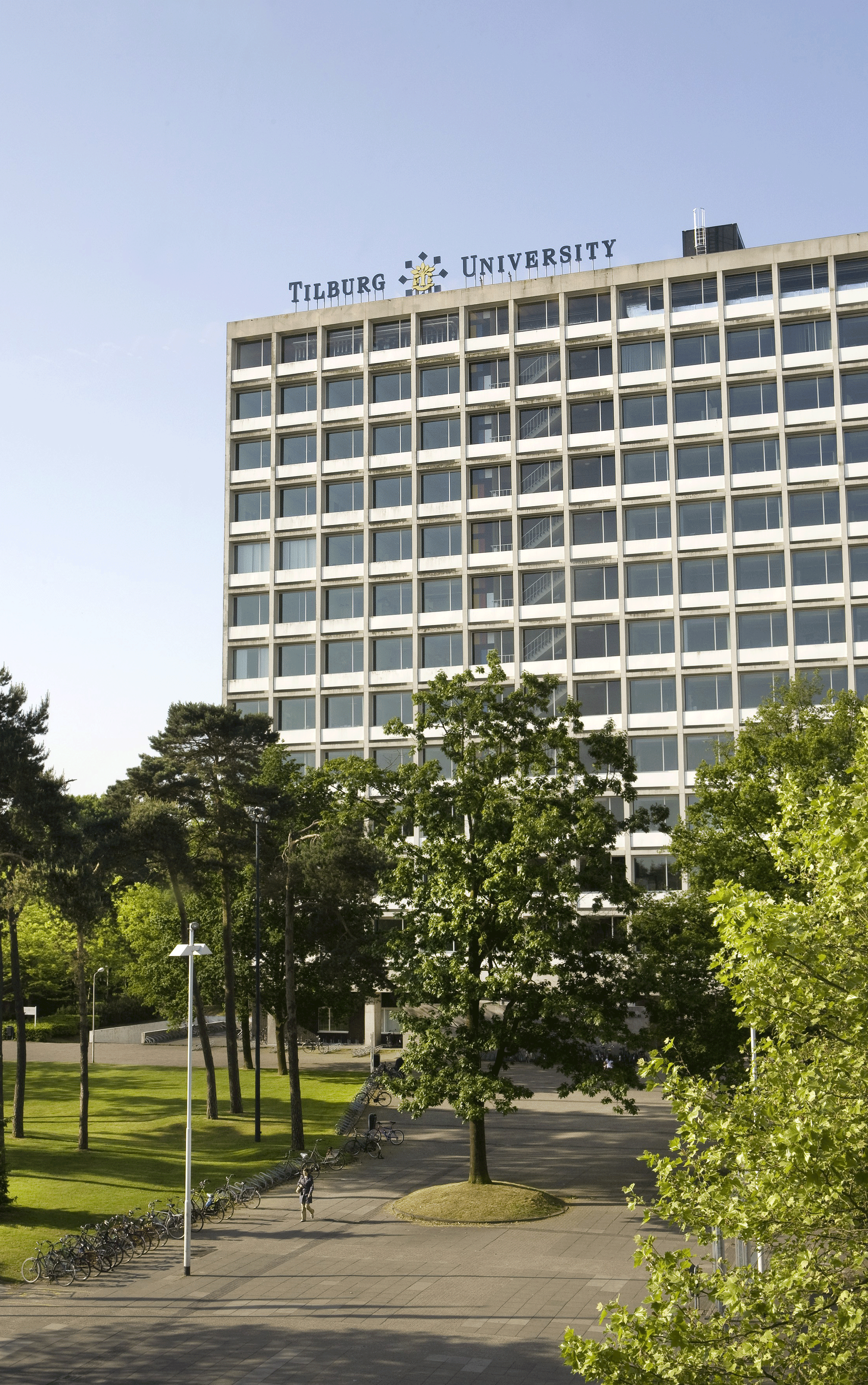
Campus

University College Tilburg is the liberal arts and sciences college of Tilburg University. It offers a small-scale, interdisciplinary bachelor's program where students can design their own academic path across the humanities, social sciences, and cognitive sciences. The program emphasizes critical thinking, academic skills, and societal engagement, and leads to a Bachelor of Arts or Bachelor of Science degree, depending on the chosen specialization.

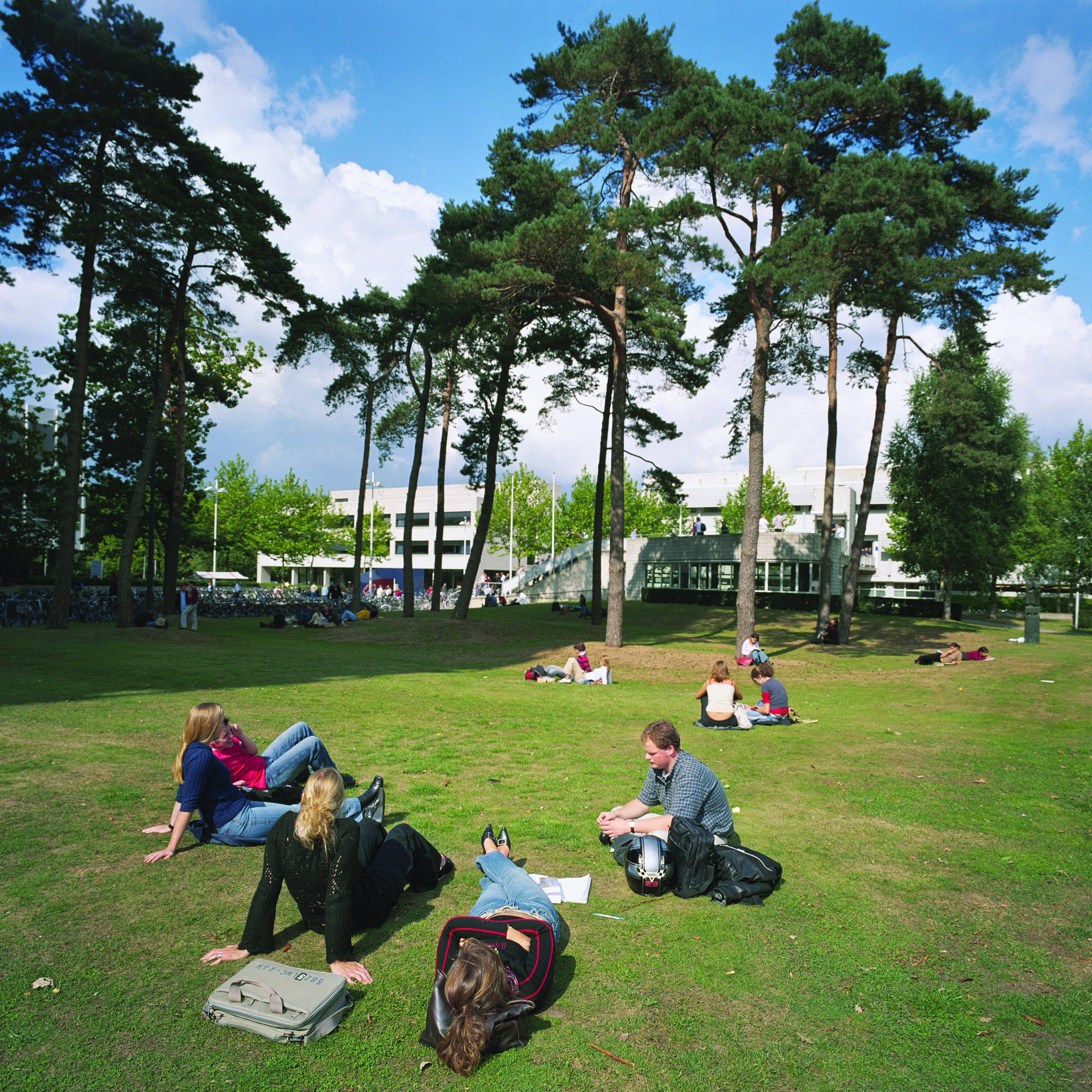
Tilburg University campus

== Notable alumni and faculty members ==
- Wim de Bie – writer, satirist, comedian
- Lans Bovenberg – economist
- Wim van de Donk – politician
- Afshin Ellian – professor of law, philosopher, poet, critic of Islam
- Max Euwe – chess Grandmaster, mathematician, former President of FIDE
- Jackie Groenen - footballer
- Ernst Hirsch Ballin – former Dutch Minister of Justice
- Geert Hofstede – social psychologist, anthropologist (see Hofstede's cultural dimensions theory)
- Servais Knaven – cyclist
- Ruud Lubbers – former Prime Minister of the Netherlands, United Nations High Commissioner for Refugees (2001–2005)
- Paul Scheffer
- Norbert Schmelzer – former Dutch Minister of Foreign Affairs
- Diederik Stapel – founder of the Tilburg Institute for Behavioral Economics Research, later dismissed for fabricating data.
- Max van der Stoel – politician, first High Commissioner of Organization for Security and Co-operation in Europe
- Cees Veerman – former Dutch Minister of Agriculture
- Jan Vranken - Professor of law
- Herman Wijffels – economist and politician
- Willem Witteveen – legal scholar, politician, and author
- Joseph A. McCahery – corporate lawyers, researcher and institutional adviser
- Ralph Hamers – businessman, the chief executive officer (CEO) of ING Group since October 2013
- Jacques van den Broek - CEO of Randstad NV since March 2014
