= Brügger (surname) =

Brügger or Brugger is a German surname. Notable people with the surname include:

- Agnieszka Brugger (born 1985), German politician
- Arnold Brügger (1888–1975), Swiss painter
- Christian Georg Brügger (1833–1899), Swiss botanist and naturalist
- Christina Gilli-Brügger (born 1956), Swiss cross country skier
- Ernst Brugger (1914–1998), Swiss politician and member of the Swiss Federal Council (1969–1978)
- Frank Brugger (1927–2000), New Zealand businessman
- Friedrich Brugger (1815–1870), German sculptor
- Hazel Brugger (born 1993), Swiss-American comedian and television presenter
- Janai Brugger (born 1983), American opera singer
- Janosch Brugger (born 1997), German cross-country skier
- Juergen Brugger, Swiss engineer
- Karl Brugger (1941–1984), German foreign correspondent and author
- Kenneth C. Brugger (1918–1998), naturalist
- Kurt Brugger (born 1969), Italian luger
- Mads Brügger (born 1972), Danish filmmaker and TV host
- Marc Brügger, Swiss curler and coach
- Mathias Brugger (born 1992), German track and field athlete
- Michael Meier-Brügger (born 1948), Swiss linguist and Indo-Europeanist
- Nathalie Brugger (born 1985), Swiss sailor
- Peter Brugger (born 1972), singer of the band Sportfreunde Stiller
- Remo Brügger (born 1960), Swiss footballer
- Simon Brügger (born 1975), Swiss sailor
- Ulrich Brugger (born 1947), retired West German long-distance runner
- Winfried Brugger (born 1950), Professor of Public Law, Philosophy of Law and Theory of State at Heidelberg University

== See also ==
- Bruch/Von dem Bruch/Vom Bruch, Bruche, Bruck/Brück/Brueck, von Bruck, Bruk
- Brucke/Brücke, Brücker, Brückner, Brückl
- Brog, Brugge/Brügge, Brüggen/Van Bruggen, van Brug, Brøgger/Brügger, Tebrügge, Bruegge
- Brock/Broeck, Brocke, Broek, Broekx, Broke, Broucke, Ten Broeck, Ten Broek, Ten Broeke, Ten Brook, Van den Broek/Van den Broeck, Van den Broecke, Vandenbroucke
