= Bruch =

Bruch may refer to:

- Bruch (surname)
- Bruch, Lot-et-Garonne, a commune in the Lot-et-Garonne département, France
- Bruch, Rhineland-Palatinate, a municipality in the district Bernkastel-Wittlich, Rhineland-Palatinate, Germany
- the old German names of Lom (Strakonice District) and Lom u Mostu in the Czech Republic
- the old German name of Bruk, Pomeranian Voivodeship, in northern Poland
- 5004 Bruch, an asteroid

== See also ==
- Bruch's membrane, the innermost layer of the choroid in the eye
