= Brookner =

Brookner is a surname. Notable people with the surname include:

- Aaron Brookner (born 1981), American film director and screenwriter
- Anita Brookner (1928–2016), British writer and art historian
- Howard Brookner (1954–1989), American film director
- Jackie Brookner (1945–2015), American artist
- Janine Brookner (1940–2021), American lawyer and Central Intelligence Agency officer

== See also ==
- Bruckner
