= Hans Bruggeman =

Dutch politician (1927–2016)

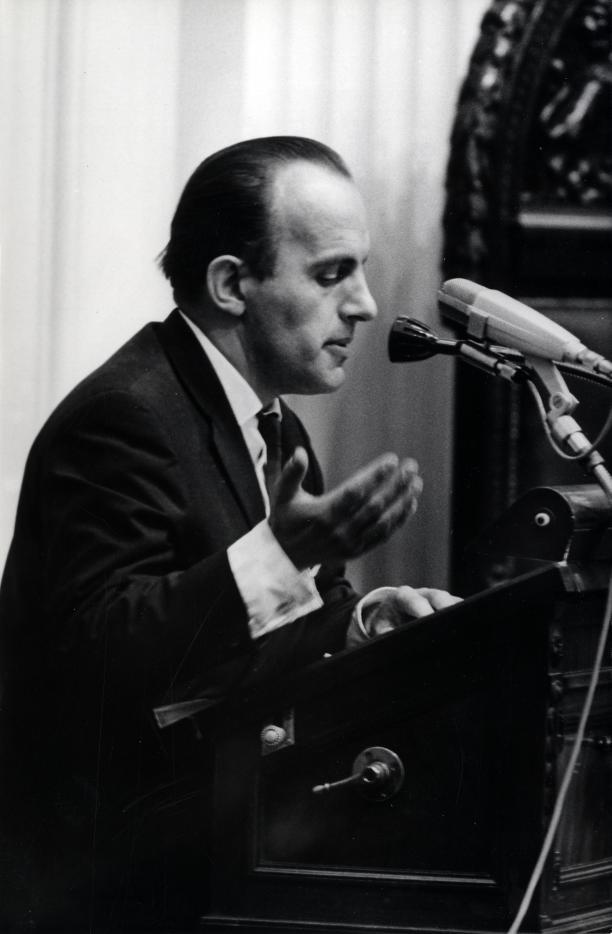
- Bruggeman in 1966

Member of the House of Representatives
- In office 5 June 1963 – 22 February 1967

Member of the municipal council of Amsterdam
- In office 4 September 1962 – 1 November 1968

Personal details
- Born: 21 May 1927 Voorburg, Netherlands
- Died: 15 October 2016 (aged 89) Amsterdam, Netherlands
- Party: Pacifist Socialist Party

Anthonius Johannes "Hans" Bruggeman (21 May 1927 – 15 October 2016) was a Dutch politician. He served in the House of Representatives for the Pacifist Socialist Party from 5 June 1963 until 22 February 1967.

== Career ==
Bruggeman was born in Voorburg on 21 May 1927. He attended the gymnasium and subsequently finished an education in graphology. He also pursued an academic degree in philosophy between 1957 and 1962, but did not obtain a degree. Bruggeman worked for the Escomptobank and later worked as a civil servant for the Rijksgebouwendienst. After his time in politics Bruggeman worked for the Voorzieningenfonds voor Kunstenaar and later was director of the Volksuniversiteit Amsterdam. He retired in 1989 and became a full-time volunteer at Amnesty International in Amsterdam.

Politically, Bruggeman represented the Pacifist Socialist Party in the municipal council of Amsterdam from 4 September 1962 to 1 November 1968. He was elected in the 1963 general election to the House of Representatives and served there from 5 June 1963 to 22 February 1967. Bruggeman was number seven on the PSP list for the 1967 Dutch general election, but was not elected.

Bruggeman was a livelong activist. He was known as one of the first anti–nuclear weapons activists of the Netherlands and served as chairperson of the Comité 1961 voor de Vrede from 1960 to 1963.

He died in Amsterdam on 15 October 2016.
