= Broek, Gouda =

Coordinates: 52°0′58″N 4°40′27″E

Broek was a municipality in the Dutch province of South Holland, located west and north of Gouda. A longer name of the municipality, Broek, Bloemendaal, Broekhuizen, Thuil en het Weegje names the polders that are part of the municipality.

Broek was a separate municipality between 1817 and 1870, when it became part of Waddinxveen. The polder "Broek" is now part of the municipality of Gouda, as is part of Bloemendaal. Around 1850, the municipality had a population of more than 1300, on an area of 17.55 km^{2}.,
