= Broek, Vijfheerenlanden =

Broek
- Hamlet
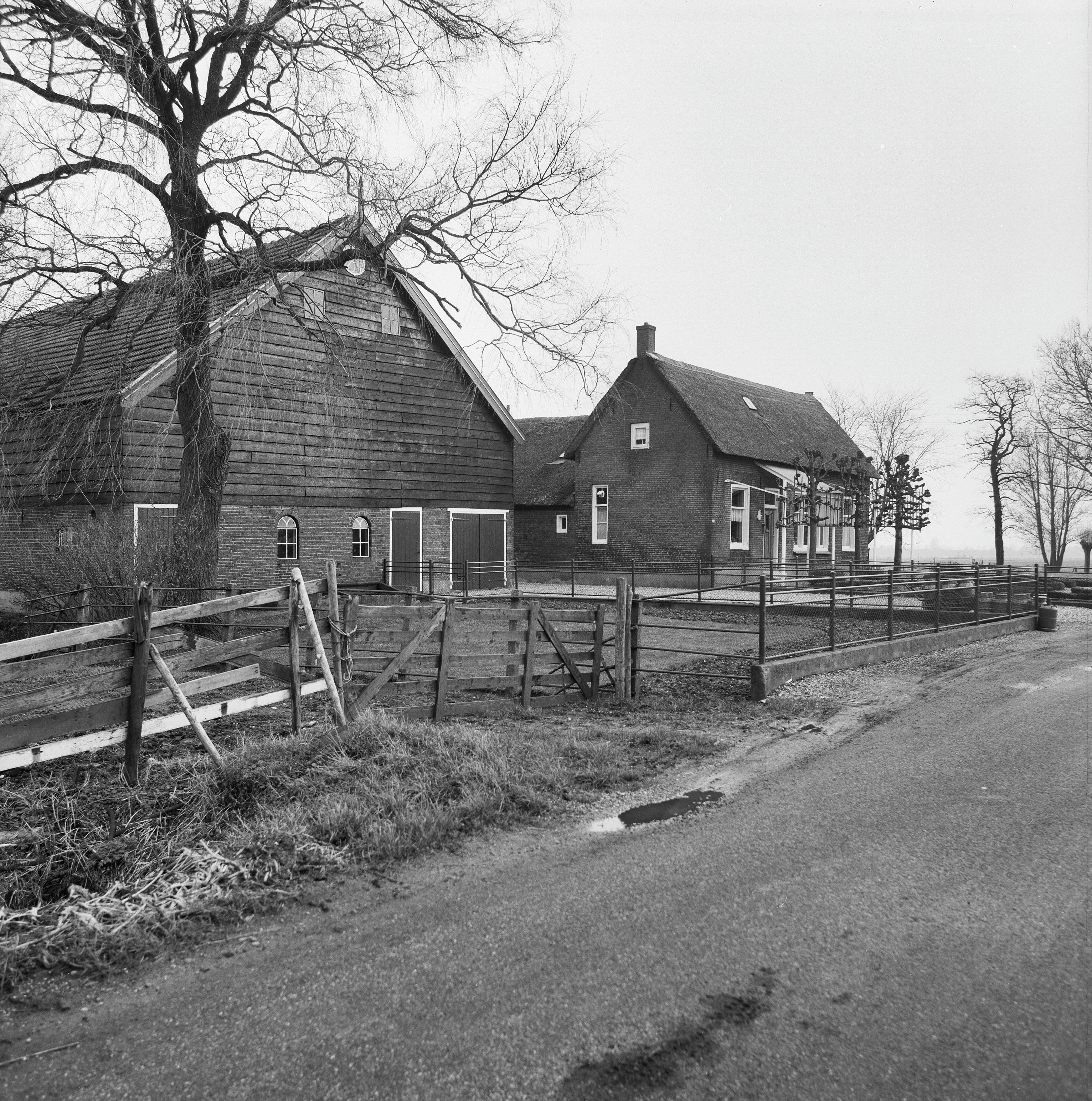
- Farm in Broek

- Location in the Netherlands Broek (Netherlands)
- Coordinates: 51.9327°N 4.9677°E
- Country: Netherlands
- Province: Utrecht
- Municipality: Vijfheerenlanden

Area
  - Total: 10.18 km^{2} (3.93 sq mi)

Population (2021)
  - Total: 425
  - Density: 41.7/km^{2} (108/sq mi)
- Time zone: UTC+1 (CET)
  - Summer (DST): UTC+2 (CEST)
- Postal code: 4231
- Dialing code: 0183

Broek is a hamlet in the Dutch province of Utrecht. It is a part of the municipality of Vijfheerenlanden, and lies about 11 km north of Gorinchem.

Broek has no place name signs, and the postal authorities have placed it under Meerkerk. In 1840, it was home to 293 people. A part of the hamlet has been placed under Ameide and consists of about 10 houses.
