= Gene Brucker =

American historian and academic

Gene Adam Brucker
- Born: October 15, 1924; Cropsey, Illinois, U.S.
- Died: July 9, 2017 (aged 92); Emeryville, California, U.S.
- Occupation: Historian
- Known for: Research on Florence during the Renaissance
- Title: Shepard Professor of History, Emeritus
- Awards: Rhodes Scholarship; Fulbright Fellowship; Guggenheim Fellowship; National Endowment for the Humanities Fellowship

Academic background
- Education: Princeton University (Ph.D. 1954)

Academic work
- Discipline: History, Literature
- Sub-discipline: Renaissance history, Florentine studies
- Institutions: University of California, Berkeley
- Notable works: Renaissance Florence (1983); Florence: the Golden Age (1998); Living on the Edge in Leonardo's Florence: Selected Essays

Notes
- Elected to the American Academy of Arts and Sciences (1979)

Gene Adam Brucker (October 15, 1924 – July 9, 2017) was an American historian and the Shepard Professor of History, Emeritus at the University of California, Berkeley. Brucker was born and grew up in his family farm in Cropsey, Illinois. He studied at attended the University of Illinois at Champaign-Urbana where he pursued a BA. At Champaign-Urbana, he was influenced by Raymond Stears, a Professor of modern European history. In 1943, Brucker was interrupted by World War II in which he served in the Army Corps of Engineers in France. He later studied at Oxford and received his Ph.D. from Princeton University in 1954. He was immediately appointed to the faculty at Berkeley. He received several academic awards, including the Rhodes Scholarship, Fulbright Fellowship, Guggenheim Fellowship, and the National Endowment for the Humanities Fellowship. In 1979, he was elected to the American Academy of Arts and Sciences.

Brucker has focused and written specifically on Florence during the Renaissance. His research on Florentine history has pursued new insights into the period. Among his works include "Renaissance Florence" (1983), "Florence: the Golden Age" (1998), and "Living on the Edge in Leonardo's Florence: Selected Essays."
