= Devitsa =

Devitsa Девица
- Selo
- Location within Voronezh Oblast Location within Russia
- Coordinates: 51°04′N 39°07′E
- Country: Russia
- Region: Voronezh Oblast
- District: Ostrogozhsky District
- Time zone: UTC+3:00

Devitsa (Russian: Девица) is a rural locality (a selo) and the administrative center of Devitskoye Rural Settlement, Ostrogozhsky District, Voronezh Oblast, Russia. The population was 822 as of 2010. There are 15 streets.

== Geography ==
Devitsa is located 43 km north of Ostrogozhsk (the district's administrative centre) by road. Uryv-Pokrovka is the nearest rural locality.
