= Wilhelm Brücke =

German painter (1800–1874)

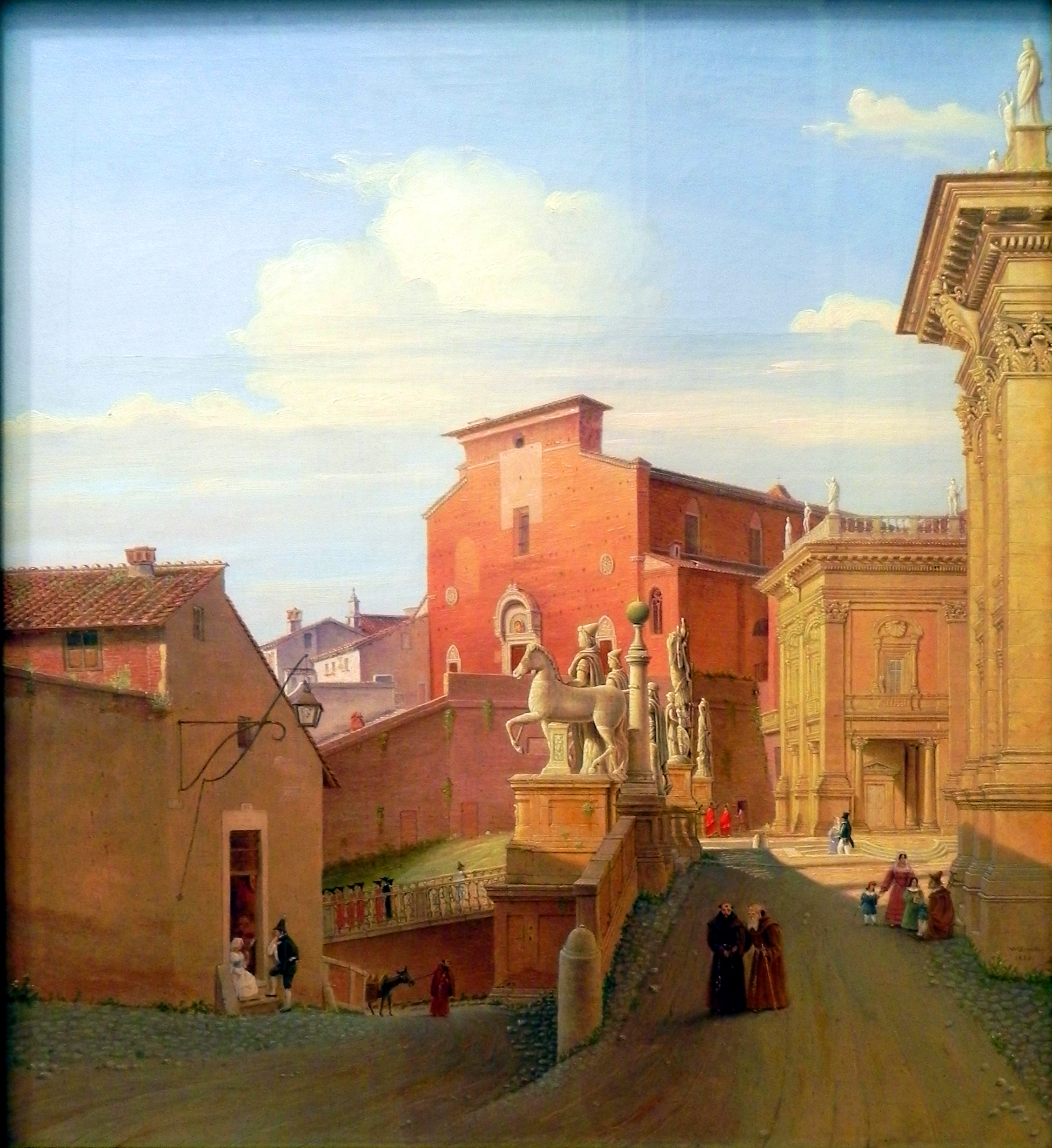
View of the Capitol in Rome (1835)

Johann Wilhelm Brücke (4 March 1800 – 1 April 1874) was a German landscape and architecture painter.

== Life ==
He was born in Stralsund. After completing school in Stralsund, he enrolled at the Prussian Academy of Arts where he studied under Johann Erdmann Hummel. With the financial support of his teacher and a small grant, he went to Rome in 1829. He remained there for almost five years, producing landscapes and vedute of Roman architecture. Upon his return to Berlin, he set himself up as a free-lance artist and regularly took part in major exhibitions at the Academy.

He found his own style early on and his work is easily recognizable from his use of reddish, sunset colors. However, some of his later paintings are reminiscent of the almost photographically realistic work of Eduard Gaertner.

Brücke died in Berlin on 1874. His popularity continued after his death, and his works formed part of a major exhibit at the "Jahrhundertausstellung Deutscher Kunst" (Centennial Exhibition of German Art) in 1906.

== Sources and further reading ==
- Gerhard Hansen: Wilhelm Brücke. Galerie unter den Linden, Berlin 1851. (Exhibition catalog)
- Irmgard Wirth: Berliner Malerei im 19. Jahrhundert. Siedler Verlag, Berlin 1990, ISBN 3-572-10011-9, pg, 195.
- Berlin Museum - Stadtbilder. Nicolaische Verlagsbuchhandlung and Verlag Willmuth Arenhövel, Berlin 1987, ISBN 3-87584-212-X, pg. 537.
