= Jan Vandenbroucke =

Belgian epidemiologist and physician (born 1950)

Jan Vandenbroucke (2021)

Jan Paul Vandenbroucke (born March 8, 1950, in Leuven, Belgium) is a Belgian epidemiologist and physician known for his work in clinical epidemiology. Trained as an internist, he began teaching at Leiden University Medical Center in 1987, and was the head of their Clinical Epidemiology department from then until 1999. He is a member of Academia Europaea and the Royal Netherlands Academy of Arts and Sciences since 1996. In 2006, he was named an Academy Professor by the Royal Netherlands Academy of Arts and Sciences.
