= Ludwig Bruck =

Australian medical practitioner and medical journalist

Ludwig Bruck was an Australian medical practitioner and medical journalist. He was the compiler of the first five editions of the Australasian Medical Directory and Handbook between 1883 and 1900. He committed suicide on 14 August 1915 after being accused of trading with the enemy.
