= Philipp Bruck =

German politician (born 1989)

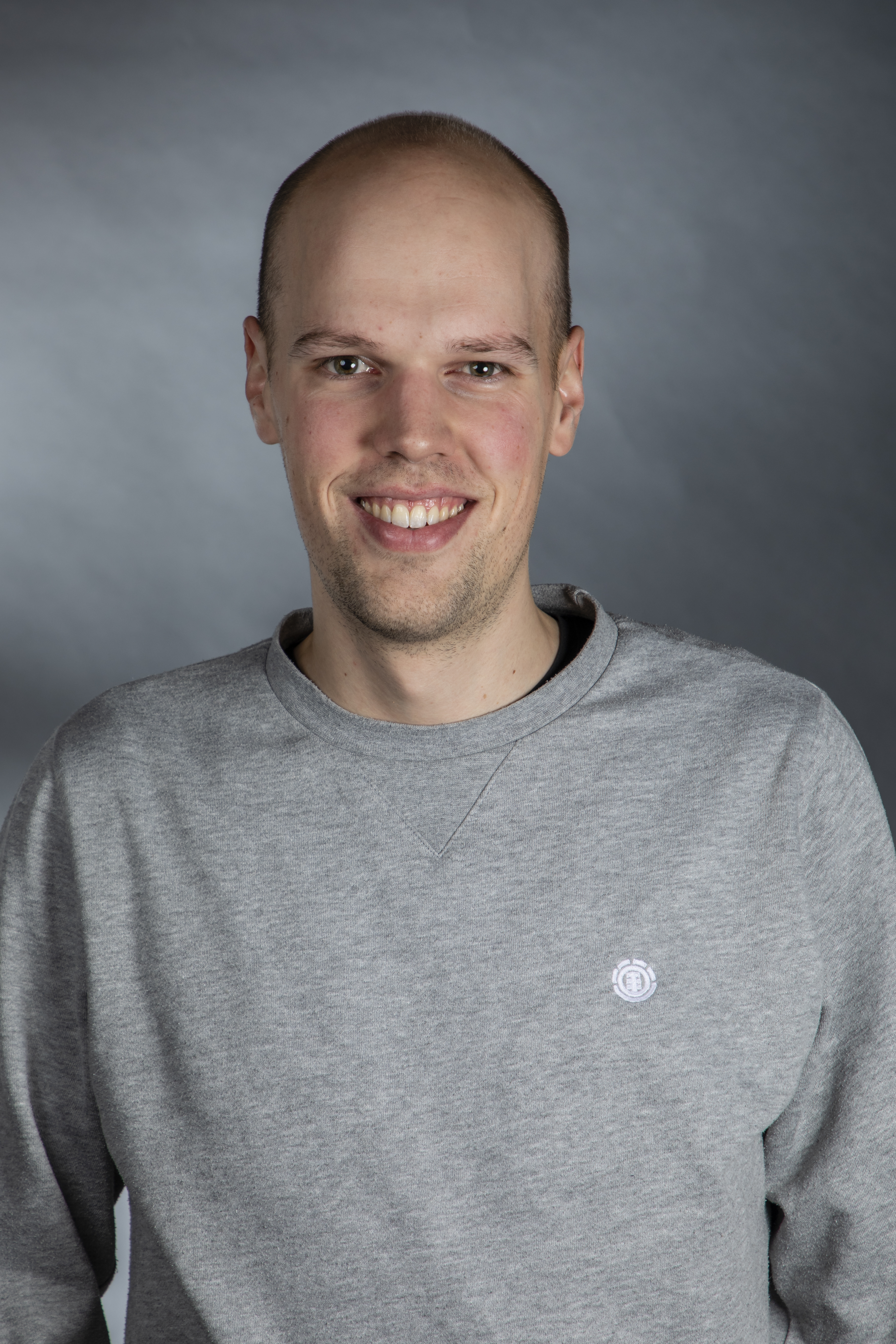
- Bruck in 2019

Member of the Bürgerschaft of Bremen
- Incumbent
- Assumed office 8 June 2019

Personal details
- Born: 1989 (age 36–37)
- Party: Alliance 90/The Greens

Philipp Bruck (born 1989) is a German politician serving as a member of the Bürgerschaft of Bremen since 2019. From 2023 to 2025, he served as deputy group leader of Alliance 90/The Greens. From 2011 to 2012, he served as spokesperson of the Green Youth in Bremen.
