= Juergen Brugger =

Swiss engineer

Juergen Brugger from the EPFL - École Polytechnique Fédérale de Lausanne, Switzerland was named Fellow of the Institute of Electrical and Electronics Engineers (IEEE) in 2016 for contributions to micro and nano manufacturing technology.
