= Martin vom Brocke =

Swedish dentist and author

- Born: 25 July 1969 (age 56); Solothurn, Switzerland.
- Education: University of Bern, Danube University Krems
- Years active: 19
- Medical career
- Profession: Dentist
- Sub-specialties: Orthodontics
- Research: Orthodontics, Cephalometric analysis

Martin vom Brocke (born 25 July 1969) is a Swiss dentist, orthodontist and book author.

== Life and scientific work ==
Vom Brocke studied dentistry at University of Bern from 1992 to 1997, and finished his doctoral theses (Ph.D.) in 2000. In 2013 he achieved a degree as Master of Science in Orthodontics at Danube University Krems (Prof. Dr. Dr. Dieter Müßig). Since 2010 he does research work on the long-known problems and insufficiencies of Edward Angle's classification system of malocclusions (published in 1899), on cephalometric analysis and on related topics.

In 2015 he proposed a new dental classification system that integrates the position of the ears, the chin, the nose, the eyes, tooth sizes, the occlusion and the second dentition, the structural relations between these parameters being described by Riemann's ζ4 function. Like Angle's system, vom Brocke's classification is primarily based on the positional relationship of the first small molar teeth (premolars).

== Publications ==
- Struction - The Harmonious Theory of Relativity. Inspiration Un Limited, London/Berlin 2015, 126 p., ISBN 978-3-945127-04-9
- Strukturieren - Fördert strukturiertes Lernen des Studienerfolg?. Inspiration Un Limited, London/Berlin 2016, ISBN 978-3-945127-06-3
- Strukturiert - Wie lassen sich mit DVT orale Strukturen vergleichen? [Master Theses of 2013]. Inspiration Un Limited, London/Berlin 2016, 130 p., ISBN 978-3-945127-07-0
- Struktur - Warum sehen unsere Köpfe nicht aus wie Steine?. Inspiration Un Limited, London/Berlin 2016, ISBN 978-3-9451270-8-7
- Zahnorthopädie - Harmonische Anpassung fordert neues zahnmedizinisches Vorgehen. Inspiration Un Limited, London/Berlin 2016, ISBN 978-3-945127-09-4
- Zahnorthopädie - Eine neue Referenz in der Orthodontie und dento-fazialen Orthopädie. Inspiration Un Limited, London/Berlin 2016, ISBN 978-3-945127-11-7 (= 2nd edition of ISBN 978-3-945127-09-4)
- Tooth Orthopaedia - A new Reference in Orthodontics and Dentofacial Orthopedics. Inspiration Un Limited, London/Berlin 2016, 136 p., ISBN 978-3-945127-12-4
- Zahnorthopädie - Eine neue Referenz in der Orthodontie und dento-fazialen Orthopädie. Inspiration Un Limited, London/Berlin 2017, ISBN 978-3-945127-13-1 (= e-book edition of ISBN 978-3-945127-12-4)
- Scientific Basis of the Structural Gravitation Theory. Inspiration Un Limited, London/Berlin 2022, ISBN 978-3-945127-13-1 (= e-book edition of ISBN 978-3-945127-38-4)
