= Van den Broek =

Van den Broek is a Dutch toponymic surname, meaning "from the marshes". Variant spellings include Van den Broeck, Van den Broeke, and Vandebroek. People with this surname include:

- Antonius van den Broek (1870–1926), Dutch lawyer and physicist known for defining the atomic number
- Barbara van den Broek (1932–2001), New Zealand-born Australian architect and landscape architect
- Benjamin van den Broek (born 1987), New Zealand footballer
- Dirk van den Broek (1924–2020), Dutch businessman
- Elias van den Broek (1649–1708), Dutch Golden Age flower painter
- Hans van den Broek (1936–2025), Dutch Minister of Foreign Affairs
- Irene van den Broek (born 1980), Dutch cyclist
- Jacques van den Broek (born 1960), Dutch businessman, CEO of Randstad Holding
- Jan Karel van den Broek (1814–1865), Dutch physician in Japan
- Jo van den Broek (1898–1978), Dutch architect
- Johannes van den Broek (1882–1946), Dutch businessman and Minister of Finance
- John van den Broek (1894/1895–1918) Dutch cinematographer who died while filming
- Klaas van den Broek (born 1955), Dutch ice hockey player
- Koen van den Broek (born 1973), Belgian painter
- Marc van den Broek (born 1953), Belgian painter and sculptor
- Marilène van den Broek (born 1970), Dutch princess
- Marleen van den Broek (born 1971), Dutch singer and presenter known as Marlayne
- Nanja van den Broek (born 1975), Dutch freediver
- Roel van den Broek (born 1931), Dutch religious history scholar
- Theo van den Broek (born 1930s), New Zealand football player
- Theodore J. Van den Broek (1783–1851), Dutch Dominican missionary to the United States

== Variants ==
- Andrea van de Broeke, Dutch cricketer
- Cora Vander Broek, American actress
- Sophie Vandebroek (born 1962), Belgian electrical engineer and business executive

== See also ==
- Broek (disambiguation)
- Vandenbroek, Wisconsin, a town in Outagamie County
- Bruch/Von dem Bruch/Vom Bruch, Bruche, Bruck/Brück/Brueck, von Bruck, Bruk
- Brucke/Brücke, Brücker, Brückner, Brückl
- Brog, Brugge/Brügge, Brüggen/Van Bruggen, van Brug, Brøgger/Brügger, Brüggermann, Tebrügge, Bruegge
- Brock/Broeck, Brocke, Broek, Broekx, Broke, Broucke, Ten Broeck, Ten Broek, Ten Broeke, Ten Brook, Van den Broek/Van den Broeck, Van den Broecke, Vandenbroucke
