= Gerhart Bruckmann =

Austrian politician (1932–2024)

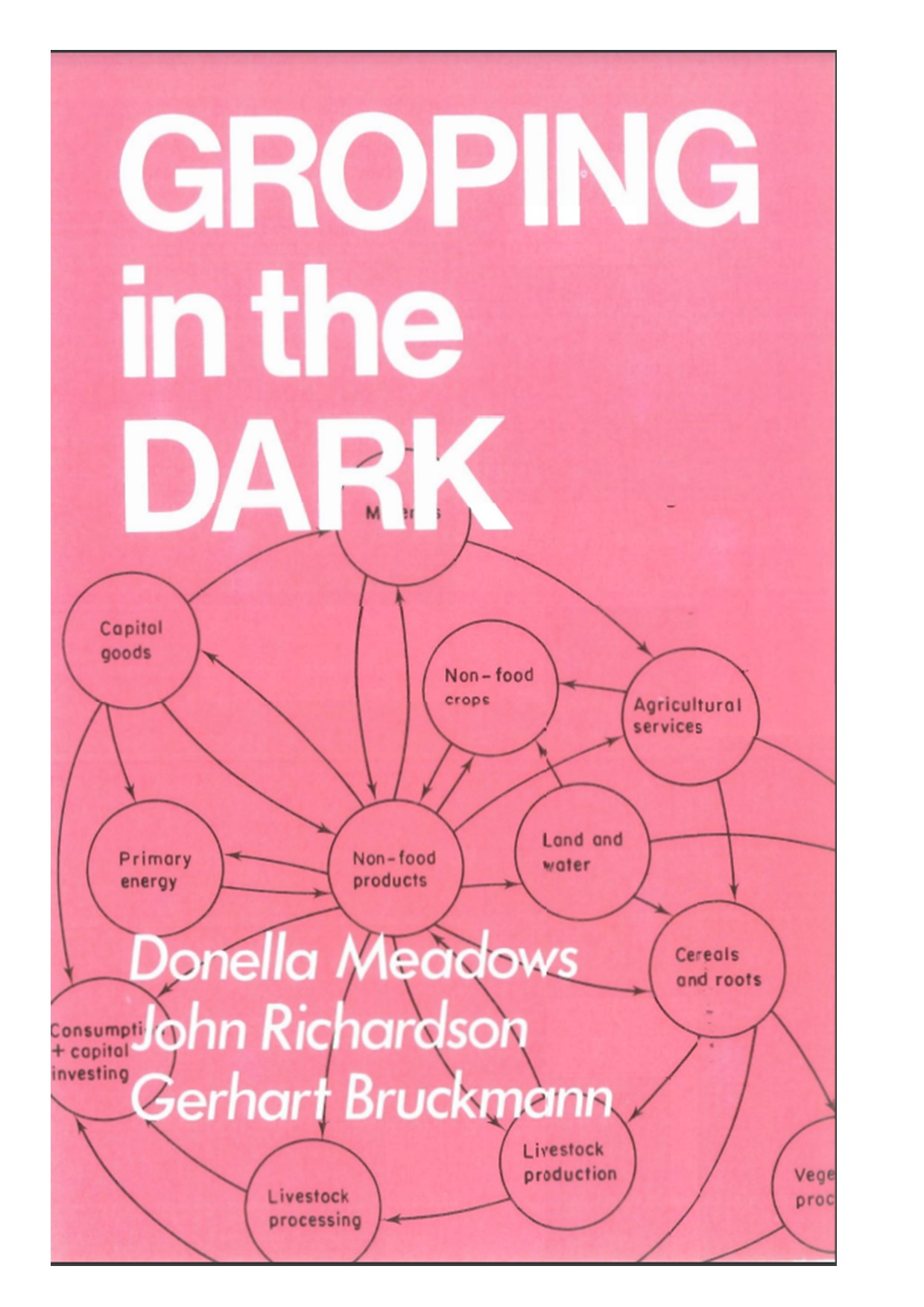
- Groping in the Dark by Bruckmann, Donella Meadows, and John M. Richardson

Member of the National Council of Austria
- In office 29 October 1999 – 19 December 2002
- In office 17 December 1986 – 6 November 1994

Personal details
- Born: 9 January 1932 Vienna, Austria
- Died: 14 June 2024 (aged 92) Vienna, Austria
- Party: ÖVP
- Education: Graz University of Technology; TU Wien; University of Vienna
- Occupation: Scientist; Author

Gerhart Bruckmann (9 January 1932 – 14 January 2024) was an Austrian politician. A member of the Austrian People's Party, he served in the National Council from 1986 to 1994 and again from 1999 to 2002.

Bruckmann died in Vienna on 14 January 2024, at the age of 92.
