= Mireille Broucke =

Canadian electrical and computer engineer

Academic background
- Education: University of Texas at Austin
- Alma mater: University of California, Berkeley
- Thesis: Qualitative Analysis, Model Checking, and Controller Synthesis of Hybrid Systems (2000)
- Doctoral advisor: Alberto Sangiovanni-Vincentelli

Academic work
- Discipline: Engineering
- Sub-discipline: Electrical engineering, Computer engineering
- Institutions: University of Toronto
- Main interests: Control theory, Mathematical systems theory, Swarm robotics

Mireille Esther Broucke is a professor of electrical and computer engineering at the University of Toronto, interested in control theory, mathematical systems theory, and swarm robotics.

Broucke did her undergraduate studies at the University of Texas at Austin, where her father Roger A. Broucke, an immigrant from Belgium, was a professor of aerospace engineering and engineering mechanics. She graduated in 1984, with a bachelor's degree in electrical engineering. She went on to graduate study in electrical engineering and computer science at the University of California, Berkeley, earning a master's degree in 1987, with summer jobs working on missile tracking software for Texas Instruments, General Dynamics, and Lockheed Corporation.

After completing her master's degree, she stayed in the San Francisco Bay Area, working on software for control systems and simulation at Intergraph and Integrated Systems. She returned to Berkeley for a Ph.D., which she completed in 2000. Her dissertation, supervised by Alberto Sangiovanni-Vincentelli, was Qualitative Analysis, Model Checking, and Controller Synthesis of Hybrid Systems. After postdoctoral studies at Berkeley she joined the Toronto faculty in 2001.
