= Jackie Brookner =

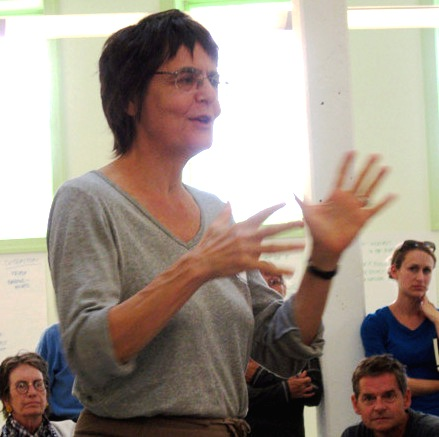
- Born: 1945; Providence, Rhode Island, U.S.
- Died: May 15, 2015 (aged 69); New York City, New York, U.S.

Jackie Brookner (1945 – May 15, 2015) was an ecological artist, writer, and educator. She worked with ecologists, design professionals, engineers, communities, and policy-makers on water remediation/public art projects for parks, wetlands, rivers, and urban stormwater runoff. In these projects, local resources become the focal point of community collaboration and collective creative agency.

Brookner lived in New York City and worked and lectured internationally.

== Education ==
Brookner was born in Providence, Rhode Island, and received her B.A. from Wellesley College. She completed all work for a Ph.D. in Art History from Harvard University, except the dissertation, as her focus shifted to making sculpture in 1971. In 1975 she assisted steel sculptor Isaac Witkin in Bennington, Vermont. The following year, she moved to New York City and attended the New York Studio School, where she studied drawing with Nicolas Carone.

== Early work ==
Brookner's landscape-scale ecological art evolved from her sculptures and installations from the 1980s and early 1990s. In the early 1980s at Oscarsson Hood Gallery in New York, Brookner exhibited cast bronze sculptures that were based on the movement of water and growth in plants. In 1987, she began juxtaposing materials such as soil, velvet, inner tubes, pillow stuffing, exhaust pipes, and chiffon to explore the psychological and gendered associations these materials carried.

== Soil works ==
In the early 1990s, Brookner's writing focused on how our materialistic culture could be so at war with the matrix of its own matter, the Earth. Using soil as a metaphor for raw matter in her wall pieces and Soil Chairs, she investigated the cultural associations of dirt, excrement, sex, and death. In her museum installations, Brookner focused on historical relationships of soil in particular regions.

=== Of Earth and Cotton (1994–98) ===
This project traveled from 1994 to 1998 to the following venues: McKissick Museum, Columbia, South Carolina (1994); Diggs Gallery, Winston-Salem State University, North Carolina (1995); The Hunter Museum of Art, Chattanooga, Tennessee (1995); The Columbus Museum, Columbus, Georgia (1995); University of North Texas Art Gallery, Denton, Texas (1996); The National Civil Rights Museum, Memphis, Tennessee (1996); Gallery 210, University of Missouri, St. Louis, Missouri (1998). The project evolved as it crossed the southern U.S. to follow the migration of the Cotton Belt from the Carolinas westward. At each location, Brookner spoke with former cotton farmers who hand-picked cotton in the 1930s and 1940s, as she modeled portraits of their feet with local soil. These became the focal points of installations where they rested on 60-tons of soil or 2,500-pounds of ginned cotton. Accompanying the installation was a video documenting Brookner's conversations and forty Farm Security Administration photographs from the 1930s (selected by Susan Harris Edwards) depicting the living and working conditions of cotton farmers during the Depression.

=== Native Tongues, Miro Foundation, Barcelona, Spain (1997) ===
While listening to the Castilian (Spanish) and Catalan languages, Brookner imagined the shapes of the tongues speaking them. She then sculpted Castilian and Catalan tongues from soils collected in central Spain and Catalonia, respectively. The same soils were used to make a 50-foot wall-drawing based on phonetics diagrams that map where the tongue is placed to make specific sounds. This sound, sculpture, and drawing installation explored the corporeality of speech in the context of Catalonia where regional languages, prohibited and politicized under Franco's regime, intersect with homeland, territory, and power.

== Biosculptures ==
Brookner was guest editor of the College Art Association's Art Journal on "Art and Ecology" (1992). Her research for this issue inspired her to develop a practice that could provide ecological benefits and help transform cultural values.

This research led Brookner to develop her Biosculptures: living water filtration systems that unite the conceptual and aesthetic capacities of sculpture with ecological function. These sculpted wetland ecosystems are made of mosses and plants growing on stone and concrete substrates, while the water they filter is inhabited by fish, snails, plants, and other organisms. Together they form a complete ecosystem. The plants and the bacteria that live in their root zones convert waste and pollutants in the water into food for their own metabolism, demonstrating that in healthy natural systems there is no waste. Conceptually, the entropic, symbiotic relationship serves to reveal "the creativity of detritus, showing that decay is part of creation.

The first Biosculpture, Prima Lingua, was commissioned in 1995 by Appalachian State University for the exhibition "Views From Ground Level, Art and Ecology in the Late Nineties." It is a large tongue that licks and cleans the polluted water in which it stands. I’m You, commissioned in 2000 by Wave Hill, Bronx, New York, for the exhibition "Abundant Invention," resembles human hands but is based on microscopic moss structures.

In her Biosculptures and other works, Brookner frequently uses imagery where parts of the body stand for the whole. This reflects the paradox of how humans consider themselves as independent wholes even though we are actually parts of an interdependent universe.

== Landscape-scale water projects/creative catalyst ==
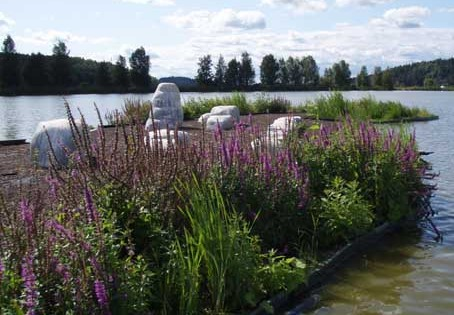
Veden Taika (2007–09)

Since 2002, Brookner has been collaborating with ecologists, engineers, policy makers, design professionals, and community residents to create multifunctional water remediation/public art projects. These landscape-scale public projects demonstrate how stormwater and other polluted waters can be reclaimed and used to restore habitat in parks, wetlands, rivers, former sewage treatment lagoons, and other contexts.

=== The Fargo Project, Fargo, North Dakota (2010-ongoing) ===
At the time of her death Brookner was working on a pilot project with The City of Fargo, ND, Fargo residents, and local artists to transform an 18-acre stormwater detention basin into a multifunctional neighborhood commons through a process intended to catalyze collective creative agency within Fargo's diverse population. It will include restored prairie and wetland habitats, an orchard, natural play areas, an amphitheater, festival spaces, gathering areas, and community gardens that will feed 50 families. This pilot project will be a model for 19 other neighborhood basins throughout Fargo.

=== Veden Taika (The Magic of Water), Halikonlahti Bird Pools, Salo, Finland (2007–09) ===
Veden Taika consists of three floating islands that provide safe habitat for nesting birds, improve water quality through phytoremediation with native wetland plants and subsurface aeration, and create an aesthetic focal point in a former sewage treatment lagoon. The project was conceived in consultation with local ecologists and artist/project manager Tuula Nikulainen, engineered with Biomatrix Water, and implemented in collaboration with high school students, local artists, local scientists, volunteers, and city agencies. One of the successful goals of the project was to create collaborations between city agencies, who have not worked together before, to provide solutions to local environmental problems.

=== Urban Rain, Roosevelt Community Center, San Jose, California (2005–08) ===
Brookner's work at this LEED gold-certified building captures stormwater runoff from the roof with two sculptural rock filtration systems: the Coyote Creek and Thumbprint Filters. Urban Rain reduces the volume and improves the quality of the water entering into the stormwater sewer system and the Coyote Creek Watershed. The Coyote Creek Filter contextualizes the building itself as a watershed within the larger Coyote Creek watershed and reveals infiltration processes that normally happen underground. The imagery of the Thumbprint Filter is based on the spiral pattern of a real thumbprint, and echoes the spiral eddies of wind, water, and galaxies.

=== Dreher Park Art and Design, West Palm Beach, Florida, with Angelo Ciotti (2003–04) ===
Brookner and Ciotti were part of the design team to enhance water flow, flood control systems, and recreational facilities for the redesign of Dreher Park. They conceived the Elders’ Cove landscape complex to feature the then-underutilized Northern section of the park. Elders’ Cove includes a 14-foot Biosculpture in one of the new detention ponds, a viewing and fishing dock, wetland habitats, mounds that reclaim and sculpt soil from the lake excavations, and a gathering area that draws on the area's Seminole history.

=== Laughing Brook, Salway Park, Cincinnati, Ohio (2002–09) ===
This project consists of over 100 Biosculptures in constructed wetlands that treat stormwater runoff from 3 acres of ballfields and parking lots to lessen pollutant impact on the adjacent endangered Mill Creek. The stormwater, collected in a 10,000-gallon underground cistern, irrigates the Biosculptures. The water cycles repeatedly through the wetland until the next large rainfall, when it is released into the creek. The entire system is solar powered. The Biosculptures are shaped like hands that gradually transform into six species of fish that would inhabit the river if it were healthy. Brookner collaborated with the Mill Creek Restoration Project and Human Nature Landscape Architects, local artists, high school students, and other volunteers to build, plant, and maintain the project.

=== Art and Community Landscapes (2002–03) ===
Brookner and Susan Steinman were selected to be artists in residence with the National Park Service Rivers and Trails Conservation Assistance program through a National Endowment for the Arts and National Park Service partnership called "Art and Community Landscapes." Working with three towns, Tillamook, Oregon, Puyallup, Washington, and Caldwell, Idaho, to build communities of support for local creek daylighting and trail projects, they created concept plans and guided public ecological art projects. They also started annual river celebrations that continue today and fostered many new partnerships between different interest groups in each city.

=== The Gift of Water, Grossenhain, Germany (2001) ===
This Biosculpture is part of a wetland pond that provides natural filtration for a large public swimming complex used daily by over 1,500 people. Two large moss-covered hands reach from the bank of the wetland into the pond, cupping the water in which they are immersed.

== Teaching ==
Brookner taught at the University of Pennsylvania, Harvard University, Bard College, the New York Studio School, and Parsons The New School for Design, where she continued to teach until her death.
