= Bertram St. Leger Ten Broeke =

Indian police deputy inspector general

Bertram St. Leger Ten Broeke CIE MC
- Born: 1895; Simla, Punjab, India
- Died: 2 November 1962 (aged 66–67); London, England

Bertram St. Leger Ten Broeke CIE MC (1895 – 2 November 1962), was Deputy Inspector-General of the Indian Police in Bihar between 1939 and 1947 for which he was made CIE. During World War I he was awarded the Military Cross for conspicuous gallantry and devotion to duty, and was awarded the Indian Police Medal in 1937.

== Life ==
Bertram St. Leger Ten Broeke was born in Simla, Punjab, India, in 1895. He was educated at Bedford Modern School where he was Head of School and a member of the 1st XV. He was the brother of Melville Rysdale Ten Broeke.

After school, Ten Broeke was employed in Lancashire on the LNWR for five years. At the outbreak of World War I he joined the King's Liverpool Regiment before being commissioned into the Dorset Regiment, where he served in France for much of the duration of the war. He rose to the rank of Captain and was awarded the Military Cross in 1918 for conspicuous gallantry and devotion to duty. His citation read:’

For conspicuous gallantry and devotion to duty in a raid by his battalion. He was in charge of the fourth wave, and was responsible for the mopping up, which he carried out with great energy and thoroughness. He obtained valuable identifications and papers from enemy dug-outs, and took some of the occupants prisoners as they were coming out. He did very fine work.

After World War I, Ten Broeke joined the Indian Police quickly rising to the rank of Assistant Superintendent at Bihar and subsequently Orissa. He was awarded the Indian Police Medal in 1937 and was Deputy Inspector-General of the Indian Police in Bihar between 1939 and 1947.

Following his retirement, Ten Broeke spent two years in Vancouver before returning to England where he focussed his attention on his interest in Rugby, becoming a Stand Steward at Twickenham to enjoy international matches. He died in London on 2 November 1962 and was survived by his wife and a daughter.
