= Raseiniai uezd =

Raseiniai uezd (Russian: Россиенский уезд, Raseinių apskritis) was one of the uezds of the Russian Empire with its seat in Raseiniai from 1793 until 1915 when it became a part of Lithuania District in Oberost.

== History ==
Established 1795 under the rule of Vilna Governorate. 1842 transferred to Kovno Governorate.

== Demographics ==
At the time of the Russian Empire Census of 1897, Rossiyensky Uyezd had a population of 235,362. Of these, 76.2% spoke Lithuanian, 11.2% Yiddish, 5.5% Polish, 4.4% German, 2.0% Russian, 0.3% Ukrainian, 0.1% Belarusian and 0.1% Latvian as their native language.
