= Jacques van den Broek =

Dutch CEO

Jacques van den Broek (born 24 May 1960, Goes) is the CEO of Randstad NV since March 2014. He also serves as the company's chairman. He joined the company as a branch manager in 1988. He once served as an independent director of Vedior. He holds a degree in law from Tilburg University.
