= Melville Rysdale Ten Broeke =

Lt.-Col. Melville Rysdale Ten Broeke MC*

Lieutenant-Colonel Melville Rysdale Ten Broeke MC & bar (1891 – 1963) was commander of No. 2 Company of Princess Patricia’s Canadian Light Infantry during World War I who ‘fought and led his company with conspicuous gallantry in every important action from the attack on Courcelette to the capture of Jigsaw Wood’ and was later in command of Princess Patricia’s Canadian Light Infantry Regiment between 1927 and 1932. After World War I, Ten Broeke was requested to head a Royal Guard of Honour consisting of 3 officers and 100 men at the wedding ceremony of Princess Patricia of Connaught on 27 February 1919.

== Life ==
Ten Broeke was born in July 1891 at Simla, Punjab, India. He was the son of James Arnold Ten Broeke who worked in the Indian Civil Service and was educated at Bishop Cotton School in India and Bedford Modern School in England. He was the brother of Bertram St. Leger Ten Broeke.

Ten Broeke began his career as a civil engineer at Winnipeg in Canada. At the outbreak of World War I in 1914, he enlisted as a private with the 23rd Battalion before being transferred to Princess Patricia’s Canadian Light Infantry Regiment on 1 March 1915 and receiving a commission in that regiment on 18 June 1916. In 1918 he was promoted to captain, then major, thereafter commanding and inspiring No.2 Company of the PPCLI to capture four German officers and fourteen other ranks at the Battle of Vimy Ridge for which he was awarded the MC.

While still in command of No.2 Company of the PPCLI at the battles of Passchendaele and Jigsaw Wood, he ‘fought his command forward with great skill’ and won a bar to his Military Cross.

Ten Broeke became Colonel Stewart’s second in command in the PPCLI and was invited to attend the marriage of Princess Patricia of Connaught’s wedding on 27 February 1919 at Westminster where he was in charge of a Royal Guard of Honour consisting of three officers and a hundred men. Commenting on the appointment of Ten Broeke, a military historian wrote: ‘The appointment of Ten Broeke was a particularly happy one. He had seen long service with the Regiment as an enlisted man; and as an officer he fought and led his company with conspicuous gallantry in every important action from the attack on Courcelette to the capture of Jigsaw Wood’.

In 1920, Ten Broeke married Marjorie Ellen Haslock Cook, daughter of W.H. Cook of Hertford, England. She died aged 41 on 11 March 1936 leaving Ten Broeke and her son by a previous marriage. Ten Broeke died in Saanich, British Columbia on 3 May 1963 and was survived by his stepson, a brother in Las Vegas and a brother and sister in England.
