= Albert Verbrugghe =

Albert Verbrugghe was a cement factory worker from Belgium whose wife Madeleine, and a female passenger, Aline Van Den Eyke, were shot and killed while driving to Jadotville in their Volkswagen Beetle by Indian UN troops during the Siege of Jadotville, the Congo, on 3 January 1963. A photo of him emerging distraught from his vehicle was printed in world newspapers. The reason for the shooting was never fully established. Time magazine suggested that the soldiers were "nervous". The film was shot by BBC cameraman Ernest Christie.

David Van Reybrouck, a Belgian historian whose father was employed by Nouvelle Compagnie du Chemin de Fer du Bas-Congo au Katanga (B.C.K.) and who was an eye-witness to the scene from his apartment window, wrote that the Indian U.N. troops might have mistaken Verbrugghe and his company for "white mercenaries". Only when the dead bodies of the two women and the dog were laid down in the grass besides the road, Verbrugghe seemed to realize what had happened. The dog was left there for a week. The photo was printed in the Book of Knowledge annual for 1964. The photo was also printed in the Britannica Book of the Year in 1964.

A film by Bruce Baillie, A Hurrah For Soldiers, was dedicated to Verbrugghe.
