= Simon Brügger =

Swiss sailor

Personal information
- Nationality: Swiss
- Born: 17 September 1975 (age 51)

Sport
- Sport: Sailing

Simon Brügger (born 17 September 1975) is a Swiss sailor. He competed at the 2000 Summer Olympics and the 2004 Summer Olympics.
