= Roger A. Broucke =

Belgian aerospace engineer

Roger A. Broucke (March 25, 1932 – June 21, 2005) was an aerospace engineer known for his solutions to the three-body problem. After working on practical orbital mechanics at the Jet Propulsion Laboratory, he became a professor at the University of Texas at Austin.

== Life ==
Broucke was born on a farm in Veurne. He studied at the Catholic University of Leuven, earning bachelor's and master's degrees in mathematics in 1955 and 1957 respectively, under the mentorship of Georges Lemaître. After completing his military service he worked for the oil industry while earning a second master's degree, in operations research, from the University of Brussels in 1960.

He returned to Leuven for his doctoral work, on the three-body problem, which he completed in 1962. At this time he moved to California to work at the Jet Propulsion Laboratory; while there, he also took adjunct positions at West Coast University, the University of Southern California, and the University of California, Los Angeles (UCLA). His position at UCLA became a regular-rank associate professorship in 1969.

In 1975, Broucke moved to the University of Texas at Austin as an associate professor of aerospace engineering and engineering mechanics. At Austin, he helped found the Texas Institute for Computational Mechanics in 1976.

== Contributions ==
In the three-body problem, Broucke's doctoral research involved pioneering use of computer simulations to classify stable and unstable orbits. He investigated what happens to this classification for earth–moon–satellite systems in the limit as the ratio of earth to moon mass approaches zero; his conjecture about this limiting behavior, "Broucke's principle", was finally proven correct in 1981 by Lawrence Perko. As part of this work, he also developed symbolic computation methods for handling Poisson series.

Later, he studied the anisotropic Kepler problem, a mathematical model of the motion of an electron trapped in a potential well. As he showed, this system is not purely chaotic: it has periodic orbits as well. He also studied the use of gravity assist in finding efficient flight plans for space probes.

== Recognition ==
In 1973, Broucke became executive editor of the journal Celestial Mechanics.

The American Astronautical Society gave him their Dirk Brouwer Award in 2002.

== Personal ==
Broucke's daughter, Mireille Broucke, is a noted control theorist at the University of Toronto.

== Selected publications ==
- Broucke, R. (June 1969), "Stability of periodic orbits in the elliptic, restricted three-body problem", AIAA Journal, 7 (6): 1003–1009, Bibcode:1969AIAAJ...7.1003B, doi:10.2514/3.5267
- Broucke, R.; Garthwaite, K. (June 1969), "A programming system for analytical series expansions on a computer", Celestial Mechanics, 1 (2): 271–284, Bibcode:1969CeMec...1..271B, doi:10.1007/bf01228844, S2CID 119570369
- Broucke, R. A.; Cefola, P. J. (May 1972), "On the equinoctial orbit elements", Celestial Mechanics, 5 (3): 303–310, Bibcode:1972CeMec...5..303B, doi:10.1007/bf01228432, S2CID 123468742
- Broucke, R. (August 1988), "The celestial mechanics of gravity assist", Astrodynamics Conference, American Institute of Aeronautics and Astronautics, doi:10.2514/6.1988-4220
- Broucke, Roger A. (July 2003), "Solution of the elliptic rendezvous problem with the time as independent variable", Journal of Guidance, Control, and Dynamics, 26 (4): 615–621, Bibcode:2003JGCD...26..615B, doi:10.2514/2.5089
