= Samantha Brugmann =

American researcher

- Born: Samantha Ann Brugmann
- Education: Tulane University; Columbian College of Arts and Sciences
- Scientific career
- Fields: Developmental biology
- Workplaces: Cincinnati Children's Hospital
- Thesis: The induction and function of xenopus six 1 in cranial placode development (2005)

Samantha Ann Brugmann is an American developmental biologist. She is an associate professor at the University of Cincinnati Department of Surgery and is currently studying the development of, as well as diseases related to, the cranium and face (craniofacial). Brugmann's research focuses on the function of the primary cilium and how it affects craniofacial development as well as the development of neural crest cells.

== Education ==
Brugmann completed a Bachelor of Arts in cell and molecular biology from Tulane University in New Orleans, Louisiana in 1998. She then got her Ph.D. in genetics at Columbian College of Arts and Sciences in 2004. Her dissertation was titled, The induction and function of xenopus six 1 in cranial placode development. In 2010, Brugmann then finished her postdoctoral research fellowship studying chemical and systems biology at Stanford University.

== Work and studies ==
Brugmann currently works at Cincinnati Children's Hospital Medical Center, having been there since 2011, and studies craniofacial development and the diseases it involves. She prefers to do her research on avian embryos such as chick, quail, and duck, only occasionally returning to Xenopus laevis. Her goals are to find a way to both understand the mechanisms that lead to craniofacial malformations as well as how to develop neural crest cells into various skeletal tissues so that they can be used for repairing craniofacial malformations through surgery.

As recently as 2021, Brugmann published a paper in which she and her team found 1609 genes that are in close proximity to Gli target genes within the mandibular prominence. After gene ontology analysis, they were able to conclude that these 1609 genes are important in cell cycle progression, ossification, and osteoblast differentiation. Through these discoveries, there is now a better starting line for the cause, or causes, of ciliopathic micrognathia (or the development of a small jaw).

== Awards ==
Brugmann received a series of three awards while at Stanford University. The first of which was the Ruth L. Kirschstein National Research Service Awards for Individual Postdoctoral Fellows (F32) in 2006. The following awards was a Pediatric Research Fund-Child Health Research Program Grant in 2009, quickly followed by an NIH Pathway to Independence Award (K99/R00) in 2010 for her research on, and subsequent paper 'The emerging face of primary cilia'.

In 2016 Brugmann received an award from President Obama known as The Presidential Early Career Awards for Scientists and Engineers Then, in 2017, she received The Sustaining Outstanding Achievement in Research (SOAR) award for her research in neural crest cells development in hopes of finding a way to repair malformations in craniofacial structures.
