= Progressive Conservative Party of Canada candidates in the 1968 Canadian federal election =

The Progressive Conservative Party of Canada fielded 262 candidates in the 1968 Canadian federal election, and elected seventy-two members to emerge as the Official Opposition in the House of Commons of Canada.

Many of the party's candidates have their own biography pages; information about others may be found here. This page also includes information about Progressive Conservative Party candidates in by-elections held between 1968 and 1972.

== by-elections ==
=== Nanaimo—Cowichan—The Islands, 10 February 1969: Magdalenus Verbrugge ===
Magdalenus Verbrugge was a physician based in Vancouver, and was fifty years old at the time of the election. Many regarded him as an outsider candidate. He received 1,966 votes (5.68%), finishing third against New Democratic Party leader Tommy Douglas.
