= George Broke =

British Army officer

George Broke CVO
- Born: George Robin Straton Broke; 1946 (age 79–80)
- Education: Eton College; Royal Military Academy Sandhurst
- Military career
- Allegiance: United Kingdom
- Branch: British Army
- Rank: Colonel
- Unit: Royal Artillery
- Commands: 3rd Regiment, Royal Horse Artillery; Honourable Corps of Gentlemen at Arms

Colonel George Robin Straton Broke CVO (born 1946) was Equerry to the Queen 1974–1977, and also responsible to the Princes Andrew and Edward.

Broke was born in 1946, son of Major-General Robert Broke CB OBE MC, and was educated at Eton College and Sandhurst. He served in the Royal Artillery 1965–1996

He went to the Staff College, Camberley and qualified as a Staff Officer (psc). He was also a qualified helicopter pilot (ph). He was promoted to Captain 31 March 1973, and to Acting Major 21 October 1974

He was promoted to Lieutenant-Colonel 30 June 1985, and commanded the 3rd Regiment, Royal Horse Artillery 1987–1989. He became a Colonel 30 June 1990. Since 1996 he has been the Director of the Association of Leading Visitor Attractions Broke has been a member of the Corps of Gentlemen at Arms since 22 February 1997 and retired as its Lieutenant.

He was appointed Lieutenant of the Royal Victorian Order (LVO) in 1977 and Commander of the Royal Victorian Order (CVO) in the 2016 Birthday Honours.

In 1978 he married Patricia T Shann. They have one son.

His family seat is Holme Hale, Norfolk.
