= Brugge (surname) =

Brugge is a Dutch surname, while Brügge is a German surname. Notable people with the surname include:

- David M. Brugge, American linguist
- Giles Brugge, 6th Baron Chandos, English courtier and soldier
- Henk Brugge (born 1977), Dutch football manager
- Joachim Brügge, German musicologist
- Joan Brugge, American biologist
- John de Brugge, English politician
- Juan Fernando Brügge (born 1962), Argentine politician
- Pieter Jan Brugge (born 1955), Dutch film producer
- Thomas Brugge, 5th Baron Chandos, English noble
- Walter de Brugge (died 1396), Irish clergyman and judge

== See also ==
- Bruch/Von dem Bruch/Vom Bruch, Bruche, Bruck/Brück/Brueck, von Bruck, Bruk
- Brucke/Brücke, Brücker, Brückner, Brückl
- Brog, Brugge/Brügge, Brüggen/Van Bruggen, van Brug, Brøgger/Brügger, Tebrügge, Bruegge
- Brock/Broeck, Brocke, Broek, Broekx, Broke, Broucke, Ten Broeck, Ten Broek, Ten Broeke, Ten Brook, Van den Broek/Van den Broeck, Van den Broecke, Vandenbroucke
