= Karl Ludwig von Bruck =

Austrian statesman

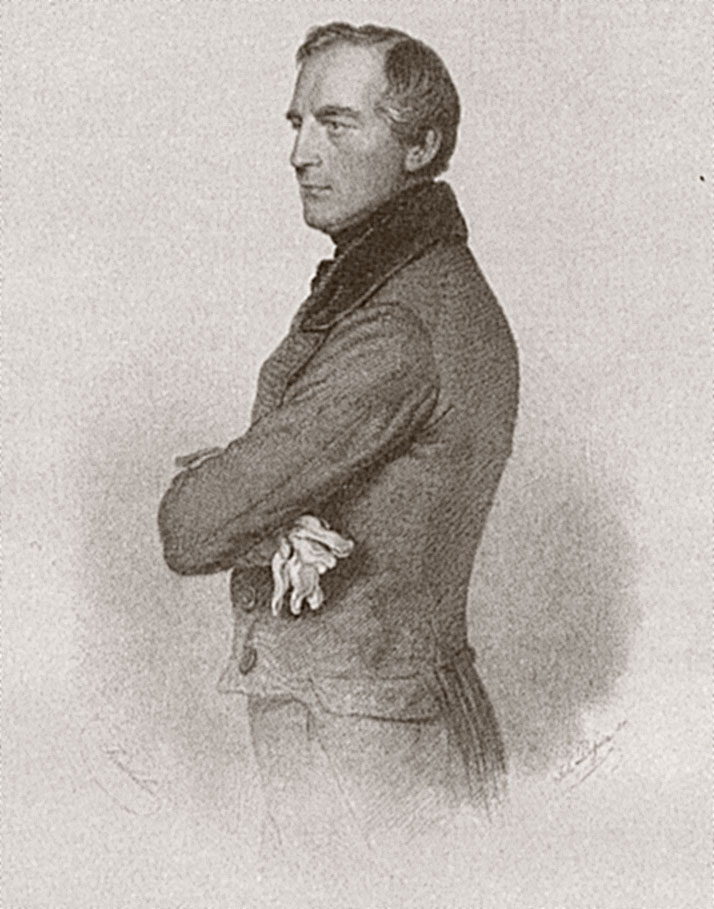
- c. 1860 engraving

Karl Ludwig Freiherr von Bruck (Elberfeld, 8 October 1798 – Vienna, 23 April 1860) was an Austrian statesman.

== Biography ==
In 1821 Bruck went to Trieste in order to take part in the War for Greek Independence, and, remaining there several years, founded the Trieste Lloyd (later Österreichischer Lloyd), a combination of insurance societies.

In 1848, he was a member of the Frankfurt Parliament. After the Vienna Revolution of October 1848, he became Minister of Commerce and Public Works. In this office, he introduced a number of reforms in the industrial policy of the government, established important telegraph lines, built a number of highways and railroads and founded the Austro-German Postal Union. In 1849 the Emperor gave him the rank of Baron, but in 1851 he was compelled to resign his ministry. During the same period, Bruck remained a key proponent of Austria’s financial modernization, including trade treaties and infrastructure expansion like logistic and communication strengthening of the Österreichische Creditanstalt. Bruck experience in economic reform informed his diplomatic stance; he sought to integrate economic and political objectives, using financial influence as a tool of foreign policy, which was notable given Austria’s limited military engagement in the war.

As Austrian Internuncio to the Porte (Ottoman court), Bruck became directly involved in negotiating and influencing Ottoman policy in response to Russian movements, particularly Russia’s occupation of the Danubian Principalities in July 1853. Austria’s primary objective was to prevent a total war while curbing Russian dominance in the Balkans and the Black Sea region. Bruck supported a firm stance toward the Ottoman Empire, advocating that Austria exert pressure on the Turks to impose restrictions upon Russian advances, aiming to enhance Austrian influence and prestige in the Near East. Historically, Bruck’s position has been seen as energetic and ambitious, but also disputed. Many historians viewed his proposals as a viable alternative to the cautious and sometimes indecisive policy of Austria’s Foreign Minister, Count Buol, which some argue contributed to Austria’s perceived diplomatic failure during the Crimean War. Bruck’s strategies often included leveraging reformist and liberal economic perspectives, tied to his vision of a central European economic union (Mitteleuropa) with the Danube as its main artery, seeking to align Austria’s economic strength with her political influence in Southeastern Europe.

In 1855, Bruck became Minister of Finance. Later in life, He was not able to introduce the reforms he wished and when a period of general financial disaster resulted from the Italian war, Bruck was personally blamed. He accordingly obtained his dismissal from the Emperor and the next day committed suicide. He was officially declared innocent one month after his death.
