= Ten Broeck (surname) =

Ten Broeck is a surname of Dutch origin, Americanized Ten Broek. Notable people with the surname include:

- Abraham Ten Broeck (1734–1810), American merchant and politician
- Dirck Wesselse Ten Broeck (ca.1638 – 1717), Dutch/American politician, businessman, and landowner
- Dirck Ten Broeck (1765–1832), American lawyer and politician
- Lance Ten Broeck (1956–2023), American golfer
- Robert Ten Broeck Stevens (1899–1983), American businessman
- Richard Ten Broeck (1812–1892), American racehorse owner

== See also ==
- Bruch/Von dem Bruch/Vom Bruch, Bruche, Bruck/Brück/Brueck, von Bruck, Bruk
- Brucke/Brücke, Brücker, Brückner, Brückl
- Brog, Brugge/Brügge, Brüggen/Van Bruggen, van Brug, Brøgger/Brügger, Tebrügge, Bruegge
- Brock/Broeck, Brocke, Broek, Broekx, Broke, Broucke, Ten Broeck, Ten Broek, Ten Broeke, Van den Broek/Van den Broeck, Van den Broecke, Vandenbroucke
