= Brücke (surname) =

Brücke is a surname. Notable people with the surname include:

- Ernst Wilhelm von Brücke (1819–1892), German physician and physiologist
- Wilhelm Brücke (1800–1874), German painter

== See also ==
- Bruch/Von dem Bruch/Vom Bruch, Bruche, Bruck/Brück/Brueck, von Bruck, Bruk
- Brucke/Brücke, Brücker, Brückner, Brückl
- Brog, Brugge/Brügge, Brüggen/Van Bruggen, van Brug, Brøgger/Brügger, Tebrügge, Bruegge
- Brock/Broeck, Ten Broeck, Ten Broek, Ten Broeke, Van den Broek/Van den Broeck, Van den Broecke
