= Van den Broeck =

Van den Broeck or Vandenbroeck is a Dutch toponymic surname most common in the Belgian provinces of Antwerp and East Flanders. "Broeck" is an archaic spelling of "broek" meaning "swamp". Notable people with the surname include:

- Arthur Moeller van den Bruck (1876–1925), German historian and writer
- Ann Van den Broeck (born 1976), Belgian actress and musician
- Charles Van den Broeck, Belgian tug of war competitor and Olympian
- Charlotte Van den Broeck (nl), Belgian poet
- Clemens van den Broeck (born 1943), Dutch goldsmith, sculptor and craftsman
- Chrispijn van den Broeck (1523–1591), Flemish painter
- David Vandenbroeck (born 1985), Belgian footballer
- Elias van den Broeck (1649–1708), Dutch Golden Age painter
- Hendrick van den Broeck (1519–1597), Flemish painter and brother of Willem van den Broecke
- Jan van den Broeck (b. 1989), Belgian middle-distance runner
- Jonathan Vandenbroeck (b. 1981), Belgian singer-songwriter known as "Milow"
- Jurgen Van den Broeck (born 1983), Belgian cyclist
- Nicole Vandenbroeck (1946–2017), Belgian road race cyclist
- Paul Van den Broeck (1904 – after 1924), Belgian bobsledder and ice hockey player
- Rob van den Broeck (de; 1940–2012), Dutch jazz pianist and composer
- Walter van den Broeck (born 1941), Belgian writer and playwright

Van den Broecke:

- Lily van den Broecke (b. 1992), British rower
- Pieter van den Broecke (1585–1640), Dutch cloth merchant in the service of the Dutch East India Company
- Willem van den Broecke (1530–1579), Flemish sculptor, painter, draughtsman and architect and brother of Hendrick van den Broeck
- Pongky van den Broecke (b. 1958), ‘The Last Parkenier’, Indonesian descendant of Paulus van den Broecke brother of Pieter van den Broecke, managed 12.5 ha of nutmeg plantation.

== See also ==
- intitle|Broeck}}
- Bruch/Von dem Bruch/Vom Bruch, Bruche, Bruck/Brück/Brueck, von Bruck, Bruk
- Brucke/Brücke, Brücker, Brückner, Brückl
- Brog, Brugge/Brügge, Brüggen/Van Bruggen, van Brug, Brøgger/Brügger, Tebrügge, Bruegge
- Brock/Broeck, Brocke, Broucke, Ten Broeck, Ten Broek, Ten Broeke, Van den Broek/Van den Broeck, Van den Broecke, Vandenbroucke
