= Ten Broeke =

ten Broeke is a Dutch surname. Notable people with the surname include:

- Bertram St. Leger Ten Broeke, Indian police deputy inspector general
- Han ten Broeke (born 1969), Dutch politician
- Melville Rysdale Ten Broeke

== See also ==
- Bruch/Von dem Bruch/Vom Bruch, Bruche, Bruck/Brück/Brueck, von Bruck, Bruk
- Brucke/Brücke, Brücker, Brückner, Brückl
- Brog, Brugge/Brügge, Brüggen/Van Bruggen, van Brug, Brøgger/Brügger, Tebrügge, Bruegge
- Brock/Broeck, Brocke, Ten Broeck, Ten Broek, Ten Broeke, Van den Broek/Van den Broeck, Van den Broecke
