= Bruckman =

Bruckman is a surname. Notable people with the surname include:

- Amy S. Bruckman (born 1965), American associate professor
- Clyde Bruckman (1894–1955), American writer and director of comedy films
  - Clyde Bruckman's Final Repose
- Lodewijk Bruckman (1903–1995), Dutch painter
- Shimshon Bruckman (born 1957), Israeli Olympic sailor

== See also ==
- Bruckmann
