= Brøgger =

Brøgger is a Danish and Norwegian surname which may refer to:

- Anton Wilhelm Brøgger (printer) (1820–1882), Norwegian book printer
- Anton Wilhelm Brøgger (archaeologist) (1884–1951), Norwegian archaeologist
- Niels Christian Brøgger (1914–1966), Norwegian writer
- Jan Brøgger (1936–2006), Norwegian anthropologist
- Suzanne Brøgger (born 1944), Danish writer
- Waldemar Christofer Brøgger (geologist) (1851–1940), Norwegian geologist
- Waldemar Christofer Brøgger (writer) (1911–1991), Norwegian writer

== See also ==
- Bruch/Von dem Bruch/Vom Bruch, Bruche, Bruck/Brück/Brueck, von Bruck, Bruk
- Brucke/Brücke, Brücker, Brückner, Brückl
- Brog, Brugge/Brügge, Brüggen/Van Bruggen, van Brug, Brøgger/Brügger, Tebrügge, Bruegge
- Brock/Broeck, Ten Broeck, Ten Broek, Ten Broeke, Van den Broek/Van den Broeck, Van den Broecke
