= Bruche =

Bruche may refer to:

== People ==
- Ernst Brüche, German physicist
- Julius Bruche (1873–1961), Australian Army officer
- Bruche, a young girl in the 1928 Soviet comedy-drama film Durkh trern (Through Tears)

== Places ==
- Bruche (river), a river in Alsace, France.
- Bruche, Warrington, a suburb of Warrington, United Kingdom.
- Bruche Canal, France

== See also ==
- Bruch/Von dem Bruch/Vom Bruch, Bruche, Bruck/Brück/Brueck, von Bruck, Bruk
- Brucke/Brücke, Brücker, Brückner, Brückl
- Brog, Brugge/Brügge, Brüggen/Van Bruggen, van Brug, Brøgger/Brügger, Tebrügge, Bruegge
- Brock/Broeck, Ten Broeck, Ten Broek, Ten Broeke, Van den Broek/Van den Broeck, Van den Broecke
- Bruch (disambiguation)
