= Von Bruck =

Von Bruck, von Brück, von den Bruck, van den Bruck, vom Bruck are German and Dutch/Flemish surnames similar to "Bruck", but using toponymic prefixes (called tussenvoegsels in Dutch). Surnames of the same origin include: van de Bruck, van den Brock, von den Bruck, Vormbrock, Vormbruck, Vormbrocke/Vorm-Brocke, Vormbrock, van den Broek, vor dem Brocke, Tenbruck - all meaning "from/by/at Notable people with the surname include:

- Arthur Moeller van den Bruck (1876–1925), German cultural historian ("Third Reich")
- Arnold von Bruck (c. 1500–1554), Franco-Flemish Renaissance composer
- Emil von Brück, German entomologist
- Karl Ludwig von Bruck, Austrian statesman

== See also ==
- Bruch/Von dem Bruch/Vom Bruch, Bruche, Bruck/Brück/Brueck, von Bruck, Bruk
- Brucke/Brücke, Brücker, Brückner, Brückl
- Brog, Brugge/Brügge, Brüggen/Van Bruggen, van Brug, Brøgger/Brügger, Tebrügge, Bruegge
- Brock/Broeck, Ten Broeck, Ten Broek, Ten Broeke, Van den Broek/Van den Broeck, Van den Broecke
