= Brüggen =

Brüggen may refer to:

== Places ==
- Brüggen, Germany, municipality in the district of Viersen, Germany
- RAF Bruggen, former Royal Air Force Station
- Brüggen (Leine), German municipality
- Brüggen Glacier, glacier in southern Chile

== People ==
- Daniël Brüggen, Dutch recorder player
- Frans Brüggen, Dutch conductor
- Juan Brüggen Messtorff, (1887–1953), German-Chilean geologist

== See also ==
- Bruch/Von dem Bruch/Vom Bruch, Bruche, Bruck/Brück/Brueck, von Bruck, Bruk
- Brucke/Brücke, Brücker, Brückner, Brückl
- Brog, Brugge/Brügge, Brüggen/Van Bruggen, van Brug, Brøgger/Brügger, Tebrügge, Bruegge
- Brock/Broeck, Ten Broeck, Ten Broek, Ten Broeke, Van den Broek/Van den Broeck, Van den Broecke
