= Bruk =

Bruk is a surname. Notable people with the surname include:

- Anni Bruk (1924–1998), Austrian shot putter
- Brooke Bruk-Jackson, Zimbabwean model who was crowned Miss Universe Zimbabwe 2023
- Glen Bruk-Jackson (born 1969), Zimbabwean cricketer

== See also ==
- Bruch/Von dem Bruch/Vom Bruch, Bruche, Bruck/Brück/Brueck, von Bruck, Bruk
- Brucke/Brücke, Brücker, Brückner, Brückl
- Brog, Brugge/Brügge, Brüggen/Van Bruggen, van Brug, Brøgger/Brügger, Tebrügge, Bruegge
- Brock/Broeck, Ten Broeck, Ten Broek, Ten Broeke, Van den Broek/Van den Broeck, Van den Broecke
