= Van Bruggen =

Van Bruggen is a Dutch toponymic surname translating to "from/of [the] bridge[s]". Variant names with the same origin are Ter Brugge(n), Ter Brugghen, Van de(r) Brug, Van der Brugge(n), Van der Brugghen, and Verbrugge(n). Different settlements and houses with the name (de) Brug(ge) ("the bridge") could also be at the source of each family name. People with these surnames include:

Van Bruggen

- Adolph Cornelis van Bruggen (1929–2016), Dutch malacologist
- Carry van Bruggen (1881–1932), Dutch novelist
- Claudia van Bruggen (born 1980), Dutch politician
- Coosje van Bruggen (1942–2009), Dutch-American sculptor and art historian
- Damian van Bruggen (born 1996), Dutch football defender
- Harry van Bruggen (1927–2010), Dutch amateur botanist
- John van Bruggen, Canadian animation writer and director

Van der Bruggen

- Hannes Van der Bruggen (born 1993), Belgian football midfielder
- Maurice van der Bruggen (1852–1919), Belgian politician, Minister of Agriculture 1899–1907

== Brugghen ==
- Hendrick ter Brugghen (1588–1629), Dutch painter
- Joannes van der Brugghen (1639–c.1740), Flemish painter, engraver, art dealer and publisher
- Justinus van der Brugghen (1804–1863), Dutch politician, Prime Minister 1856–58

== See also ==
- Galbert van Brugge or "Galbert of Bruges", 12th-century chronicler who lived in Bruges
- Bruch/Von dem Bruch/Vom Bruch, Bruche, Bruck/Brück/Brueck, von Bruck, Bruk
- Brucke/Brücke, Brücker, Brückner, Brückl
- Brog, Brugge/Brügge, Brüggen/Van Bruggen, van Brug, Brøgger/Brügger, Tebrügge, Bruegge
- Brock/Broeck, Ten Broeck, Ten Broek, Ten Broeke, Van den Broek/Van den Broeck, Van den Broecke
