= Bruch (surname) =

Bruch and vom Bruch are German surnames. In most cases, Bruch may be a topographic surname (after topographic features bruoch, 'moorland' or bruch, 'break', 'windbreak') or a toponymic surname related to any of settlements named Bruch. The locational particle "vom" ("von dem") means "of the". Notable people with the surname include:

- Bobby Bruch (born 1966), American association football player
- Carl Friedrich Bruch (1789–1857), German ornithologist
- Carlos Bruch born Franz Karl Bruch (1869-1943), German-born Argentinian entomologist
- Gerd vom Bruch (1941–2026), German football player and coach
- Hilde Bruch (1904–1984), psychoanalyst, expert on eating disorders
- Klaus vom Bruch (born 1952), German video artist
- Max Bruch (1838–1920), German composer
- Philipp Bruch (1781–1847), German pharmacist and bryologist
- Ricky Bruch (1946–2011), Swedish athlete
- Volker Bruch (born 1980), German actor
- Walter Bruch (1908–1990), German engineer

== See also ==
- Bruch/Von dem Bruch/Vom Bruch, Bruche, Bruck/Brück/Brueck, von Bruck, Bruk
- Brucke/Brücke, Brücker, Brückner, Brückl
- Brog, Brugge/Brügge, Brüggen/Van Bruggen, van Brug, Brøgger/Brügger, Tebrügge, Bruegge
- Brock/Broeck, Ten Broeck, Ten Broek, Ten Broeke, Van den Broek/Van den Broeck, Van den Broecke
