= Andrew Ten Brook =

American academic (1814-1899)

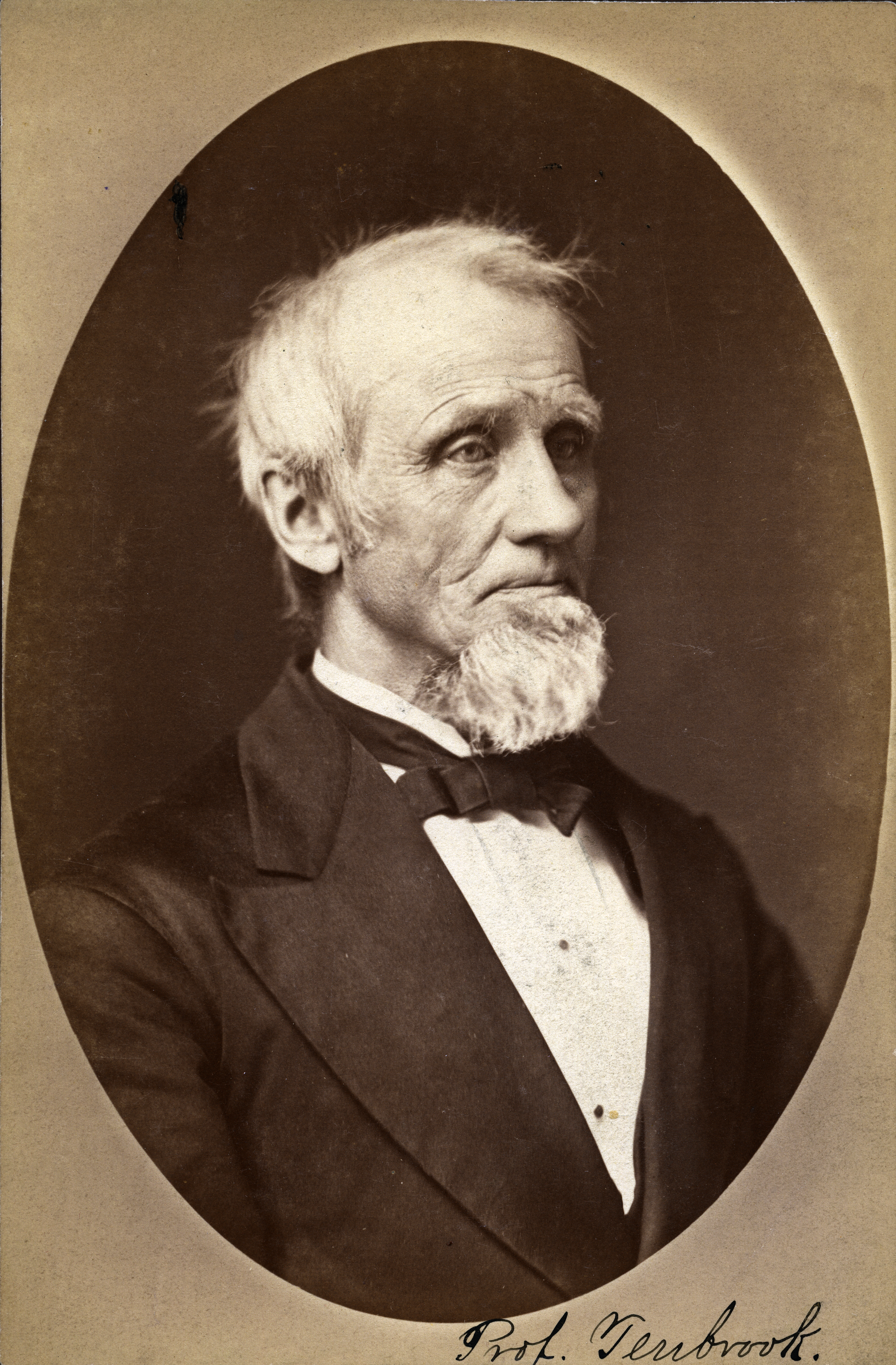
Andrew Ten Brook

Andrew Ten Brook (1814–1899) was one of the first faculty members appointed at the University of Michigan and the author of the first history of the University, State Universities and the University of Michigan, published in 1875. He served as Professor of Moral and Intellectual Philosophy at the University from 1844 through 1852. He resigned that position but returned to the University again to serve as University Librarian from 1864 through 1877.

== Early life ==
Ten Brook was born in Elmira, N. Y. on Sept. 21, 1814 and attended what was then called the Hamilton Literary and Theological Institution, a Baptist college in Hamilton New York, graduating from its Collegiate Department in 1839 and from the Theological Department in 1841. Hamilton Institution would be renamed Madison University in 1846 and Colgate University in 1890. In October 1841 he was ordained pastor of the First Baptist Church of Detroit, where he served for three years, at the same time editing the newspaper of the Baptist denomination in Michigan, the Michigan Christian Herald.

== A faculty member at Michigan ==
In September 1844, he was appointed to the chair of Moral and Intellectual Philosophy in the University of Michigan. The other members of the Faculty at this time were Professors Houghton, Williams, Whiting and Sager. In 1851, he resigned his chair and soon after became the editor of the New York Baptist Register, published at Utica, N. Y. In 1856, he was appointed U. S. consul at Munich in Bavaria. In 1864 he was made librarian of the University, serving in that position until 1877.
