= Bruckner (disambiguation) =

Anton Bruckner (1824–1896) was an Austrian composer.

Bruckner may also refer to:

- Bruckner (surname)
- Bruckner Expressway, in the Bronx, New York
- Bruckner Glacier, Greenland

== See also ==
- Brookner
- Buckner (disambiguation)
