= Brucker =

Brucker or Brücker is a surname, and may refer to:

== Real people ==
- Barry Brucker, American businessman and politician
- Earle Brucker Jr. (1925–2009), American baseball player
- Earle Brucker Sr. (1901–1981), American baseball player
- Erhard Brucker (born 1972), German politician
- Ferdinand Brucker (1858–1904), American politician
- Gene Brucker (1924–2017), American historian
- Harold G. Brucker, coach of the San Diego State Aztecs
- Herbert Brucker, American journalist
- Jane Brucker (born 1958), American actress
- Johann Jakob Brucker (1696–1770), German historian of philosophy
- Joseph Brucker (1849–1921), Austrian-American newspaper editor
- Margaretta Brucker (1883–1958), American novelist
- Otto-Hermann Brücker (1899–1964), German general
- Raymond Brucker, French writer
- René Brücker (born 1966), German canoeist
- Roger Brucker (born 1929), American cave explorer and author
- Walter Brucker, 1943 recipient of the Knight's Cross of the Iron Cross
- Wilber M. Brucker (1894–1968), American politician

== Fictional characters ==
- Helen Brucker, minor character in the 1999 television series Angel

== See also ==
- Bruker
- Brooker (disambiguation)
- Bruckner (disambiguation)
