= Brügge =

- Municipality
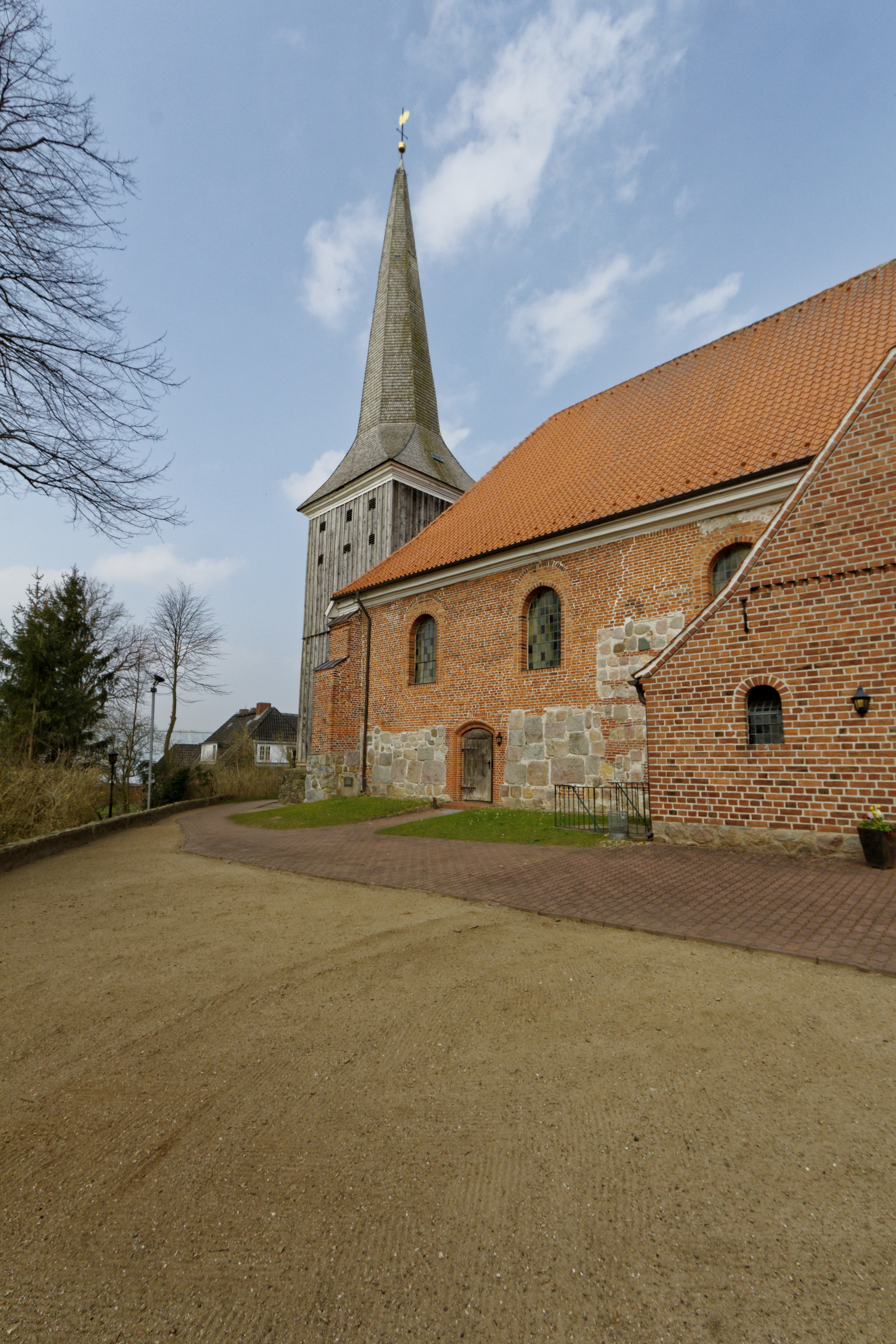

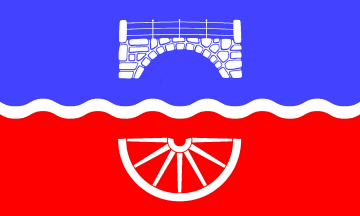
- Flag Coat of arms

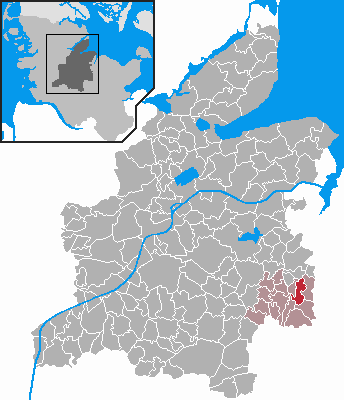
- Location of Brügge within Rendsburg-Eckernförde district
- Interactive map of Brügge
- Location within Germany Location within Schleswig-Holstein
- Coordinates: 54°11′N 10°4′E
- Country: Germany
- State: Schleswig-Holstein
- District: Rendsburg-Eckernförde
- Municipal assoc.: Bordesholm

Government
  - Mayor: Werner Kärgel

Area
  - Total: 7.86 km^{2} (3.03 sq mi)
- Elevation: 39 m (128 ft)

Population (2025-12-31)
  - Total: 1,150
  - Density: 146/km^{2} (379/sq mi)
- Time zone: UTC+01:00 (CET)
  - Summer (DST): UTC+02:00 (CEST)
- Postal codes: 24582
- Dialling codes: 04322
- Vehicle registration: RD
- Website: www.bordesholm.de

Brügge is a municipality in the district of Rendsburg-Eckernförde, in Schleswig-Holstein, Germany. Its small church and market square are noted for their beauty.
