= Brück =

- Town
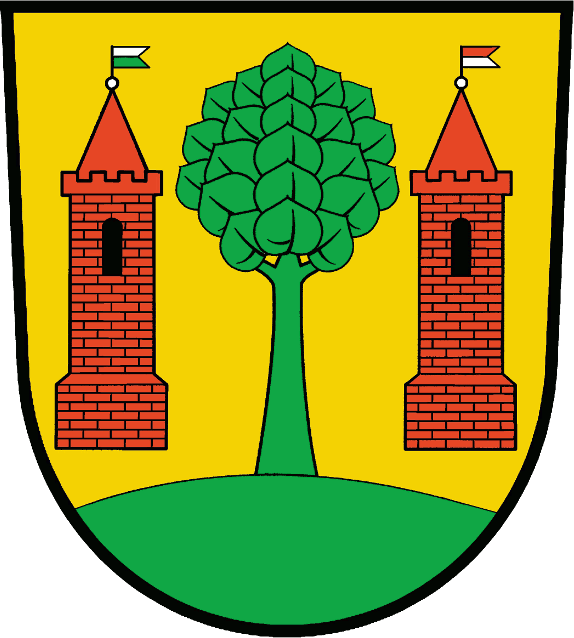
- Coat of arms

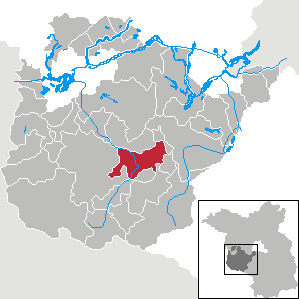
- Location of Brück within Potsdam-Mittelmark district
- Interactive map of Brück
- Location within Germany Location within Brandenburg
- Coordinates: 52°12′N 12°46′E
- Country: Germany
- State: Brandenburg
- District: Potsdam-Mittelmark
- Municipal assoc.: Brück
- Subdivisions: 5 Ortsteile

Government
  - Mayor (2024–29): Matthias Schimanowski

Area
  - Total: 86.19 km^{2} (33.28 sq mi)
- Elevation: 44 m (144 ft)

Population (2025-12-31)
  - Total: 4,222
  - Density: 48.98/km^{2} (126.9/sq mi)
- Time zone: UTC+01:00 (CET)
  - Summer (DST): UTC+02:00 (CEST)
- Postal codes: 14822
- Dialling codes: 033844
- Vehicle registration: PM
- Website: www.amt-brueck.de

Brück (German pronunciation: [bʁʏk]) is a town in the Potsdam-Mittelmark district, in Brandenburg, Germany. It is situated 29 km southwest of Potsdam, and 28 km southeast of Brandenburg. Parts of Brück are located in the High Fläming Nature Park.

At Brück, there is an aerial test facility with two 54-metre tall metal-free wooden towers.

== Demography ==
Development of Population since 1875 within the Current Boundaries (Blue Line: Population; Dotted Line: Comparison to Population Development of Brandenburg state; Grey Background: Time of Nazi rule; Red Background: Time of Communist rule)

Brück: Population development
within the current boundaries (2013)

Year	Pop.	±% p.a.
1875	2,734	—
1890	2,972	+0.56%
1910	3,354	+0.61%
1925	3,654	+0.57%
1933	3,863	+0.70%
1939	3,943	+0.34%
1946	6,044	+6.29%
1950	5,543	−2.14%
1964	4,618	−1.30%
1971	4,676	+0.18%
1981	4,338	−0.75%
1985	4,510	+0.98%
1989	4,342	−0.94%
1990	4,253	−2.05%
1991	4,213	−0.94%
1992	4,189	−0.57%
1993	4,194	+0.12%
1994	4,266	+1.72%
1995	4,273	+0.16%
1996	4,299	+0.61%

Year	Pop.	±% p.a.
1997	4,182	−2.72%
1998	4,163	−0.45%
1999	4,114	−1.18%
2000	4,028	−2.09%
2001	3,937	−2.26%
2002	3,885	−1.32%
2003	3,952	+1.72%
2004	3,887	−1.64%
2005	3,855	−0.82%
2006	3,769	−2.23%
2007	3,713	−1.49%
2008	3,629	−2.26%
2009	3,613	−0.44%
2010	3,623	+0.28%
2011	3,685	+1.71%
2012	3,692	+0.19%
2013	3,702	+0.27%
2014	3,736	+0.92%
2015	4,095	+9.61%
2016	3,999	−2.34%

== Sons and daughters of the city ==
- Franz Griesbach (1892–1984), Generalmajor of the Wehrmacht in the Second World War
- Lothar Koch (born 1943), district administrator
