= Henrik Steenbuch =

Norwegian lawyer and publicist

Henrik Steenbuch (20 November 1774 – 11 October 1839) was a Norwegian lawyer and publicist.
