= Chip Goodyear =

American businessman (born 1958)

- Born: January 18, 1958 (age 67); Hartford, Connecticut, US
- Education: Yale University (1980); Wharton School (1983)
- Occupation: Businessman
- Spouse: Elizabeth Dabezies
- Children: 2
- Parent: Charles W. Goodyear III

Charles Waterhouse "Chip" Goodyear IV (born January 18, 1958) is an American businessman and the former CEO of BHP. He is a member of the Goodyear family that had extensive business interests in lumber and railways, as well as significant philanthropic endeavors.

== Early life ==
Charles Waterhouse Goodyear IV was born on January 18, 1958, in Hartford, Connecticut. He is the son of Charles Waterhouse Goodyear III (born 1933), a Texas oil man who worked for Exxon (and later as a fuel products marketing manager for Exxon in Florham Park), of Darien, Connecticut.

Goodyear graduated from Yale University in 1980 with a science degree in geology and geophysics. While at Yale, he rowed on the lightweight crew team. He also received a Master of Business Administration from the Wharton School of the University of Pennsylvania in 1983.

== Career ==
After graduation in 1983, Goodyear began his career as an investment banker at a Wall Street brokerage, Kidder Peabody, advising companies on mergers, acquisitions and financing. He left Kidder Peabody in 1989 as Vice President and joined Freeport-McMoRan, one of the world's largest producers of copper and gold, as Vice President - Corporate Finance. He was promoted to Executive Vice President and chief financial officer in 1995, ultimately leaving the firm in 1997 to serve as president of Goodyear Capital Corporation until 1999.

In 1999, Goodyear joined BHP as chief financial officer based in London. He served in that role until 2001, when he became Chief Development Officer, a post he held until 2003. In 2003 Goodyear succeeded Brian Gilbertson as the chief executive officer of BHP relocating to Melbourne.

Goodyear retired from BHP on September 30, 2007 and was succeeded by Marius Kloppers. Goodyear was considered by Businessweek to have been responsible for BHP's turn-around during the 2000s since, under his leadership, sales increased by 47% and profits by 78%, placing him on top of their "Europe BW50 Leaders" list. Others, including consulting firm Deloitte, attributed BHP's success to rising global commodity prices.

On February 6, 2009, Temasek Holdings, which had a portfolio worth 185 billion Singapore dollars ($123 billion US dollars) at the time, announced his appointment as a board member and CEO-designate, to commence on March 1, 2009, succeeding Ho Ching from October 1, 2009. He was identified as a possible candidate for the top office in Temasek in 2007, when the Temasek Board began reviewing internal and external CEO candidates since early 2005. Goodyear would have been the first foreign executive to run the Singaporean sovereign fund company, however, on July 21, 2009, the Temasek Board and Goodyear announced that they had mutually agreed that he would not be taking over as CEO, citing differences in opinions on strategy. Instead, Ho Ching continued in the position, while Goodyear stepped down on August 15, 2009.

As of September 2015, Goodyear is again the president of "Goodyear Capital Corporation" and "Goodyear Investment Company".

== Personal life ==
On July 11, 1992, 34-year-old Goodyear married 28-year-old Elizabeth Dabezies at the chapel of the Academy of the Sacred Heart in New Orleans, Louisiana. Elizabeth Dabezies graduated from the University of Alabama and worked as a leasing manager with the Edward J. DeBartolo Corporation, a real-estate firm in New Orleans.

Together, they have two children:

- Charles W. "C.W." Goodyear V, author of President Garfield: From Radical to Unifier
- Adelaide Goodyear (born January 14, 1995)

Goodyear is a member of the National Petroleum Council and International Council on Mining and Metals.

=== Volunteer and philanthropy ===
At Yale University, Goodyear served as a member of the Yale University Tomorrow Campaign Committee and the inaugural board chairman of the Jackson Institute (which became the Yale Jackson School of Global Affairs). He currently serves on the President's Council on International Activities and chairs the Sterling Fellows society. He was named Successor Trustee of the Yale Corporation in 2011. Goodyear is also a director of several private companies and is a member of the Prince's Charities Council in the United Kingdom.

Business positions
Preceded by Brian Gilbertson	CEO of BHP; 2003–2007	Succeeded by Marius Kloppers
