= Emma Lyon =

English Romantic poet

- Born: 17 September 1788
- Died: 30 December 1870 (aged 82); London, England
- Spouse: Abraham Henry (m. 1816; died 1840)
- Children: 10
- Writing career
- Genre: Poetry
- Movement: Romanticism

Emma Henry (née Lyon; 17 September 1788 – 30 December 1870) was an English Jewish Romantic poet. Her volume Miscellaneous Poems (1812) was one of the first collections of poetry by a Jewish woman in English.

== Biography ==
=== Early life ===
Emma Lyon was born in 1788, the eldest daughter of Rachel (née Hart) and Solmon Lyon, a Hebrew tutor at the University of Cambridge originally from Kuttenplan, Bohemia. Lyon was raised with her fifteen siblings in Cambridge, where her father established England's first Jewish boarding school. She received a broad liberal education and wrote poetry in her leisure time. In 1808 Isaac Nathan, who had attended her father's school, published "Miss Lyon's Hornpipe" in her honour.

=== Career ===
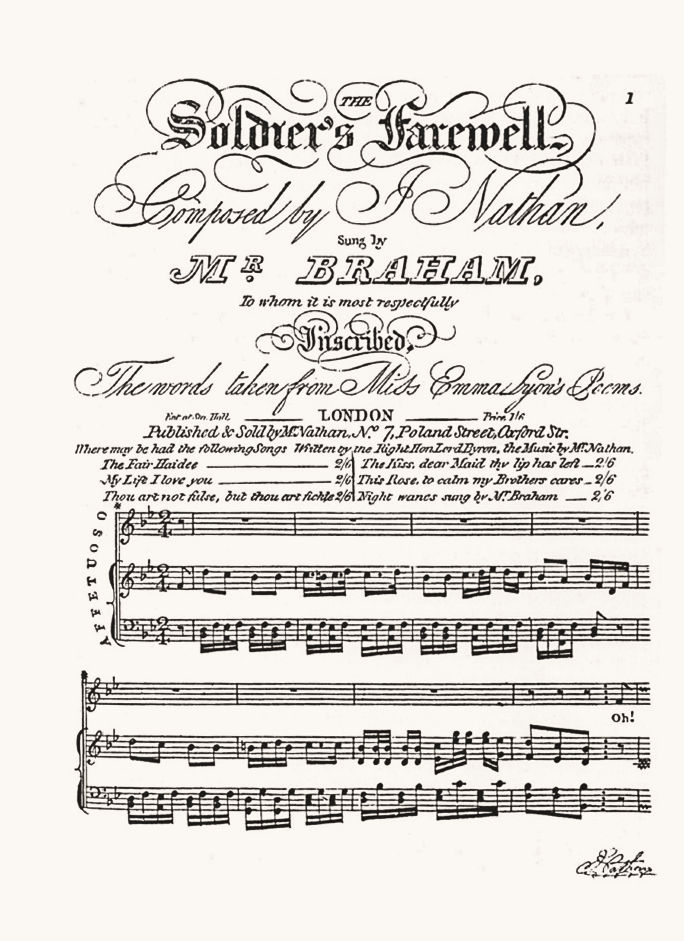
Isaac Nathan's The Soldier's Farewell, a musical adaption of Lyon's poems

Sometime before 1812, Lyon's father developed cataracts, becoming blind and unable to work. In an attempt to ease her family's financial troubles, Lyon published Miscellaneous Poems (1812) by subscription. The collection was dedicated to Princess Charlotte of Wales, who was one of the subscribers to the work, together with her father, the Prince Regent, afterwards King George IV, the Duke of Kent, and the Duke of Cambridge. Other subscribers included Masters and Wardens of Oxbridge colleges, academics, clergyman, and peers, from as far away as Suriname, West Indies. The volume chiefly of short odes, with some few sonnets, and stanzas on various subjects. Several of her poems were set to music by Isaac Nathan and performed on the London stage by tenor John Braham.

On the weekend of 13–14 June 1812, Lyon was assaulted by one William Simmons, who lived in the same building as her in London. Lyon's Hebrew student, barrister Daniel French, to whom she had dedicated a poem in her collection, intervened on her behalf. French was battered by Simmons and his friend Squires, who were later sentenced to six months in prison.

Lyon married merchant Abraham Henry (1789–1840) in 1816. After her marriage, she continued to write occasional poems, which were recited at public institutions, such as the Jews' Hospital, Jews' Free School, and Society of Friends of Foreigners In Distress. None of her manuscript poems, however, are known to have survived.

=== Death and legacy ===
She died on 30 December 1870 at the age of 82. Lyon's youngest son, Michael Henry (1830–1875), was a prominent journalist and essayist, who served as editor of the Jewish Chronicle from 1867 until his death. Her granddaughter Lucy Henry (1852–1898) was a children's writer, and her grandson Alfred Henry (1853–1939) was the founder of the accounting firm Jeffreys Henry.

== Bibliography ==
- Lyon, Emma (1812). Miscellaneous Poems. Oxford: J. Bartlett – via Online Archive of California.
