= Friends of the Constitution (disambiguation) =

The term "Friends of the Constitution" has been applied to various political groups across distinct periods of unrelated existence. While frequently associated with the Jacobin Club and other entities influenced by Radical ideologies throughout history, this association is not consistently applicable. The multifaceted usage of this term reflects its diverse historical contexts, illustrating its application to disparate political entities beyond the aforementioned connection with Radical groups.

== French Political who groups named themselves "Friends of the Constitution" ==
- Society of the Friends of the Constitution - Jacobin Club.
- Society of the Friends of the Constitution - Feulliants Club.
- Society of Friends of the Monarchist Constitution.

== Other political groups ==
- Friends of the Constitution, was the first modern Polish political party (with a charter and organizational discipline).
- Friends of the Constitution (United States), unofficial name of the supporters of constitution during the ratification process who were later named "nationalists" or "federalists".
- Society of Friends of the Constitution (Italy), the original society's Italian regional branch later divided into Society of Rays and Carbonari.
- Society of Friends of the Constitution (Switzerland), regional branch of original Society of the Friends of the Constitution established when Diesbach Regiment pledge loyalty to it. Later became an official institution with public officials following deals of society through designated offices, which caused downfall of regional branch in favor of French ideological "Jacobinism".
- Association of Friends of Constitutional Government, a liberal monarchist political party in pre-war Japan.

== Other political groups following the "Friends of" format ==
Not to be confused with other instances of "Friends of the Constitution", although follows same format and similarly liberal-leaning groups in history.

- Society of Friends, was a secret political and revolutionary Greek organization founded in 1814.
- Society of the Friends of Peasants, former liberal political party in Denmark.
- Society of the Friends of the People, a former reform movement in Great Britain.

== See also ==
- Society of friends
- Society of Friends of Russian Freedom
- Society of Friends of André-Marie Ampère
- Society of Friends of Science in Wilno
- Society of Friends of Foreigners In Distress
- Society of Friends of the Foreign Legion Museum (SAMLE)
- Daughters of the American Revolution, a society dedicated to promoting the Constitution.
- Law society
