= Mike Henry =

Mike Henry may refer to:

- Mike Henry (American football) (1936–2021), American football player and actor
- Mike Henry (voice actor) (born 1965)
- Mike Henry (politician) (born 1935), Jamaican politician
- Mike Henry (businessman), Canadian businessman

== See also ==
- Michael Henry (disambiguation)
