= Anna Pavlovna of Russia =

Queen of the Netherlands from 1840 to 1849

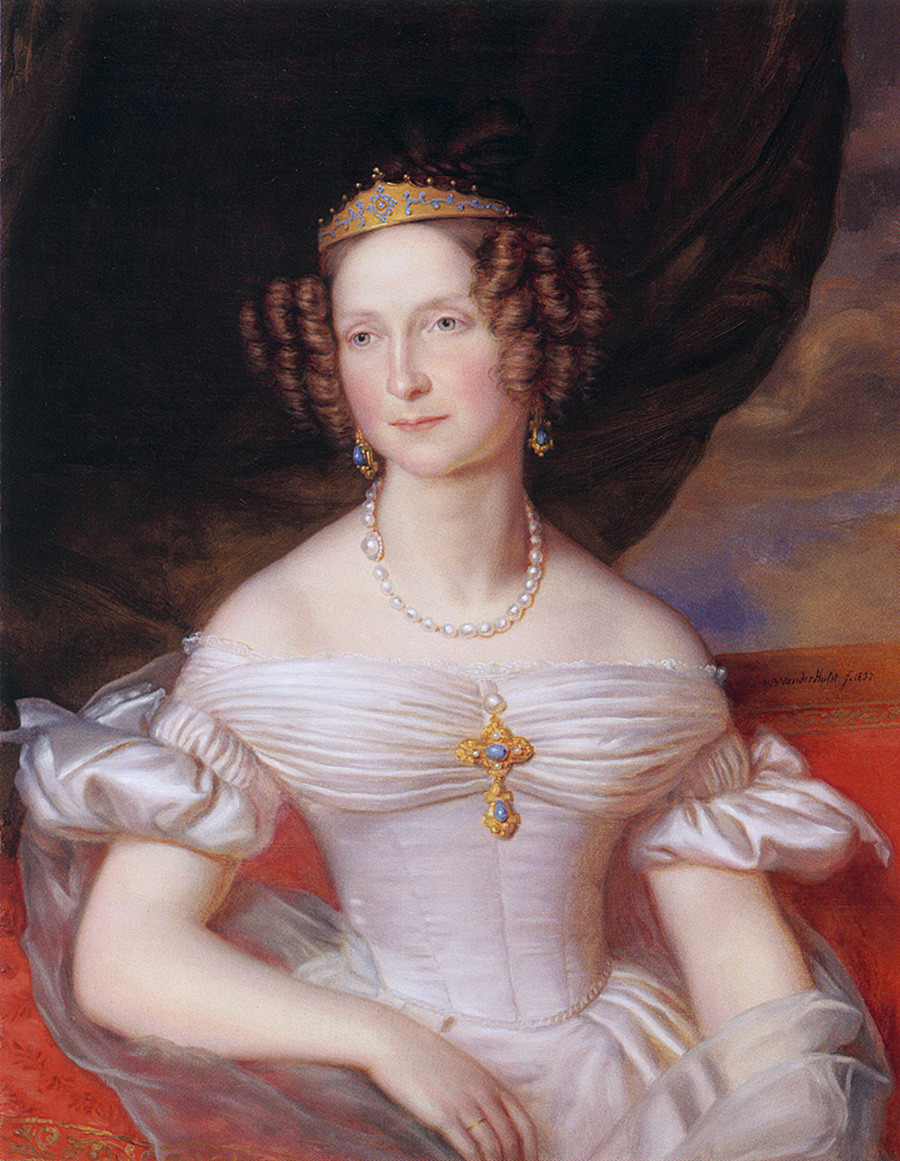
- 1837 portrait

Queen consort of the Netherlands Grand Duchess consort of Luxembourg Duchess consort of Limburg
- Tenure: 7 October 1840 – 17 March 1849
- Born: 18 January 1795; Saint Petersburg, Russia
- Died: 1 March 1865 (aged 70); The Hague, Netherlands
- Burial: Nieuwe Kerk, Delft
- Spouse: William II of the Netherlands (m. 1816; died 1849)
- Issue: William III of the Netherlands; Prince Alexander; Prince Henry; Prince Ernest Casimir; Sophie, Grand Duchess of Saxe-Weimar-Eisenach
- House: Holstein-Gottorp-Romanov; Orange-Nassau (by marriage)
- Father: Paul I of Russia
- Mother: Sophie Dorothea of Württemberg

Anna Pavlovna of Russia (Russian: Анна Павловна [ˈanːə ˈpavləvnə]; Dutch: Anna Paulowna [ˈɑnaː pɑˈloːnaː]; 18 January [O.S. 7 January] 1795 – 1 March 1865) was Queen of the Netherlands by marriage to King William II of the Netherlands. She was a Russian patriot who upheld a strict royal etiquette in the Netherlands, where she never felt at home, and identified more as an imperial Russian grand duchess than a Dutch queen. She had no political influence, but was active within charity. She is the paternal grandmother of Wilhelmina of the Netherlands, via her eldest son, William III.

== Youth ==
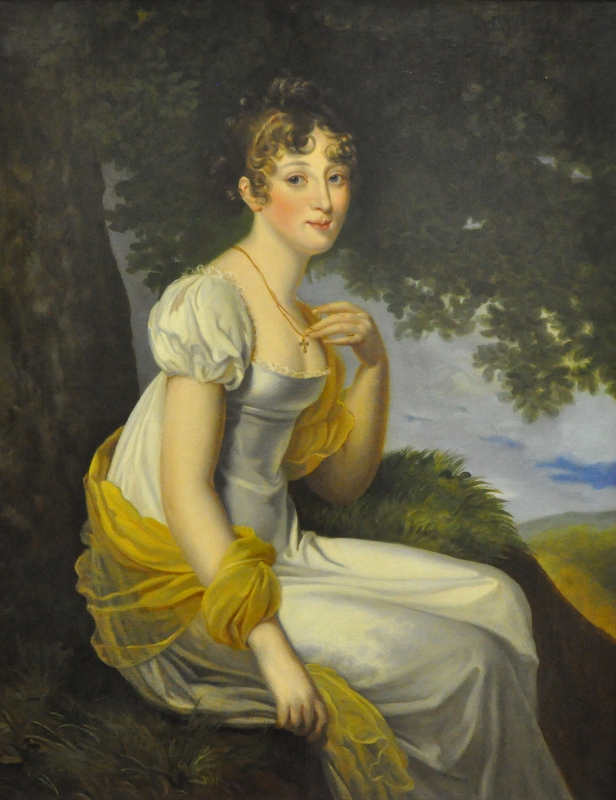
Grand Duchess Anna Pavlovna of Russia, circa 1813

Anna Pavlovna was born in 1795 at Gatchina Palace, the eighth child and sixth daughter of Paul I of Russia and Empress Maria Feodorovna (born Sophie Dorothea of Württemberg), and thus was Her Imperial Highness Grand Duchess Anna Pavlovna of Russia. Following the death of Anna's paternal grandmother, Catherine the Great, in 1796, her father became the emperor, but was deposed and killed in 1801, when she was six years old. Anna Pavlovna's brother Alexander succeeded to the throne.

Anna was raised by her mother at the summer residence of the Romanovs, Tsarskoye Selo. She spent her childhood there with her two younger brothers, Nicholas (1796–1855) and Michael. Anna was tutored by the Swiss governess Louise de Sybourg ('Bourcis') and received a broad education, including foreign languages (Russian, German and French) and mathematics. She was good at handicrafts and painting.

Anna had a good relationship with her brother, the Emperor Alexander, but she was closest to her mother and to her two younger brothers, the future Emperor Nicholas and Grand Duke Michael, with whom she was to correspond by letters her whole life after leaving Russia. After the death of her mother in 1828, she came to rely greatly on Nicholas, who responded by giving her all sorts of favors when he became emperor in 1825. She had a fairly good relationship with her sister Maria as well, but the relationship between Anna and her sister Catherine (Ekaterina) was never a good one.

In 1809, Emperor Napoleon I of France asked for Anna's hand in marriage after failing to secure her elder sister Ekaterina as a potential bride. Her mother managed to delay her reply long enough for Napoleon to lose interest and to marry Archduchess Marie Louise, the eighteen-year-old daughter of the Austrian emperor, in 1810. Other suitors were Charles Ferdinand, Duke of Berry (a prospective Bourbon heir to the French throne), and the British Duke of Clarence and St Andrews.

== Marriage ==
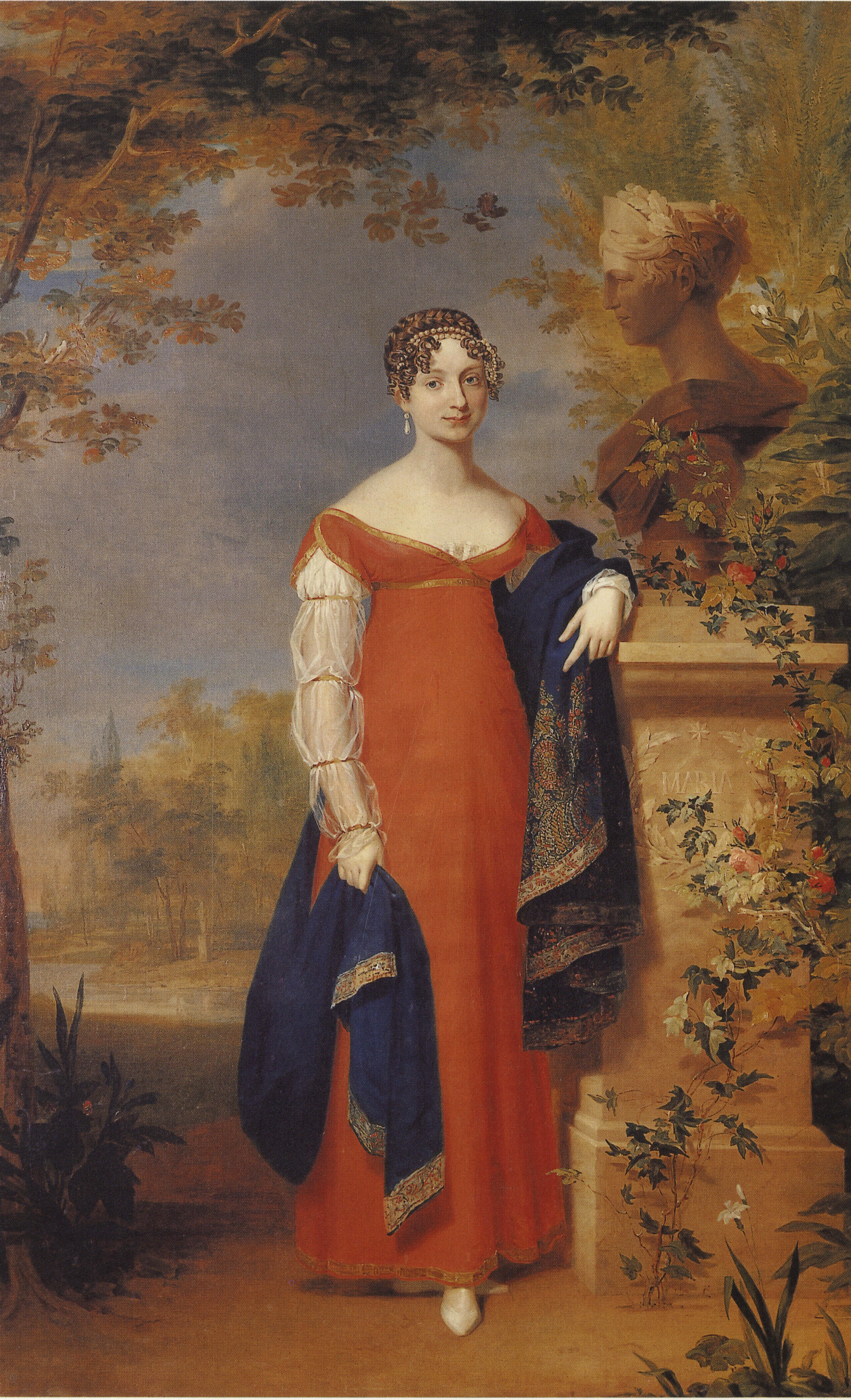
1824–1825 portrait of Pavlovna by George Dawe

On 21 February 1816 at the Grand Church of the Winter Palace in St Petersburg, she married the Prince of Orange, who would later become King William II of the Netherlands. The marriage had been suggested by her brother the Tsar Alexander I in 1815, as a symbol of the alliance created after the Congress of Vienna. Since Peter the Great had decided that no member of the Romanov family should be forced to marry against their will, William was invited to Russia before the wedding so that Anna could get to know him and consent to marry him, which she did, as she was pleased with him with the exception of his birth, which she considered inferior to hers. At the time of their marriage, it was agreed that Prince Willem's children should be raised as Protestants, although Anna herself remained Russian Orthodox. Alexander Pushkin celebrated the marriage in a special poem entitled To the Prince of Orange. The couple remained in Russia for one year. She was given a dowry of one million roubles, and her governess Bourcis accompanied her to the Netherlands.

== Crown Princess ==
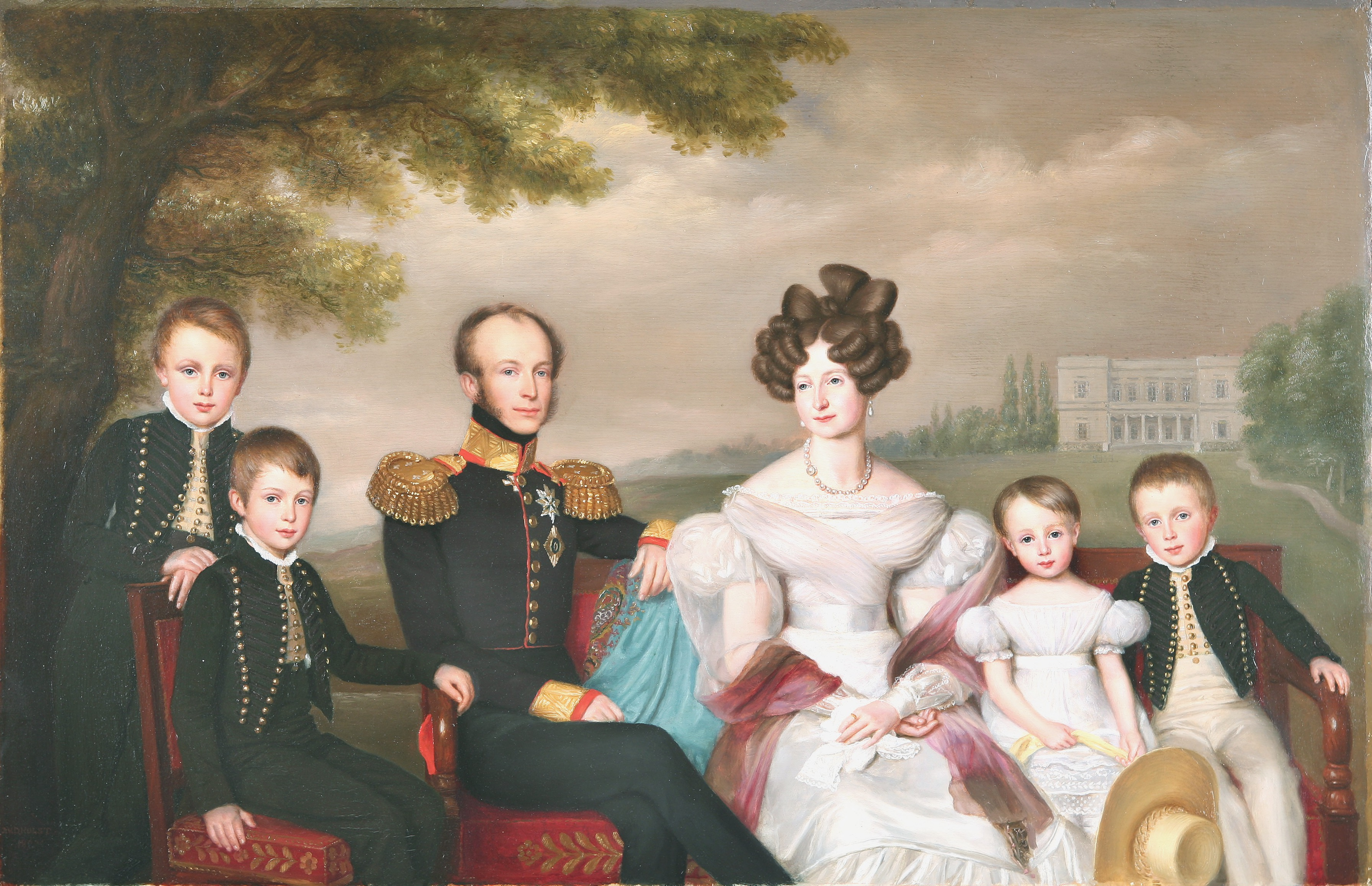
The royal family by Van der Hulst

In the Netherlands, Anna and William were given the Kneuterdijk Palace and Soestdijk Palace as their residence. Anna Pavlovna was shocked over the differences between Russia and her new home country, as the distance between royalty and commoners as well as between the aristocracy and the rest of society was much more egalitarian in the Netherlands than in her native Russia, and she had difficulties adjusting herself to this.

During the United Kingdom of the Netherlands, the future Belgium was also a part of the same monarchy. Anna and William preferred Brussels to the Netherlands and lived there until the Belgian Revolution forced them to leave in 1830. They lived in the Hof van Brabant until the fire of 1820, after which they were given a new residence in Brussels. William preferred Brussels partially because of his bad relationship with his father the king. Anna liked Brussels much more than the north, as the French aristocratic society in the less egalitarian Brussels reminded her much more of the court life in her native Saint Petersburg than the egalitarian and more simple and Spartan court life of The Hague. She was also popular among the Belgian nobility and high society, who were to remain loyal to the House of Orange in the first years after the declaration of Belgian independence.

The 1820s were dominated by the birth of her children. She had a good relationship with Henry and Sophie, but her favorite was Alexander. Anna was convinced he had no faults, as proven by a letter she wrote to her brother Nicholas in 1839. In truth, however, the relationship between her and the freedom loving, easy going Alexander could be tempestuous. When Anna insisted he accompany her on a journey to Italy in 1846, Alexander complained of being dragged off like a monkey in a cage. Anna's capriciousness and angry outbursts left him exasperated at times and caused several major rows. Although Alexander was not the perfectly compliant, obedient son his mother made him out to be (especially in letters to her Russian family), his death at age 29 in 1848 was a heavy blow for her. She mourned him intensely for the rest of her life and hung on to many of his possessions. Anna focused her attention on her eldest son William because of his position as heir. William, like his mother, was capricious and hot headed. Her relationship with him was strained, especially after his marriage, which she strongly disapproved of. Comments in her letters suggest that she tried to dominate and influence him, though she did not quite succeed.

Her marriage was stormy. From the beginning, Anna considered herself superior in rank to William. In 1829, several pieces of her jewellery were stolen in Brussels, and she suspected her spouse of having stolen them, as he was at the time in debt and mixing with people she considered to be questionable. The adultery of her spouse created conflicts between them.

The Belgian Revolution forced both Anna and William to leave their home in Brussels and relocate to the Netherlands. During the revolution William and his father the king had different opinions on how to deal with the revolution, and Anna acted as mediator to ease the tension between them. This was the only occasion when Anna became involved in political affairs. She showed support to her spouse in public, and accompanied him when his father exiled him to Willemsdorp near Moerdijk.

After 1830 Anna stayed in the Netherlands as crown princess, and focused on this role. During her time in the Netherlands, she studied the Dutch language, history and culture, and founded more than fifty orphanages. Anna spoke French with her spouse, as French was the international language of the European aristocracy, but she was tutored in the Dutch language by Arie van der Spuij, and came to speak better Dutch than William. She considered it her duty to fulfil her public role as a royal woman and charity was a part of this role: she founded the commissiën van weldadigheid ("charity commission") in Soest and Baarn, and the Koninklijke Winternaaischool Scheveningen, a school in needlework for poor women and girls, and gave financial contributions to the schools Anna Paulowna and Sophiaschool. During the Belgian Revolution, she founded the hospital Willemshospitaal in The Hague for wounded soldiers, whom she visited. After the death of her mother-in-law in 1837, she took over the protection of the charity organization 'moedergenootschappen' ('mother foundations').

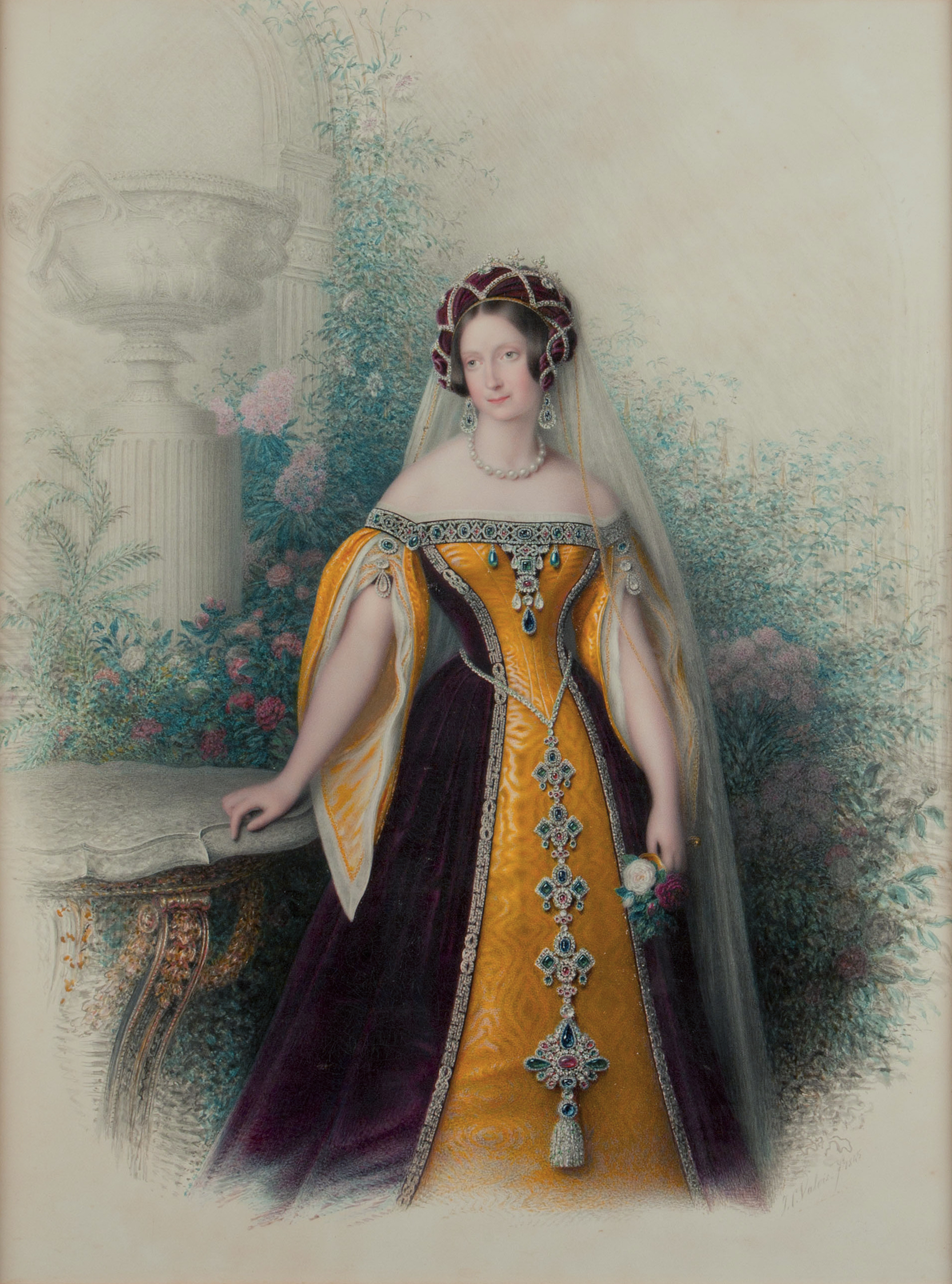
Anna Paulowna in historic dress at a costume ball (Jean Chrétien Valois, 1845)

== Queen ==
On 7 October 1840, on the abdication of her father-in-law William I of the Netherlands, she became queen consort of the Netherlands, and her husband was inaugurated in the Nieuwe Kerk, Amsterdam. Anna attended his inauguration in a dress of silver cloth.

As queen, Anna was described as dignified, proud and distant toward the public. She wished to be respected for having performed her role in accordance to duty. She valued ceremonial court etiquette and royal representation, and the Dutch court was reportedly given more of a "royal allure" than before. Anna Pavlovna was described as a tall, stately woman with a majestic appearance who was proud and always identifying with her rank as an Imperial Grand Duchess, she never gave up her Imperial rank and was as a strict follower of etiquette and ceremony. Anna was acknowledged to be a talented and intelligent person who quickly mastered a new language as well as being well informed and with a clear understanding of contemporary politics. She was also a strong willed character with a noted temperament, which could cause outbursts and result in her refusing to leave her rooms for days, referred to as her "nerves". She was also deeply devoted to her mother and her two younger brothers and their family affairs.

Anna Pavlovna corresponded with her mother and brothers in Russia and remained a strong Russian patriot her entire life. It has been said of her that she remained a Russian Grand Duchess more than she ever became queen of the Netherlands. She had a Russian Orthodox private chapel in her private quarters, and had her own priest and Russian choir boys to serve her. She kept her Orthodox religion and continued to live in accordance with Russian custom (albeit in her case the French influenced Russian aristocratic version) and sometimes appeared in Russian national costume. Her correspondence as well as the diary of her courtier Baron Mackay van Ophemert illustrated that she was well informed and held clear political opinions, though she was never involved in politics or expressed any political views in public.

== Queen dowager ==
King William II struggled with ill health during the late 1840s. His complaints were further worsened by unhealthy habits (such as overexerting himself physically and constant smoking), worry over the unstable political situation at home and abroad and concern over the rapidly deteriorating health of his son Alexander. In the summer of 1847 it was clear his heart condition would soon become fatal. William's health rapidly worsened in the winter of 1849 and he died on the 17th of March. Anna came to Tilburg when he was on his death bed, but was not allowed into the sick room for fear of upsetting her dying husband. Instead, she listened at the door. When he had died, she threw herself on the lifeless body in flouts of tears. William's sudden death was reportedly a shock to Anna. He died with large debts and his bookkeeping in total disarray. Anna was forced to sell some of her own possessions in order to keep her preferred residence, the Soestdijk Palace. She made Soestdijk into a shrine in memory of her deceased husband and son Alexander.

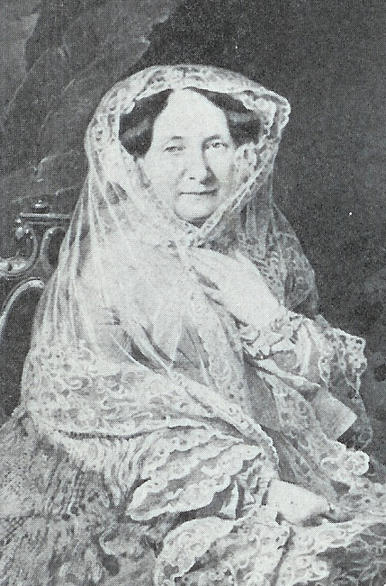
Photograph of Queen Anna, 1855

As queen dowager, Anna left the royal palace, retired from court life and lived a private life. Her relationship with her son King William III was always tense and she once said contemptuously about him that he was lucky to be a king of a constitutional empire. She did not get along with her daughter-in-law and niece Sophie, whom her son had married against her will. She was the daughter of the sister she liked the least, Catherine. Allegedly Anna was jealous of Catherine's beauty and status as their mother's favorite child. She had a better relationship to her two younger children, but as they were abroad her last years were lonely. She considered returning to Russia after a conflict with her son in 1855, but in the end, she did not.

Anna died on 1 March 1865, at the age of 70.

== Children ==
Anna and William II of the Netherlands had five children:

- William III of the Netherlands (1817–1890). Married firstly Sophie of Württemberg and secondly Emma of Waldeck and Pyrmont, had 3 sons from the first marriage and 1 daughter from the second.
- William Alexander Frederick Constantine Nicholas Michael "Sasha" of the Netherlands (1818–1848). Unmarried, had no issue.
- William Frederick Henry "the Navigator" of the Netherlands (1820–1879). Married firstly Amalia of Saxe-Weimar-Eisenach and secondly Marie of Prussia, but had no issue.
- Prince William Alexander Frederick Ernest Casimir of the Netherlands (May - October 1822).
- Wilhelmina Marie Sophie Louise of the Netherlands (1824–1897). Married Karl Alexander, Grand Duke of Saxe-Weimar-Eisenach had 1 son and 3 daughters.

== Legacy ==
The municipality Anna Paulowna in the Dutch province of North Holland is named after her.

The genus of trees Paulownia was coined by the German botanist Philipp Franz von Siebold to honour Anna Pavlovna. The common name of Paulownia tomentosa is Royal Paulownia, (also known as Empress Tree, Princess Tree, and Foxglove Tree.

== Ancestry ==
Ancestors of Anna Pavlovna of Russia

8. Charles Frederick, Duke of Holstein-Gottorp
4. Peter III of Russia
9. Grand Duchess Anna Petrovna of Russia
2. Paul I of Russia
10. Christian August, Prince of Anhalt-Zerbst
5. Catherine II of Russia
11. Princess Johanna Elisabeth of Holstein-Gottorp
1. Anna Pavlovna of Russia
12. Charles Alexander, Duke of Württemberg
6. Frederick II Eugene, Duke of Württemberg
13. Princess Marie Auguste of Thurn and Taxis
3. Duchess Sophie Dorothea of Württemberg
14. Frederick William, Margrave of Brandenburg-Schwedt
7. Princess Friederike of Brandenburg-Schwedt
15. Princess Sophia Dorothea of Prussia

Anna Pavlovna of Russia House of Holstein-Gottorp-Romanov Born: 18 January 1795 Died: 1 March 1865
Royal titles
Vacant Title last held by Wilhelmine of Prussia	Queen consort of the Netherlands; Grand Duchess consort of Luxembourg; Duchess consort of Limburg; 1840–1849	Succeeded by Sophie of Württemberg
