= Michael Henry =

Michael Henry may refer to:

- Michael Henry (Alberta politician) (born 1955), former provincial level politician from Alberta, Canada
- Michael Henry (Jamaican politician) (born 1935)
- Michael Henry (journalist) (1835–1875), British journalist and mechanician
- Michael Danan Henry (born 1939), Buddhist
- Micheal Henry (born 1991), Nigerian footballer
- Michael Henry, of Michael Henry and Justin Robinett, an American music duo

== See also ==
- Mike Henry (disambiguation)
