= Marius Kloppers =

South African-born Australian businessman (born 1962)

- Born: Marius Jacques Kloppers; 26 August 1962 (age 64); Cape Town, South Africa
- Education: BE (Chem), MBA, PhD (Materials Science)
- Alma mater: University of Pretoria; MIT; INSEAD
- Occupation: Businessman
- Years active: 1986–present
- Title: Chief Executive, BHP Billiton
- Term: 2007–2013
- Predecessor: Chip Goodyear
- Successor: Andrew MacKenzie
- Spouse: Carin
- Children: 3

Marius Jacques Kloppers (born 26 August 1962) is a South African-born Australian businessman and former Chief Executive Officer of BHP Billiton, the world's largest mining company. He was also Executive Director and Chairman of the Group Management Committee from 2007 to 2013. He was asked to retire as CEO on 1 October 2013, and was succeeded by Andrew Mackenzie.

== Education ==
Kloppers graduated from Helpmekaar Kollege, then a public school in Johannesburg (IEB currently). Kloppers graduated with a Bachelor of Chemical Engineering from the University of Pretoria and subsequently went on to receive a PhD at Massachusetts Institute of Technology. He also graduated with an MBA from INSEAD.

== Career ==
Kloppers worked in petrochemicals at Sasol and materials research with Mintek in South Africa. Following completion of his MBA at INSEAD, he then worked with management consultants McKinsey & Company in the Netherlands before joining Billiton in 1993. In 2007, at the age of 44, he was appointed CEO of the largest resource company in the world, BHP Billiton. He officially assumed the position of CEO on 1 October 2007. In 2009 his annual compensation was $US 10,399,589, of which $2M was salary and the balance was bonus.

Business positions
Preceded by Chip Goodyear	CEO of BHP Billiton; 2007–2013	Succeeded by Andrew Mackenzie
