= Andrew Mackenzie (businessman) =

Scottish businessman (born 1956)

Sir Andrew Mackenzie FRS
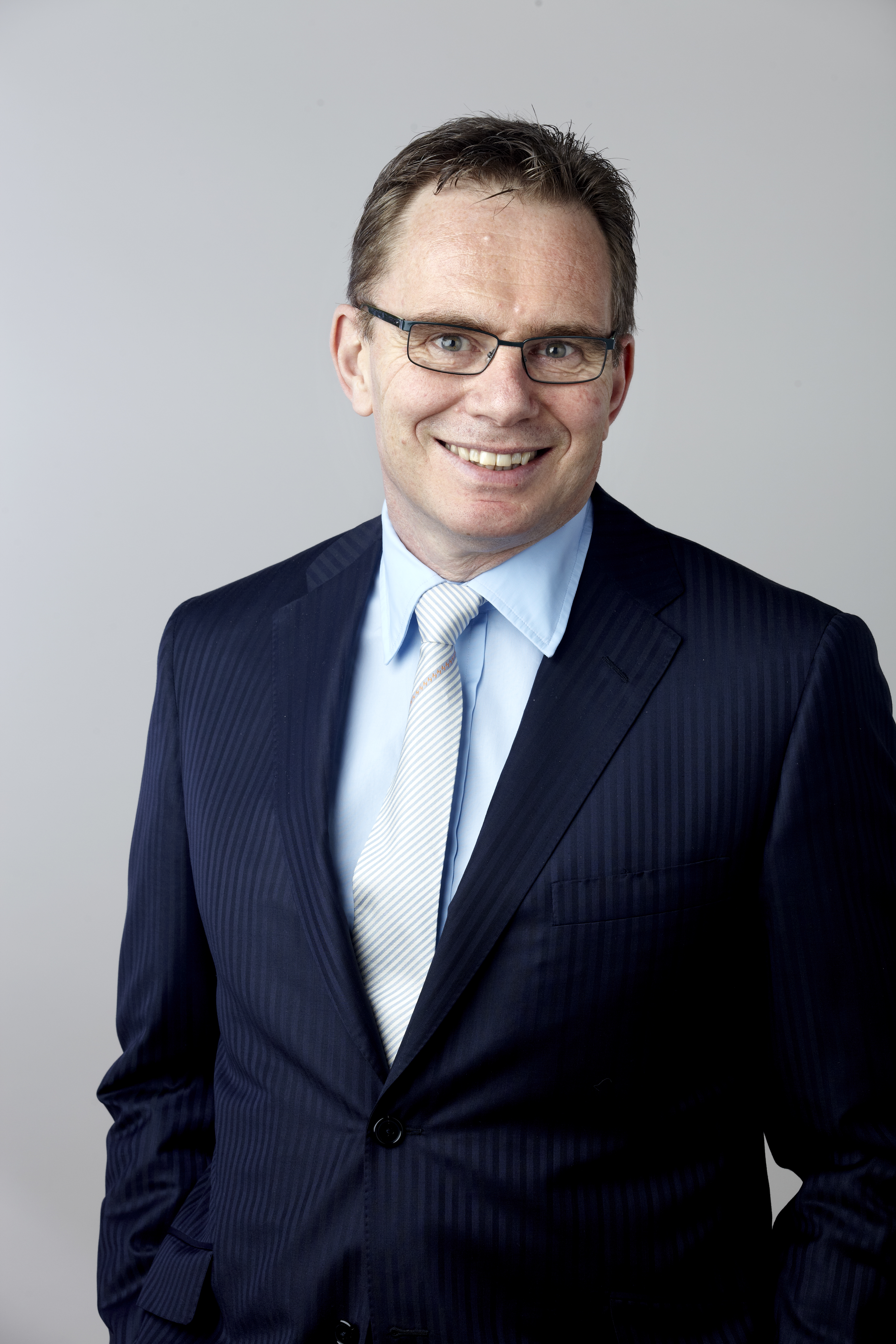
- Mackenzie in 2014
- Born: Andrew Stewart Mackenzie; 20 December 1956 (age 69); St Albans, England
- Education: University of St Andrews (BSc); University of Bristol (PhD)
- Occupations: Chairman – Shell plc and UK Research and Innovation
- Employers: BP; Rio Tinto; BHP
- Spouse: Liz Allan
- Children: 2

Academic background
- Thesis: Applications of biological marker compounds to subsurface geological processes (1981)

Sir Andrew Stewart Mackenzie FRS (born 20 December 1956) is a Scottish businessman, who is the chairman of Shell plc and UK Research and Innovation, and formerly CEO of BHP, the world's largest mining company. He succeeded Marius Kloppers, on 10 May 2013, and was succeeded by Mike Henry, at the start of 2020.

== Early life ==
Andrew Stewart Mackenzie was born in December 1956, grew up in Kirkintilloch, Scotland, and was educated at the University of St Andrews where he graduated with a first class bachelor's degree in geology in 1977. He went on to study at the University of Bristol where he was awarded a PhD in organic chemistry in 1981.

== Career ==
Mackenzie was a postdoctoral research fellow with the British Geological Society. He was a Humboldt fellow and worked at the Nuclear Research Centre in Jülich, Germany. He published over 50 research papers as a scientist.

In 1983, Mackenzie joined BP's research division. He worked his way to BP Finance, and then as head of capital markets. After 22 years at BP, he left as group vice-president petrochemicals.

In April 2004, Mackenzie joined Rio Tinto as chief executive of the industrial minerals division. In June 2007, he was the chief executive officer, diamonds & minerals.

He was a trustee of a think tank, Demos, from 2005 until June 2008.

Mackenzie was poached from Rio Tinto in 2007 by then CEO of BHP Billiton Marius Kloppers, ahead of a failed takeover bid of Rio Tinto. Mackenzie became the chief executive of non-ferrous in BHP Billiton in November 2008. He succeeded Marius Kloppers as the CEO of BHP Billiton in May 2013. In 2014, he was paid $7,123,000 in total compensation. Australia mining head Mike Henry succeeded Mackenzie as BHP CEO on 1 January 2020.

In March 2021, Mackenzie was tapped to replace Chad Holliday as company chair of Shell starting May 2021.

In June 2021, Mackenzie was selected to be Chair of UK Research and Innovation to replace John Kingman.

== Awards and honours ==
Mackenzie was elected a fellow of the Royal Society in 2014. His nomination reads

Andrew Mackenzie is one of the world's most influential applied earth scientists. He made seminal contributions to geochemistry in his early career, especially in relation to the formation of oil. For most of his career he has been a leader in the energy and mining industries working within BP, Rio Tinto and most recently in BHP Billiton. He has made major innovations in both technical and business arenas within these companies, and is pre-eminent as an earth scientist in the commercial world. He has recently been appointed CEO of BHP Billiton.

Mackenzie was knighted in the 2020 Birthday Honours for services to business, science, technology and UK/Australia relations.

== Personal life ==
Mackenzie speaks five languages. He met his wife, Liz Allan, when they were students at St Andrews. The couple have two daughters.

Business positions
Preceded by Marius Kloppers	CEO of BHP; 2013–2020	Succeeded by Mike Henry
