= Prince Alexander of the Netherlands =

Dutch prince (1818–1848)

Prince Alexander
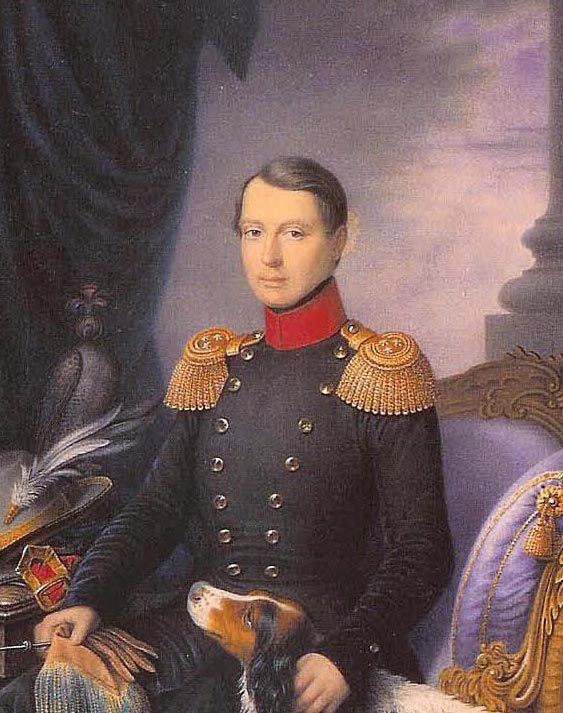
- Alexander in 1843
- Born: 2 August 1818; Soestdijk, Netherlands
- Died: 20 February 1848 (aged 29); Funchal, Portugal
Names
- William Alexander Frederick Constantine Nicholas Michael
- House: Orange-Nassau
- Father: William II of the Netherlands
- Mother: Anna Pavlovna of Russia

Prince Alexander of the Netherlands, Prince of Orange-Nassau (William Alexander Frederick Constantine Nicholas Michael, Dutch: Willem Alexander Frederik Constantijn Nicolaas Michiel, Prins der Nederlanden, Prins van Oranje-Nassau; 2 August 1818 – 20 February 1848) was born at Soestdijk Palace, the second son to King William II of The Netherlands and Queen Anna Paulovna, daughter of Tsar Paul I of Russia. He was nicknamed Sasha within his family.

== Biography ==
Prince Alexander was born on Sunday, 2 August 1818 at a quarter past ten in the morning. His birth was announced the next day in the Nederlandsche Staatscourant. To commemorate the birth of his second grandson William I of the Netherlands gave his daughter-in-law Anna Pavlovna the Czar Peter House in Zaandam, which had been inhabited by her ancestor Peter I of Russia during his stay in the Dutch Republic. Prince Alexander was christened on the forty-sixth birthday of his grandfather, 24 August 1818, by the Reverend Krieger in The Hague. The young Prince's paternal great-grandmother, Wilhelmina of Prussia, was present for the occasion. Alexander received the names of his father, his paternal uncle Prince Frederick of the Netherlands, and his maternal uncles Alexander I of Russia, Grand Duke Constantine Pavlovich of Russia, Nicholas I of Russia and Grand Duke Michael Pavlovich of Russia.

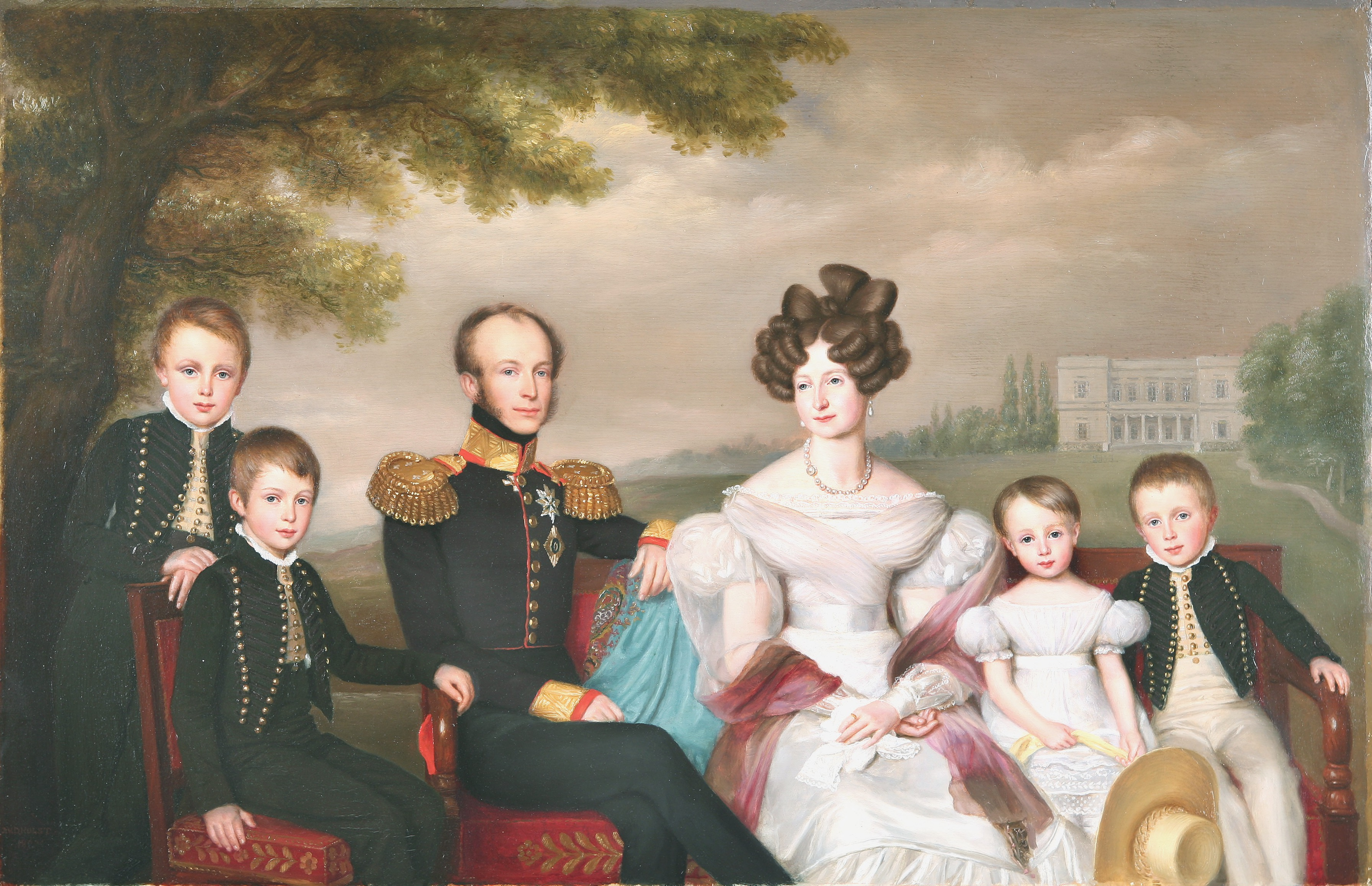
From left to right: William III, Alexander, William II, Anna Pavlovna, Sophie, and Henry

Alexander was educated together with his brother William III of the Netherlands, who was only eighteen months his senior. Their father, the Prince of Orange, thought the physical education of the boys particularly important. As such, they spent much time outdoors. The Prince of Orange actively partook in the upbringing of his children. On 22 October 1822 Anna Pavlovna wrote to her brother Constantine, "the two eldest are big boys and are receiving their first lessons. William started teaching them to read a year ago and now they have been entrusted to the care of a tutor who comes everyday to teach them. Papa teaches them Geography." The Princes William and Alexander later continued their studies at Leiden University, but neither of them showed a particular interest in academics.

Contemporary accounts suggest that Alexander was regarded by his parents as more suitable to rule than his brother William, who was described as difficult to manage from a young age. Emmeline Stuart Wortley, who met Alexander during the falconry season at Het Loo, wrote positively about his character. Alexander spent extended periods at Het Loo, where he took part in outdoor activities and socialized with an international circle of acquaintances. He maintained cordial relations with members of his family, including William and his sister-in-law Sophie of Wurttemberg, despite Sophie's strained relations with some of her in-laws.

Alexander had a lively, adventurous personality. According to his sister-in-law Sophie, he was tall, strong and rather handsome. He was no intellectual, but he did develop many interests, including numismatics, mechanical engineering, flora and fauna, military science and all kinds of sports. He was also fascinated by new technologies, as proven by the fact he was the first member of the House of Orange to have his photograph taken, and he also the first to own a bicycle. It is unclear whether he ever really attended a costume ball dressed from head to toe in shining armour, but he did don Highland Dress on several occasions.

Alexander was outdoorsy and lived a very active life. Among the sports he practiced were gymnastics, sailing, fishing, ice skating, dancing, sharp shooting, archery and horse riding. While on a visit to the United Kingdom in 1843 he was introduced to punt gunning, to which he immediately took a fancy. He contacted the then famous sportsman Colonel Peter Hawker, who secured him a gun. According to Hawker’s diary, Alexander killed 35 teal and 12 curlews with his first three shots. “A princely beginning”, Hawker concluded.

Alexander and his older brother William were taught to hunt by court physician Pierre Everard when they were teenagers. Both princes became passionate hunters. In 1839, their grandfather the King allowed the reinstatement of the old practice of falconry at Het Loo. The two brothers joined the new Royal Loo Hawking Club, with Alexander serving as chairman. Every year the falconry season drew a crowd of hunting enthusiasts (many of them British) to Het Loo. Apart from hunting the company also engaged in horse racing and shooting contests. Alexander was passionate about racing and he owned many precious racing horses (Queen Anna Pavlovna once gave him a horse brought from England for 4000 Dutch guilders). He eagerly participated in the horse racing as a jockey, despite his 6 foot 4 inch height. A letter to the Prince's father proves how seriously Alexander took his hunting activities, as he explained his absence from The Hague: "I so desire to stay at Het Loo, where the falconry is wonderful this year. You might disapprove of my behaviour and my decision, my dear father, but remember, beloved father, this is my only relaxation and the only pleasure I truly love." After Alexander's death the expensive sport came under increasing threat. The Royal Loo Hawking Club was rudderless without its enthusiastic chairman and the new king William III, Alexander’s brother, alienated himself from many of the members with his rude behaviour. The Club was finally disbanded in 1855.

During his short life, Alexander travelled extensively. This included two visits to the United Kingdom and long journeys to Italy and his mother's native country. On 23 July 1839, Alexander went to Russia to visit his maternal uncle, Tsar Nicholas I, accompanied by his mentor, Major Rigot de Begnins. He made a favourable impression on his uncle, who wrote to Anna Pavlovna: “I was pleased to meet your Alexander, who is really a very handsome boy, with such an excellent and decent appearance. I think he is more fortunate than his brothers, as far as his appearance is concerned.” On 7 September (O.S. 26 August) 1839, at a ceremony commemorating the anniversary of the Battle of Borodino, the Tsar named Alexander Chief of the Novorossiysk Dragoon Regiment. Anna Pavlovna was thrilled to see her son so well received at her brother’s court. On 3 October she wrote to Tsar Nicholas thanking him for his kindness to Alexander: "How I should thank you, dear friend, for the gifts you have bestowed upon my son Alexander and for the flattering honour you so mercifully bestowed upon him by making him the head of a regiment of your army. May he once deserve the honour to be taken up in the ranks of such an army! May he be worth it!" Like his father, Alexander occasionally appeared at court in Russian uniform.

In 1843, at the invitation of his friend, the Duke of Leeds, Alexander spent several months in England and Scotland. After the obligatory visit to Queen Victoria, he extensively toured the Scottish Highlands, where he greatly enjoyed his freedom and the relaxed, casual atmosphere. Once described as “one of the best sportsmen of the present day”, he actively engaged in outdoor pursuits such as riding, shooting, hiking and fishing. During the Highland Games at Inverness Alexander placed third in the sharpshooting contest, his best shot from 25 yards only missing the target by a quarter of an inch. Both at the Highland Games and at several balls, Alexander appeared in full Highland Dress. According to a contemporary newspaper “his erect figure and handsome limbs did no discredit to the garb of "Old Gael". While in Britain he also stayed at the country estates of the Duke of Richmond, the Duke of Northumberland and Queen Adelaide.

In 1846, Alexander had received another invitation for a lengthy stay in Scotland. However, he was forced to accompany his mother on her journey to Italy. Alexander much resented this, complaining he was being dragged on a stupid trip like a monkey in a cage. The company left Rotterdam on 26 August 1846 and arrived at Domodossola on 11 September. At the end of the month they reached Genoa where Prince Henry's ship lay moored. The travel journal Alexander kept (which ended up in the Weimar state archives and for a long time has been incorrectly attributed to his sister Sophie), shows he had great difficulty putting up with Anna Pavlovna’s foul moods and capriciousness. One of the things mother and son seem to have strongly disagreed about, was Alexander’s amorous attachment to Anna Pavlovna’s lady-in-waiting Otheline van Tuyll van Serooskerken. Alexander spent his time in Italy going sightseeing at a killer pace. He greatly desired to continue on to Rome, but his mother was reluctant and only agreed after a lot of persuading. On 9 October the company reached the eternal city. They visited Pope Pius IX, whom both Alexander and his mother found very pleasant. Alexander returned to The Netherlands in November 1847, shortly before he fell fatally ill.

As an adult, Prince Alexander lived rather modestly. Aide-de-camp Eliza Pieter Matthes in 1842 described the prince's home behind the Kloosterkerk as "rather small for a prince", but the interior was "charming." In 1844, King William II bought a more suitable accommodation for his son. He chose the Villa Boschlust, just outside The Hague, which had sat empty since the death of its builder Johannes van den Bosch. Alexander relocated to villa Boschlust in 1845, but stayed for only two years, until his departure to Madeira. After his death the villa was inherited by his parents. Anna Pavlovna stayed at Boschlust for a short time after the death of her husband, because she could no longer bear living at her former home, Kneuterdijk Palace, without him. After the Queen dowager had left Boschlust, the estate was sold to a Rotterdam wine merchant in March 1851. Villa Boschlust and the large park surrounding it were demolished shortly after 1888 in favour of a residential area.

=== Career ===
As the Prince of Orange's second son, Alexander was destined for a career in the army. On 2 August 1828, his tenth birthday, he received the rank of colonel by Royal Order. That same day his father gifted him his first horse. Alexander would prove to be a great horse lover and an expert horseman. As such, he was marked out for a career as a cavalry officer. He started his training at 20 years old in 1839 and spent part of it with the dragoons in Tilburg. That same year his grandfather William I assigned him the rank of Major General and placed him at the head of the brigade of heavy cavalry stationed in Leiden. Alexander stayed in Leiden for one year only, until his father ascended the throne, promoted him to Lieutenant-General and assigned him the purely ceremonial role of Inspector-General of Cavalry. The Prince was very unhappy with this decision and for years to come would lament his inability to earn his stripes and be in real contact with the troops whose uniforms he was forced to wear. Alexander never saw any action as a soldier. With his father and brother William, he joined the campaign against Belgium in 1833-4. but he was too young to actually participate in any fighting. Although his position as Inspector of Cavalry was ceremonial, Alexander took it very seriously. Eliza Pieter Matthes, aide-de-camp to King William II, recalled a conversation he had with the Prince: "I had the impression he was quite knowledgeable about that weapon [the Cavalry]. It is a shame he is only our Inspector-General in name, we would not be worse off if he would be so effectively." Prince Alexander held the position of Inspector-General from 1840 until his death. The Regiment Huzaren Prins Alexander was named for him.

Alexander does not seem to have aspired to a political career, but during the 1840s some attempts were made to secure him one. In 1841, newspaper speculation had him becoming governor of Luxembourg. During the fall of 1844, king William II proposed naming Alexander governor-general of the Dutch East Indies. “It was only an incidental thought of mine”, he told his Minister of Colonies, Jean Chrétien Baud, who protested. “Alexander doesn’t know anything about it. He is a righteous and knowledgeable young person. It would be a sacrifice to me letting him leave for the Indies, but I would think the nation would interpret that sacrifice as proof of my great interest in the Indies and as such would approve of it.” In the end, Alexander did not receive the commission. It is unclear whether his father ever informed him about the plan.

=== Marriage prospects ===
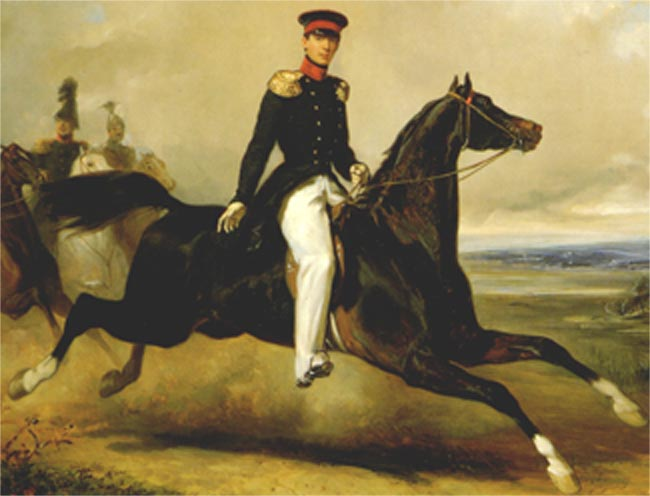
Alexander was an excellent horseman

In the late 1830s, William IV of the United Kingdom wished to marry Alexander to his niece Princess Alexandrina Victoria of Kent (and future Queen of the United Kingdom). Nothing came of this however, as Victoria remarked to her uncle Leopold I of Belgium, "The Netherlander boys are very plain and have a mixture of Kalmuck (Mongol) and Dutch in their faces, moreover they look heavy, dull, and frightened and are not at all prepossessing. So much for the Oranges, dear Uncle."

Leopold and the Orange-Nassau family were heavily at odds with each other over the independence of Belgium, which the Dutch government still had not formally accepted. Victoria was well aware neither Leopold nor her mother wanted her to marry Alexander. As for Alexander, he does not seem to have had any interest in Victoria whatsoever. He kept an expansive journal during his journey to England, in which he never expressed any opinion about her. There seems to be little contemporary evidence to support the theory that Alexander was considered as a possible husband for Queen Isabella II of Spain. Their 12 year age difference and his Protestantism make the match highly unlikely. In 1842 however, Alexander’s father did try to marry him off to the French princess Clémentine of Orleans. Her father Louis Philippe opposed the match because of Alexander’s protestant religion and age (he was over a year younger than Clementine).

Alexander never married or fathered any known children. His sister-in-law Princess Sophie thought he had no interest in women, as she wrote to Lady Malet on 4 May 1847: "I am in pleasant company with Prince Alexander [...] It is not that he courts me, for he does not yet know what a woman is, but he gives me all friendship he is able to give." Sophie even attributed Alexander’s premature death to “his singular austerity”, by which she meant his celibate lifestyle. The travel journal Alexander kept in Italy in 1846 clearly indicates he did have feelings for at least one woman, namely one of his mother’s ladies in waiting. In the past Alexander's unmarried state was often attributed to his alleged poor health. However, contemporary sources show him to have enjoyed a robust constitution until a year before his death. It is therefore more likely he remained unmarried because of his father’s ambitious, unrealistic marital policy and/or his own disinterest in the candidates deemed suitable for him.

=== Declining health and death ===
For a long time the consensus among historians has been that Alexander never fully recovered from the accident he was involved in at a young age. During a storm in November 1836, 18-year-old Alexander was hit by a falling tree, which knocked him unconscious and pinned him to the forest floor. He sustained a bruised chest and a serious concussion, which for a while caused great alarm at court. Alexander's resulting frail constitution was supposed to have left him vulnerable to pulmonary tuberculosis, which caused him to steadily waste away until he died at the age of 29. One of the most commonly cited sources is Charlotte Disbrowe, daughter of the British diplomat sir Edward Cromwell Disbrowe, who wrote over 50 years after Alexander’s death: "Prince Alexander, a very fine young man, born in 1818, was evidently failing in health. Whether he had been injured in any way by the tree that fell on him, or whether he had done harm to himself by trying to reduce himself to jockey weight, I know not, but he was six feet four inches in height, the latter experience would have needed vigorous treatment. Often when dancing with him I noticed how breathless he was, and how the perspiration stood out in beads on his forehead, and I wished I had the courage to beg him to stop." Another much used source is Alexander’s sister-in-law Sophie, whose memoirs also blamed Alexander’s illness on extreme weight loss remedies in order to achieve more success at horse racing. She however thought he suffered from a stomach ailment instead of consumption as diagnosed by court physician Everard. The surviving doctor's reports, letters and autopsy in the Dutch Royal Archives clearly prove Alexander did not suffer from a lingering pulmonary illness at all. His health problems were first reported around March 1847, when Alexander felt fatigued and had lost a lot of weight. In addition, he had a persistent dry cough, a swollen gland in his armpit and he suffered from night sweats. Court physician Everard diagnosed him with consumption and recommended the healthy forest air of the Veluwe region for his affected lungs. Throughout that year Alexander remained weak, tired and ill. The struggle with his failing health made him very short-tempered and moody. A quarrel with his adjutant ran so high that this Baron Sloet van Oldruitenborgh resigned in July 1847.

As there were no clear signs of recovery, plans were made that summer for Alexander to spend the winter at Madeira. He agreed to go only when he received permission to take a long pleasure trip across the Mediterranean afterwards. According to the original plans, Alexander should have left in early October. However, at that time he was deathly ill and in no condition to travel. In addition to the symptoms he was already showing, he had developed severe intestinal complaints. Finally, he recovered sufficiently to embark on 1 November. The steamers Cerberus and Cyclops towed the frigate Prince of Orange, commanded by Alexander's brother Henry, beyond the Channel. This stage was followed by a stormy, nearly three-week voyage to Madeira. Alexander spent most of the journey in his hammock.

On the island, Alexander moved into the villa of the Quinta da Levada estate. In rare letters to his mother he claimed to benefit from the mild climate, but he seems to have painted a very rosy picture of his condition. "Poor Alexander is still in a pitiful state", wrote his chief of staff Victor de Constant Rebecque. "During the first few days of his stay here, his condition did not improve. His dysentery resumed and he was so weak that he was still unable to walk and could only eat with great difficulty." In order to still benefit from the healing climate, Alexander was carried outside daily to rest for a few hours in a hammock or on a day bed. According to Constant he still had a horrible temper. At the same time as Alexander, Queen Adelaide was also staying in Madeira. They had known each other since 1836, and it was her physician, Sir David Davies, who treated him. Davies disagreed with the diagnosis made by Everard. He concluded that Alexander suffered from severe anaemia and functional disorders of the kidneys, stomach and liver. He treated Alexander for symptoms such as severe stomach pain and the diarrhea that had plagued him since at least October. The patient’s condition continued to deteriorate steadily. For almost the entire month of January 1848, Alexander was bedridden. Then there seemed to be signs of recovery. At the end of that month he wrote to his father that he thought he would soon be on his feet again. The improvement, however, was short-lived. Three weeks later Alexander was dying. His greatly alarmed father William II sent Everard to Madeira with the utmost haste, but it was to no avail. Alexander was emaciated and exhausted from the unrelenting diarrhea. He steadily weakened until he died at seven in the morning of 20 February 1848. He was 29 years old. Two days later Alexander’s body was embalmed. At the same time an autopsy was conducted. The physicians, including Everard and Davies, discovered Alexander’s lungs were pretty much healthy, unlike his seriously affected stomach, intestines and liver. Pulmonary tuberculosis can therefore be ruled out as the cause of death. It is more likely Alexander succumbed to lymphoma or extrapulmonary tuberculosis.

Both Everard and Constant wrote letters to The Hague on 20 February. Due to headwinds, these took almost a month to reach The Hague. On 17 March the royal family finally received conclusive evidence of Alexander's death. The loss of their beloved son hit the King, who was in the middle of a political crisis, particularly hard. He lamented: "We walk as if on graves. The earth is nothing but a big grave, that devours all greatness, honour and glory". The Queen wrote to her brother Nicholas on 30 March: "Only today I feel strong enough to write some lines to tell you about the terrible disaster that has befallen us. Our Sasja is dead! and we have survived that blow.... He is at peace now, but we have to go on in this world, where he had no enemies, he who for me was the most loving of sons and the most loyal of companions." The Queen later had many of her son's possession brought to Soestdijk, including his two hunting dogs, Charon and Ditch, whom she visited on his birthday and the anniversary of his death. Almost two months passed before Alexander could be interred. On 6 March the steamship Phoenix had left for Madeira to collect him for his journey across the Mediterranean. Only when the ship arrived in the port of Funchal at the end of March did the captain learn that his passenger had already died. The Phoenix was prepared to take his body back to Holland. On 4 April, with much military display, the coffin (which, according to myth, had a peculiar turtle shape) was carried through Funchal to the beach. The next day, the Phoenix left the port of Funchal to anchor in Rotterdam on 17 April. The coffin containing Alexander's body was taken to the Rijkswerf, where the same mourning room had been set up as had been used for his grandfather William I five years earlier.

Prince Alexander was buried in the royal crypt at Nieuwe Kerk in Delft on Good Friday 21 April 1848. His brothers Henry and William, Prince of Orange were the only members of the royal family to attend the funeral. Both princes had had a close relationship with Alexander and they were much affected. After Alexander's death, his brother William refused to celebrate his birthday on the actual date of his birth, 19 February. Until 1859, the celebrations were moved to 17 June, the birthday of his wife Sophie.

== Honours ==
- Kingdom of the Netherlands: Grand Cross of the Netherlands Lion, 2 August 1828
- Kingdom of Prussia: Knight of the Order of the Black Eagle, 4 December 1834
- Kingdom of Hanover: Grand Cross of the Royal Guelphic Order, 1836
- Russian Empire: Grand Cross Order of St. Andrew, 10 September 1839

== Military ranks ==
Royal Netherlands Army

- Colonel (2 August 1828 until death)
- Commander, 1st regiment 2nd battalion Grenadier Guards (1831 - fall 1839)

Royal Netherlands Cavalry

- Major-General (2 August 1839 - 28 November 1840)
- Lieutenant-General (28 November 1840 - 21 February 1848)
- Commander of the heavy cavalry brigade (fall 1839 - 28 November 1840)
- Inspector-General (28 November 1840 - 21 February 1848)

Imperial Russian Cavalry

- Chief, Novorossiysk Dragoon Regiment (O.S. 26 August/ N.S. 7 September 1839 - O.S. 19 March/ N.S. 31 March 1848)

== Sources ==
- Bouman, J.J. (1967). Op en om Oranjes troon (in Dutch). Zaltbommel: Europese bibliotheek.
- Bouman, J.J. (1966). Oranje in beeld. Een familiealbum uit de 19de eeuw (in Dutch). Zaltbommel: Europese bibliotheek.
- Disbrowe, Charlotte Anne Albania (1903). Old Days in Diplomacy. Recollections of a closed century. London: Jarold & Sons.
- Jackman, S.W. (1987). De Romanov Relaties. Uit de privé-correspondentie van Anna Paulowna en haar familie (in Dutch). Baarn: Bosch en Keuning.
- Jackman, S.W. (1984). Een vreemdelinge in Den Haag. Uit de brieven van Koningin Sophie aan Lady Malet (in Dutch). Baarn: Bosch en Keuning.
- Matthes, Eliza Pieter (2010). Een jaar aan het hof. Het dagboek van Eliza Pieter Matthes 1842–1843. Een ooggetuige aan het hof van koning Willem II (in Dutch). Zwolle: Waanders.
- van Raak, Cees (2003). Vorstelijk begraven en gedenken. Funeraire geschiedenis van het huis Oranje-Nassau (in Dutch). Bussum: Thoth.
- Weintraub, Stanley (1997). Uncrowned King: The Life of Prince Albert. London: John Murray Inc. ISBN 0-7195-5756-9.
- In naam van Oranje, 30. Vijf eeuwen de Oranjes en hun sport en jacht (1994) Nationaal Museum Paleis Het Loo. Zwolle: Waanders (in Dutch)
- In naam van Oranje, 33. Vijf eeuwen de Oranjes en de onbekende oranjeprinsen (1995) Nationaal Museum Paleis Het Loo. Zwolle: Waanders (in Dutch)
- de Winter-Agterhuis, Tessa. "Onze Sasja is niet meer". Tijdschrift voor geschiedenis (in Dutch). 137 (1).
- Delprat, Pauline (1902). Souvenirs d'un chapelain de la cour recueillis de la correspondance de D. Delprat (in French).
- Stuart Wortley, Emmeline (1854). A visit to Portugal and Madeira.
- Hamer, Dianne (2010). Sophie, koningin der Nederlanden (in Dutch).
