= Princess Amalia of Saxe-Weimar-Eisenach =

Amalia of Saxe-Weimar-Eisenach
- Princess Henry of the Netherlands
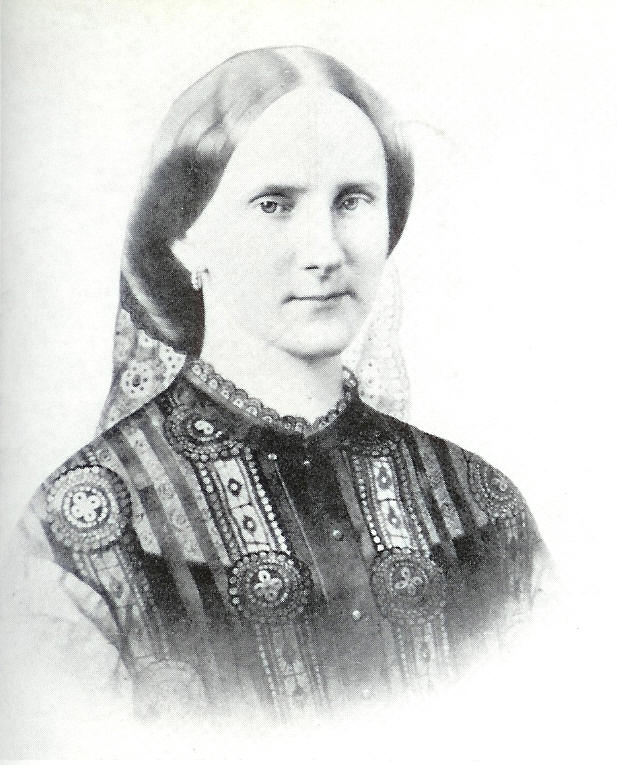
- Born: 20 March 1830; Ghent
- Died: 1 May 1872 (aged 42); Walferdange, Luxembourg
- Burial: Nieuwe Kerk, Delft
- Spouse: Prince Henry of the Netherlands (m. 1853)
Names
- Amalia Maria da Gloria Augusta
- House: Saxe-Weimar-Eisenach
- Father: Prince Bernhard of Saxe-Weimar-Eisenach
- Mother: Princess Ida of Saxe-Meiningen

Princess Amalia of Saxe-Weimar-Eisenach (Amalia Maria da Gloria Augusta; 20 March 1830 – 1 May 1872) was a Dutch princess as the first wife of Prince Henry of the Netherlands, son of king William II of the Netherlands.

== Life ==
=== Family ===
She was the daughter of Prince Bernhard of Saxe-Weimar-Eisenach and Princess Ida of Saxe-Meiningen.

=== Princess of the Netherlands ===
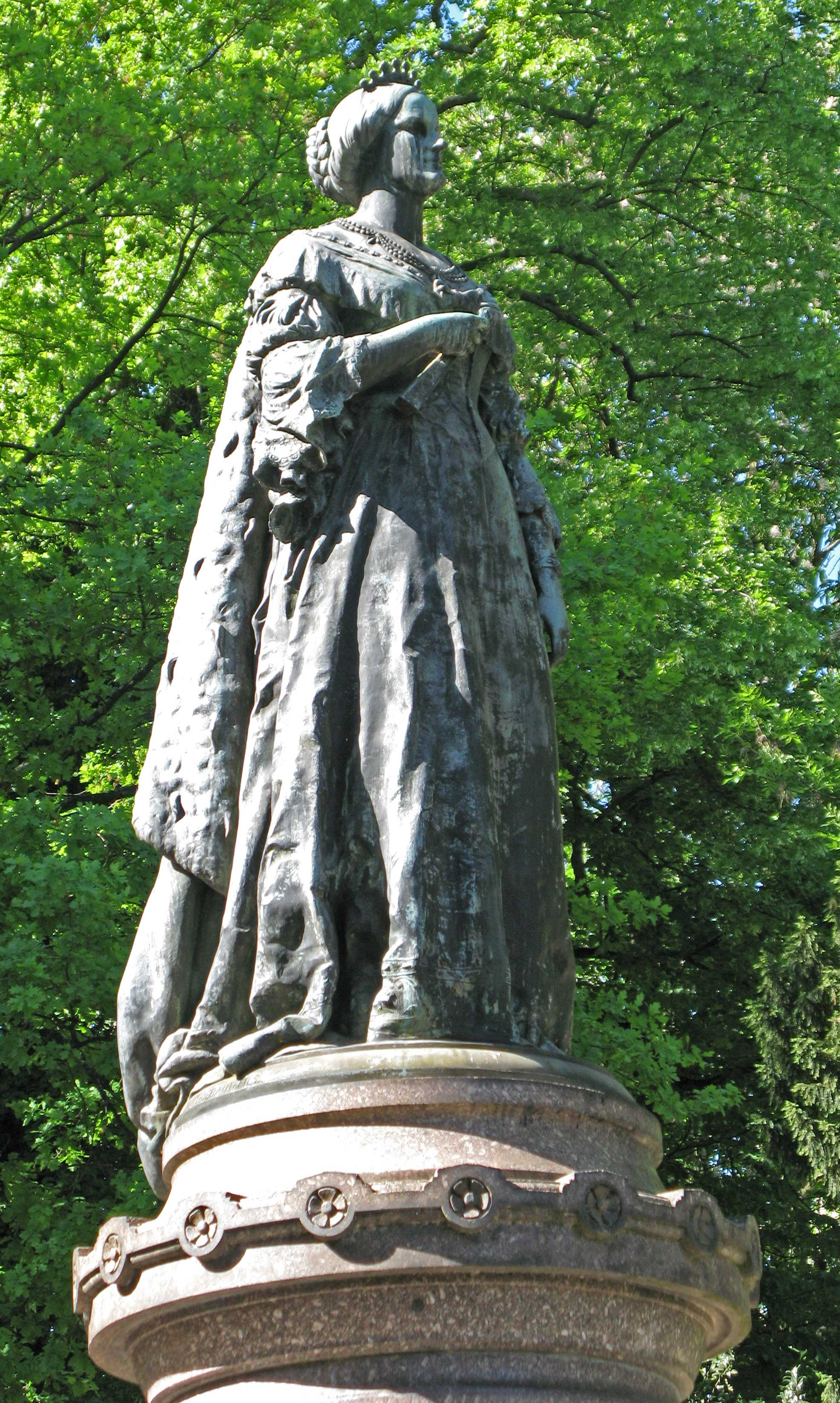
Statue of Amalia in Luxembourg City's Municipal Park

She first met Henry, alongside his brother Alexander on the island of Madeira in 1847. She married Henry in Weimar on 19 May 1853. They divided their time between Walferdange Castle in Luxembourg, where Henry served as regent in his brother William III's name, and the Soestdijk Palace during the summer.

The marriage remained childless but was described as a happy one, with Amalia acting as the confidante, support and adviser of Henry, and as an intermediary during family conflicts. She may have influenced Henry's defense of the independent position of Luxembourg during the conflict of 1866–1870.

As she had been before her marriage, she had a great interest in charity, which made her widely popular in Luxembourg. It was thanks to her that kindergartens (initiated by Friedrich Fröbel) were introduced into the area.

Amalia died of a pulmonary infection at Walferdange Castle in 1872, and was buried in the Nieuwe Kerk at Delft. Her death was met with an outpouring of grief in Luxembourg; a monument in her honour, consisting of a three-meter statue of her likeness on a granite base, was inaugurated in Henry's presence on 30 October 1876 on the edge of Luxembourg City's newly created Municipal Park.

== Ancestry ==
Ancestors of Princess Amalia of Saxe-Weimar-Eisenach

8. Ernest Augustus II, Duke of Saxe-Weimar-Eisenach
4. Charles Augustus, Grand Duke of Saxe-Weimar-Eisenach
9. Anna Amalia of Brunswick-Wolfenbüttel
2. Prince Bernhard of Saxe-Weimar-Eisenach
10. Louis IX, Landgrave of Hesse-Darmstadt
5. Louise of Hesse-Darmstadt
11. Caroline of Zweibrücken
1. Princess Amalia of Saxe-Weimar-Eisenach
12. Anton Ulrich, Duke of Saxe-Meiningen
6. George I, Duke of Saxe-Meiningen
13. Charlotte Amalie of Hesse-Philippsthal
3. Ida of Saxe-Meiningen
14. Prince Christian Albert of Hohenlohe-Langenburg
7. Luise Eleonore of Hohenlohe-Langenburg
15. Karoline of Stolberg-Gedern

Media related to Amalia of Saxe-Weimar-Eisenach at Wikimedia Commons
