= Walferdange Castle =

19th century castle in Luxembourg

Coordinates: 49°39′38″N 6°08′02″E

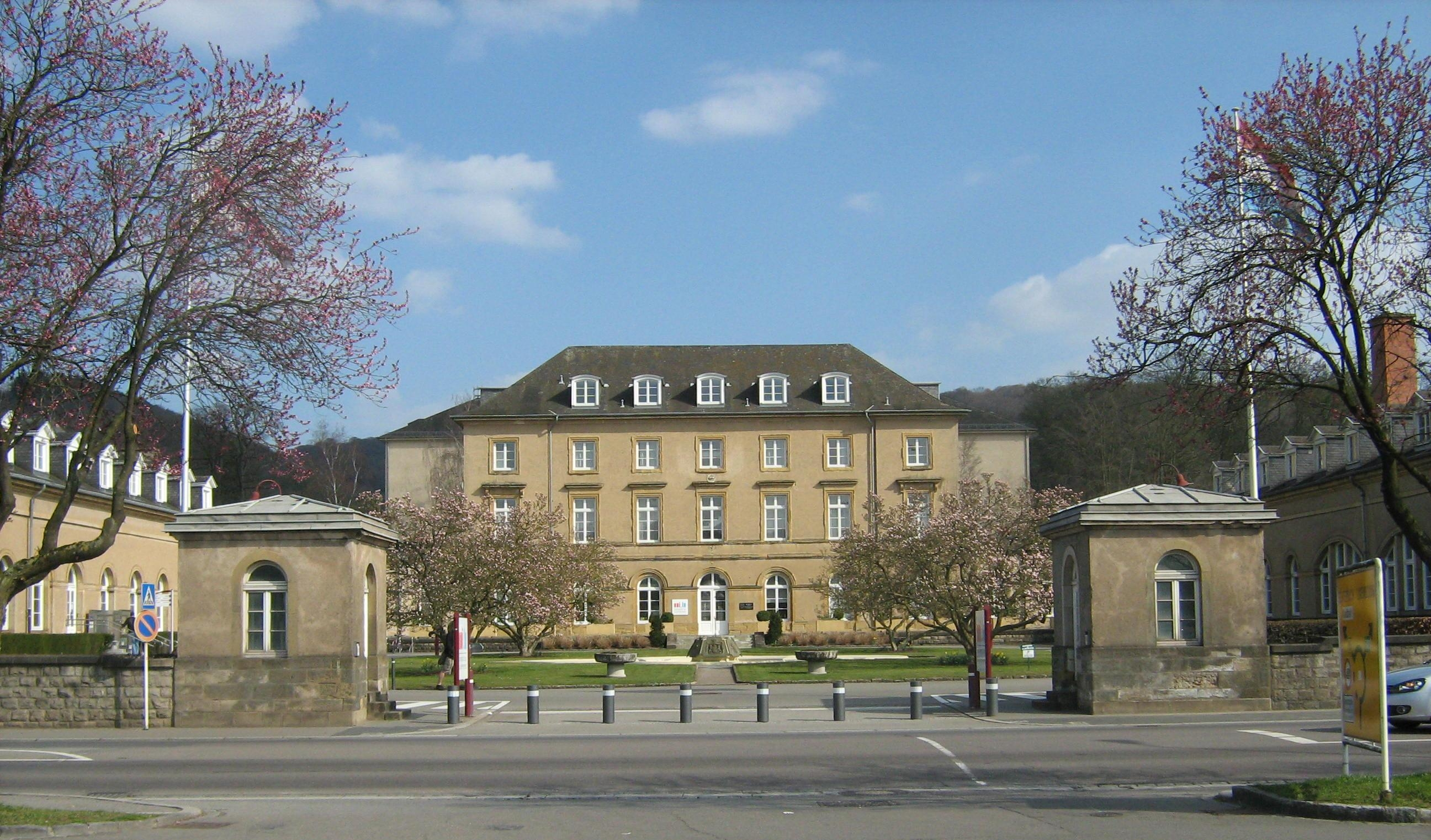
Walferdange Castle

Walferdange Castle (Luxembourgish: Walfer Schlass; French: Château de Walferdange), located in the small town of Walferdange in central Luxembourg, dates from 1824, when William I of the Netherlands, who was also Grand Duke of Luxembourg, built it as a stud farm. It was a part of the University of Luxembourg and since 2015 has been used by the Ministry of National Education, Childhood and Youth (Luxembourg).

== History ==
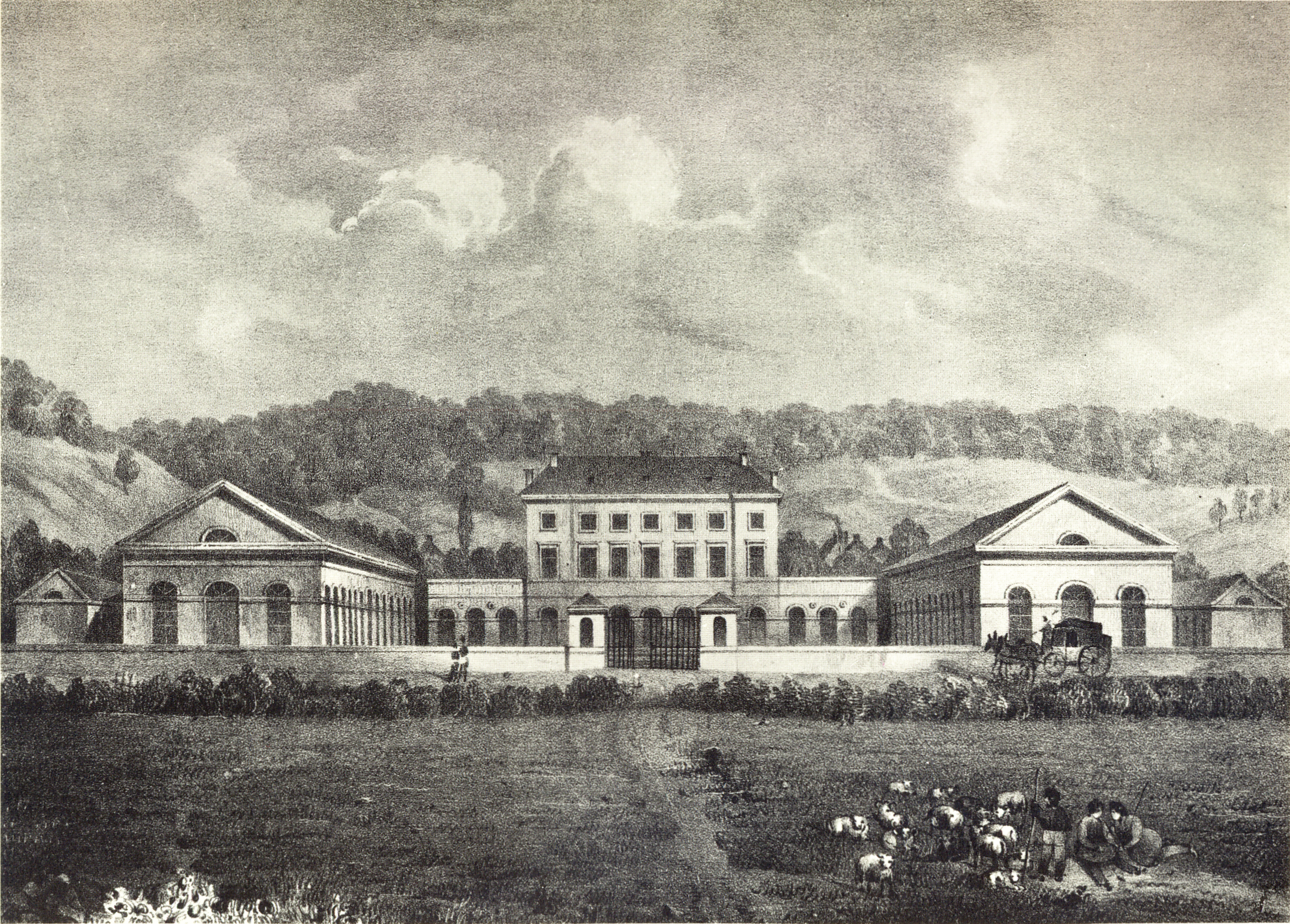
Historical drawing by Nicolas Liez (1834)

William I built the castle as a stud farm for breeding horses between 1824 and 1828. His son, William II, converted it into a royal residence where he stayed when visiting Luxembourg. It was, however, his son Prince Henry and his wife Amalia who extended the castle and its gardens while they lived there from 1853. Prince Henry, who was governor of Luxembourg, was well liked, especially in Walferdange, where he distributed gifts to the children each Christmas. After his death in 1879, the castle lay empty until Grand Duke Adolphe adopted it as his summer residence until his death in 1905, completely refurbishing the castle and its park. During the 20th century, the castle was used successively as a hospital, a teacher training college, an army barracks for the American and then the Luxembourg army and a pedagogical institute, before the University of Luxembourg opened its Faculty of Language and Literature, Humanities, Arts and Education there in 2003.

== University campus ==
In 2003, the castle was transformed to serve as one of the campuses of the University of Luxembourg that housed the Faculty of Language and Literature, Humanities, Arts and Education.

== Castle today ==
Since 2015, the castle has been used by the Ministry of National Education, Childhood and Youth to house some of its departments.

== See also ==
- University of Luxembourg
- List of castles in Luxembourg
