= Kneuterdijk Palace =

Seat of the Council of State of the Netherlands in The Hague

- Paleis Kneuterdijk (Dutch)
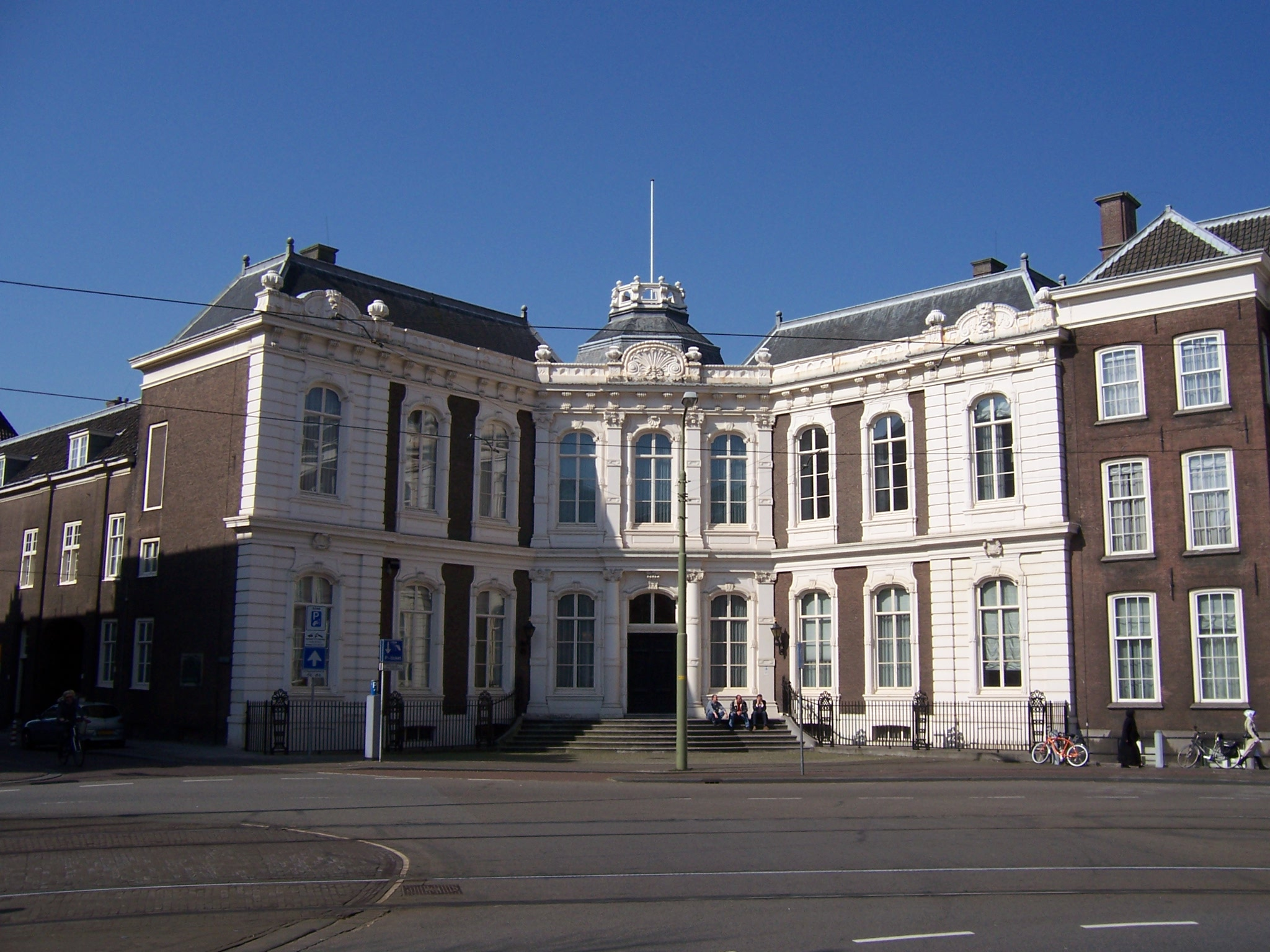
- Kneuterdijk Palace in 2007
- Interactive map of the Kneuterdijk Palace area

General information
- Location: The Hague, Netherlands, Kneuterdijk 20–22
- Coordinates: 52°4′52″N 4°18′31″E
- Current tenants: Dutch Council of State
- Construction started: 1717
- Completed: 1720
- Owner: The Netherlands

Design and construction
- Architect: Daniel Marot

Website
- https://denhaag.com/en/kneuterdijk-palace

Kneuterdijk Palace (Dutch: Paleis Kneuterdijk [paːˈlɛis knøːtərˈdɛik]) is a former royal palace of the Netherlands located in The Hague, nowadays the seat of the Council of State. Built in 1716 in the Louis XIV style by architect Daniel Marot, it was commissioned by Count Johan Hendrik of Wassenaer-Obdam, member of the House of Wassenaer. The palace served as a residence for King William II of the Netherlands and his wife Queen Anna Paulowna in the first half of the 19th century, when he was still the crown prince. William II added several buildings designed in the English Tudor style, of which only the so-called “Gothic Hall” has survived. The hall was designed after the great dining hall of Christ Church, Oxford, of which William II was an alumnus.

Their grandson Crown Prince William used the palace from 1858 till his death in 1879. In the 1930s the palace was occasionally used by Princess Juliana. After World War II Dutch war criminals were tried in the former ballroom, some of whom were sentenced to death. Then the Ministry of Finance used the building for many years. Since restoration work was completed in 2001 the palace has been in use by the Netherlands' Council of State (Raad van State).

The Palace has been a listed as a National Heritage Site of the Netherlands since 1967.

== Gallery ==
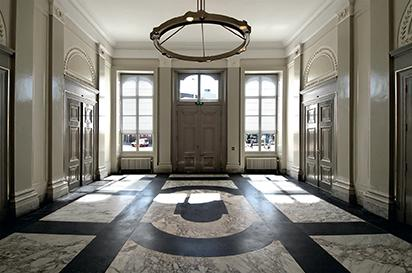
Entrance hall

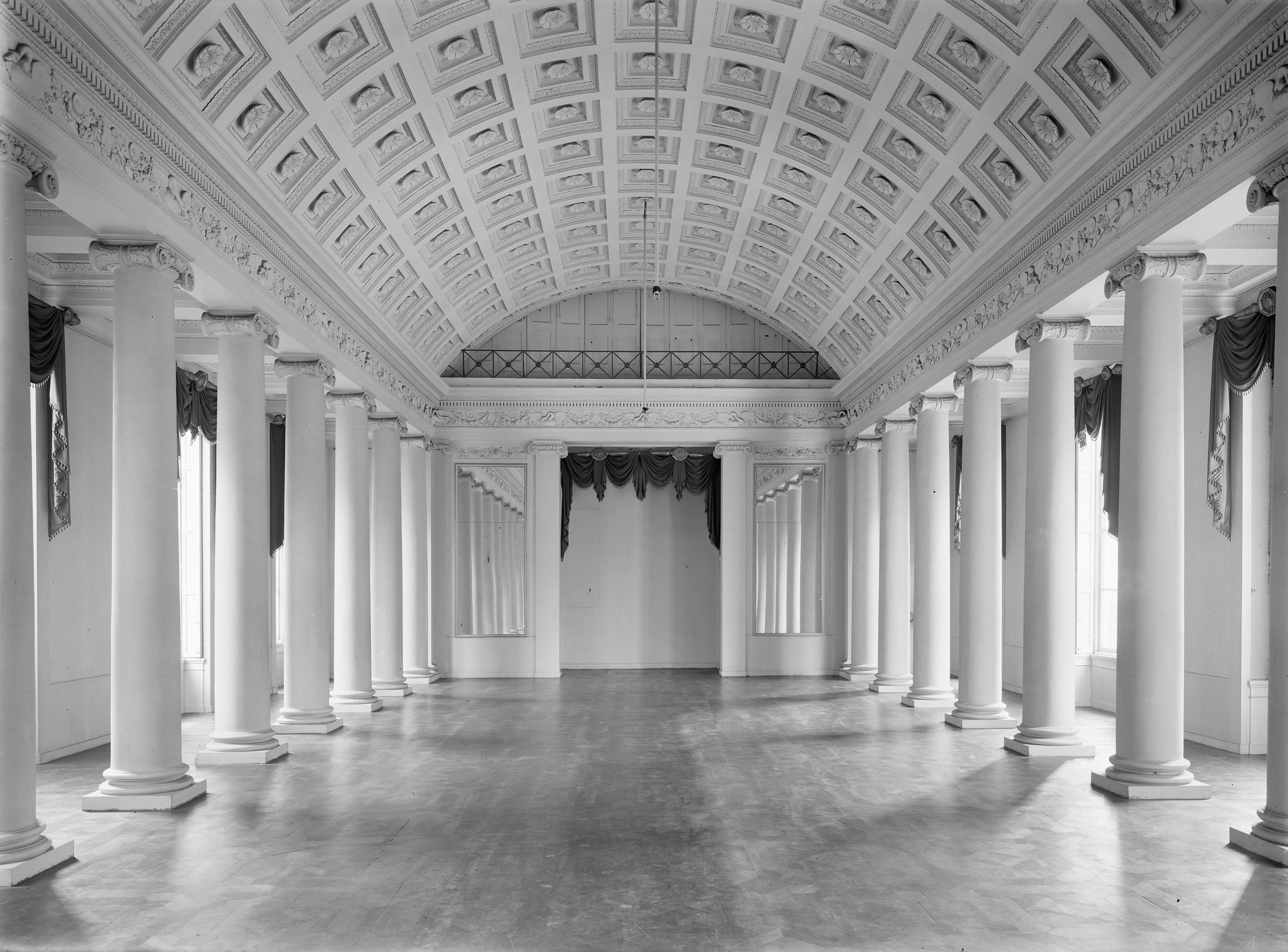
Neoclassicist ballroom, added between 1816 and 1820

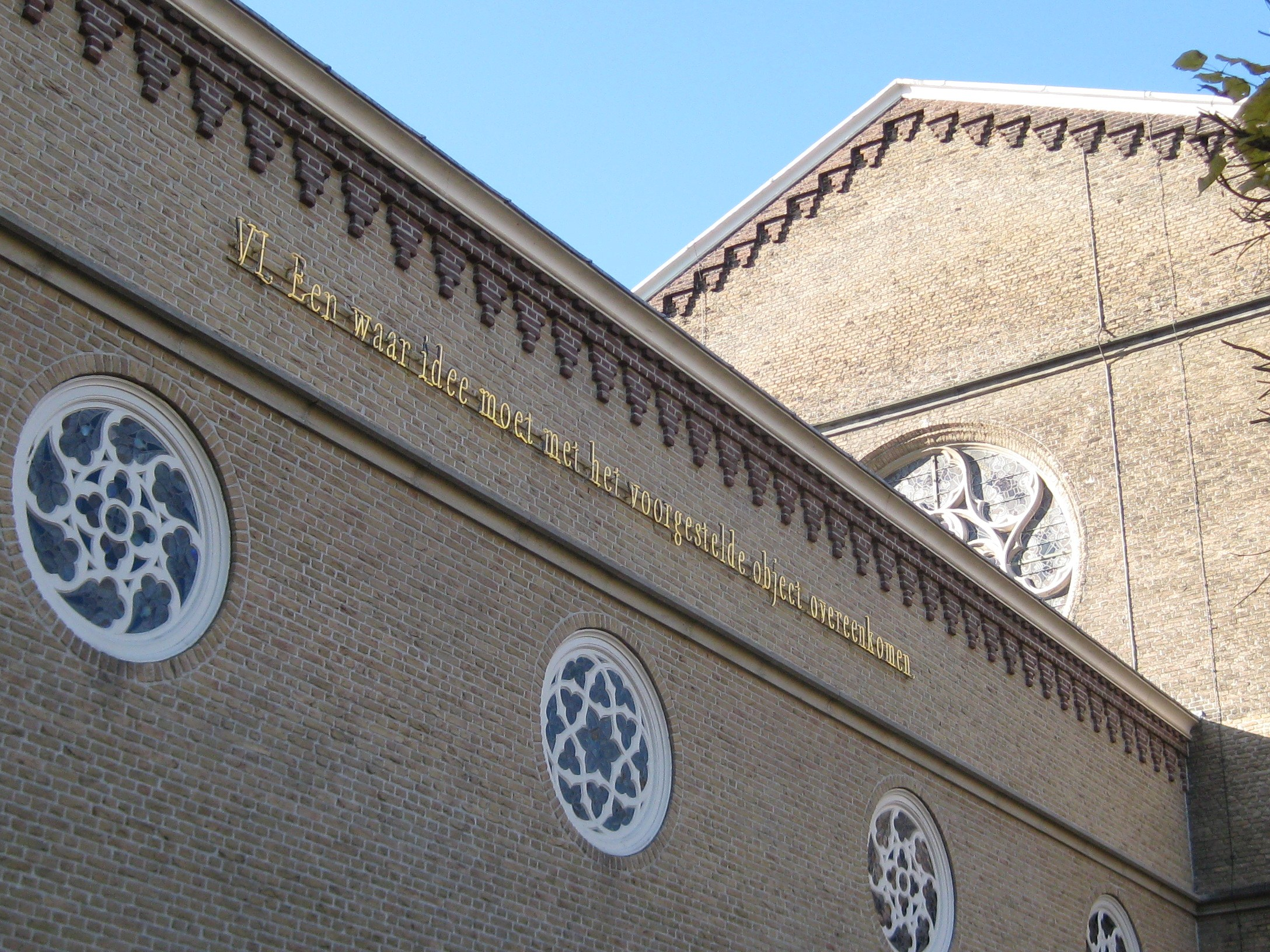
Neon art by Joseph Kosuth on the side of the gallery leading to the Gothic Hall

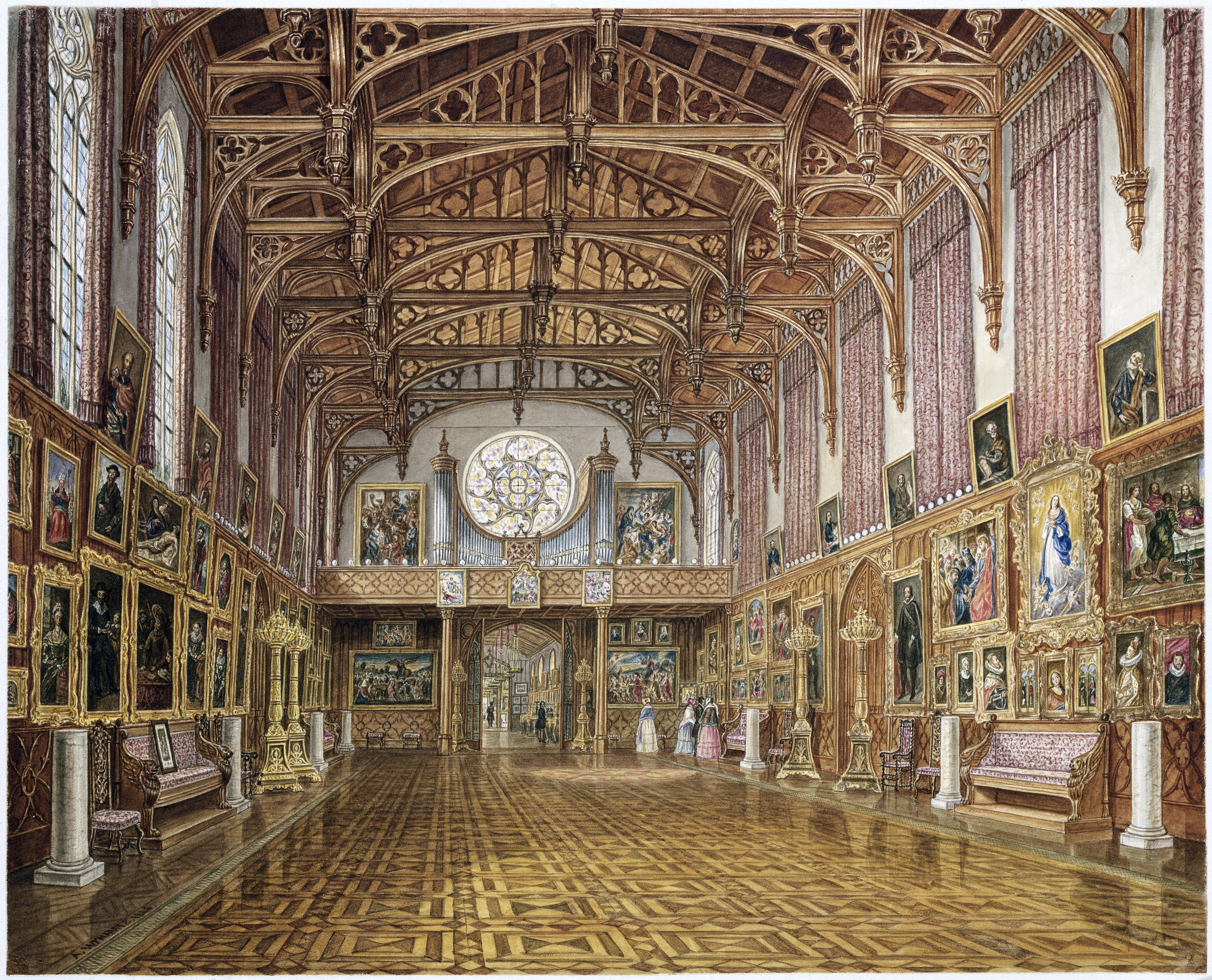
1846 painting of the interior of the Gothic Hall

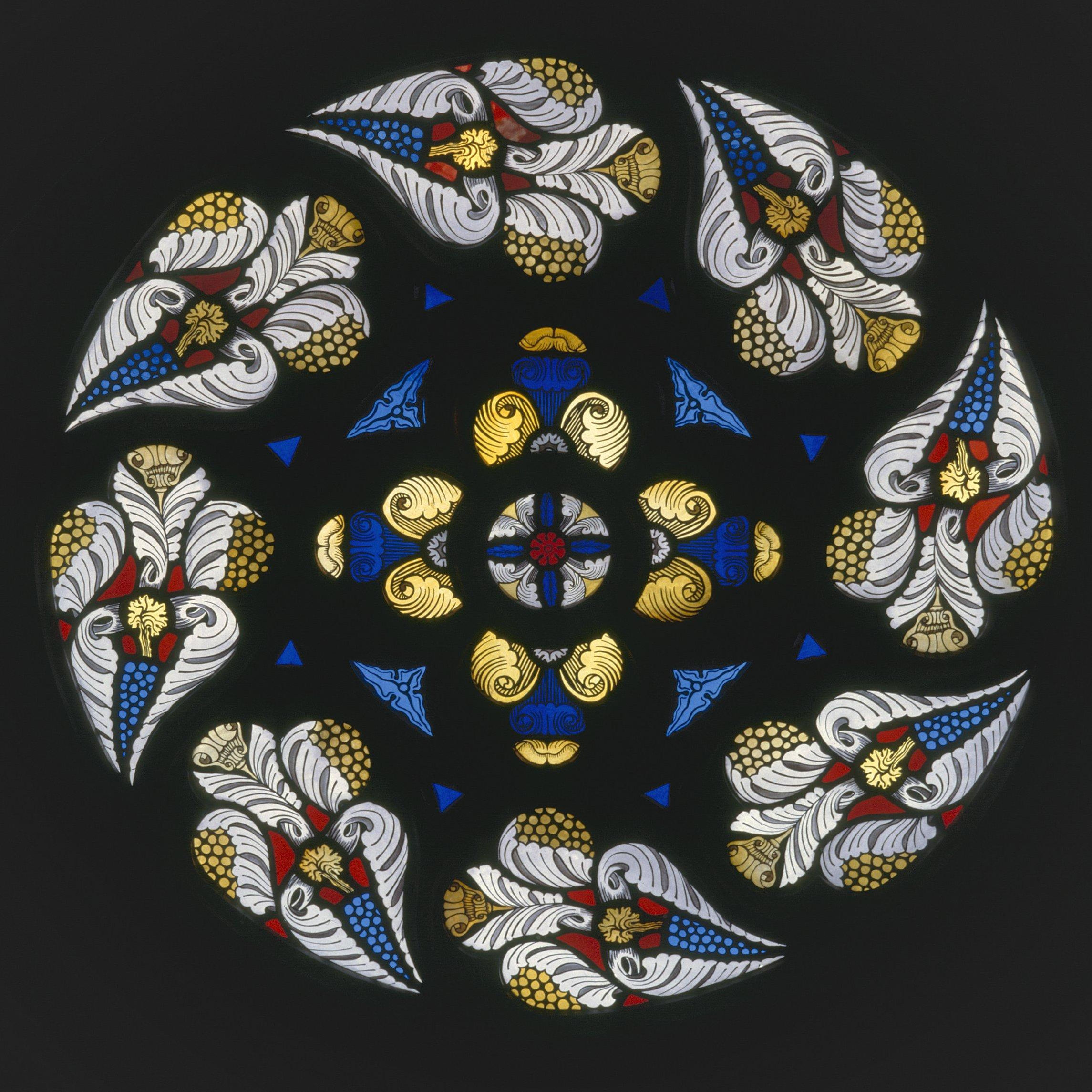
Stained glass in the Gothic Hall (1989)

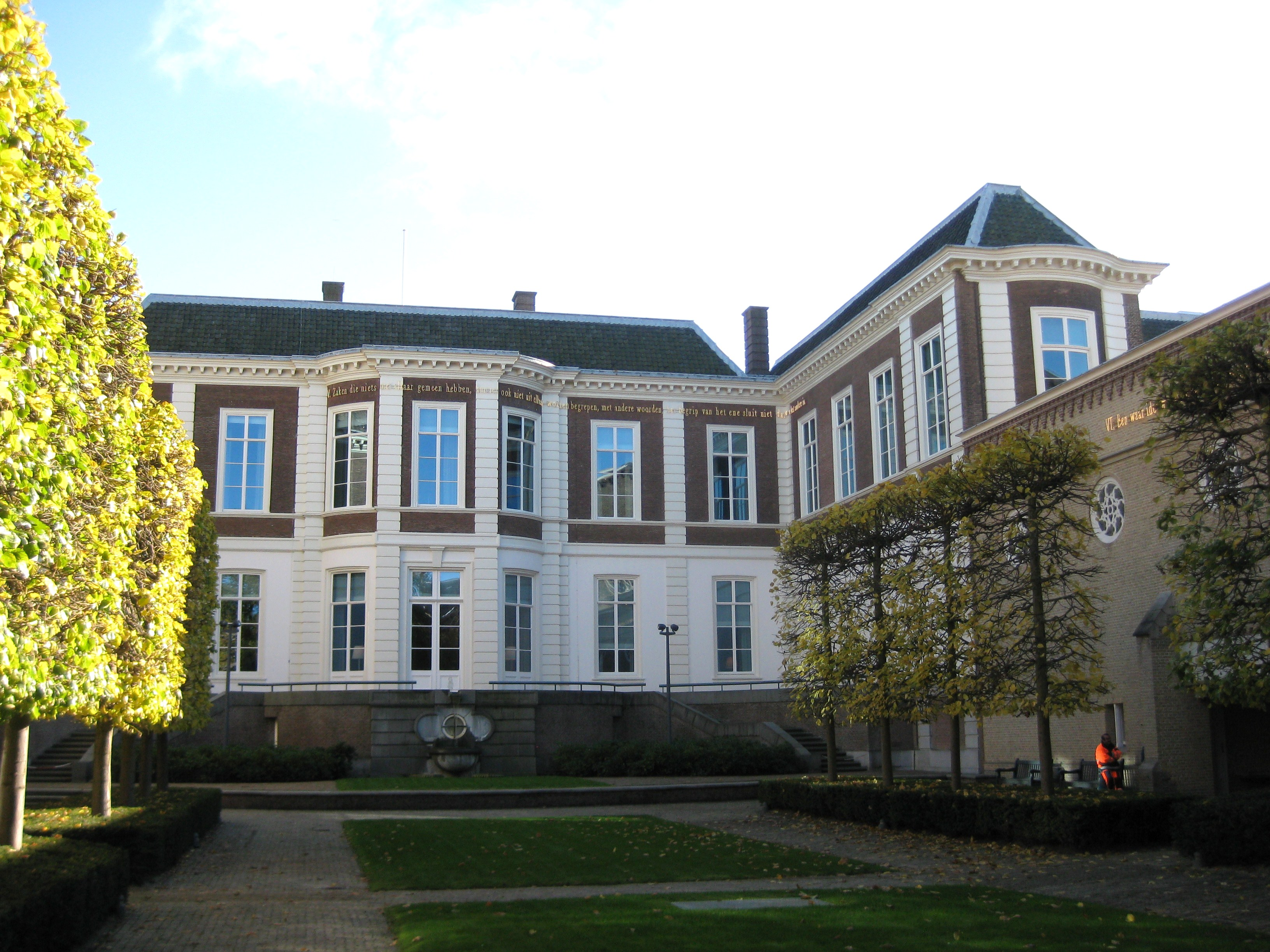
Back side of the former palace

== Sources ==
- Travel Guide to the Hague
