= President Garfield: From Radical to Unifier =

2023 biography of James A. Garfield

- Cover of the hardback first edition
- Author: C.W. Goodyear
- Language: English
- Subject: James A. Garfield
- Genre: Biography
- Publisher: Simon & Schuster
- Publication date: July 4, 2023
- Media type: Print (hardcover), e-book, audiobook
- Pages: 624 pp.
- ISBN: 978-1982146917

President Garfield: From Radical to Unifier is a 2023 biography of U.S. President James A. Garfield by C.W. Goodyear. It was described by presidential historian Richard Norton Smith as "the most comprehensive Garfield biography in almost 50 years, and the most readable ever."

== Background ==
President Garfield was Goodyear's first book. A ghostwriter in Washington, D.C., Goodyear started researching the book around 2018. He has said he was looking for historical periods that could provide insights into the contemporary United States and focused on Reconstruction and the Gilded Age. “The more I looked, the more deeper and more compelling I found the life [of Garfield]," Goodyear has said. "And he was not necessarily forgotten, but he was neglected." Goodyear's research, which included time in the Library of Congress, the Hiram College archives and other archives in Ohio, was disrupted by the COVID-19 lockdowns.

== Contents ==
President Garfield covers Garfield's in five sections. Part I covers Garfield's family of origin and their settlement in the Western Reserve, as well as his birth, upbringing, education, marriage, academic career and early political career. Part II covers Garfield's Civil War military service. Part III covers Garfield's election to the U.S. House of Representatives, culminating in his tenure as Minority Leader of the United States House of Representatives. The final and fourth part covers the election of 1880, Garfield's brief presidency, his assassination and his legacy.

Each chapter opens with a different quote from Shakespeare that Garfield had written in his diary.

== Reception ==
President Garfield was well-reviewed upon publication. Publishers Weekly called the book "a thorough complement to previous biographies, which tended to focus more on the legacy of Garfield’s murder than on his life, An Associated Press review said that "[w]ith his engaging writing and comprehensive research, Goodyear's biography offers a reassessment of Garfield that's a welcome introduction to the statesman." Kirkus Reviews called it "a masterful portrait of a man of great intellect, patience, and ability who should not be overlooked by history."

Writing in the Wall Street Journal, Smith described the book as "the most readable [Garfield biography] ever" and Goodyear as "a stylish and energetic writer, whose passion for his subject is reminiscent of a youthful Edmund Morris in The Rise of Theodore Roosevelt." Smith also praised Goodyear's description of "the drama of a runaway convention, culminating in Garfield’s nomination on the 36th ballot."

In the Washington Examiner, Carl Paulus critiqued the book for not delivering on its subtitle "From Radical to Unifier." "Goodyear offers instance after instance of the 20th president being a radical and a unifier simultaneously," Paulus writes, "dealing in negotiations while also being willing to walk away. For example, when he walks out of the infamous meeting at Wormley's Hotel when the Compromise of 1877 was hammered out by Republicans and Southern Democrats to make Rutherford B. Hayes president. Garfield walked the tightrope of idealism and reality well." However, noting the short duration of Garfield's presidency, Paulus praised the book as "more valuable as a history of Congress during the period than a presidential biography. Throughout his time in the House, we see the importance of Garfield’s intellectual and ideological consistency."

Likewise, writing in the Washington Post, Garrett Graff called the book "ultimately not just a careful study of Garfield but a portrait of a nation in transition — from its wild youth, where Garfield emerges, the last president born in a literal log cabin, through its awkward, violent adolescence with the Civil War, where Garfield becomes the Union’s youngest general, and onward as it heaves through Reconstruction and the Gilded Age toward adulthood as an industrialized economic empire." While calling President Garfield "delightfully and energetically written," Graff questioned the "seemingly short shrift Goodyear gives [Ulysses] Grant: Though the Union-preserving general’s reputation — long savaged by Lost Cause-friendly historians — has been restored by writers like Joan Waugh and Ron Chernow, Grant as general, president and ex-president here appears as a somewhat one-dimensional bumbler."
