= Mike Henry (businessman) =

Canadian-born businessman

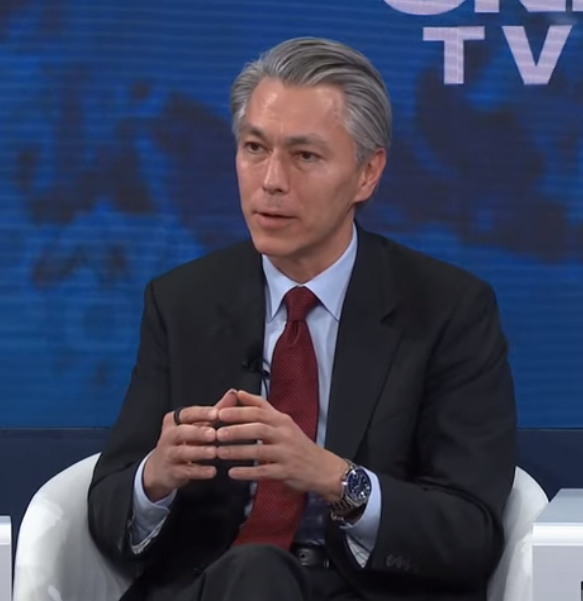
- At the 2024 World Economic Forum
- Born: 1966 (age 59–60)
- Education: University of British Columbia
- Occupation: Businessman
- Title: CEO, BHP

Mike Henry (born 1966) is a Canadian-born businessman who was the CEO of BHP from 1 January 2020 to 30 June 2026.

== Career ==
Henry graduated with a Bachelor of Science degree in chemistry from the University of British Columbia. In 1999, Henry came to Australia as an employee of Mitsubishi to help with the joint venture, the BHP Mitsubishi Alliance (BMA), formed by the Japanese company and BHP. In 2001, Henry was seconded to BMA. By 2003, Henry had permanently joined BHP. In 2016, Henry took responsibility for BHP's Minerals Australia operation, the core of which revolves around its Iron Ore assets.

On 1 January 2020, Henry took over as CEO of BHP from Andrew Mackenzie.. He stepped down as CEO to allow the President of BHP Americas, Brandon Craig, to take over for the beginning of the 2026-27 Australian financial year.

== Personal life ==
Henry has Japanese heritage from his mother. Henry has two adult daughters.

Business positions
Preceded by Andrew Mackenzie	CEO of BHP; 2020–	Incumbent
