= Prince Henry of the Netherlands (1820–1879) =

Dutch prince (1820–1879)

Prince Henry
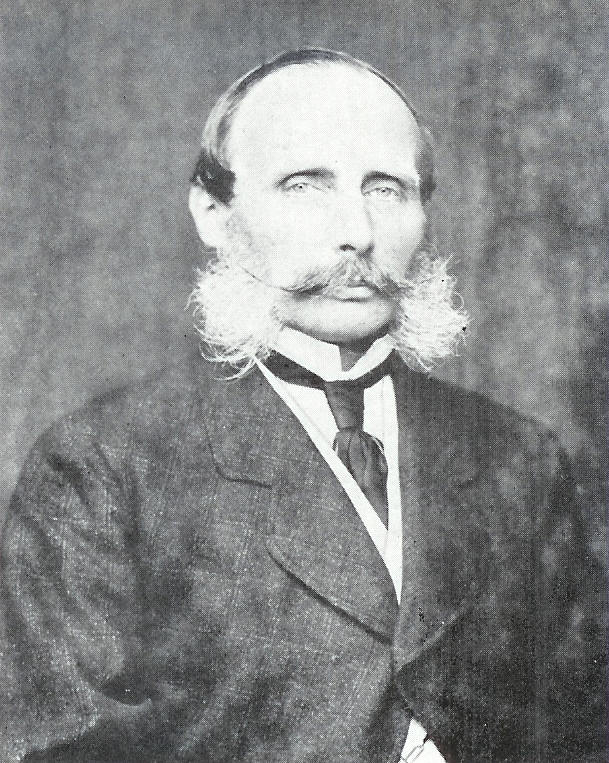
- Prince Henry c. 1870
- Born: 13 June 1820; Soestdijk Palace, Baarn, Kingdom of the Netherlands
- Died: 13 January 1879 (aged 58); Walferdange Castle, Walferdange, Grand Duchy of Luxembourg
- Spouse: Princess Amalia of Saxe-Weimar-Eisenach (m. 1853; died 1872) Princess Marie of Prussia (m. 1878)
- House: Orange-Nassau
- Father: William II of the Netherlands
- Mother: Anna Pavlovna of Russia
- Military career
- Allegiance: The Netherlands
- Branch: Royal Netherlands Navy

Prince William Frederick Henry of the Netherlands (Dutch: Willem Frederik Hendrik; 13 June 1820 – 13 January 1879) was the third son of King William II of the Netherlands and his wife, Grand Duchess Anna Pavlovna of Russia. He was born at Soestdijk Palace.

Prince Henry became Governor of Luxembourg in 1850, in which capacity he served until his death in 1879. During his tenure, he worked with the government to launch the reactionary Coup of 1856, which consolidated power in the monarchy and the executive. However, most of the changes were reversed by the new constitution issued in 1868 after the 1867 Luxembourg Crisis, during which the crown tried to sell the grand duchy to France.

== Career ==
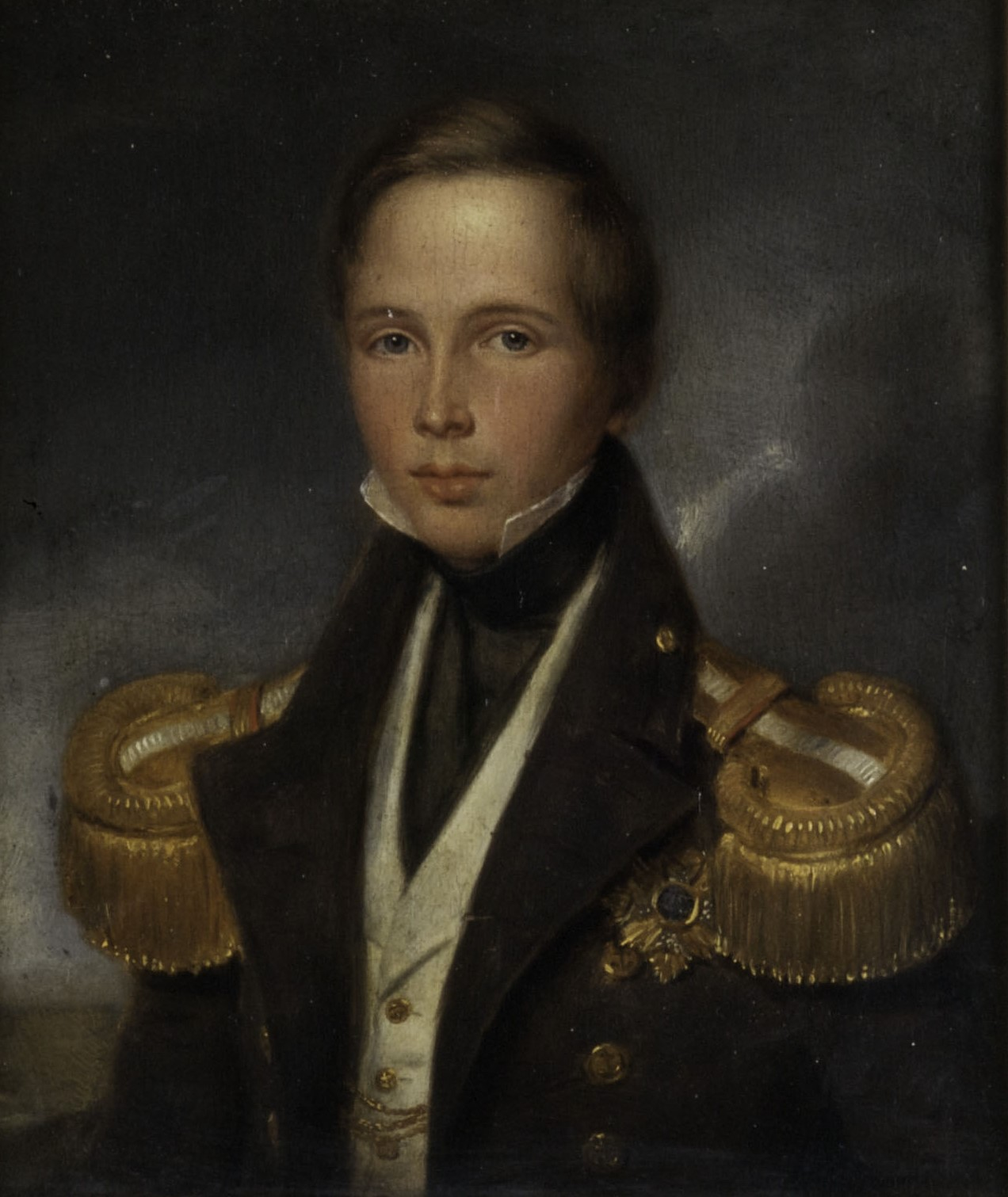
Henry as a 16-year-old lieutenant

Prince Henry was appointed an officer in the navy in his teens, and served many years, whence the sobriquet de Zeevaarder ("the Navigator"), after the Portuguese Prince Henry the Navigator. He visited the Dutch East Indies in 1837, remaining there for seven months.

== Personal life ==
Prince Henry married twice. On 9 May 1853, in Weimar, he married Amalia Maria da Gloria Augusta of Saxe-Weimar-Eisenach (Ghent, 20 May 1830 - Walferdange Castle, 1 May 1872). It is unlikely Henry had any intention to remarry after what by all accounts had been a harmonious marriage. By the second half of the 1870s, however. the continuation of the family line had become seriously threatened. No children had been born into the House of Orange-Nassau since 1851. King William III's eldest son, a bachelor in his late thirties, lived in voluntary exile in Paris because his father refused him permission to marry a Dutch countess. The Kings's second son had died in 1850, and his third son, who suffered from various health problems and seems to have had no romantic interest in women, was considered unlikely ever to marry. Fifty-eight-year-old Prince Henry therefore went searching for a second wife considerably younger than himself in a bid to save the family from extinction.

On 24 August 1878, in Potsdam, he married Marie Elisabeth Louise Frederica of Prussia (Marmorpalais, 14 September 1855 – Schloss Albrechtsberg, 20 June 1888). Within six months Henry had contracted measles and died. Like the first, his second marriage remained childless. At the time of his death at Walferdange Castle, Prince Henry was third in line of succession to the Dutch throne and one of five male family members. Five years later, only ageing King William III remained.

Prince Henry was a shy, pious and homely man, who had trouble speaking in public and (especially when he was young) was easily embarrassed. He got on very well with his brother Alexander and sister Sophie, but had a troubled relationship with his eldest brother William, especially after the latter had ascended the throne in 1849. According to Dutch Minister for War A.W.P. Weitzel, Prince Henry lived in salutary fear of his brother and did not interfere with anything lest it should offend the king.

Throughout his life, his title was His Royal Highness Prince Henry of the Netherlands, Prince of Orange-Nassau.

== Legacy ==
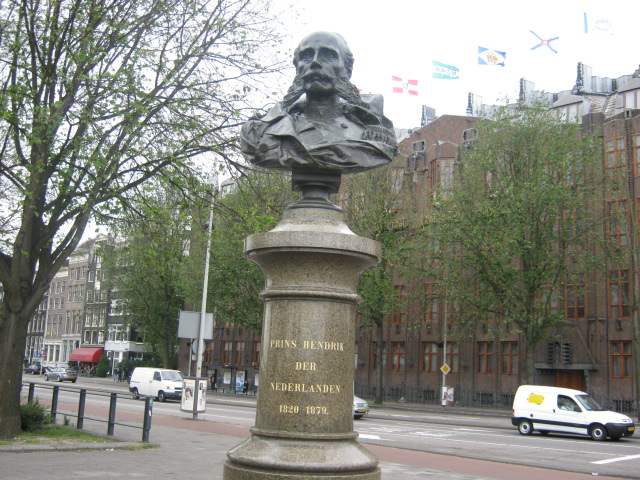
A bust of Prince Henry on Prins Hendrikkade in Amsterdam

The Prins Hendrikkade, a major street in Amsterdam, was named after Prince Henry following his death in 1879. A bust of Henry stands on the street.

The Prins Hendrik Stichting, a charity founded by Prince Henry in 1871 and named after him, provides care to sailors and their widows.

In Luxembourg, an oak tree in Grünewald forest was planted and named after him following his death in 1879. The city of Luxembourg also has a street named after Henry, the Boulevard Prince-Henri.

On the Caribbean island of St. Maarten, the eastern section of the Dutch side is officially called "Lower Prince's Quarter" and "Upper Prince's Quarter". The prince referred to is Henry, who was the first member of the house of Orange to visit the island in 1835.

== Honours ==
He received the following orders and decorations:

- Netherlands: Grand Cross of the Order of the Netherlands Lion
- Luxembourg: Grand Cross of the Order of the Oak Crown
- Russian Empire: Knight of the Order of St. Andrew the First-called, 10 June 1834
- Kingdom of Prussia: Knight of the Order of the Black Eagle, 8 February 1842
- Saxe-Weimar-Eisenach: Grand Cross of the Order of the White Falcon, 4 February 1845
- Württemberg: Grand Cross of the Order of the Württemberg Crown, 1849
- Sweden-Norway: Knight of the Order of the Seraphim, 23 February 1850
- (Saxe-Coburg and Gotha) (Duchy of Saxe-Altenburg) (Saxe-Meiningen) Ernestine duchies: Grand Cross of the Saxe-Ernestine House Order, June 1853
- Nassau: Grand Cross of the Order of Adolphe of Nassau, with Swords, June 1858
- Electorate of Hesse: Knight of the House Order of the Golden Lion, 12 September 1859
- Oldenburg: Grand Cross of the House and Merit Order of Duke Peter Friedrich Ludwig, with Golden Crown, 24 February 1878
- Belgium: Grand Cordon of the Order of Leopold (military), 25 March 1878
