= Society of Friends of Foreigners In Distress =

Society of Friends of Foreigners in Distress
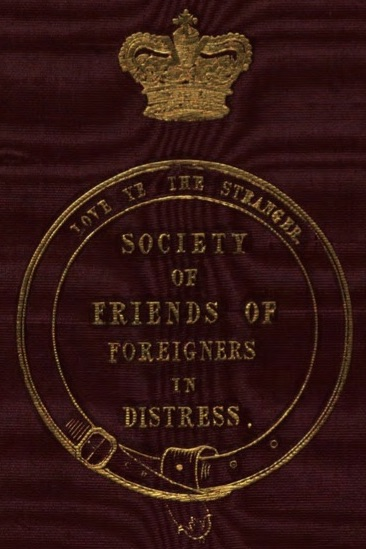
- Founded: 1806
- Type: Charity
- Registration no.: 212593 (England and Wales)
- Purpose: Foreign people with London
- Location: London, England, UK
- Region served: London, England

The Society of Friends of Foreigners In Distress is a charitable organization in London England whose aim is to "... grant relief to indigent foreigners here, without distinction of country or religion; especially to those who are not entitled to parochial aid: and to furnish the means to such as are desirous to return to their own countries."

Established in 1806, this is one of London's oldest charities that still operates. The impulse behind the charity was based on Dr. John Murray's Society of Universal Good Will, which had been stablished 40 years prior and was based out of Norwich.

The charity was so well funded, that by 1824 it had already supported several thousand foreigners and was supplying annual pensions for 50 individuals within London. Just a few of the many patrons of the society included: Maximilian I of Mexico, William Ernest, Grand Duke of Saxe-Weimar-Eisenach, Peter II, Grand Duke of Oldenburg, Frederick William, Grand Duke of Mecklenburg-Strelitz, Alfred, Duke of Saxe-Coburg and Gotha, Archduke Louis of Austria, Frederick III, German Emperor, Prince Henry of the Netherlands (governor), Prince Paul of Württemberg., to name a few.

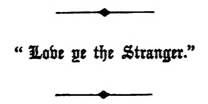
Slogan of the Society of Friends of Foreigners in Distress

== Societies of Friends of Foreigners in Distress ==
The Annual Report of the Liverpool Society of Friends of Foreigners in Distress 1865 mentioned similar societies in Manchester, Bradford, Hull, Glasgow and Edinburgh. The Newcastle Society of Friends of Foreigners in Distress published the first annual report in 1883.

Panikos Panayi cites the Account of 1828 of the Society of Friends of Foreigners in Distress in London mentioning branches in Hull, Leeds, Bradford, Huddersfield, Manchester and Liverpool.
