= Michael Henry (journalist) =

Michael Henry (February 19, 1830 – June 15, 1875) was a British journalist and mechanician who served as editor-in-chief of The Jewish Chronicle from 1869 until his death.

== Life ==
Henry was born on February 19, 1830, in Eltham House, Kennington, South London, the youngest son of Abraham Henry and Emma Lyon. His father was a merchant, and his mother was one of the first Anglo-Jewish woman to publish a literary work. His maternal grandfather Solomon Lyon was a Cambridge scholar and the Hebrew tutor of the Duke of Sussex.

Henry moved to Ramsgate with his family when he was three due to his father's declining health. By the time he was six, he was astonishing visitors with an intelligence beyond his years and writing scraps of poetry. He went to a Ramsage school when he was eight and spent two years there. When his father died in April 1840, he and his family moved back to London, where he began attending the City of London School. He left the School in June 1844 and was sent to his sister in Paris, where he briefly worked at a counting house.

Henry then returned to London and began working in the office of Mechanics' Magazine. When the magazine's editor James Robertson died in 1857, he began working as a patent agent. He worked in that business for the rest of his life. In 1847, he founded the General Benevolent Association. While working as a patent agent, he started assisting Abraham Benisch at The Jewish Chronicle. When Benisch retired in 1868, he became the paper's editor. He served as editor until his death. Interested in Jewish education, he was secretary and personal supervisor of the Stepney Jewish Schools. He was also connected with the Jewish College Council and a member of various Jewish educational organizations. He also wrote a pamphlet called "Patent Law," and in 1875 some of his essays were published as Life Thoughts.

Henry died on June 15, 1875, within 24 hours of his clothes accidentally being caught on fire. The funeral procession was followed by, among other people, both Chief Rabbis, nearly all of the local rabbis, and representatives from several public Jewish institutions. Boys from the Jews' Hospital, the Deaf and Dumb Home, the Gates of Hope School, and the Stepney Jewish Schools attended his burial in Willesden Jewish Cemetery, where twelve of the boys carried the bier to the grave and a deaf-mute said the Mourner's Kaddish.
