= Battle of Houthalen =

1831 battle of the Belgian Revolution

- Part of the Ten Days' Campaign
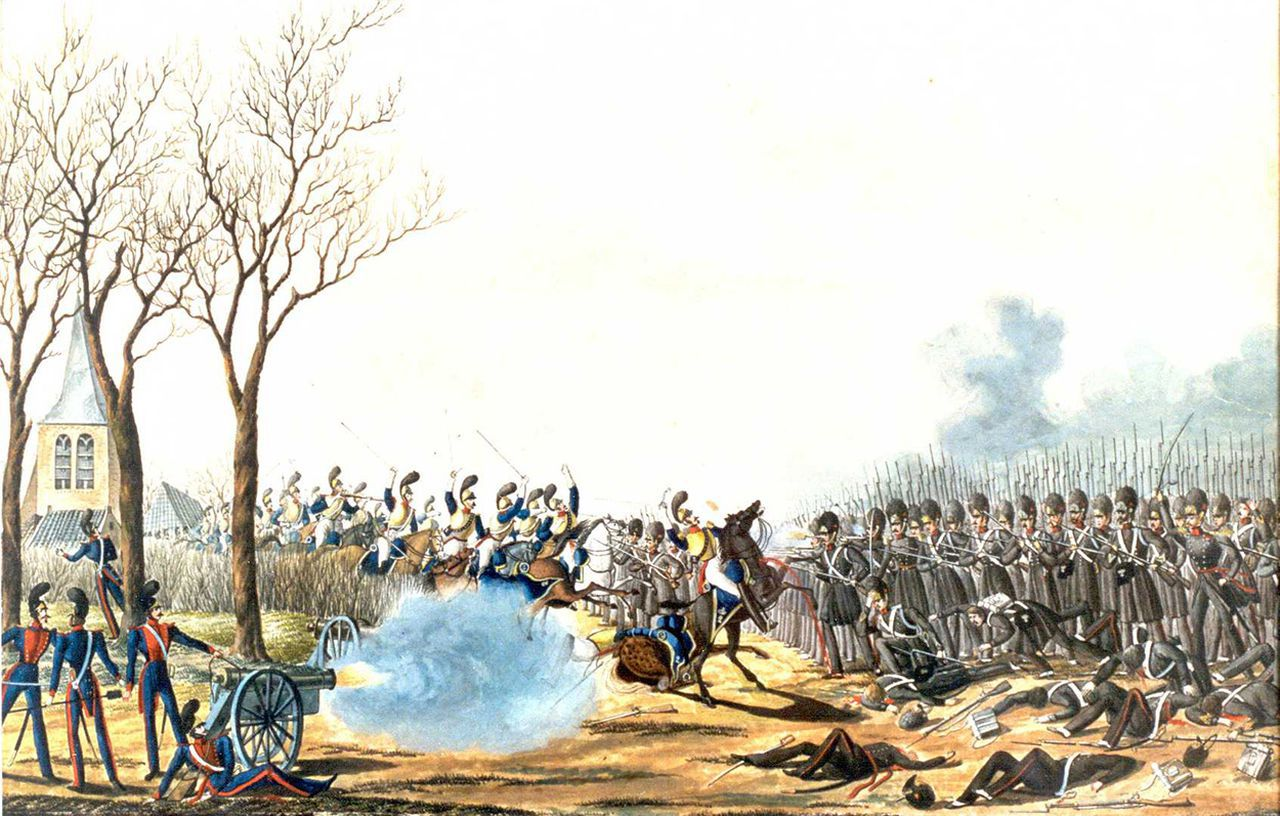
- Battle of Houthalen; 6 August 1831 (painting by A. von Geusau)
Date	6 August 1831
Location	Houthalen-Helchteren area, Belgium
Result	Dutch victory

Belligerents
Netherlands	Belgian rebels

Commanders and leaders
(Netherlands) Prince William (Netherlands) Frederik Knotzer	(Belgium) Leopold I

The Battle of Houthalen was a battle of the Ten Days' Campaign during the Belgian Revolution that took place on 6 August 1831. The Dutch army defeated the Belgian rebels and continued further to the Belgian inlands.

== The Battle ==
After the victorious battles of Ravels and Turnhout, Prince William II, the head of the Dutch army, continued with a military intervention against the Belgian Revolution as the part of the Ten Days' Campaign. On 6 August Dutch forces clashed with a Belgian rebel forces near Houthalen-Helchteren in a border Limburg province. The Dutch took a decisive victory, mainly thanks to a seize action of the 2nd Division of Frisian Archery.

Conflict lasted for six another days and included several another clashes such as Battle of Hasselt and the Battle of Leuven. Finally on 13 August 1831 the truce was arranged the Dutch pulled back. The last Dutch troops withdrew on 20 August.

At the cemetery of Houthalen, a commemorative cross was erected after the battle. Dutch painter Nicolaas Pieneman portrayed Lieutenant-General Frederik Knotzer in the battle on his painting from 1834.
