= Battle of Turnhout (1831) =

- Part of the Ten Days' Campaign, and Belgian Revolution
Date	3 August 1831
Location	Turnhout, Belgium
Result	Dutch victory

Belligerents
Netherlands	Belgian rebels

Commanders and leaders
(Netherlands) Prince William (Netherlands) Saxe-Weimar	(Belgium) Lieutenant Balfour (Belgium) Van Lieshout (Note: Mayor of the city of Turnhout) (surrendered)

Strength
11,000	1,300 soldiers, number of voluntaires.

Casualties and losses
Unknown but less than the Belgians	Unknown but more than the Dutch.

The Battle of Turnhout took place in 1831, during the Belgian Revolution, a force of 11,000 men attacked Turnhout under General Saksen-Weimar's leadership. The Belgian forces were defeated, and Turnhout surrendered to the Dutch.

== Battle ==
Before the battle there where around 1,300 soldiers stationed in Turnhout. On August 3, 11,000 men gathered on the Ravels hill to prepare for an attack on Turnhout, led by General Saksen-Weimar. Van Geen's division pretended to advance towards Antwerp but planned to attack the city from the west. Two pieces of Belgian artillery were quickly silenced by the Dutch artillery. After a battle, the Belgian forces hastily fled Turnhout, leaving many weapons of the citizen guard behind due to transportation issues. Only a few soldiers, commanded by Lieutenant Balfour, remained and fired a few shots. Soon after, Mayor Van Lieshout initiated negotiations for surrender, having already informed Niellon that he lacked sufficient manpower to defend the city. The first division went on the Turnhout/Antwerp road and stationed themselves in Vosselaar, while the second division occupied Turnhout. The third division, under General Meyer, established their camp in the villages of Arendonk and Retie. Although it is unknown how many people died in Turnhout, it is said that more Belgians died than the Dutch.
