= Onzelievehereboom =

1200-year-old oak tree in Belgium

Coordinates: 50°51′9.72″N 5°22′2.29″E

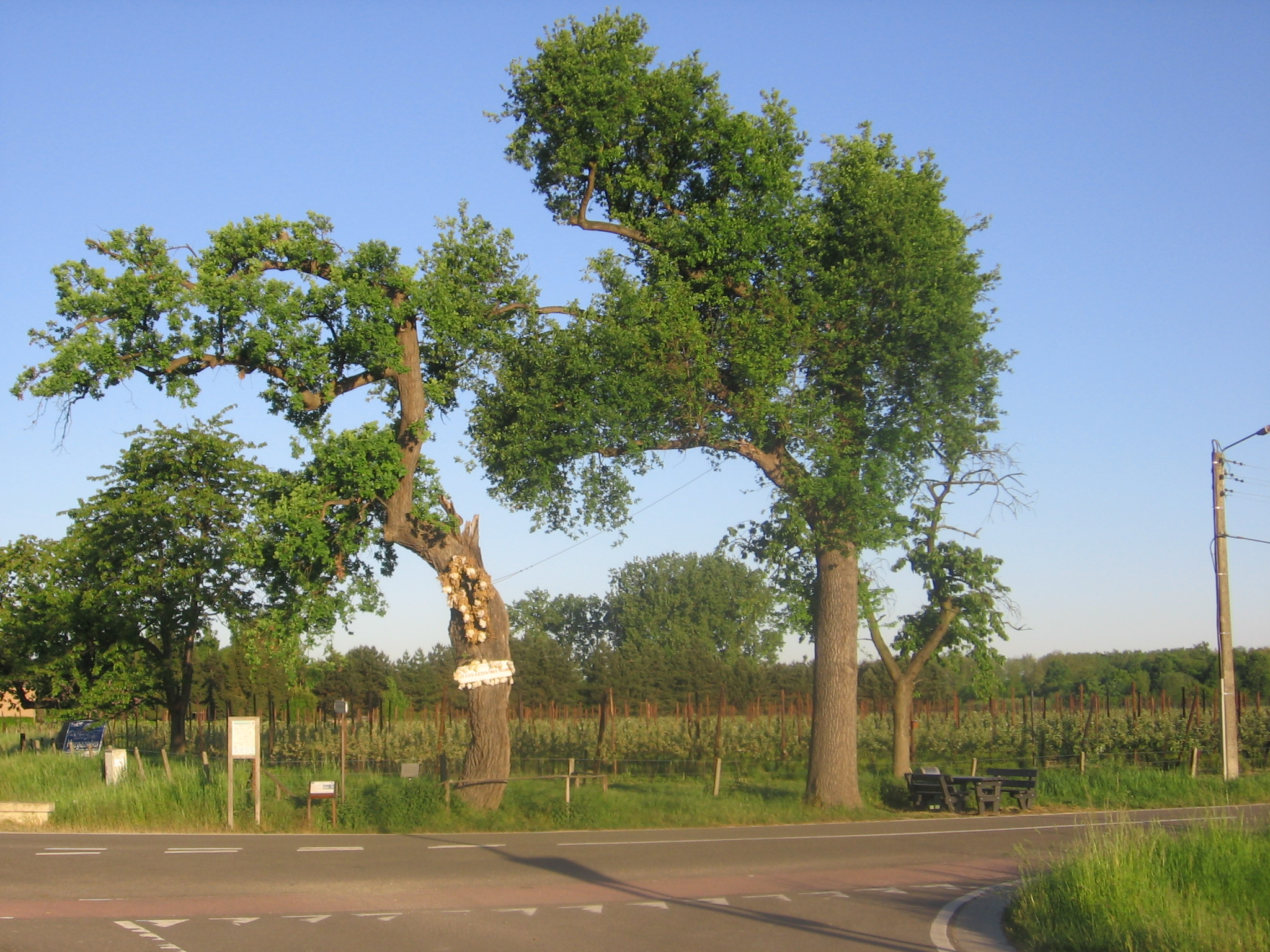
The Onzelievehereboom (left) before its felling by a storm

Onzelievehereboom (or, Onze-Lieve-Hereboom) was the name of an oak tree in Kortessem, Belgium, believed to have been approximately 1200 years old. Its name translates to "our dear lord tree". It was among the oldest trees in Belgium when it was toppled by a storm on the 18th of July, 2009.

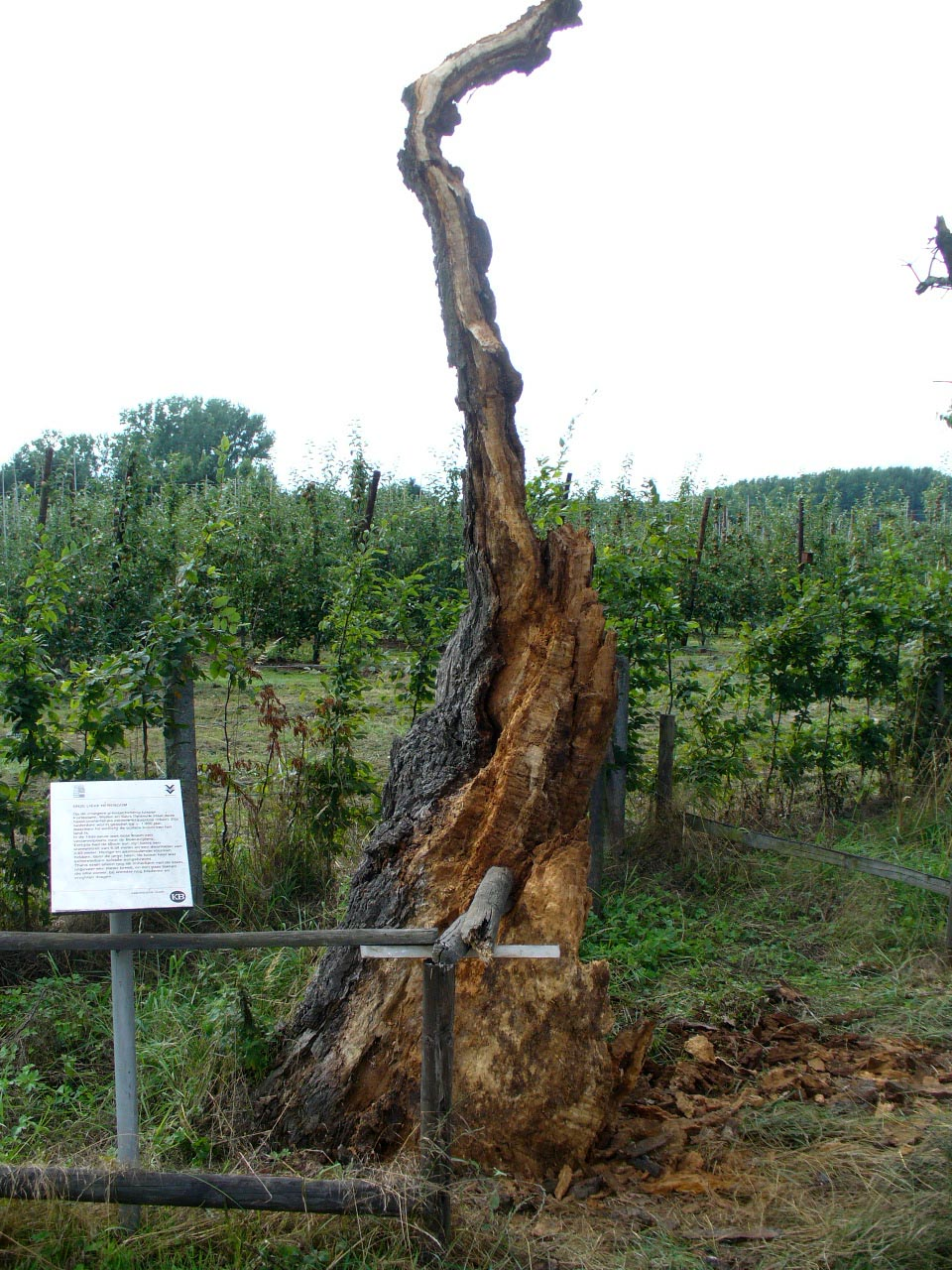
The remaining torn snag
