= William II of the Netherlands =

King of the Netherlands from 1840 to 1849

William II
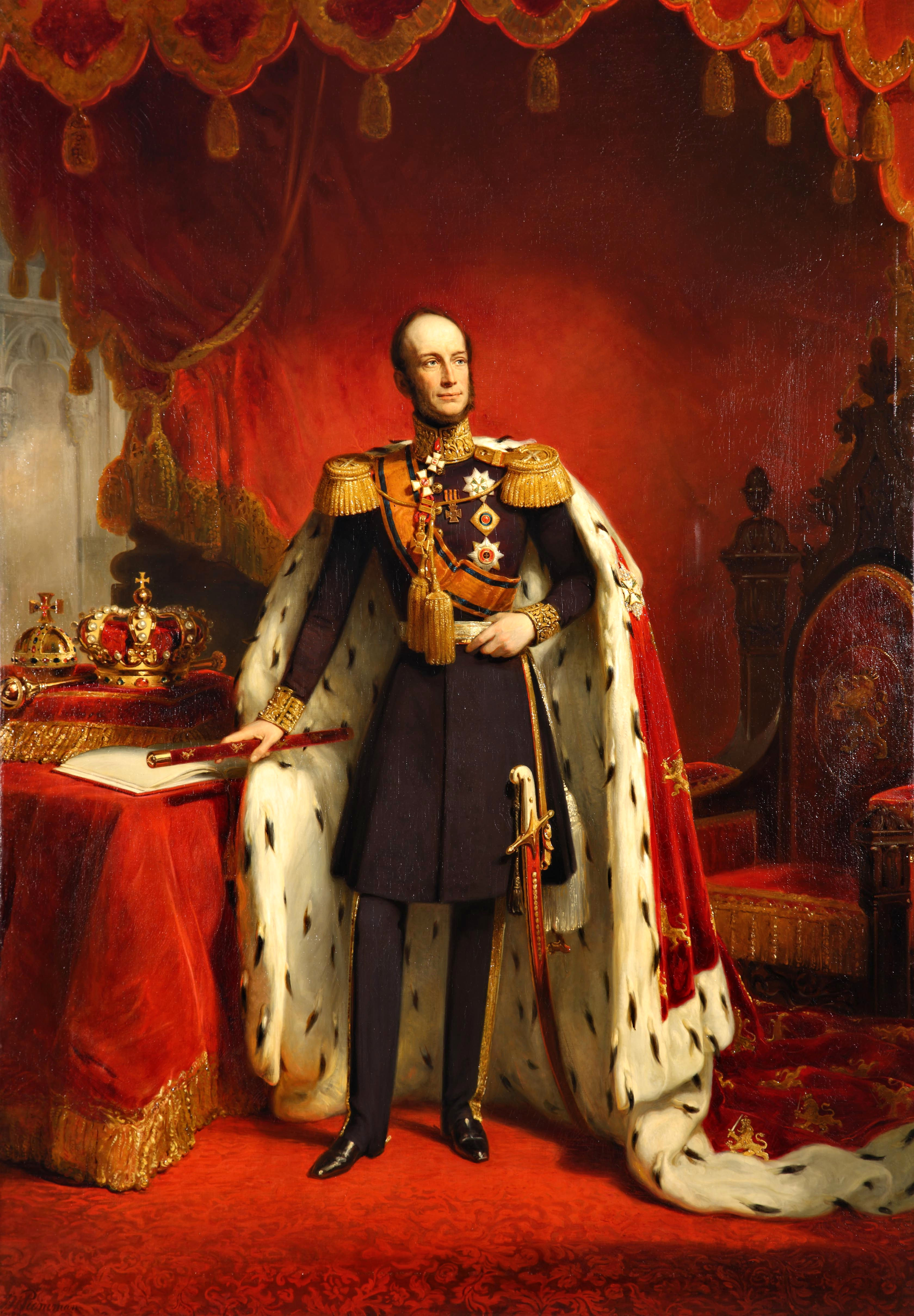
- Portrait by Nicolaas Pieneman, c. 1849

King of the Netherlands; Grand Duke of Luxembourg; Duke of Limburg
- Reign: 7 October 1840 – 17 March 1849
- Inauguration: 28 November 1840
- Predecessor: William I
- Successor: William III
- Born: 6 December 1792; Noordeinde Palace, The Hague, Dutch Republic
- Died: 17 March 1849 (aged 56); Tilburg, Netherlands
- Burial: Nieuwe Kerk, Delft, Netherlands
- Spouse: Anna Pavlovna of Russia (m. 1816)
- Issue: William III of the Netherlands; Prince Alexander; Prince Henry; Prince Ernest Casimir; Sophie, Grand Duchess of Saxe-Weimar-Eisenach
Names
- Dutch: Willem Frederik George Lodewijk; French: Guillaume Frédéric Georges Louis
- House: Orange-Nassau
- Father: William I of the Netherlands
- Mother: Wilhelmine of Prussia

Military service
- Allegiance: United Kingdom; Netherlands
- Branch/service: British Army
- Years of service: 1811–1815
- Rank: General
- Battles/wars: (incomplete): Napoleonic Wars; Peninsular War; Siege of Ciudad Rodrigo; 2nd Siege of Badajoz; 3rd Siege of Badajoz; Battle of Salamanca; Battle of San Millan-Osma; Battle of Vitoria; Siege of Pamplona; Siege of San Sebastián; Battle of the Pyrenees; War of the Sixth Coalition; Hundred Days; Battle of Quatre Bras; Battle of Waterloo (WIA); Belgian Revolution; Assault on Brussels; Ten Days Campaign; Battle of Ravels; Battle of Turnhout; Battle of Houthalen; Battle of Hasselt; Battle of Leuven

William II (Dutch: Willem II, French: Guillaume II; 6 December 1792 – 17 March 1849) was King of the Netherlands, Grand Duke of Luxembourg, and Duke of Limburg from 1840 until his death.

William II was the son of William I and Wilhelmine of Prussia. During the Napoleonic Wars, he fought in the Peninsular War on the British side. He was wounded in action as a commander in the Battle of Waterloo. When his father, who up to that time ruled as sovereign prince, proclaimed himself king in 1815, he became Prince of Orange as heir apparent of the United Kingdom of the Netherlands. During the Belgian Revolution, William tried to broker peace with the rebels and served as commander during the Ten Days Campaign. With the abdication of his father on 7 October 1840, William II became king. During his reign, the Netherlands became a parliamentary democracy with the new constitution of 1848. He reigned for just under nine years, making him the shortest-reigning monarch in Dutch history. William II was married to Anna Pavlovna of Russia, with whom he had five children. William II was succeeded by his son William III.

== Early life and education ==
Willem Frederik George Lodewijk was born on 6 December 1792 in The Hague. He was the eldest son of the then Prince William and Wilhelmine of Prussia. His maternal grandparents were King Frederick William II of Prussia and his second wife Frederika Louisa of Hesse-Darmstadt. William had one younger brother, Frederick, and two younger sisters, Pauline and Marianne.

When William was two, he and his family fled to England after allied British-Hanoverian troops left the republic and entering French troops defeated the army of the United Provinces, claiming liberation by joining the anti-Orangist Patriots. William spent his youth in Berlin at the Prussian court, where he followed a military education and served in the Prussian Army. After this, he studied civil law at Christ Church, University of Oxford.

== Military service ==
He entered the British Army, and in 1811, as a 19-year-old aide-de-camp in the headquarters of Arthur Wellesley, 1st Duke of Wellington, was allowed to observe several of Wellington's campaigns of the Peninsular War. Though not yet 20, the young prince, according to the customs of the time, was made lieutenant colonel on 11 June 1811 and colonel on 21 October that year. He took part in the Siege of Badajoz and the Battle of Salamanca in Spain in 1812. Later that year, on 8 September, he was made an aide-de-camp to the Prince Regent and on 14 December 1813 promoted to major-general. His courage and good nature made him very popular with the British, who nicknamed him "Slender Billy". He returned to the Netherlands in 1813 when his father became sovereign prince, and in May 1814 succeeded Sir Thomas Graham as the highest-ranking officer of the British forces stationed there.

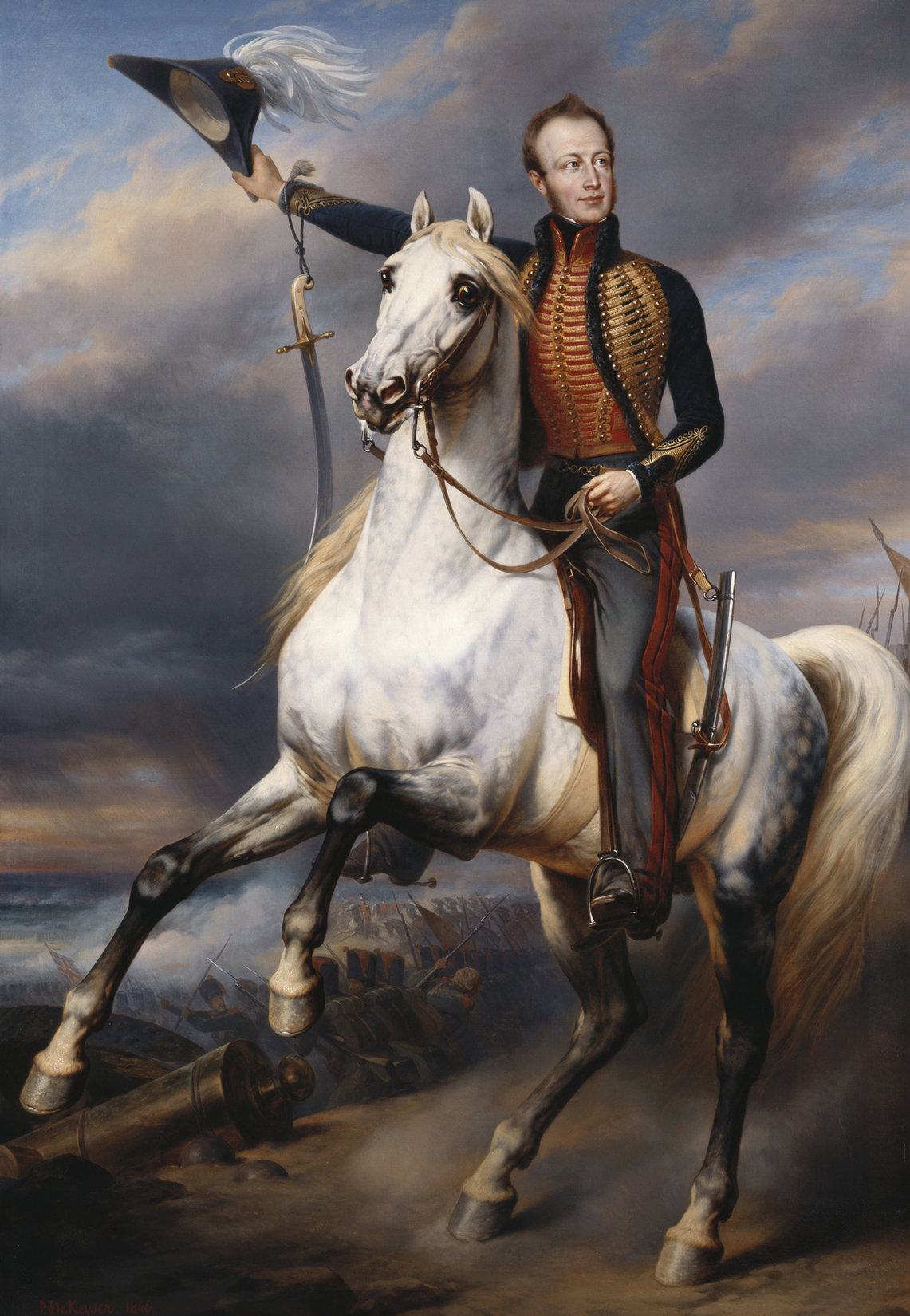
William II at the Battle of Waterloo, by Nicaise de Keyser, 1846

On 8 July 1814, he was promoted to lieutenant-general in the British Army, and on 25 July to general. As such, he was senior officer of the Allied army in the Low Countries when Napoleon I of France escaped from Elba in 1815. He relinquished command on the arrival of the Duke of Wellington, and, though this was his first real battle, served as commander of the I Allied Corps, first at the Battle of Quatre Bras (16 June 1815) and then at the Battle of Waterloo (18 June 1815), where he was wounded in his left shoulder by a musket ball. He was aged 22. As a sign of gratitude for what the Dutch throne styled "his" victory at Waterloo, William was offered Soestdijk Palace by the Dutch people.

Military historian William Siborne blamed many casualties suffered by Coalition forces during the Waterloo campaign to William's inexperience. In response, Siborne was accused by Lieutenant-General Willem Jan Knoop of misrepresenting William's actions at Waterloo. An inspection into the archives of Siborne by Dutch officer Francois de Bas in 1897 claimed to discover the "selective use of sources" and "numerous miscounts and untruths".

== Marriage ==
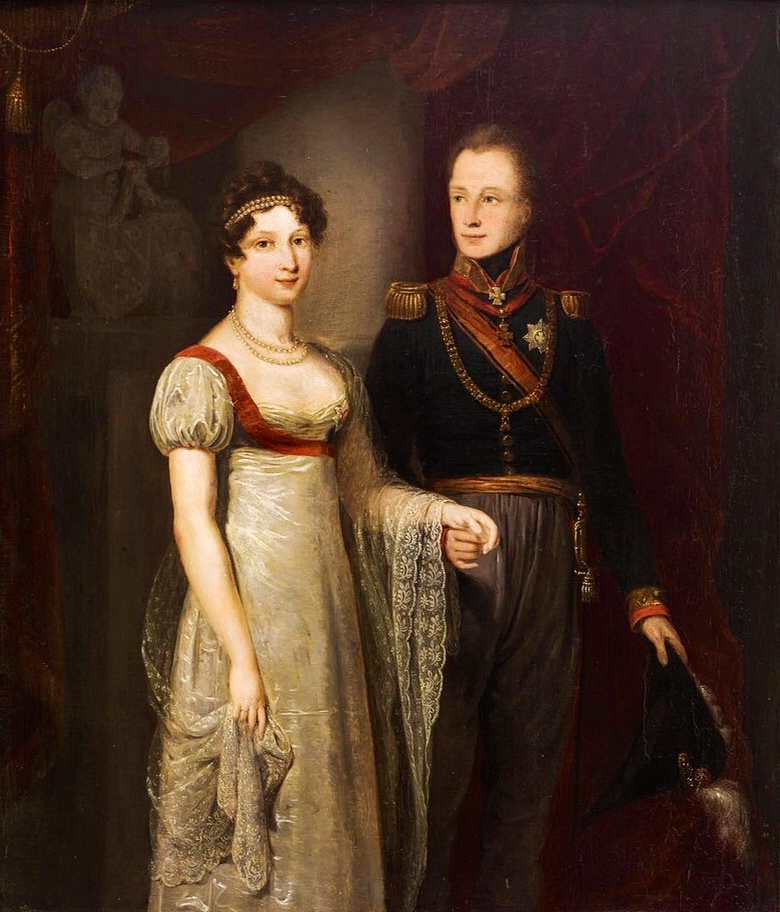
Portrait of William II and Anna Pavlovna (1816) by Jan Willem Pieneman

In 1814, William was briefly engaged to Princess Charlotte of Wales, only child of the Prince Regent (later George IV of the United Kingdom) and his estranged wife, Caroline of Brunswick. The engagement was arranged by the Prince Regent, but it was broken off because Charlotte's mother was against the marriage and because Charlotte did not want to move to the Netherlands.

On 21 February 1816 at the Chapel of the Winter Palace in St. Petersburg, William married Grand Duchess Anna Pavlovna of Russia, youngest sister to Tsar Alexander I of Russia, who arranged the marriage to seal the good relations between Imperial Russia and the Netherlands. On 17 February 1817 in Brussels, his first son, William, the future King William III, was born.

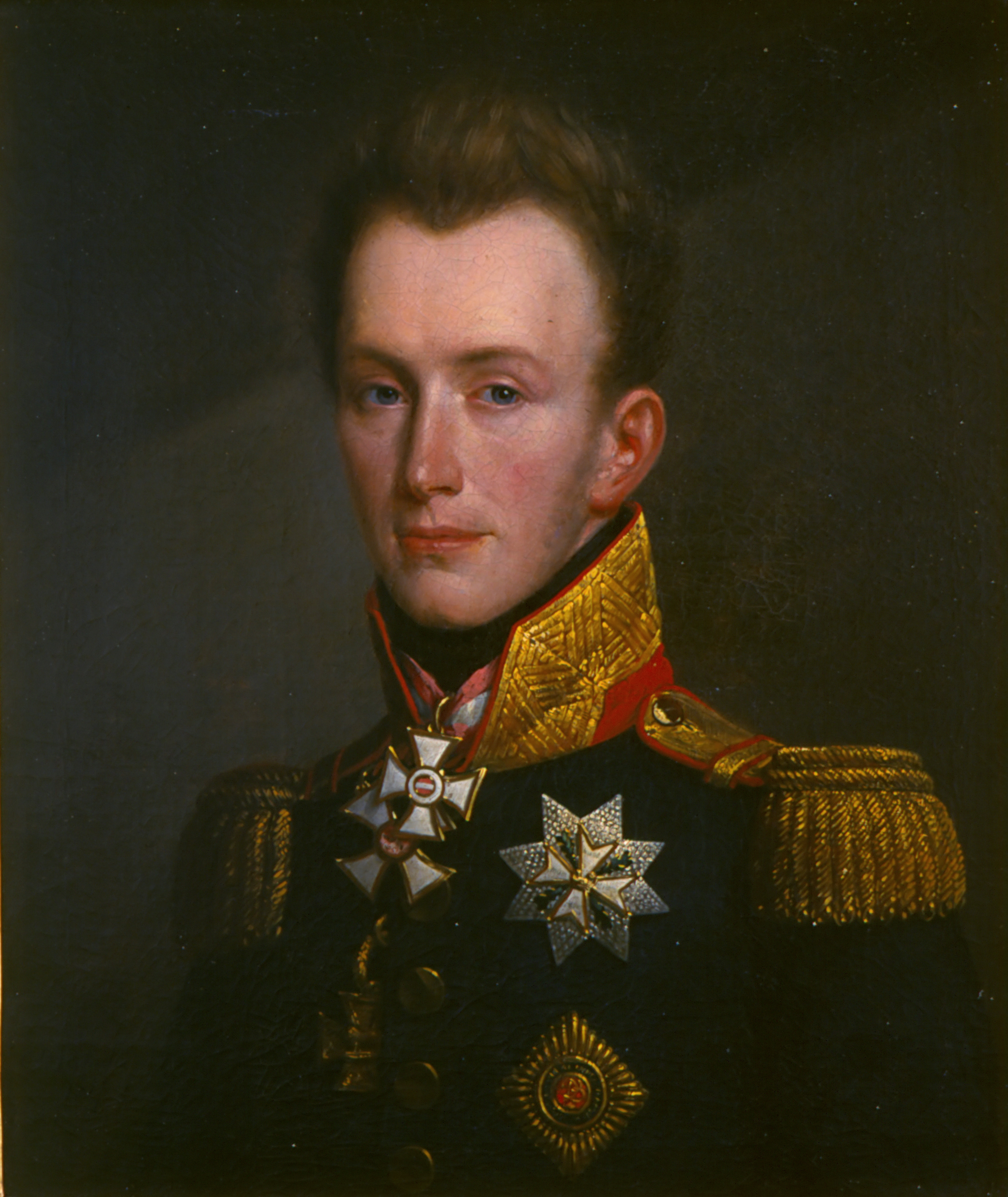
Portrait of William II, painted in 1817 by Karel Pieter Verhulst

In 1819, he was blackmailed over what Minister of Justice Van Maanen termed in a letter his "shameful and unnatural lusts": presumably bisexuality. Separately, his signing the constitutional reform of 1848, enabling a parliamentary democracy, may have been partly influenced by blackmail. He may also have had a relationship with a dandy by the name of Pereira.

== Belgian Revolution ==
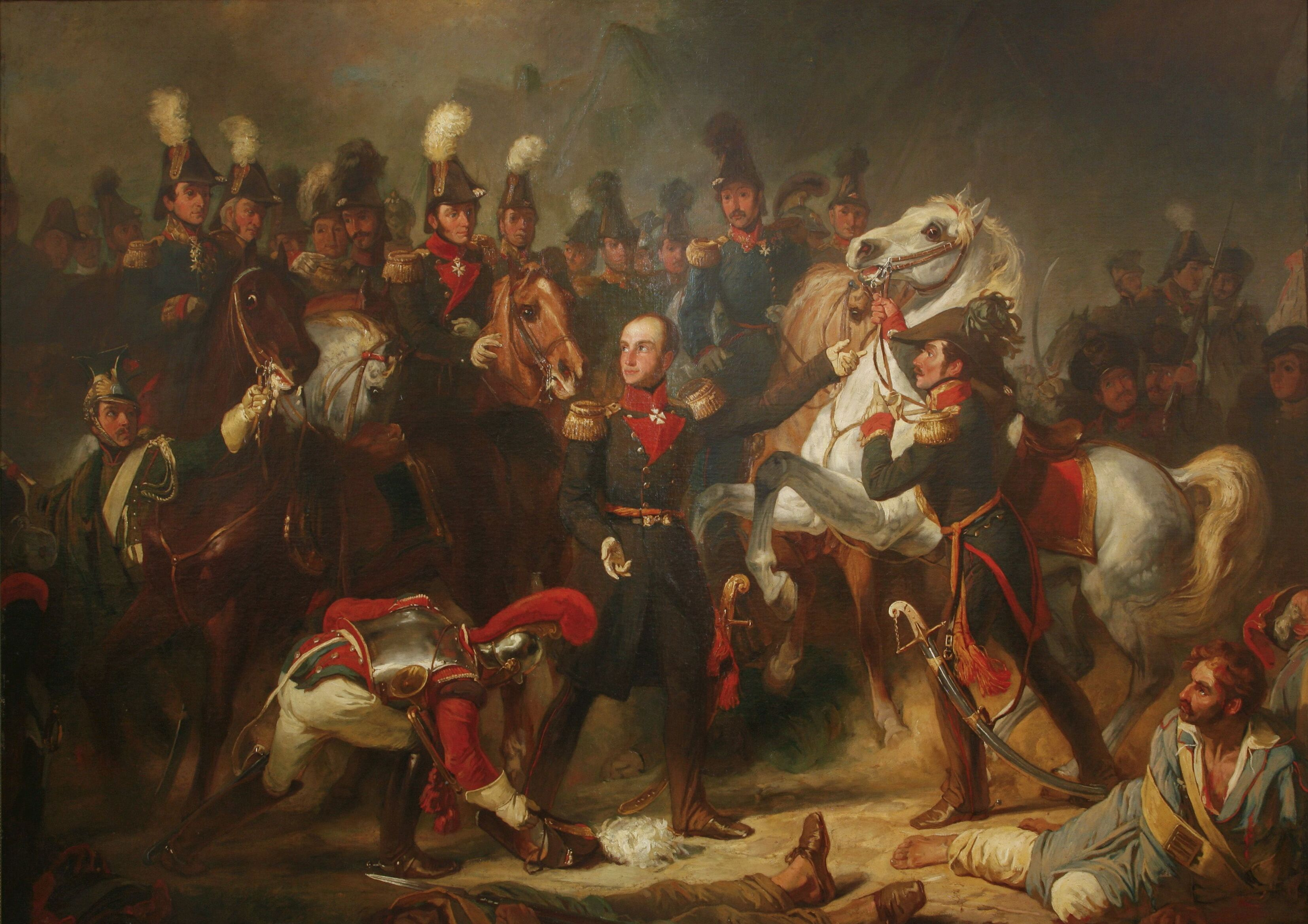
The Prince of Orange at the Ten Days' Campaign

William II enjoyed considerable popularity in what is now Belgium (then the Southern Netherlands), as well as in parts of the rest of the Netherlands for his affability and moderation, and in 1830, on the outbreak of the Belgian Revolution, he did his utmost in Brussels as a peace broker, to bring about a settlement based on administrative autonomy for the southern provinces, under the House of Orange-Nassau. His father then rejected the terms of accommodation that he had proposed without further consultation; afterwards, relations with his father were once again tense.

In April 1831, William II was sent by his father to be the military leader during the Ten Days' Campaign in order to recover what would become Belgium. Although initially successful, the Dutch withdrew after French intervention on the side of the rebels. European mediation established Leopold of Saxe-Coburg-Gotha (widower of William's former fiancée, Charlotte) on the throne of a new monarchy. Peace was finally established in 1839 when Belgium was recognized by the Netherlands.

== Reign ==
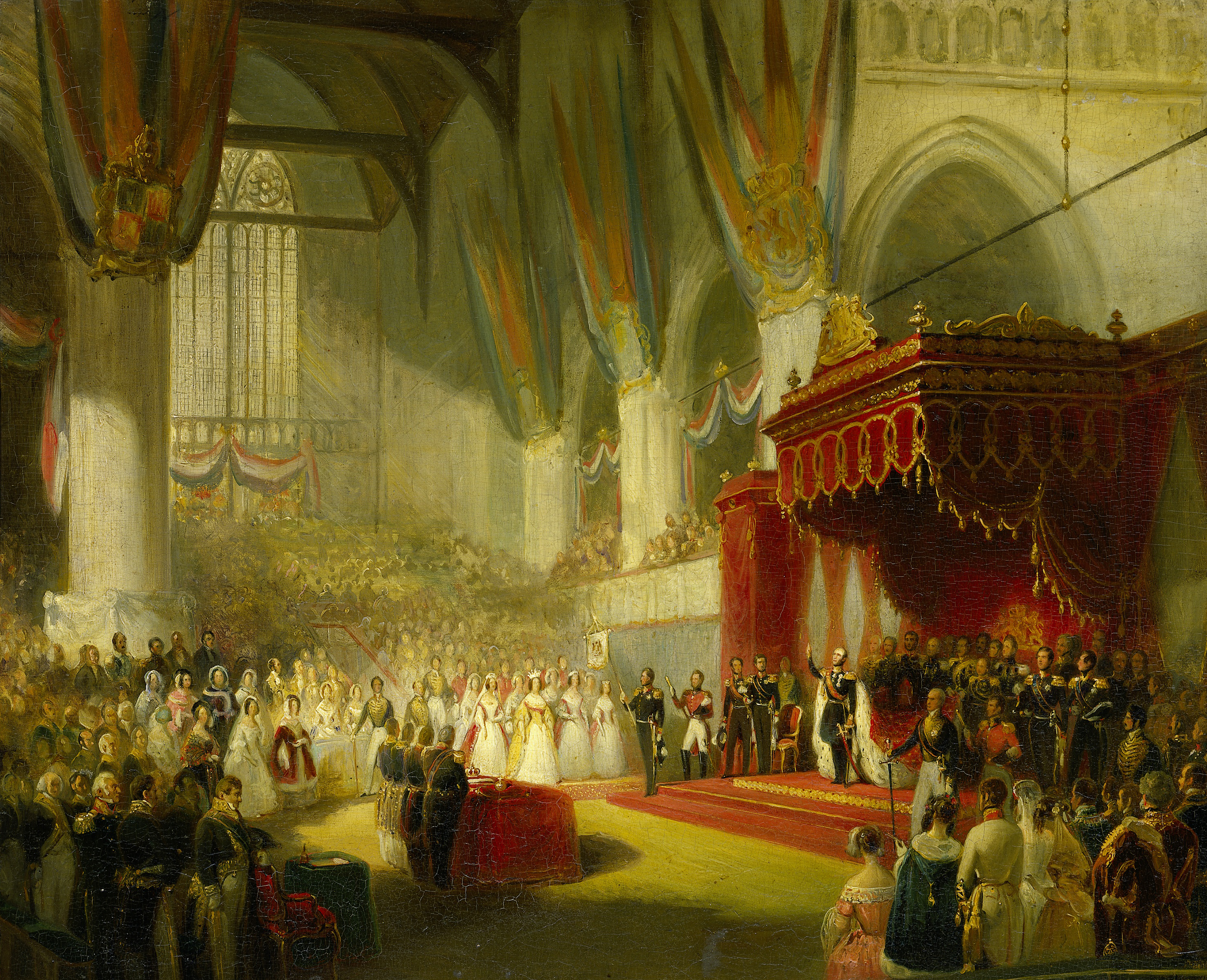
The inauguration of William II on 28 November 1840, by Nicolaas Pieneman

On 7 October 1840, on his father's abdication, he acceded to the throne as William II. Although he shared his father's conservative inclinations, he did not intervene in governmental affairs nearly as much as his father had. There was increased agitation for broad constitutional reform and a wider electoral franchise.

1847 had been a year of political unrest. The Netherlands had seen food riots in the Northern Provinces and a plot had been discovered to murder the King and his eldest son. William II's personal life was fraught with difficulties as well. The king had for some time been in very poor health. He suffered from heart disease (among other things) and his doctor had told the family he didn't have long to live. On top of that, William´s beloved second son Prince Alexander had fallen ill in January 1847 and the 29-year-old's condition became increasingly concerning as the year continued. Prince Alexander went to Madeira to winter in a warm climate, but his health only worsened further and his desperate father sent his own personal physician to the island in a last bid attempt to save his son's life. Alexander would eventually die on 20 March 1848.

The Revolutions of 1848 broke out all over Europe. In Paris the July Monarchy fell in February 1848. Warned that the revolution might spread to the Netherlands next, William decided to institute a more liberal regime, believing it was better to grant reforms instead of having them imposed on him on less favourable terms later. As he later put it, "I changed from conservative to liberal in one night". He chose a committee headed by the prominent liberal Johan Rudolf Thorbecke to create a new constitution, which was instituted on 17 March 1848.

The new document designed by the constitutional committee provided that the Eerste Kamer (Senate), previously appointed by the king, would be elected indirectly by the provincial states. The Tweede Kamer (House of Representatives), previously elected by the provincial states, would be elected directly via census suffrage in electoral districts, with the franchise limited to those who paid a certain amount in taxes. The most significant change, however, was the curbing of royal power. The king had previously been a near-autocrat, and ministers were responsible solely to him. The new constitution made the ministers fully responsible to the Tweede Kamer. For all intents and purposes, the real power passed to the Tweede Kamer, and the king was now a servant of government rather than its master. The constitution of 1848 has been amended numerous times since (most notably by the replacement of census suffrage by universal manhood suffrage and districts with nationwide party-list proportional representation, both in 1917).

William swore in his first and only cabinet under the terms of the new constitution a few months before his sudden death in Tilburg, North Brabant, in 1849.

== Honours ==
Monogram of William II

- Netherlands: Grand Cross of the Military William Order, 8 July 1815
- Luxembourg: Founder of the Order of the Oak Crown, 29 December 1841
- Baden:
  - Knight of the House Order of Fidelity, 1841
  - Grand Cross of the Order of the Zähringer Lion, 1841
- Kingdom of Hanover:
  - Knight of the Order of St. George, 1840
  - Grand Cross of the Royal Guelphic Order
- Kingdom of Prussia: Knight of the Order of the Black Eagle, 17 December 1808
- Russian Empire:
  - Knight of the Order of St. Andrew, 22 June 1814
  - Knight of the Order of St. Alexander Nevsky, 22 June 1814
  - Knight of the Order of St. George, 2nd Class, 8 July 1815
- Austrian Empire: Commander of the Military Order of Maria Theresa
- Saxe-Weimar-Eisenach: Grand Cross of the Order of the White Falcon, 24 June 1838
- Spain: Knight of the Order of the Golden Fleece, 18 September 1814
- United Kingdom:
  - Army Gold Cross with two clasps, 1811–1813
  - Knight Grand Cross of the Order of the Bath, 14 August 1814 (KB) and 2 January 1815 (GCB)
- Württemberg: Grand Cross of the Military Merit Order, 1819

== Relationships ==
William II had a string of relationships with both men and women, which led him to be blackmailed. The homosexual relationships that William II had as crown prince and as king were reported by journalist Eillert Meteer. The king surrounded himself with male servants whom he could not dismiss because of what Meteer described as his "abominable motives" for hiring them in the first place. One of his closest friends was the Wallonian aristocrat Albéric du Chastel. William II was blackmailed for the first time for his intimacies with men in 1818. After the Dutch secret police captured the blackmailers they were deported to the Dutch overseas colonies.

== In fiction ==
William II is a recurring character in the historical novels of Georgette Heyer, most notably in An Infamous Army.

William appears as a character in the historical fiction novel Sharpe's Waterloo by Bernard Cornwell, and its television adaptation, in which he is portrayed by Paul Bettany, and is largely shown to be a well-meaning, but arrogant, incompetent commander, directly responsible for the deaths of many of the men under his command.

== Issue ==
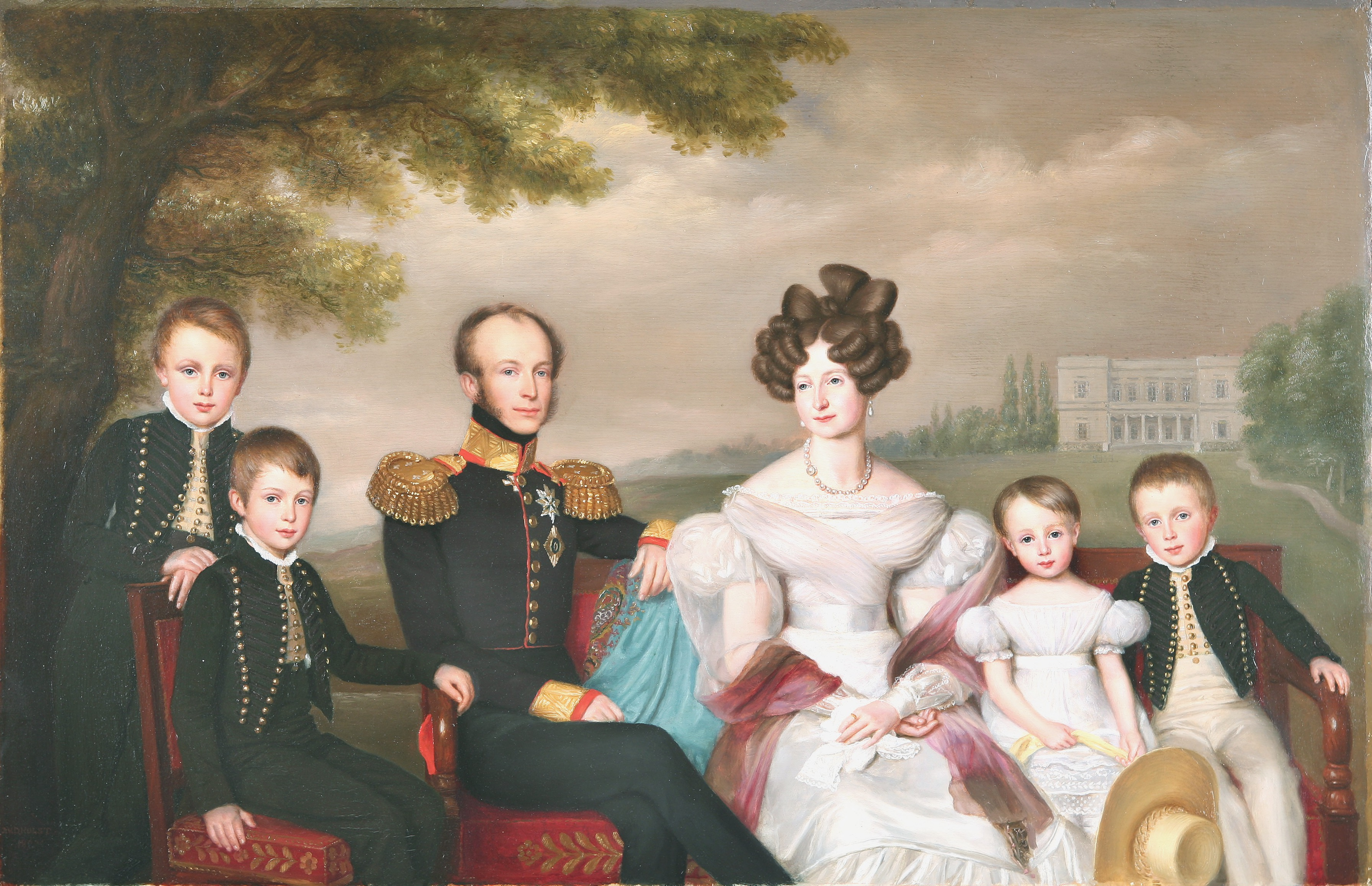
King William II and His Family (1832) by Jan Baptist van der Hulst

William II and queen Anna Pavlovna had five children:

- William Alexander Paul Frederick Louis (19 February 1817 – 23 November 1890), William III, King of the Netherlands (1849 to 1890). Married firstly Sophie of Württemberg and had issue. Married secondly Emma of Waldeck and Pyrmont and had issue, Queen Wilhelmina.
- William Alexander Frederick Constantine Nicholas Michael (2 August 1818 – 20 February 1848). Nicknamed Sasha. Never married.
- William Frederick Henry "the Navigator" (13 June 1820 – 13 January 1879). Married firstly Princess Amalia of Saxe-Weimar-Eisenach and secondly Princess Marie of Prussia, but had no issue.
- Prince William Alexander Frederick Ernest Casimir (21 May 1822 – 22 October 1822), died in infancy; he had hydrocephalus.
- Wilhelmina Marie Sophie Louise (8 April 1824 – 23 March 1897). Married Karl Alexander, Grand Duke of Saxe-Weimar-Eisenach, and had issue.

== Namesakes ==
- Orange, New South Wales, Australian city named for William II by Thomas Mitchell
- Place Guillaume II, a square in Luxembourg City
- Willem II (football club), a Dutch football club from Tilburg named after the king

=== Ship ===
The passenger and cargo vessel Koning Willem de Tweede was built in Fop Smit's shipyards, completed on 8 December 1840. It was wrecked off the coast of the colony of South Australia in 1857, with the loss of 16 crew.

William II of the Netherlands House of Orange-Nassau Cadet branch of the House of Nassau Born: 6 December 1792 Died: 17 March 1849
Regnal titles
Preceded by William I	King of the Netherlands; Grand Duke of Luxembourg; Duke of Limburg; 1840–1849	Succeeded by William III
Dutch royalty
Preceded by William (I)	Prince of Orange; 1815–1840	Succeeded by William (III)
