= Wintershoven =

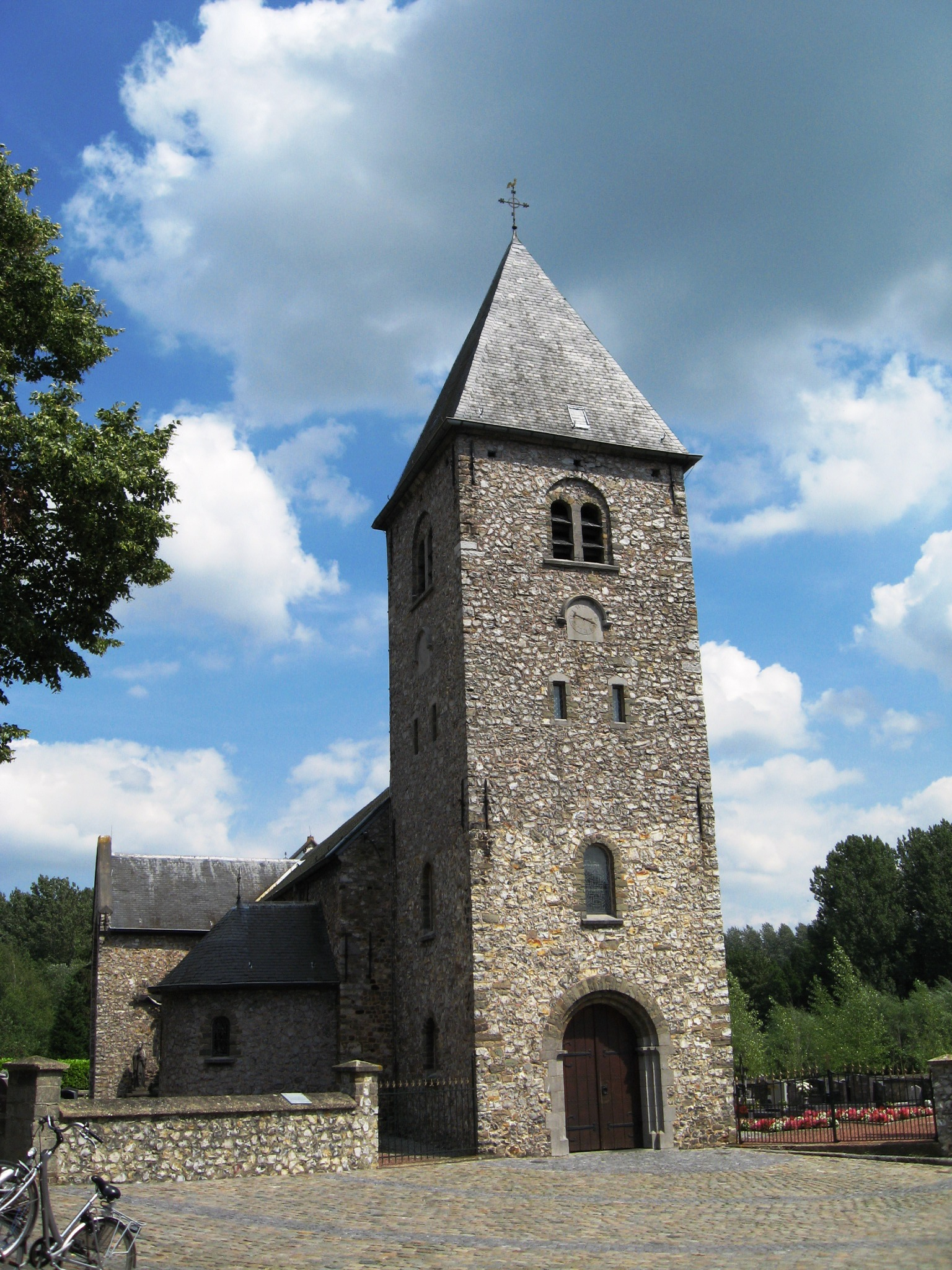
- Wintershoven, the church (11th-12th century)

- Location within Belgium Location within Europe
- Coordinates: 50°51′06″N 05°25′08″E
- Country: Belgium
- Region: Flanders
- Province: Limburg (Belgium)
- Municipality: Kortessem

Wintershoven is a village and a district in the municipality of Kortessem, in the province of Limburg, Belgium.

The village church is a Romanesque building from the 11th–12th centuries. It was renovated in 1891–1893, and is a classified historical monument since 1936.
