= Charles Niellon =

- Bust of Charles Niellon
- Born: 15 February 1795; Strasbourg, France
- Died: 26 February 1871 (aged 76); Laeken, Belgium
- Burial place: Laeken Cemetery
- Military career
- Allegiance: France; Belgium
- Branch: French Army; Belgian Army
- Rank: Brigadier general
- Units: 23rd Light Infantry Regiment; 2nd Light Infantry Regiment; 5th Hussar Regiment
- Conflicts: Napoleonic Wars; Battle of Lützen; Battle of Bautzen; Battle of Leipzig; Belgian Revolution; Ten Days' Campaign
- Awards: Knight of the Order of Leopold (1833); Iron Cross (1835)

Charles Niellon (1795–1871) was a veteran of the Napoleonic Wars who fought in the Belgian Revolution of 1830 and was later naturalised as a Belgian.

== Life ==
Niellon was born in Strasbourg, then French territory, on 15 February 1795. He served in the Napoleonic 23rd regiment of light infantry, enrolling on 9 January 1812, and was rapidly promoted corporal, fourrier, sergeant and sergeant-major. In May 1813 he took part in the battles of Lützen and Bautzen. In October he fought in the Battle of Leipzig, at which he was captured, becoming a prisoner of war on 19 October 1813. Released on 1 June 1814, he became sergeant-major of the 2nd regiment of light infantry in 1815, and in 1816 chief sergeant of the 5th regiment of hussars.

After being discharged from the French army, Niellon settled in Belgium, where he became an editor of the newspaper La Minerve. In August 1830 he joined the Belgian Revolution as a captain in the Garde Civique, and he quickly became aide-de-camp to General d'Hoogvorst, and then adjudant-major to the general staff. On 26 September, he led a force of volunteers in a counterattack on the Dutch troops threatening Brussels from Schaarbeek. On 27 September, he re-established communications between Brussels and Leuven. In recognition of his abilities and achievements he was appointed lieutenant-colonel in the regular army, in which capacity he liberated Lier from the Dutch, and on 27 October entered Antwerp. On 29 October, he was promoted brigadier general. He was one of the leading commanders of Belgian forces in the Ten Days' Campaign of 1831.

In 1833 he retired to Burtonville (Luxembourg). He was naturalised Belgian by an act of the Belgian parliament on 14 March 1837. He died in Laken on 26 February 1871, leaving a widow with five children. On 15 July, the Chamber of Representatives unanimously accepted a proposal to provide a state pension to his widow, which was passed by the Senate on 21 July.

== Publications ==
- Histoire des événements militaires et des conspirations orangistes de la révolution de Belgique de 1830 à 1833 (Brussels, M. J. Poot, 1868)

== Honours ==
- Knight of the Order of Leopold (15 December 1833), with iron cross (2 April 1835)
