= Battle of Hasselt =

Battle

Coordinates: 50.9167°N 5.3333°E

- Part of the Ten Days' Campaign
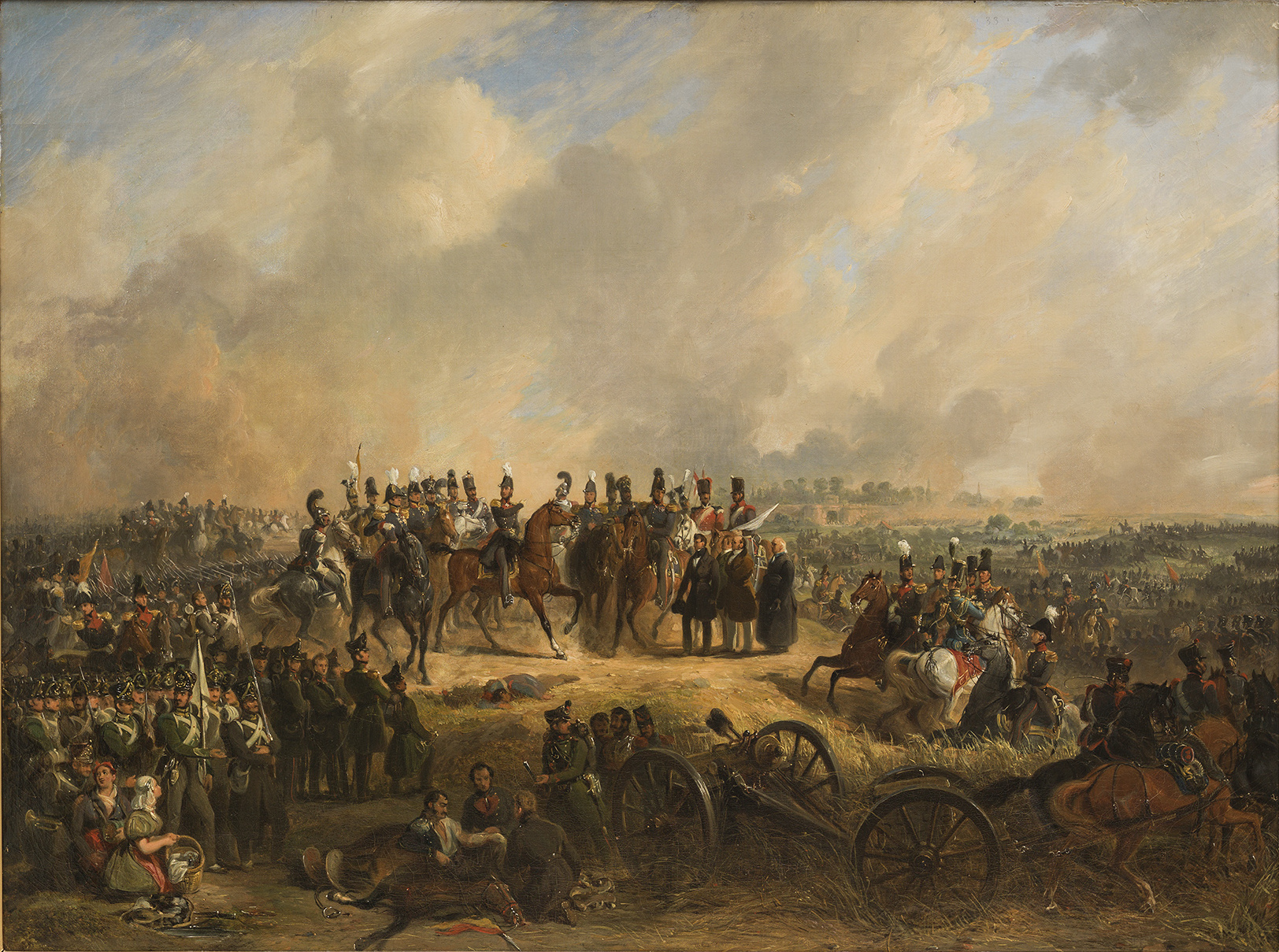
- Jan Willem Pieneman: Battle of Hasselt
Date	8 August 1831
Location	Hasselt, Belgium
Result	Dutch victory

Belligerents
Netherlands	Belgian rebels

Commanders and leaders
(Netherlands) Prince William	(Belgium) Nicolas Daine

Strength
36,000 men	14,500 men

Casualties and losses
Low	Heavy casualties 400 Prisoners

The Battle of Hasselt was fought on 8 August 1831 during the Ten Days' Campaign. It was an important defeat for the outnumbered Belgian Army of the Meuse and a victory for the Dutch invasion force.

== Battle ==
The Dutch planned to encircle the Belgians with three divisions with no option to retreat because doing so would leave the Dutch city Maastricht undefended for a possible Belgian counterattack.

The Belgians, outnumbered and with little to no artillery, misled one of the Dutch divisions by spending too much time in attacking the small town of Kuringen just outside Hasselt and left a small force behind in Hasselt to buy some time and cover their retreat to Tongeren. During this retreat they were under constant attack of the chasing Dutch cavalry. At Kortessem the Belgians put up a few artillery guns and the Dutch ended the chase leaving the Meuse army in a state of chaos, the remaining rebels fled to Liège escaping the pocket the Dutch tried to enforce.

The Dutch took about 400 prisoners. The rebels suffered heavy casualties while the Dutch losses were said to be very small but numbers are unknown.

== Sources ==
- Kolenbrander, H.T. (1936) De afscheiding van België, Amsterdam: J.M. Meulenhoff.
- Nater, J.H. (1980), De tiendaagse veldtocht; de Belgische opstand 1830/1831, Bussum: Unieboek b.v.
