= Johanna Aleida Budde =

Dutch painter and draughtswoman

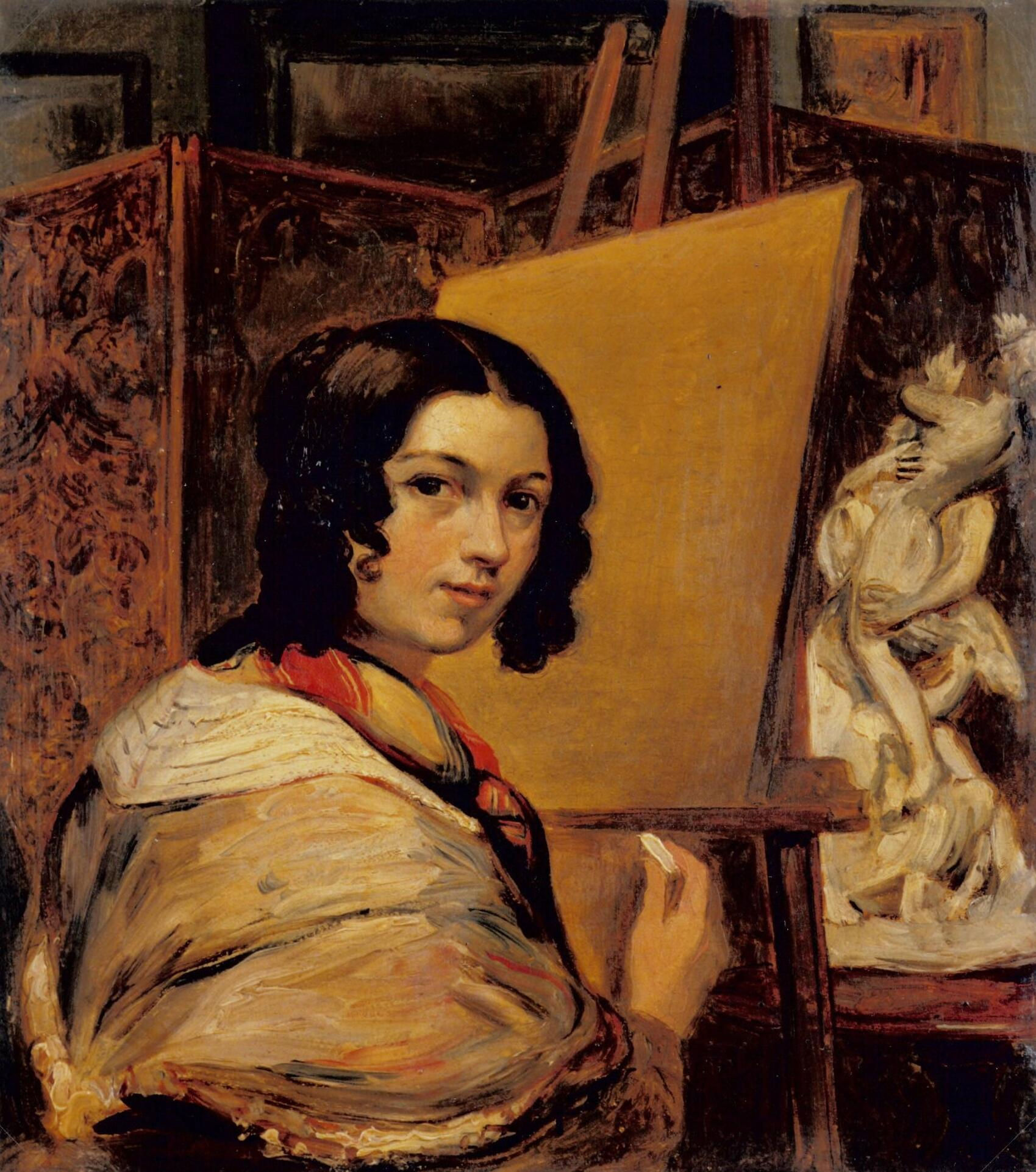
- Self-portrait (c. 1820–1840)
- Born: April 6, 1800; Deventer
- Died: August 13, 1852 (aged 52); Diepenveen
- Education: Koninklijke Academie voor Beeldende Kunsten (Amsterdam)
- Known for: Painting
- Parents: Hendrik Budde (father); Maria Margaretha Cost (mother)

Johanna Aleida Budde (6 April 1800 – 13 August 1852) was a Dutch painter and draughtswoman.

== Biography ==
=== Origins ===
Johanna Budde was the eldest child of a wealthy family of four children. Her father, Hendrik Budde (1773–1851), was a merchant in Rotterdam and later a military intendant in Gelderland and Overijssel. Her mother, Maria Margaretha Cost (1779–1848), was the daughter of Willem Herman Cost, a prominent city administrator of Deventer. The family moved regularly. Until 1803 they lived in Deventer, from 1809 to 1813 in Rotterdam, and then in Zutphen. In 1823 Willem Cost died and Johanna's mother inherited the country house De Roobrug in Diepenveen. A year later the Budde family settled there permanently.

=== Painting ===
Johanna showed an aptitude for drawing and painting and was taught by the history painter Jan Willem Pieneman. His style is clearly recognisable in her work. The sketchbooks that have been preserved by Budde show an eye for detail and a trained hand in drawing. Budde mainly painted portraits and genre pieces, which almost always depict family members or acquaintances. She also made a few still lifes and landscapes, both of the area around De Roobrug and of views she drew on trips through the Netherlands and Germany. One of Budde's best works is a family portrait depicting Albertus Jacobus Duymaer van Twist and his wife to be Maria Johanna Beck, playing chess at a table among various family members in the Westervoorde house in Olst.

=== Reputation ===
According to the art historian and biographer Johannes Immerzeel, Johanna Budde did not have to paint for a living. Yet she was quite active as an artist and she left behind a fairly large oeuvre. Between 1830 and 1844 Budde exhibited regularly at the national Exhibitions of Living Masters. She rarely offered her work for sale at these exhibitions, but when she did, she charged hefty prices. At the exhibition of Overijssel industry of 1840 in Zwolle, for example, she asked five hundred guilders for the painting Een oud dichter in zijn studeervertrek ("An old poet in his study"). This made it the most expensive painting in the exhibition. From 1833 Johanna Budde was a member of the Koninklijke Akademie van Beeldende Kunsten (Amsterdam) in Amsterdam.

=== Death and legacy ===
Johanna Budde remained unmarried and always lived in the parental country house De Roobrug. She died of tuberculosis there in 1852. After her death she was forgotten. Today only the J. A. Buddestraat in Deventer evidences her existence. The Historisch Museum Deventer owns several of her works.

Selected works
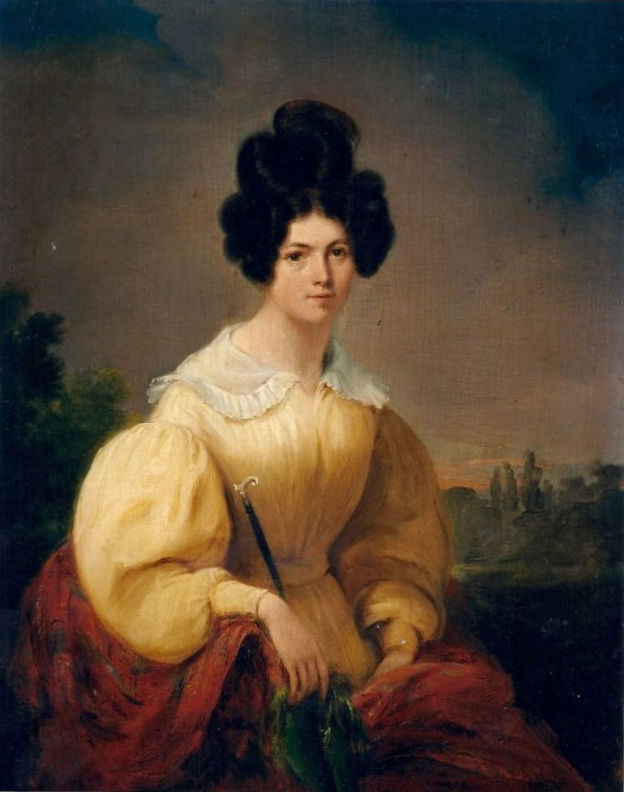
Self-portrait (c. 1835)

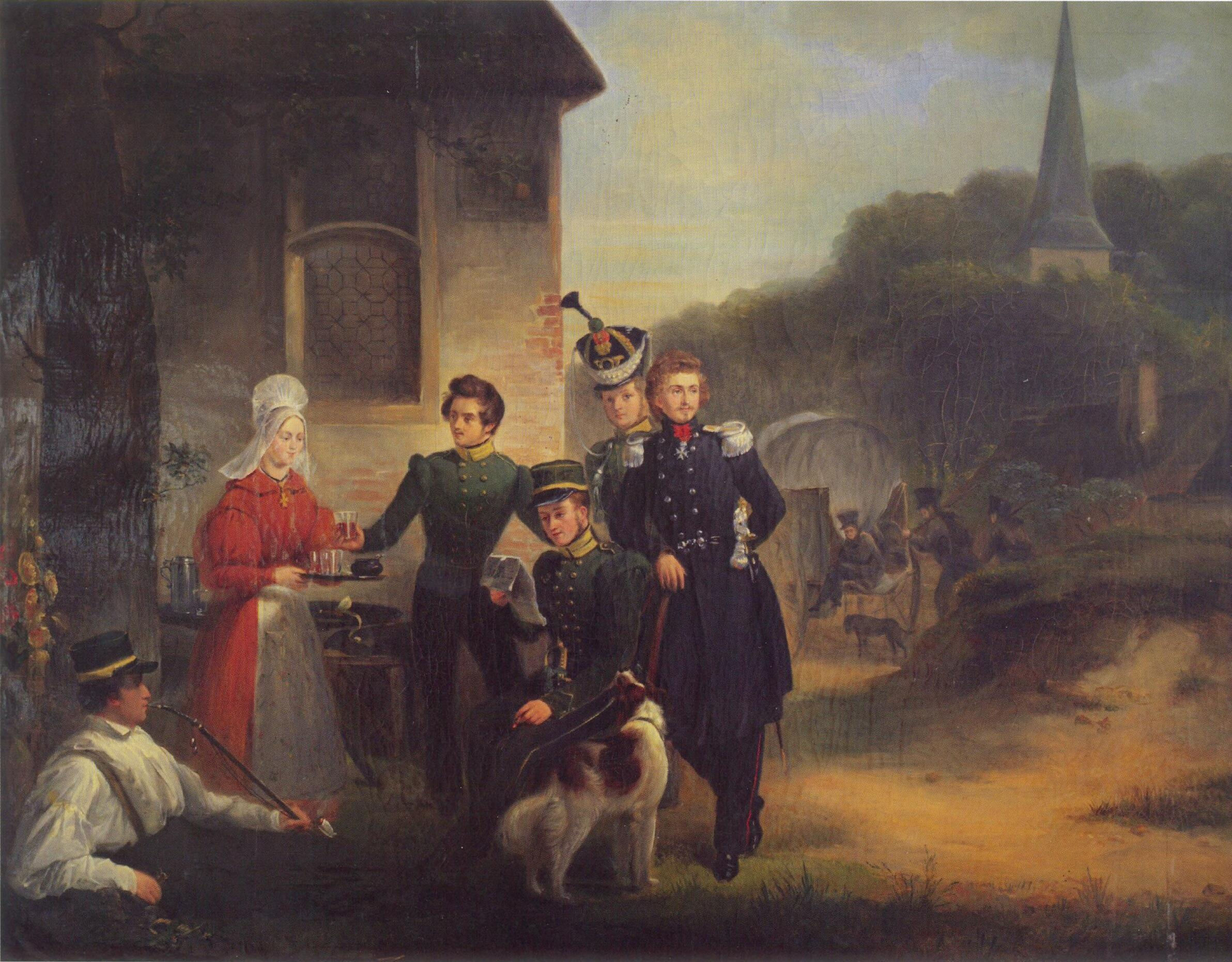
A group of Jagers during the Ten days' campaign (c. 1835)

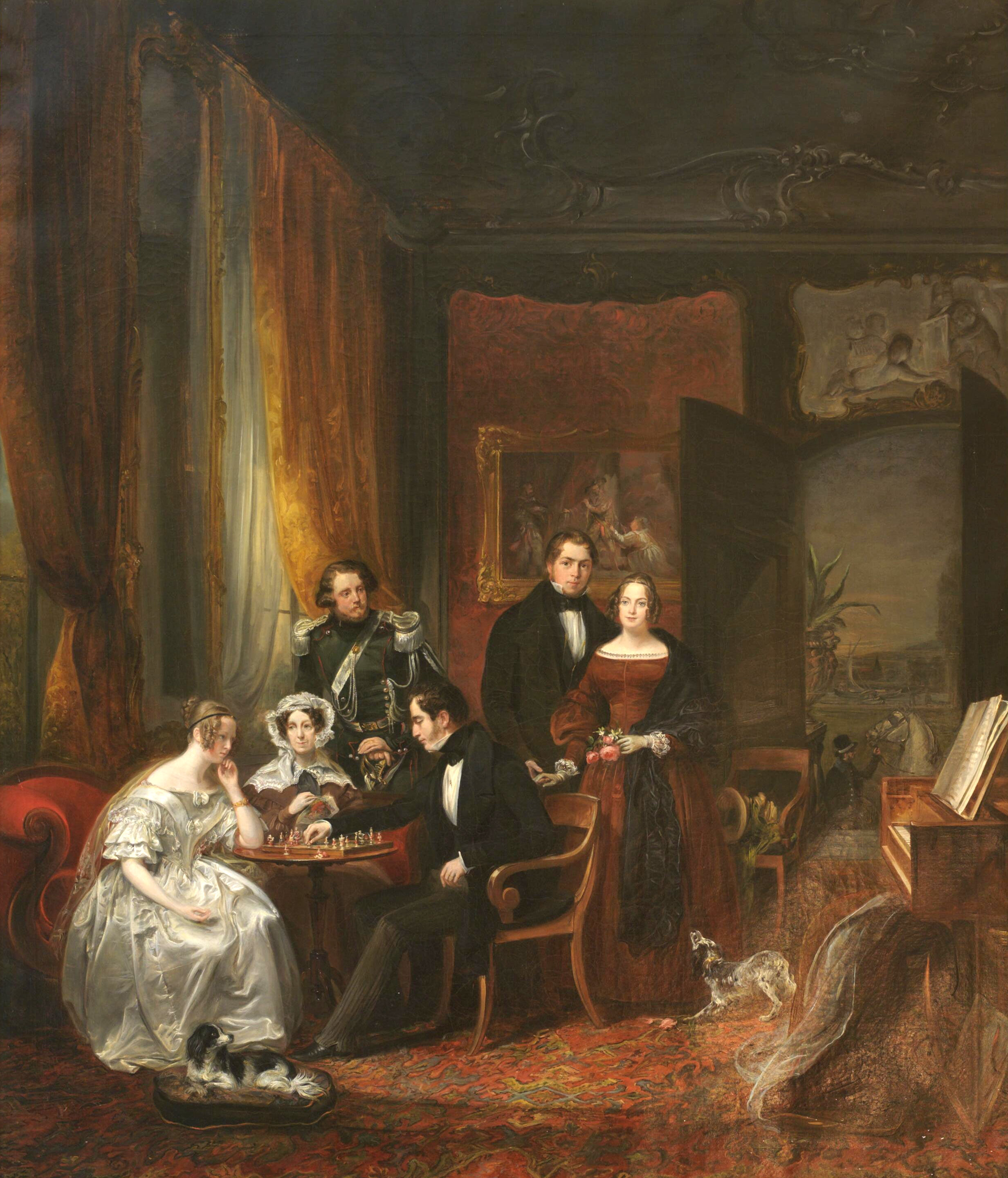
Family portrait of Albertus Jacobus Duymaer van Twist (1837)

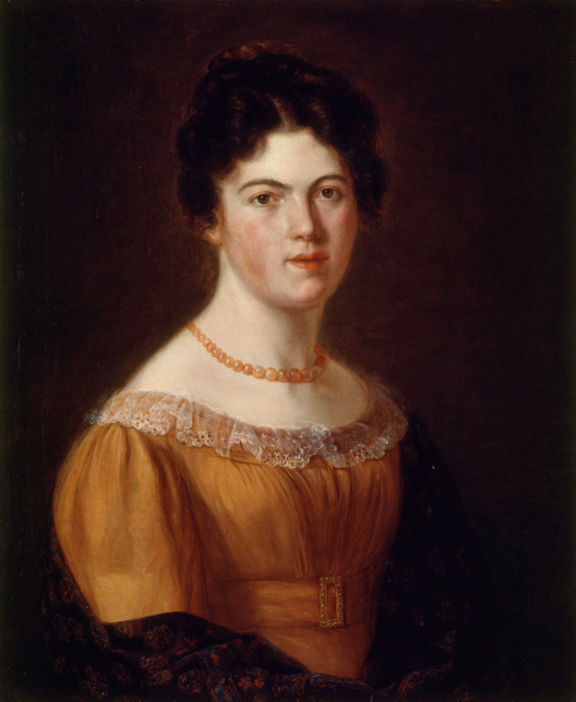
Self-portrait (1840)
