= Battle of Ravels =

- Part of the Ten Days' Campaign, and Belgian Revolution
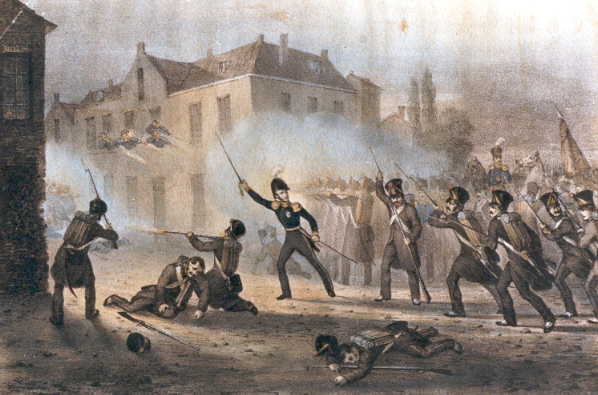
- Prince William leading troops at the Battle of Ravels.
| Date | 3 August 1831 |
| Location | Ravels, Belgium |
| Result | Dutch victory |

Belligerents
| Netherlands | Belgian rebels |

Commanders and leaders
| (Netherlands) Prince William | (France) Charles Niëllon |

Strength
| 800 soldiers | 1,000–1,200 soldiers |

Casualties and losses
| 2 dead, 25 wounded | 5 dead, 12 wounded |

The Battle of Ravels was a skirmish during the Ten Days' Campaign at the end of the Belgian Revolution. This battle took place on 3 August 1831.

Following the declaration of Belgian independence, the Prince of Orange led an army to recapture territory lost to the Netherlands. The first battle of the campaign took place in Ravels.

The outnumbered Dutch forces fought against Belgian separatists. A contemporary account said, "They screamed forwards with God and orange!; when they spotted the enemy they fought in a street and managed to drive the Belgians out the Dutch stood like walls, and fought like lions."
