= Kortessem =

- Municipality
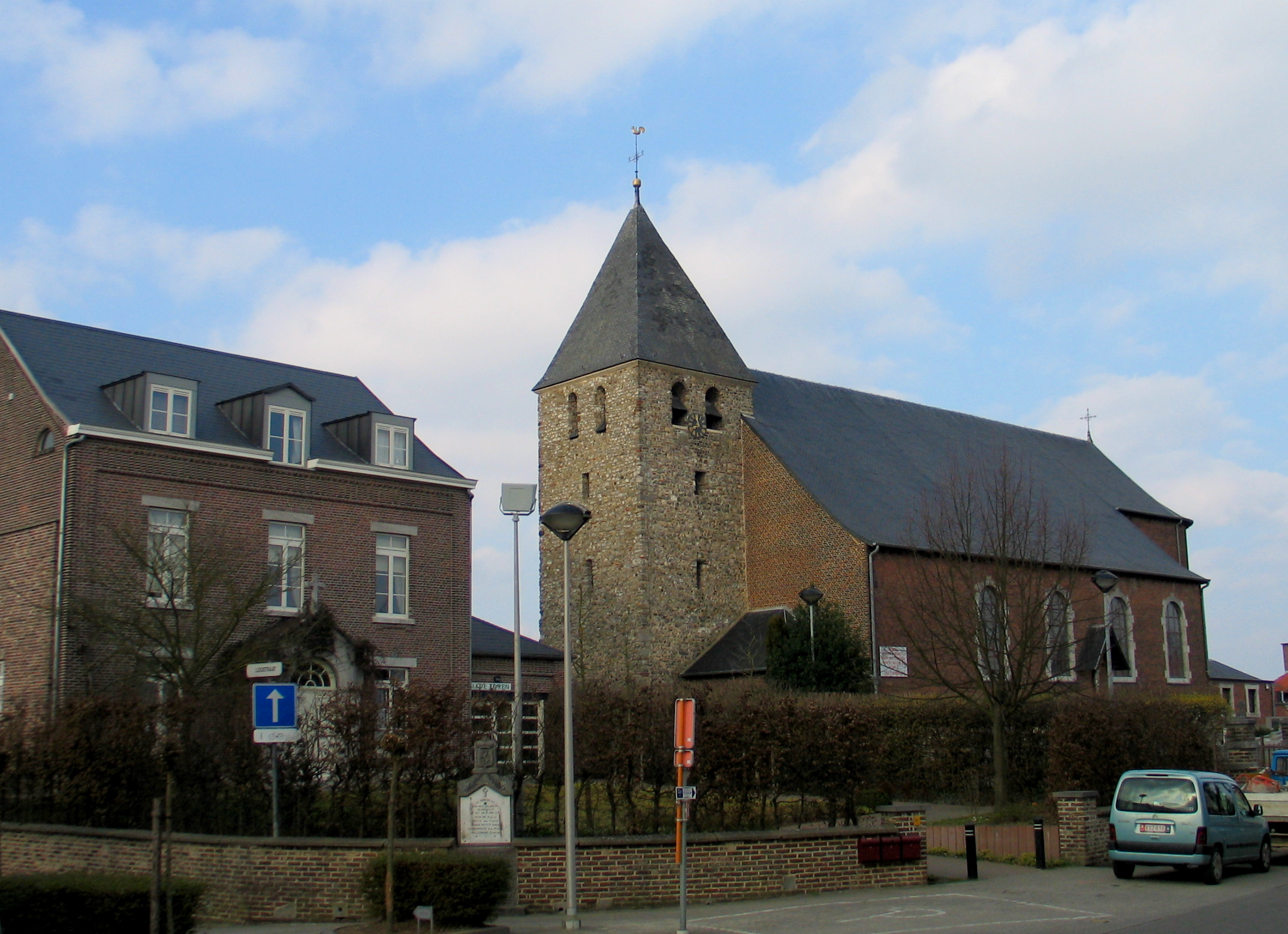

- Flag Coat of arms

- Location of Kortessem in Limburg
- Interactive map of Kortessem
- Location in Belgium
- Coordinates: 50°52′N 05°23′E
- Country: Belgium
- Community: Flemish Community
- Region: Flemish Region
- Province: Limburg
- Arrondissement: Tongeren

Government
  - Mayor: Tom Thijsen (CD&V)
  - Governing parties: CD&V, N-VA

Population (2018-01-01)
  - Total: 8,446
- Postal codes: 3720-3724
- NIS code: 73040
- Area codes: 011
- Website: www.kortessem.be

Kortessem (Dutch pronunciation: [ˈkɔrtəsɛm]; Limburgish: Kotsoeve) is a former municipality located in the Belgian province of Limburg near Hasselt. On January 1, 2006, Kortessem had a total population of 8,074. The total area is 33.90 km^{2} which gives a population density of 238 inhabitants per km^{2}.

The former municipality consisted of the following sub-municipalities: Kortessem, Guigoven, Vliermaal, Vliermaalroot, and Wintershoven.

Up until its destruction by a storm in 2009, Kortessem was the home of the Onzelievehereboom: a 1200-year-old oak.

Since 16 May 2014 Herman Van Rompuy is an honorary citizen.

Kortessem has been part of Hasselt since January 1, 2025.

== Gallery ==
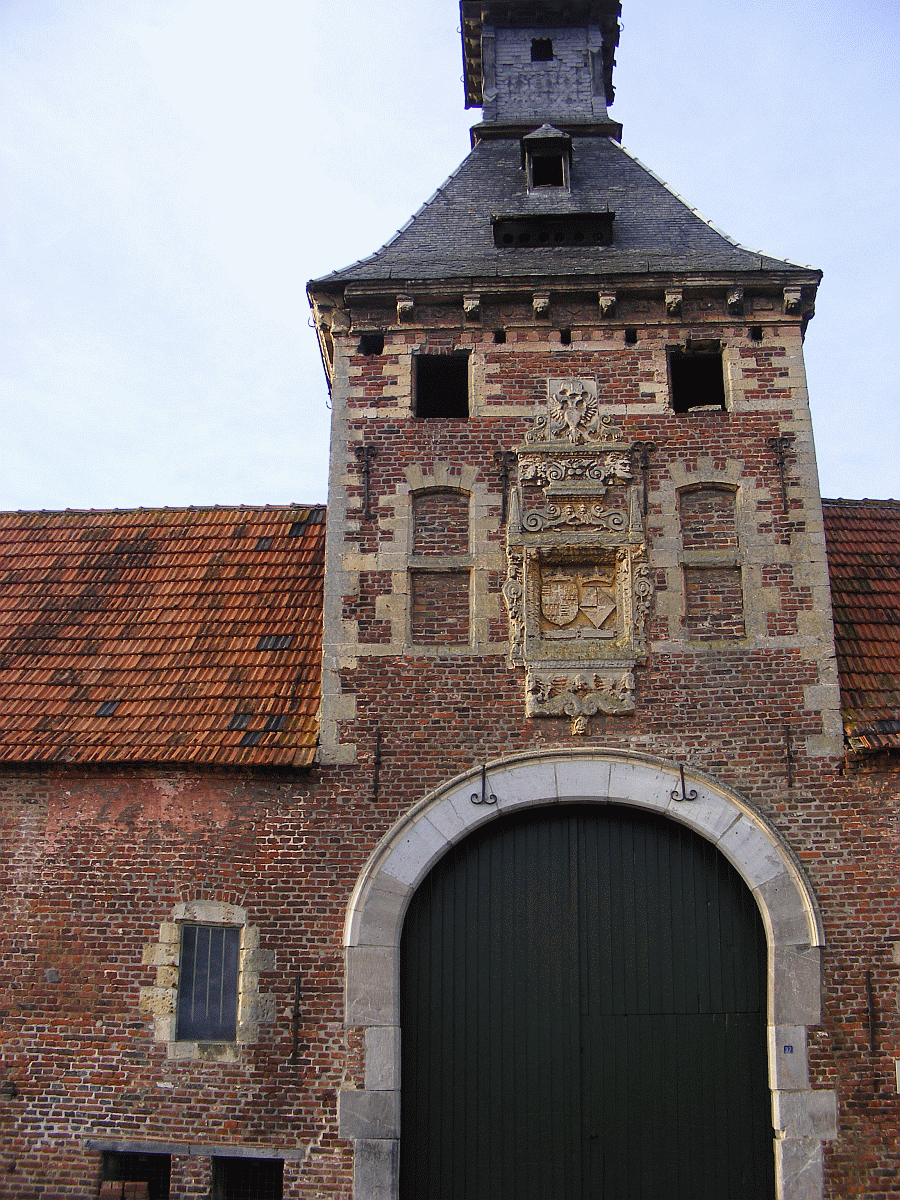
Dessener Castle, former residence of Field Marshal Guillaume de Lamboy, Baron of Cortesheim

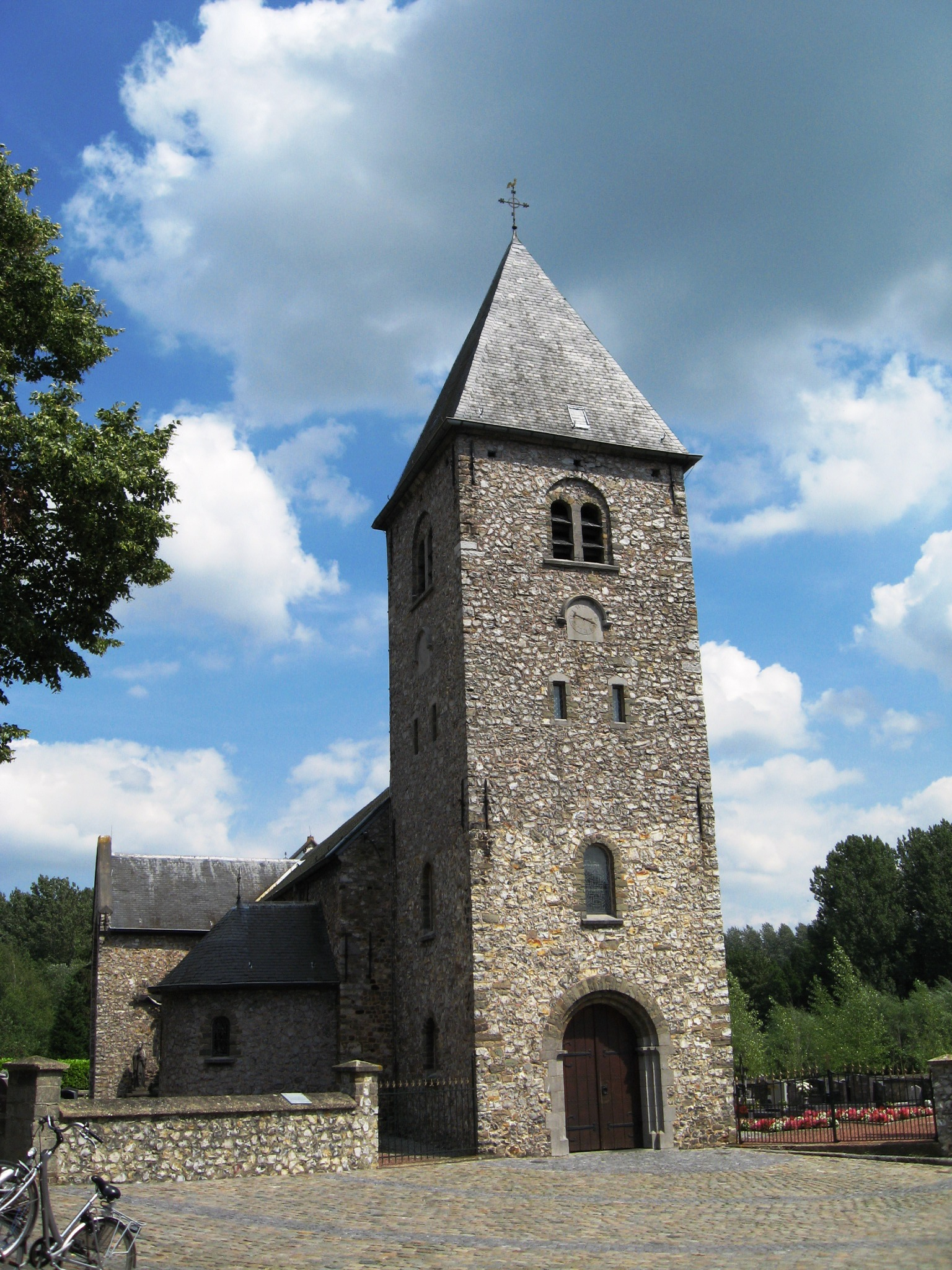
Church of Saint Peter in Chains in Wintershoven, Kortessem

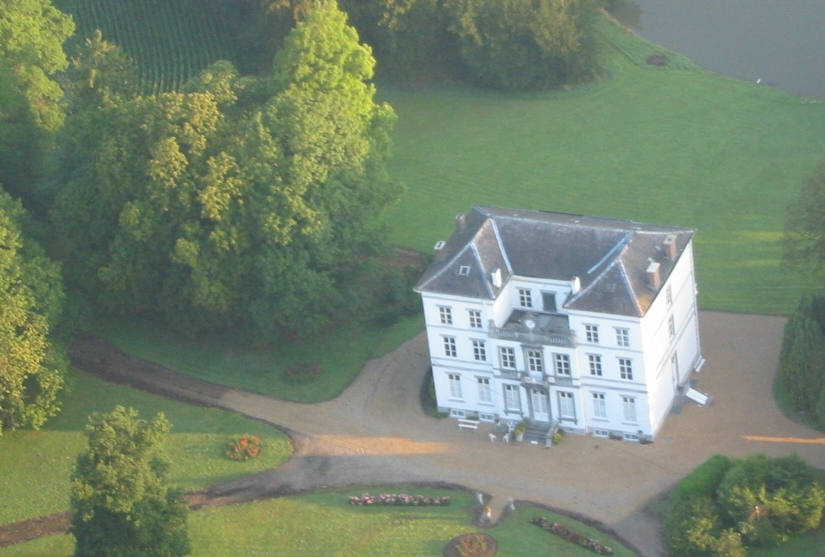
Castle Jongenbos, Vliermaalroot
