= Battle of Leuven (1831) =

1831 battle in the Belgian Revolution

- Part of the Ten Days' Campaign
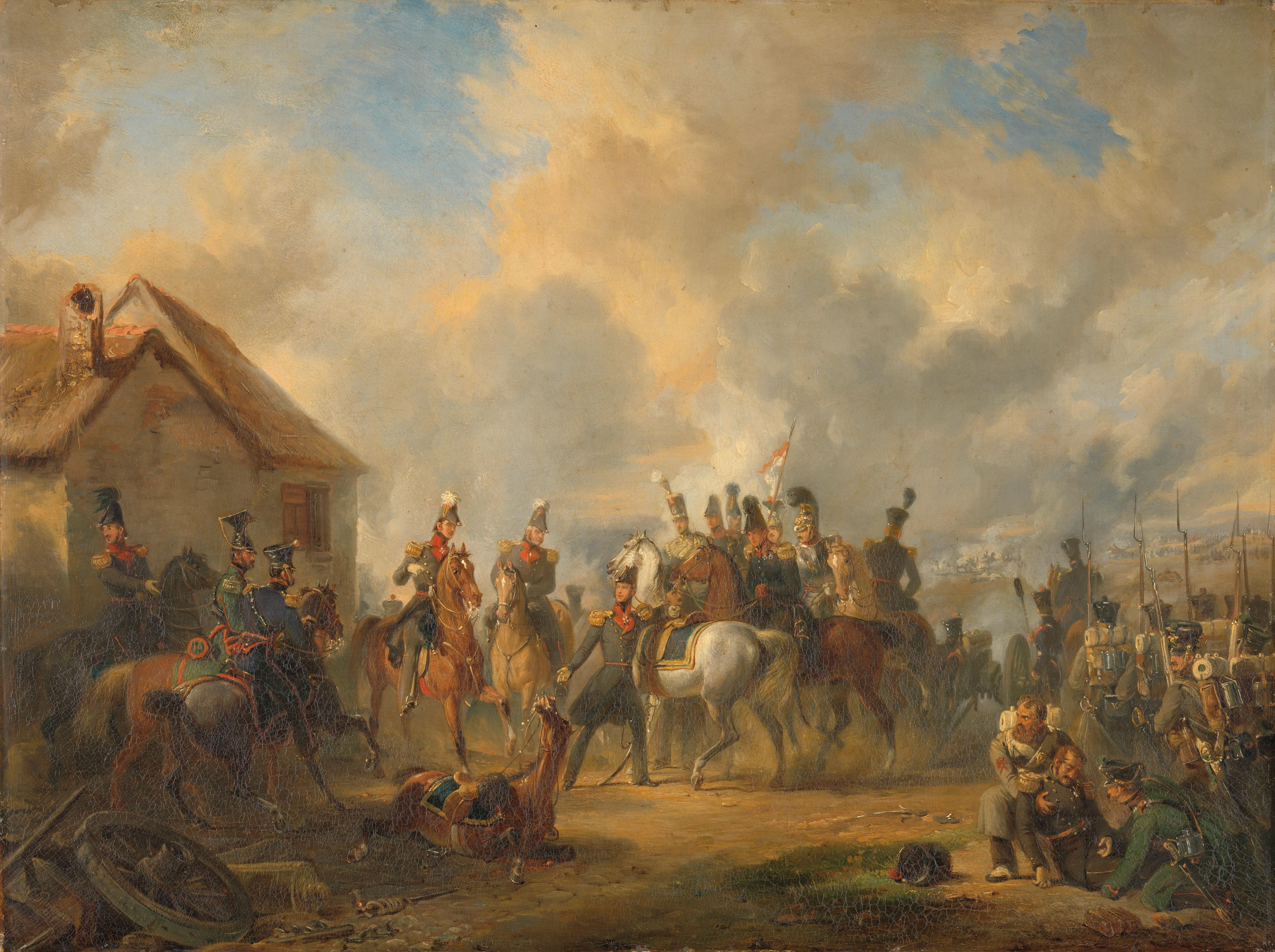
- The Battle of Bautersem by Nicolaas Pieneman, 1833
Date	12–13 August 1831
Location	Leuven and Boutersem area, Belgium
Result	Dutch victory; Occupation of Leuven; Dutch withdrawal to avoid war with France

Belligerents
Netherlands	Belgian rebels France

Commanders and leaders
(Netherlands) Prince William	(Belgium) Leopold I (Belgium) Charles Niellon

The Battle of Leuven or Battle of Boutersem was a battle of the Ten Days' Campaign during the Belgian Revolution. The battle took place on 12 August and officially ended on 13 August 1831. The Dutch army defeated the Belgian rebels, but were forced to withdraw in order to avoid war with France, as a large French army under Maréchal Gérard had crossed the border to support the Belgian rebels. They concluded a truce with the Belgians, allowing them to take the city for a few hours on 13 August.

== The battle ==
On 12 August 1831 Prince William II at the head of the Dutch army reached the outskirts of Leuven, where Leopold I had established his headquarters. A battle broke out in which the Belgians were pushed back over the Dijle and the Dutch took the Ijzerenberg in Herent.

Then, William learned that a French army of 70,000 under Marshal Gérard had crossed the border to aid the Belgians. In order to avoid a war with France, Prince William concluded a truce with the Belgians at Pellenberg. Fighting continued for a short time, but at 16.30 on 13 August the campaign ended.

On 13 August, as agreed in the truce, the Dutch were allowed to symbolically occupy the city under the leadership of princes William and Frederick. The princes walked through the city and drank a beer in a local inn. On 14 August the Dutch pulled back. The last Dutch troops withdrew on 20 August.
