= Ten Days' Campaign =

1831 Belgium-Netherlands conflict

- Part of the aftermath of the Belgian Revolution
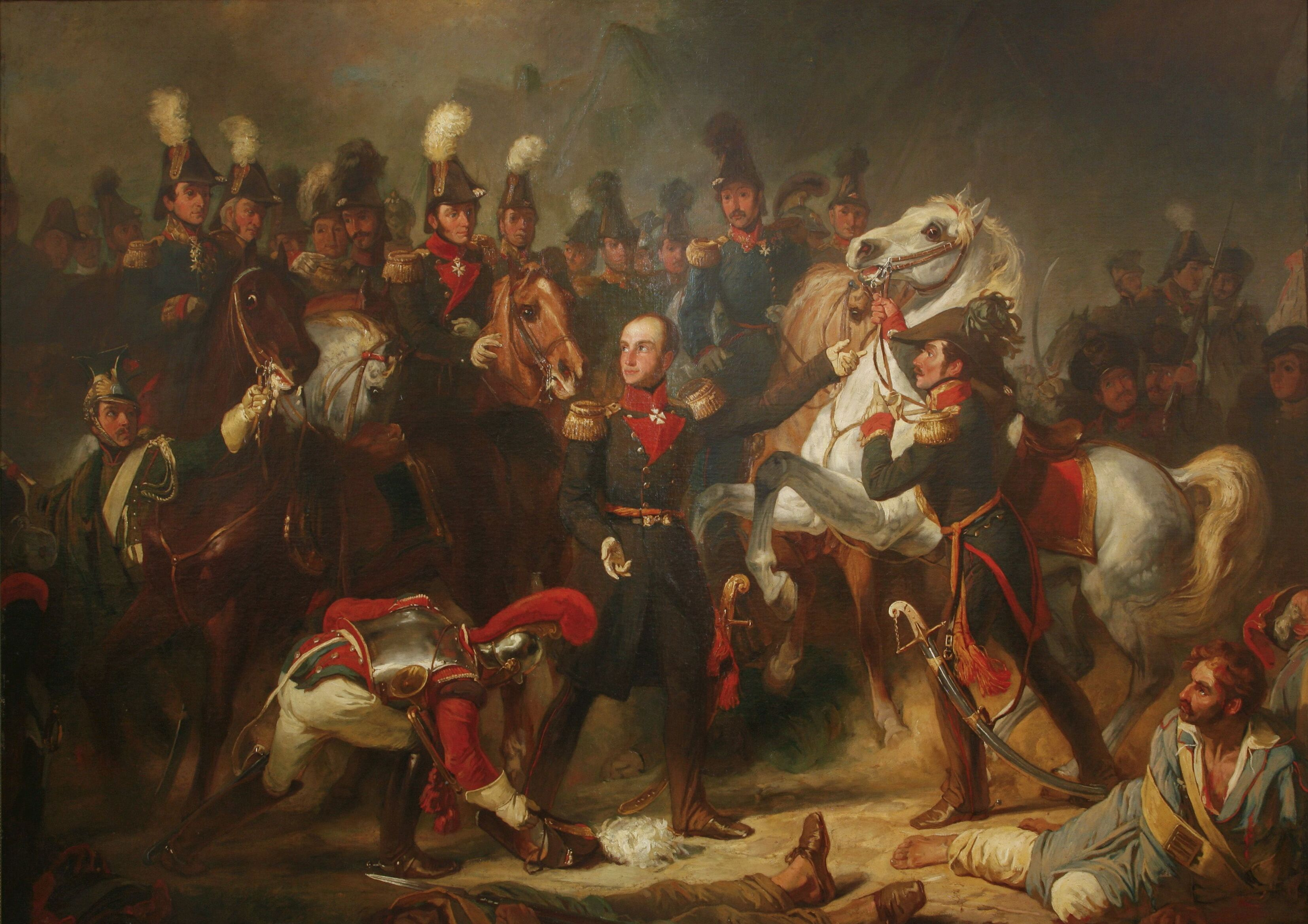
- The replacement of the injured horse of the Prince of Orange at the Battle of Bautersem, 12 August 1831
Date	2–12 August 1831
Location	Belgium and Dutch Limburg
Result	Inconclusive
Territorial changes	Limburg and Luxembourg return to the Netherlands

Belligerents
Belgium; France	(United Kingdom of the Netherlands) United Netherlands

Commanders and leaders
(Belgium) King Leopold I; (Belgium) Amédée de Failly; (Belgium) Charles Niellon; (Belgium) Pierre-Jean De Clippele; (France) Étienne Gérard	(United Kingdom of the Netherlands) King William I; (United Kingdom of the Netherlands) William, Prince of Orange

Strength
Belgium: 24,000 men France: 70,000 men	36,000–50,000 men (Note: Henri Pirenne gives an estimate of 50,000 men for the Dutch army. Jeremy Black provides a lower estimate of 36,000 men and 72 cannon.)

Casualties and losses
925 dead	661 dead

The Ten Days' Campaign (Dutch: Tiendaagse veldtocht, French: campagne des Dix-Jours) was a failed military expedition by the United Kingdom of the Netherlands against the secessionist Kingdom of Belgium between 2 and 12 August 1831. The campaign was an attempt by the Dutch King William I to halt the course of the Belgian Revolution which had broken out in August 1830.

The Dutch army invaded Belgium on 2 August 1831 and defeated Belgian forces in several battles over the course of the next few days, advancing deep into Belgian territory. On 8 August, the Belgian government appealed to France for military support. The French agreed to send reinforcements to assist the Belgians under Marshal Étienne Gérard. Rather than fight the French, the Dutch withdrew from Belgium without achieving their objectives. In November 1832, the French besieged and captured Antwerp, the last Dutch stronghold in Belgium, effectively ending the military confrontation between the Dutch and Belgians.

== Background ==
In the aftermath of the Napoleonic Wars, the 1815 Congress of Vienna merged the former Austrian Netherlands and Liège, as well as some smaller polities in modern-day Belgium and Luxembourg, with the Dutch Republic to create the United Kingdom of the Netherlands. After 15 years of perceived misrule and growing opposition, the southern provinces of the Kingdom rebelled in August 1830, beginning the Belgian Revolution. Dutch forces were expelled from most of the territory of modern-day Belgium and Dutch Limburg by November 1830 when a cease-fire was agreed.

In the aftermath of the revolution, large numbers of Belgian soldiers deserted from the Dutch army. Most of the army's officers were Dutch but the bulk of the conscripted recruits came from the Belgian south. Much of the Dutch army's strength was also deployed overseas in the Dutch colonial empire, notably in the East Indies as part of the Java War. Believing that the Belgians could be pacified and encouraged to abandon their insurrection through negotiation, the Dutch king William I attempted to prevent confrontations with his troops which could radicalise the insurgents. Consequently, there were relatively few armed confrontations between Belgian rebels and the Dutch army during the revolution itself. However, the leaders of the Belgian revolution had grown overconfident because of their early success and had not taken steps to build up a military force of their own.

King William I viewed the failure to suppress the Belgian revolt as a humiliation and sought an opportunity to retaliate. Even if reunification should prove impossible, no armistice between the Dutch and Belgians had been signed and William believed that a successful military campaign against the Belgians would improve his position in future diplomatic negotiations. Therefore, when William learned that the revolutionary National Congress had asked Leopold of Saxe-Coburg to become King of the Belgians, he began to prepare his invasion.

In 1831, a 50,000-strong Dutch force was built up near the Belgian border in North Brabant, notionally to protect the frontier. It was commanded by the Prince of Orange (the future king William II). The Belgian army across the border numbered just 24,000, including both regular soldiers and the poorly trained and equipped militia units of the Garde Civique. The Belgian force was split into two armies, known as the Army of the Meuse and the Army of the Scheldt, under the nominal command of King Leopold I and his Minister of War Amédée de Failly. The Army of the Meuse was based in Limburg while the Army of the Scheldt surrounded the still Dutch-held citadel of Antwerp, however the distance between the two forces was too great and each was effectively cut off.

== The military campaign ==
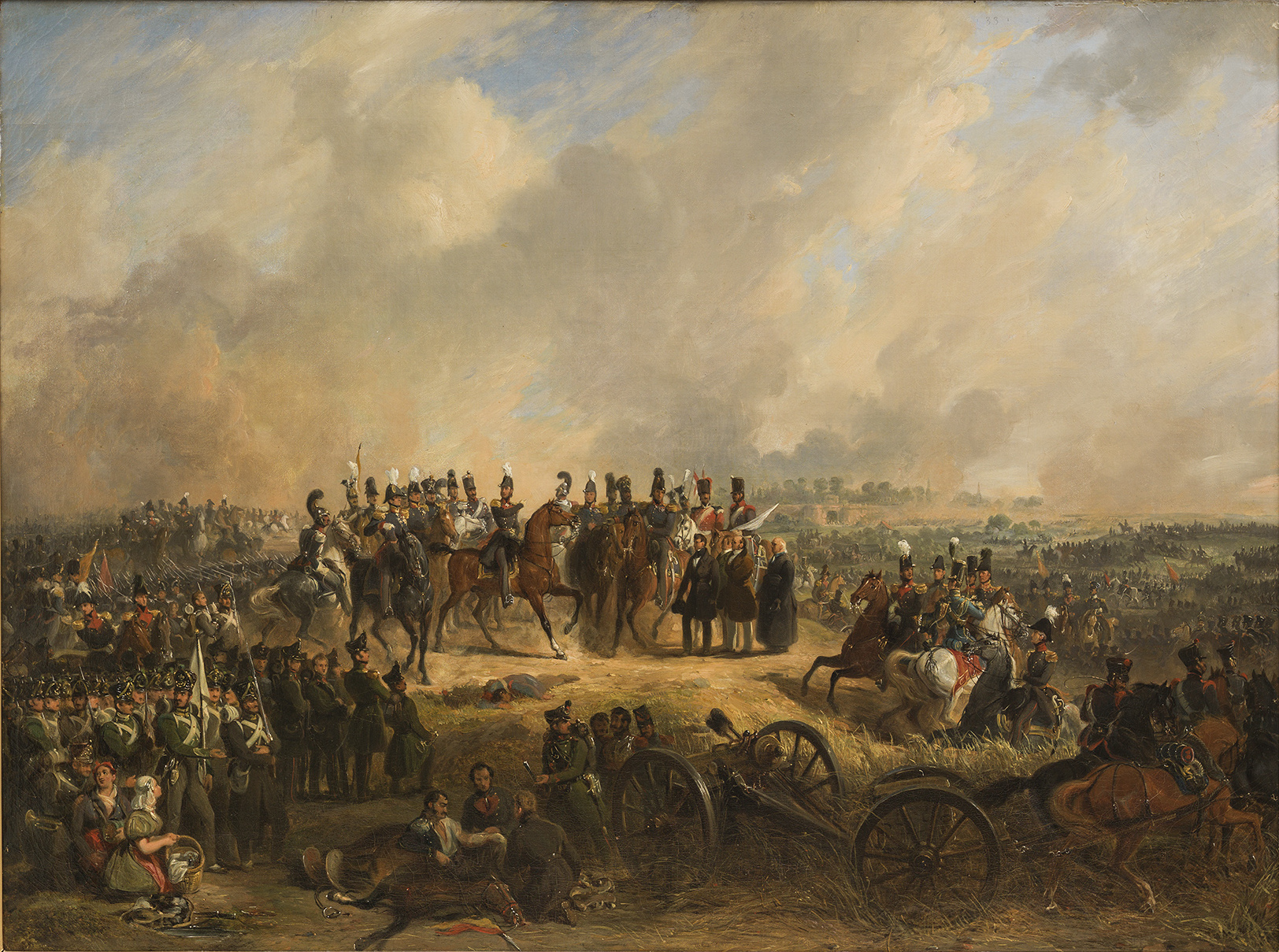
Jan Willem Pieneman's depiction of the fall of Hasselt to Dutch forces on 8 August 1831

On the morning of 2 August 1831, just days after Leopold's coronation, the Dutch crossed the border near Poppel. Belgian scouts noticed the advance, and a number of roads were blocked with felled trees. The first skirmishes took place around Nieuwenkerk. The Dutch supreme commander, the Prince of Orange, arrived in the afternoon to support his troops and, at the same time, Zondereigen was taken by the Dutch, with some 400 Belgians repulsed. Near Ravels, the Belgian army was rapidly driven into the surrounding forests by the Dutch and subsequently into a swamp. The Belgians later retreated to Turnhout, allowing the Dutch to set up camp. The sound of the Dutch artillery alarmed the population of Turnhout, who fled en masse towards Antwerp. The next day a Dutch force of about 11,000 prepared to take Turnhout, while another Dutch corps made a diversion towards Antwerp (in reality they would attack Turnhout from another direction). In the following battle, the Dutch smashed the Belgian forces, whose morale broke down early in the battle when the Belgian banner was torn apart by Dutch artillery and a soldier lost a leg to a cannonball. The Belgians were unable to hold their ground and fled.

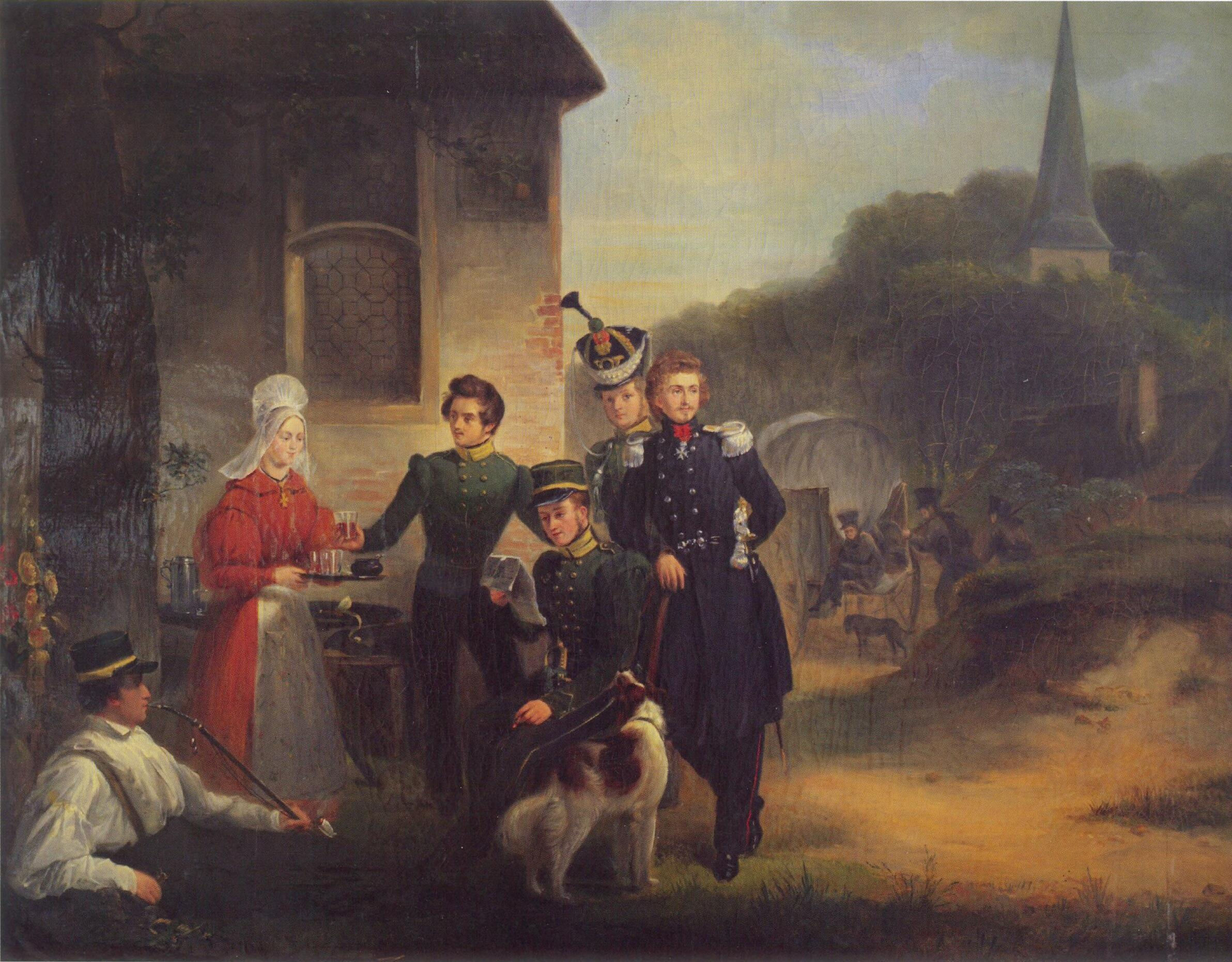
Johanna Aleida Budde's depiction of Jagers during the Ten days' campaign (c. 1835)

Map of the Dutch march during the ten days' campaign

On 4 August, the Dutch took the city of Antwerp. The flag of Brabant was taken down and the Dutch flag was hoisted. The Prince of Orange demanded that the flag be taken down again, because it symbolised occupation rather than a restoration of Dutch power. At the same time the Dutch armies split up and moved further into Belgium, defeating numerous militias and two regular Belgian armies with ease, as in the Battle of Houthalen. The division led by Prince Bernhard of Saxe-Weimar moved upon Geel and Diest, and the Third division moved into Limburg. On 8 August, the Dutch defeated the Belgian Army of the Meuse near Hasselt. On 11 August, the advance guard of the Belgian Army of the Scheldt was defeated near Boutersem. The next day the Dutch army attacked and defeated the Belgians near Leuven.

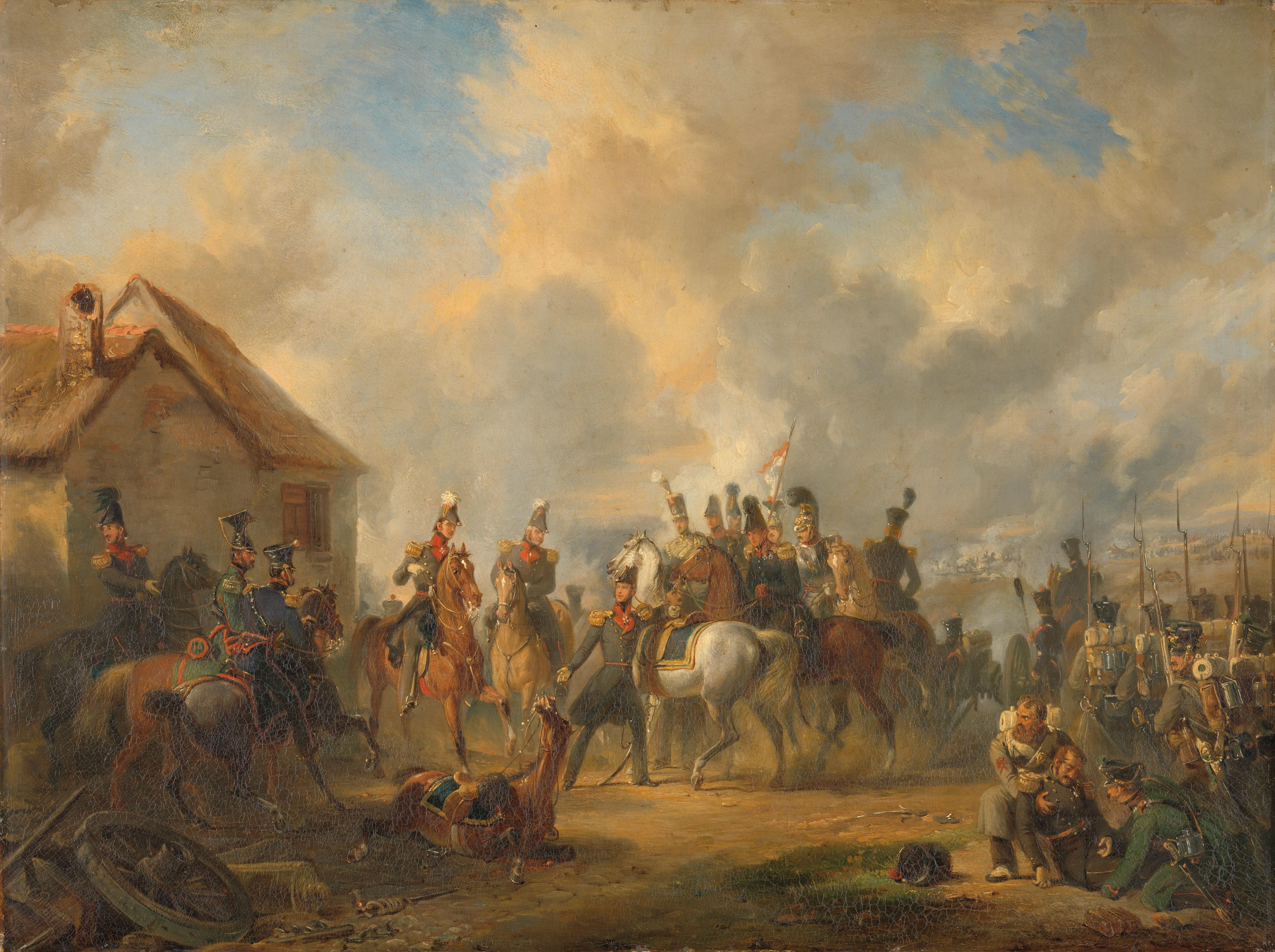
The Battle of Bautersem by Nicolaas Pieneman, 1833

For the Belgians all seemed lost. Fearing the total disintegration of the army, Leopold called for international support on 8 August. Sylvain Van de Weyer was sent to attempt to solicit support from Great Britain while François Lehon was sent to France. Although the British government was reluctant to send troops to support Belgium, the French immediately dispatched a force without informing the other Great Powers. The movement of French troops into Belgium particularly worried the British, who felt that it could represent a threat to Europe's balance of power. The French army under Marshal Étienne Gérard crossed the border the next day. The Dutch had taken a risk by invading Belgium without the support of their allies: Russia had wanted to assist but was having trouble suppressing the Polish revolution, and Prussia would not risk sending troops without Russia being able to secure its western borders; now they faced a possible war with the French. After an intervention by the British diplomat Robert Adair, the Dutch halted their advance and a ceasefire was signed on 12 August. The last Dutch troops returned to the Netherlands around 20 August, whilst only Antwerp remained occupied.

== Aftermath ==
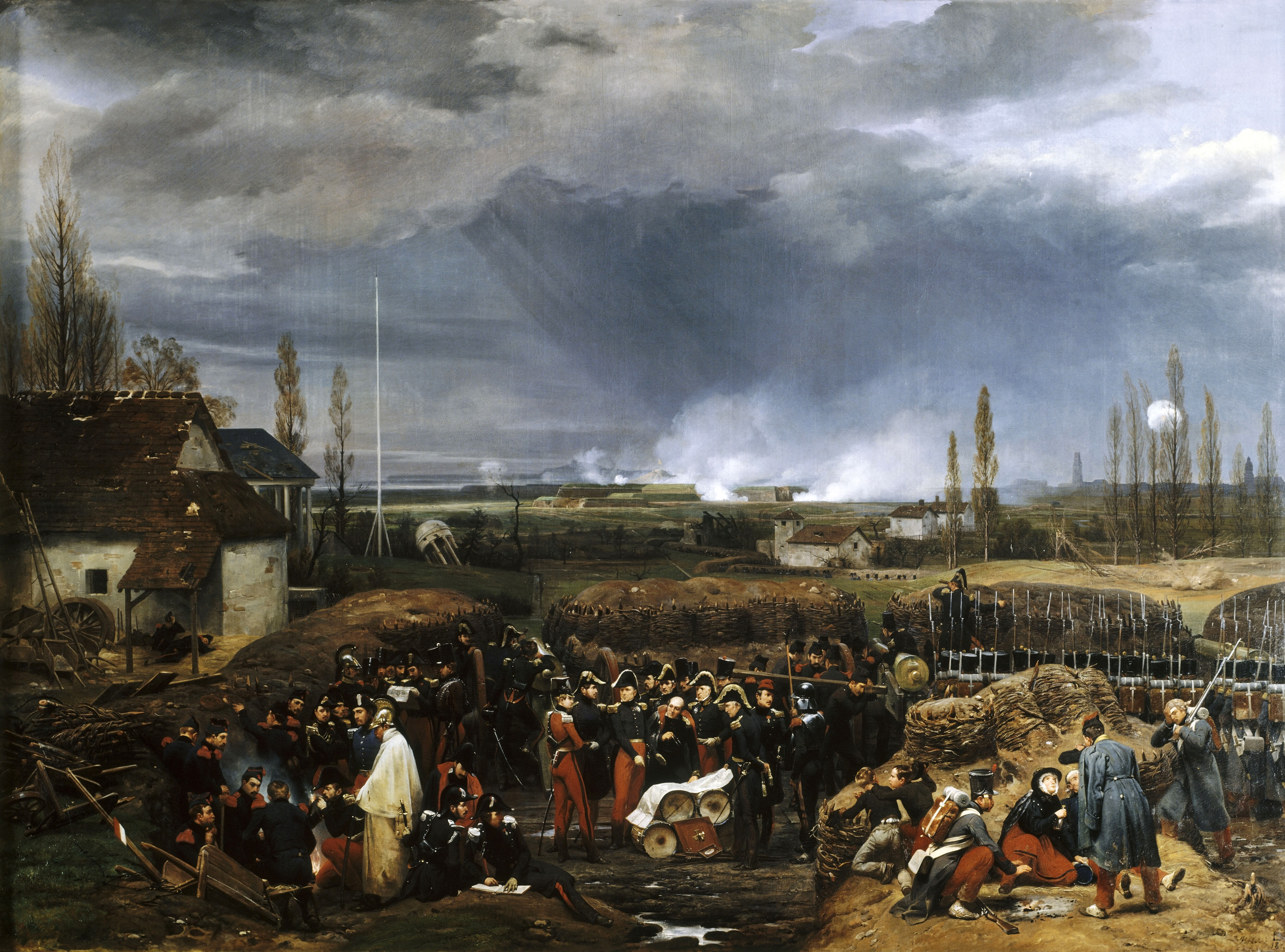
Horace Vernet's Siege of the Citadel of Antwerp, 22 December 1832 (1840) depicts the French siegeworks during the 1832 siege.

Although the Dutch population, especially the Protestants, rejoiced over the victorious campaign against the "Belgian rebels", King William reluctantly accepted that his dream of a United Netherlands was lost. The campaign did, however, demonstrate the vulnerability of the Belgian position. As a result, the London Conference responsible for drafting an international agreement recognising Belgian independence imposed larger concessions on the Belgians. The resulting Treaty of XXIV Articles ceded territory occupied by the Belgians, including parts of Limburg and the Grand Duchy of Luxembourg, to the Netherlands and imposed various economic restraints on Belgium. William nonetheless refused to sign and the Conference agreed to favour the Belgians while the Dutch refused.

The King of the Netherlands, refusing to abandon the citadel at Antwerp, ordered the Dutch General David Hendrik Chassé to hold it at all costs. From the citadel, Chassé bombarded the city of Antwerp, setting fire to hundreds of homes and causing many casualties among the civilian population. The result was a second intervention by the Northern Army of Marshal Gérard, who returned to Belgium on 15 November 1832, to besiege the citadel of Antwerp. This resulted in the participation of Belgian volunteers, who until then had been kept out of combat. The French commander had wanted to conduct the siege alone, fearing the volunteers would spread the idea of revolution beyond the borders of Belgium.

In the years after the ten days' campaign, the Belgian army improved its organisation, training, and equipment. They fought mainly along the Scheldt. By preventing the Dutch from blowing up the levees and attacking the Dutch fleet, which was providing assistance to Antwerp, Belgium thwarted attempts to rescue the city. It fell after 24 days under the direction of the French general of Engineers, General François Haxo. General Chassé surrendered on 23 December. The Dutch finally signed the Treaty of XXIV Articles in 1839, effectively recognising Belgium's de facto independence. It can therefore be indirectly argued that Dutch Limburg owes its status as a Dutch area to the Ten Days Campaign. Belgium also received 16/31 share of the national debt and the Belgian claims on Zeelandic Flanders lapsed.

== Analysis ==
In his Histoire de Belgique series, the Belgian historian Henri Pirenne argued that, despite acts of individual bravery, "the weakness of the resistance was such that the advance of the victors almost resembled a military parade." Nevertheless, Pirenne considered that campaign illustrated the strengths of the new country, pointing out that, despite visible weakness of the Belgian state, the campaign was not followed by a resurgence of Orangism or demands to unify with France.
