= Van der Hulst =

Van der Hulst is a Dutch surname. Notable people with the surname include:

- Abraham van der Hulst (1619–1666), Dutch admiral
- Pieter Teyler van der Hulst (1702–1778), Dutch Mennonite merchant
- Pieter van der Hulst (I) (1570-1627/8), Flemish painter
- Pieter van der Hulst (II) (fl 1623–1637), Flemish painter
- Pieter van der Hulst (III) (?-1648), Flemish painter
- Pieter van der Hulst (IV) (1651–1727), Dutch painter
- Jan Baptist van der Hulst (1790–1862), Flemish painter

== See also ==
- Van de Hulst (disambiguation)
