= Henrietta d'Oultremont =

Morganatic wife of William I of the Netherlands (1792–1864)

Henriëtte
- Countess of Nassau
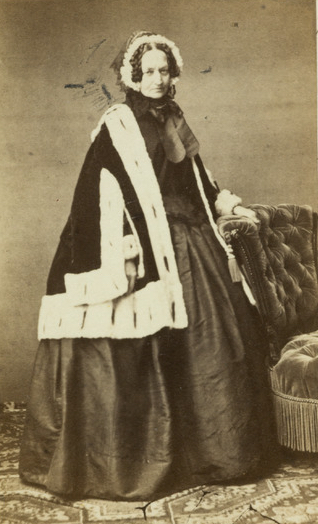
- Henriëtte d'Oultremont de Wégimont
- Born: 28 February 1792; Maastricht
- Died: 26 October 1864 (aged 72); Rahe Castle in Aachen
- Buried: chapel of Wégimont Castle in Soumagne
- Noble family: d'Oultremont de Wégimont
- Spouse: William I of the Netherlands (m. 1841; died 1843)
- Father: Count Ferdinand d'Oultremont de Wégimont
- Mother: Johanna Susanna Hartsinck

Countess Henriëtte Adriana Maria Ludovica Flora d'Oultremont de Wégimont (28 February 1792 in Maastricht–26 October 1864 at Rahe Castle in Aachen) was a Belgian noblewoman and the second, morganatic wife of the first Dutch king, William I. Being the morganatic wife of the King, she was never made Queen Consort.

== Life ==
Coat of Arms of Henriette's family: Counts d'Oultremont de Wégimont

Henriëtte d'Oultremont was one of five children of Count Ferdinand d'Oultremont de Wégimont (1760-1799) from Liège and his wife, Johanna Susanna Hartsinck (1759-1830), daughter of Admiral Andries Hartsinck (1720-1788) and Johanna Cornelia de Bas (1721-1787). She was related to Count Charles Jean "John" d'Oultremont (1848-1917). Around 1840, King William found himself in discord with much of the Dutch population due to his refusal to implement demanded reforms. This discord was enhanced when the king, head of the strictly Protestant and royal House of Orange-Nassau, announced his intention to marry the Catholic Countess, who had been a lady-in-waiting to his first wife, the late Queen Wilhelmine.

The resistance was so great—Henriëtte was Catholic and a native of Belgium, which had seceded from the Netherlands—that William decided to abdicate in favour of his son William II on 7 October 1840. After abdication, he styled himself King William Frederick, Count of Nassau. He married Henriëtte on 17 February 1841; he was 71 years old at the time, she was 47, and the couple would have no children. She had received the Dutch title, Countess of Nassau on 7 February 1841, by which she was known during the couple's subsequent retirement in Berlin.

William I died two years later, in 1843. Because of her devoted care for her elderly husband, the Dutch royal family awarded her an allowance and a castle near Aachen, where she died in 1864.

Henriëtte was not buried below the New Church in Delft with the Dutch kings and their queens; she was instead buried in the family vault in the chapel in the park surrounding Wégimont castle in Soumagne, near Liège in Belgium.

In the Netherlands, she was nicknamed Jetje Dondermond ("Henriëtta Thundermouth").
