= Pieter van der Hulst =

Pieter van der Hulst may refer to:

- Pieter van der Hulst (I) (1570-1627/8), Flemish painter
- Pieter van der Hulst (II) (fl 1623-1637), Flemish painter
- Pieter van der Hulst (III) (?-1648), Flemish painter
- Pieter van der Hulst (IV) (1651-1727), Dutch painter
