= Jan Baptist van der Hulst =

Flemish painter (1790–1862)

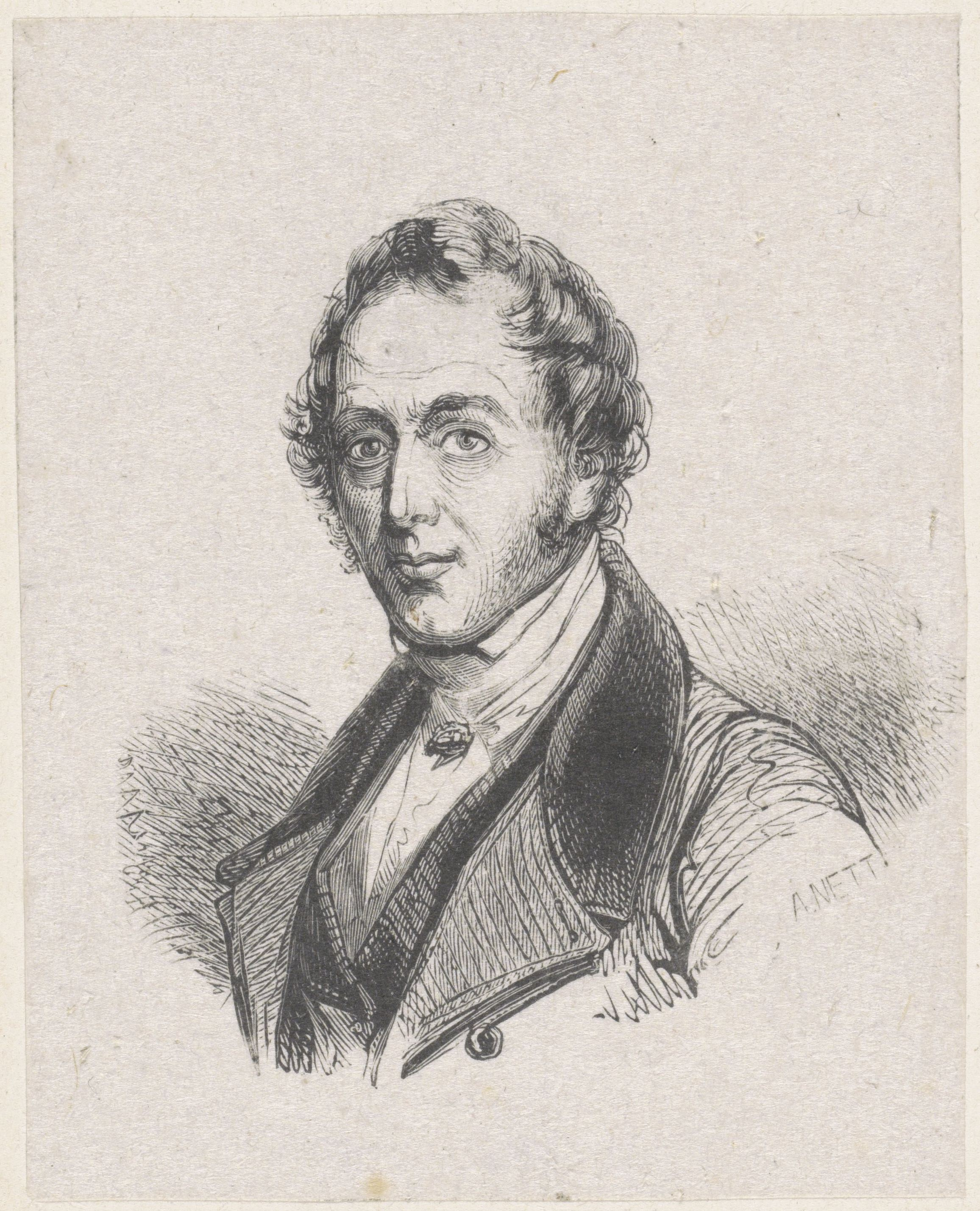
- Self-portrait, 1840–1842
- Born: 2 March 1790; Leuven, Belgium
- Died: 16 April 1862 (aged 72); Brussels, Belgium
- Occupation: Painter

Jan Baptist van der Hulst (2 March 1790 – 16 May 1862) was a Flemish painter and lithographer. He painted numerous members of the royal family of the Netherlands, and was known for his work in history painting as well.

== Selected works ==
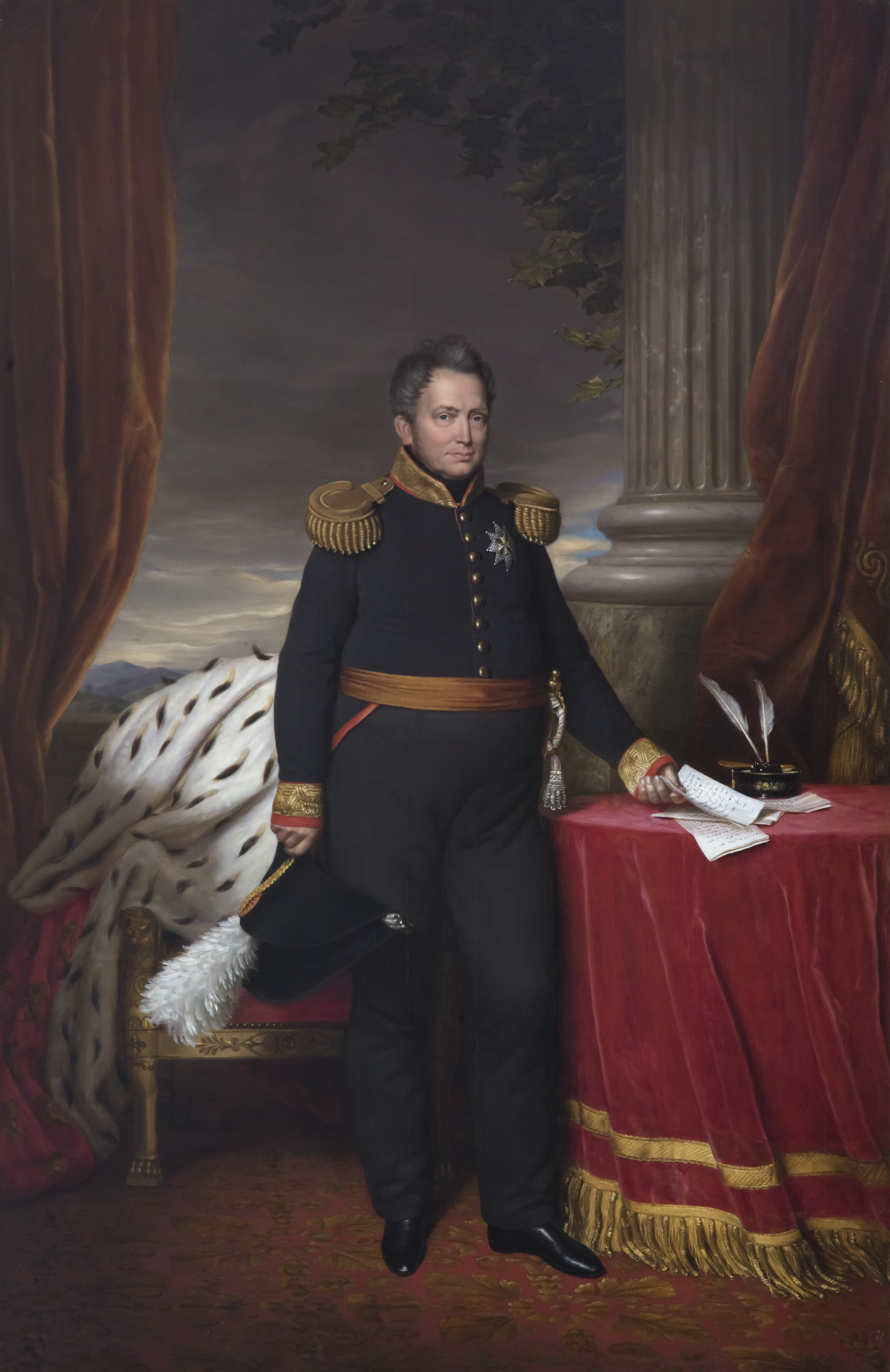
William I, 1830

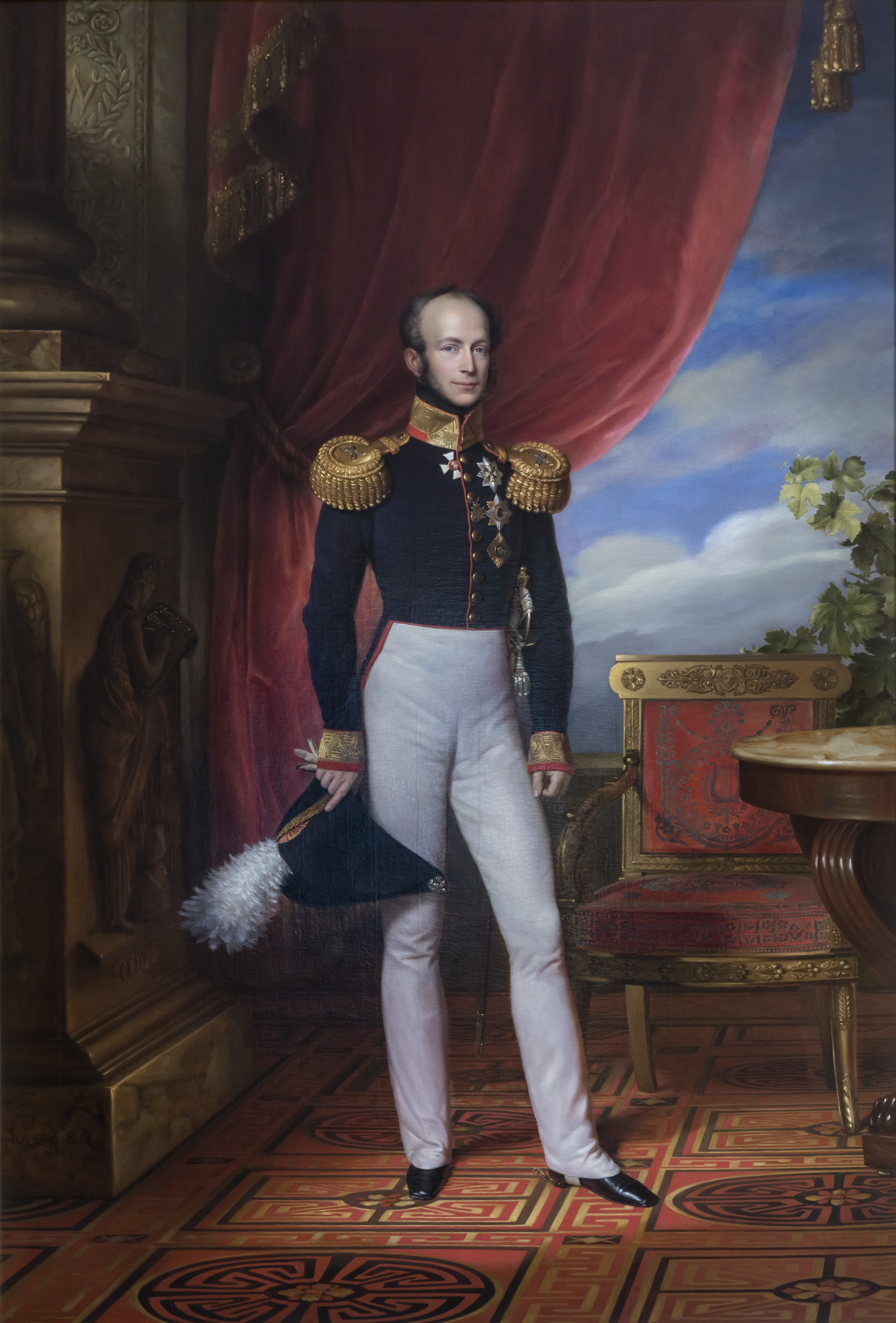
William II, 1833

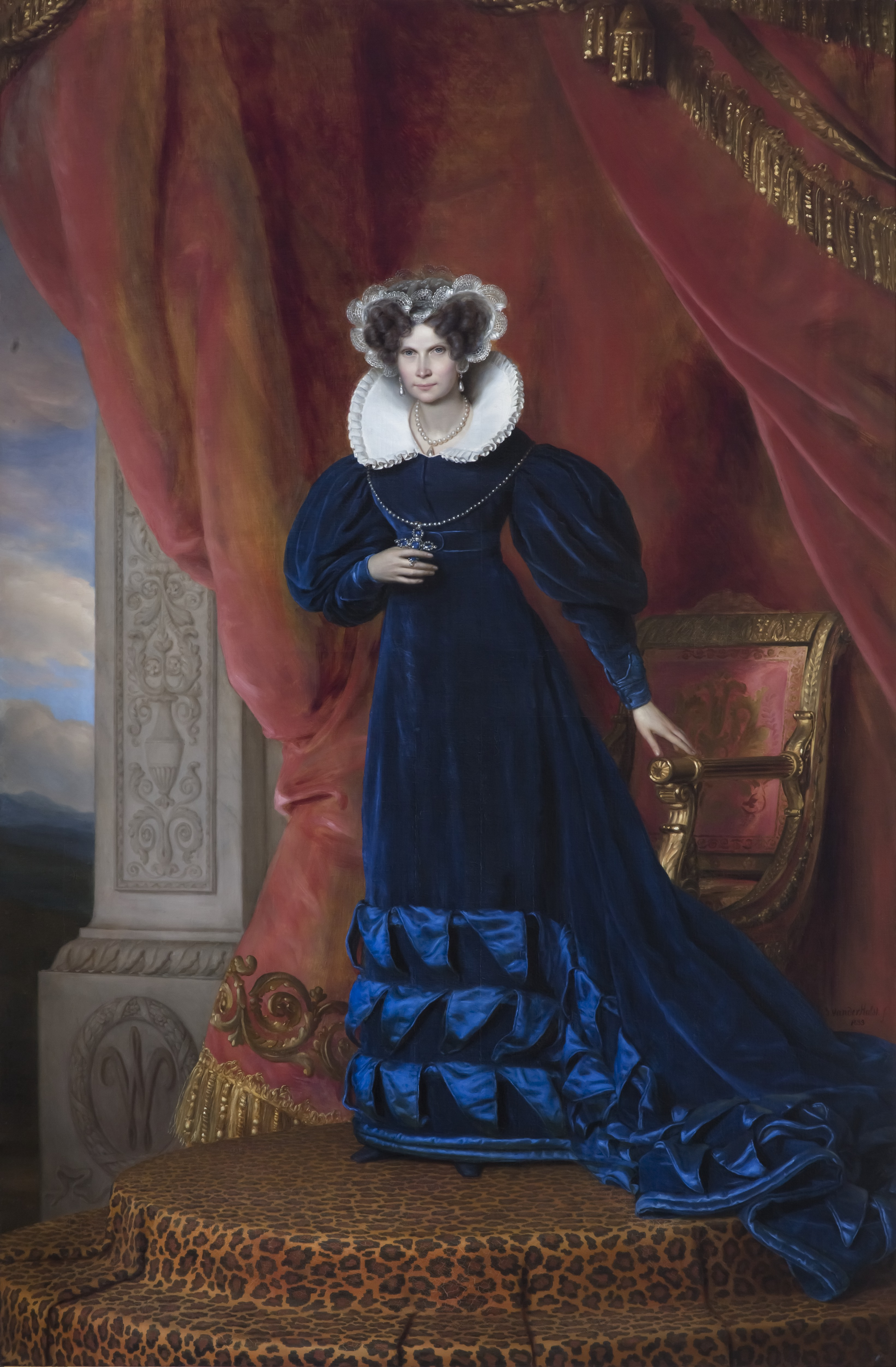
Wilhelmine of Prussia, 1833

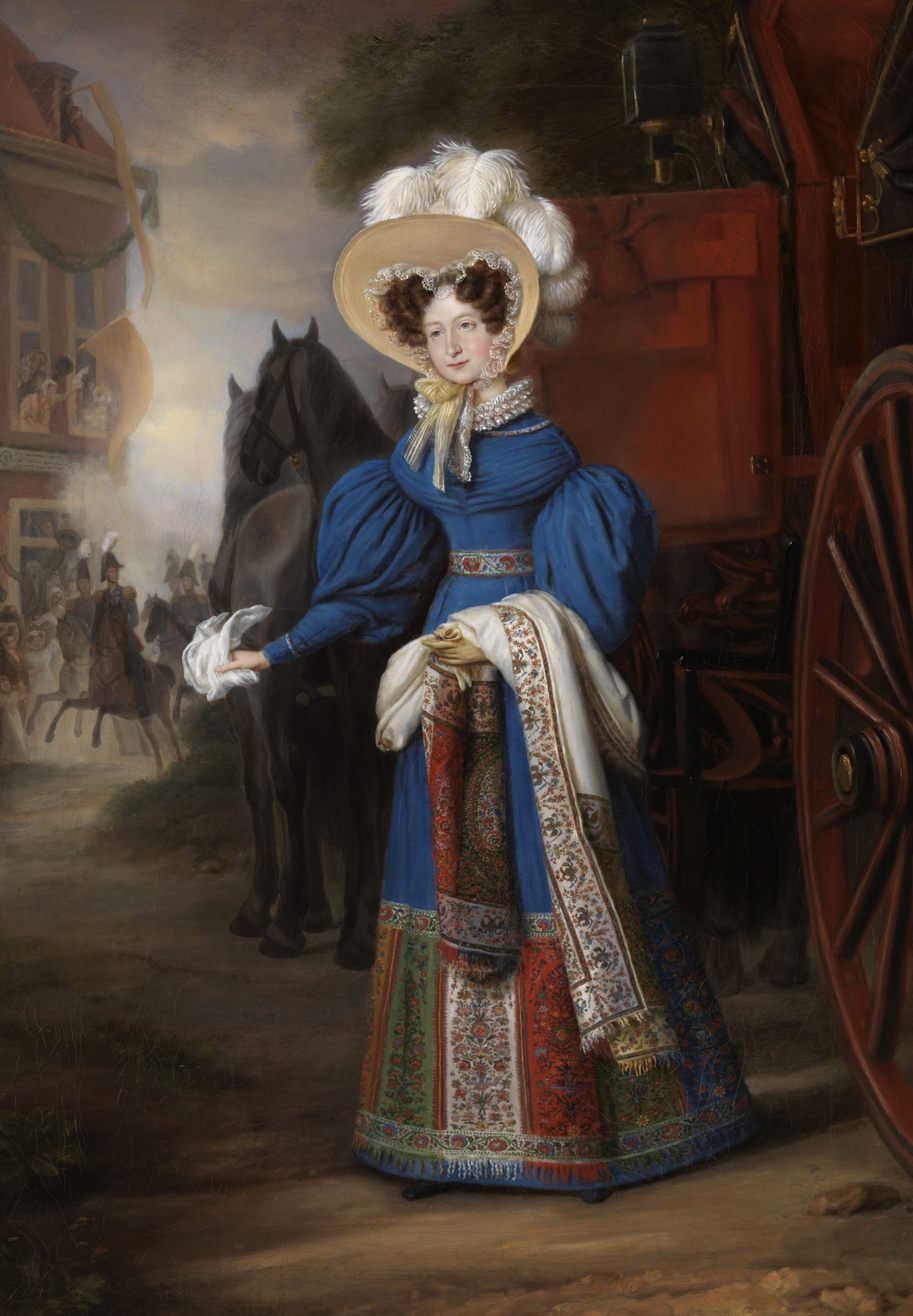
Anna Pavlovna, 1837

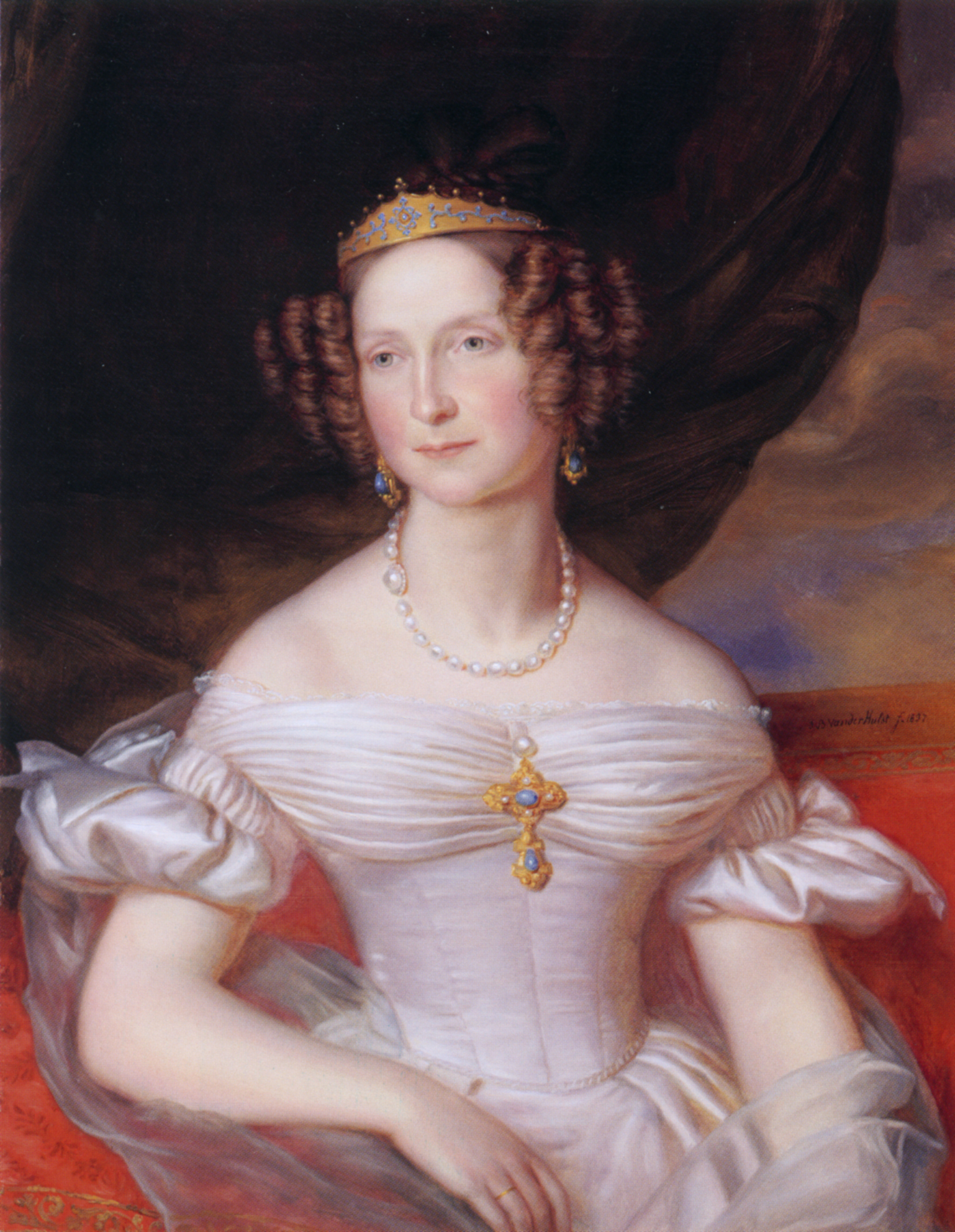
Anna Pavlovna of Russia by van der Hulst

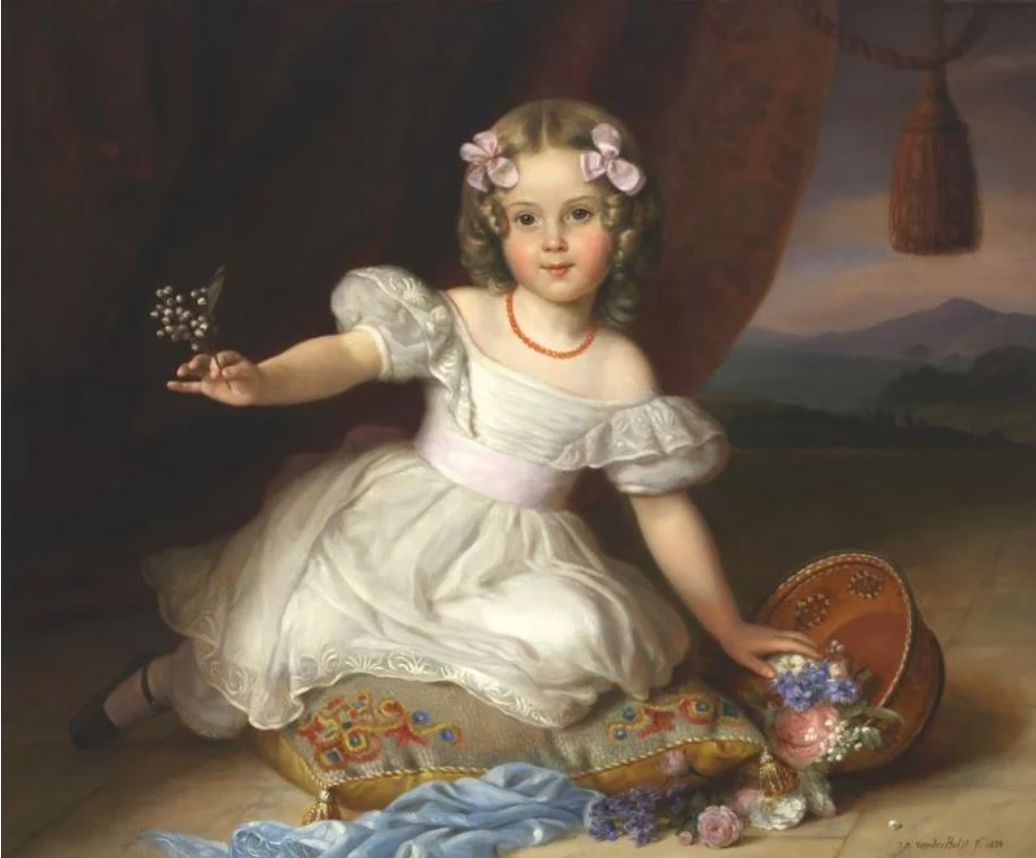
Alexine Tinne, four years old, 1839
