= Princess Pauline of Orange-Nassau =

Dutch princess (1800–1806)

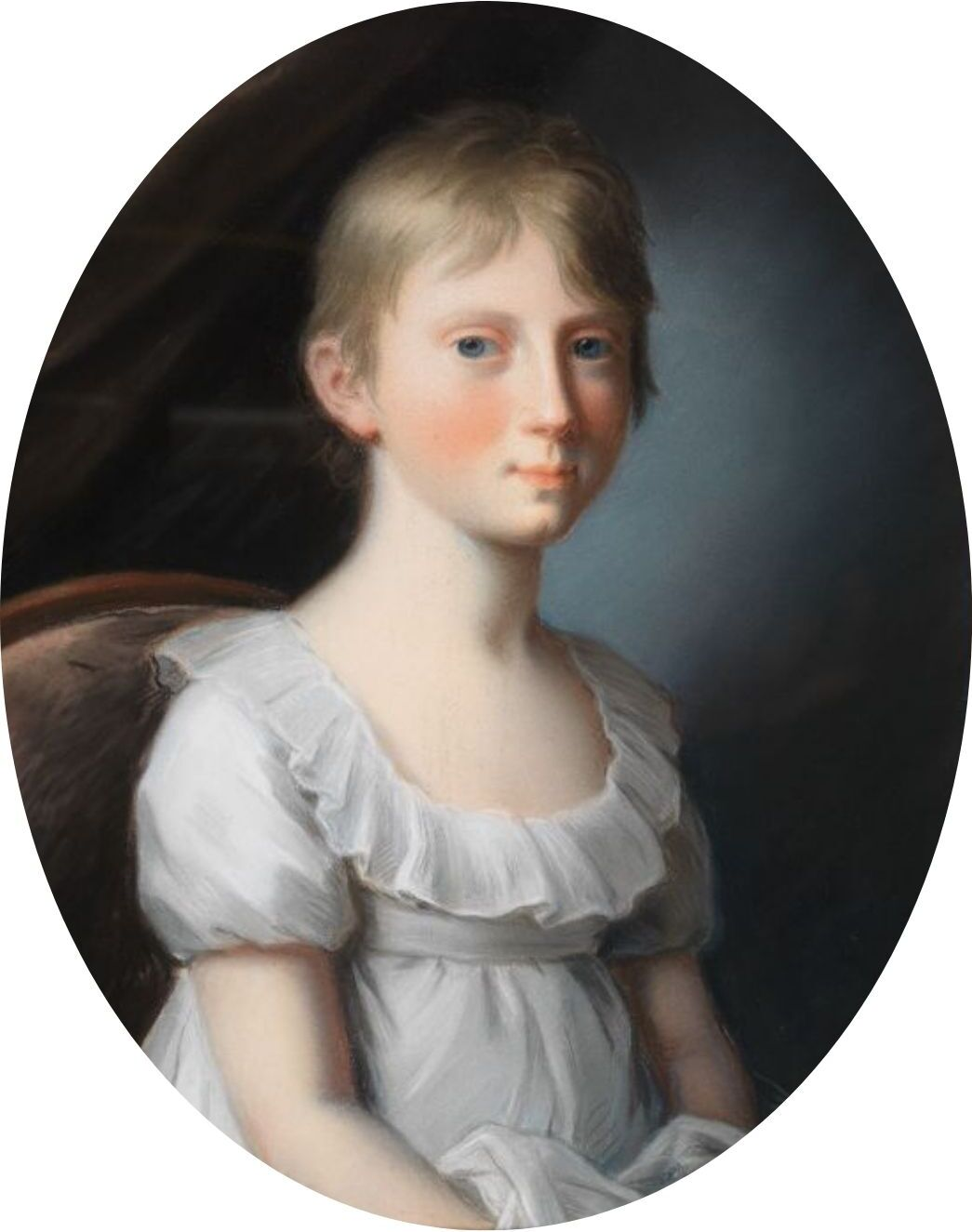
- Pauline in 1806
- Born: 1 March 1800; Berlin
- Died: 22 December 1806 (aged 6); Freienwalde
- Burial: since 1911 Royal Crypt, Nieuwe Kerk, Delft prev. Freienwalde
Names
- Wilhelmina Frederika Louise Pauline Charlotte
- House: Orange-Nassau
- Father: William I of the Netherlands
- Mother: Wilhelmine of Prussia

Princess Wilhelmina Frederika Louise Pauline Charlotte of Orange-Nassau (1 March 1800 – 22 December 1806) was the third child and elder daughter of King William I of the Netherlands and his queen consort, Wilhelmine of Prussia.

== Life ==
Pauline was born in Berlin while her parents were living in exile during the time the Low Countries were occupied by France. She was the third child and first-born daughter of the later King William I of the Netherlands and his wife, Wilhelmine of Prussia. Her two older brothers were the future King William II and Prince Frederick of the Netherlands. Her parents had another, stillborn, child in 1795. Her younger sister, Marianne, was born four years after her death.

In 1803 Pauline and her family moved to the Nassau family estates in Germany. Here she met her paternal grandparents for the first time. They quickly became fond of her, and Pauline's grandfather William V nicknamed her Polly. Particularly her grandfather was very happy to see her, because none of the recent Nassau-Orange rulers had seen a granddaughter in their lifetime. During a ball in celebration of the birthday of Princess Pauline's father, the old obese ex-Prince danced with Pauline in the grand ballroom of the castle. From 1804 the family lived with William V in Berlin, where he had bought a palace on the Unter den Linden (No. 36). The palace is known as the Niederländische Palais (the Netherlands Palace). At the age of five, she and her older brothers began to spend more time with their grandparents in Oranienstein. In August 1806, her parents had another stillborn son.

Berlin was occupied by the French on 27 October 1806 and Küstrin on 1 November. The Prussian army under the command of Gebhard Leberecht von Blücher finally capitulated on 7 November. Her father, who had become a prisoner of war after the Battle of Jena-Auerstedt on 14 October, was released on this occasion.

In October 1806, Pauline with her mother and brothers left Berlin for Königsberg to escape the French troops. From birth, she had poor health, probably due to the difficult circumstances during her mother's pregnancy. According to doctors, she suffered from some kind of nervous fever. Due to bad weather while fleeing Berlin, Pauline's health quickly declined. On 15 December 1806 her condition became alarming; she died a week later, on 22 December. Her mother could hardly be separated from her deathbed and there were fears for her sanity. According to some sources Pauline died at the home of a mayor who had housed the family temporarily; according to others, she died on the Freienwalde, one of the royal Prussian possessions west of Berlin near the Oder. This estate had been recently occupied by Princess Frederika Louisa of Hesse-Darmstadt, her maternal grandmother.

Pauline was definitely buried on the Freienwalde estate. A monument by sculptor Johann Gottfried Schadow was put in place only in 1813. The neglected grave was rediscovered by the new owner of Freienwalde, Walther Rathenau in 1909. He discovered a weathered gravestone on the estate, inscribed with Pauline's name. The news was immediately reported to Queen Wilhelmina of the Netherlands, who had the remains exhumed. Without much pomp Pauline's remains were brought to the Netherlands by the Dutch ambassador in Berlin, Baron Gevers, and the chamberlain Van den Bosch in March 1911. During this trip, the bronze casket was placed with the luggage. On 7 April 1911 Pauline's remains finally were interred in the Royal Crypt in the Nieuwe Kerk in Delft. The text of her gravestone reads: "Grabmal of Friderike Louise Pauline Charlotte Wilhelmine Prinzessin von Nassau und Oranien - Born zu Berlin den 1 Maerz 1800 - died zu Freienwalde 22d Dezember 1806".
