= William I of the Netherlands =

King of the Netherlands from 1815 to 1840

William I
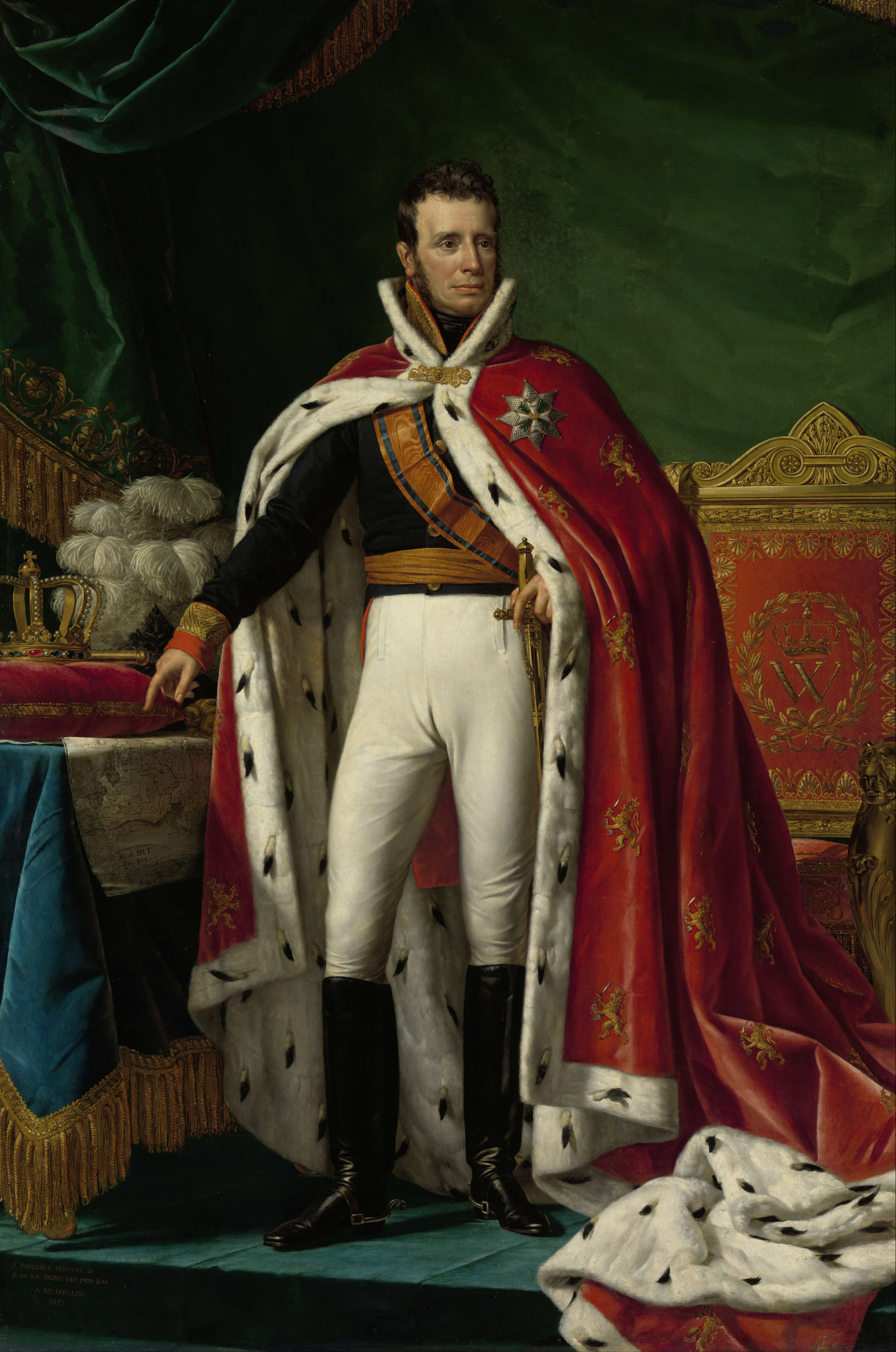
- Portrait of William I by Joseph Paelinck, 1819

King of the Netherlands Grand Duke of Luxembourg (as William I)
- Reign: 16 March 1815 – 7 October 1840
- Inauguration: 21 September 1815
- Predecessor: Himself as Sovereign Prince
- Successor: William II

Sovereign Prince of the Netherlands
- Reign: 20 November 1813 – 16 March 1815
- Successor: Himself as King

Prince of Orange (as William VI)
- Reign: 9 April – 12 July 1806, 19 October 1813 – 31 May 1815
- Predecessor: William V
- Successor: Incorpated into Nassau

Prince of Nassau-Orange-Fulda
- Reign: 25 February 1803 – 27 October 1806

Duke of Limburg
- Reign: 5 September 1839 – 7 October 1840
- Predecessor: Francis I
- Successor: William II
- Born: 24 August 1772; Huis ten Bosch, The Hague, Dutch Republic
- Died: 12 December 1843 (aged 71); Berlin, Kingdom of Prussia
- Burial: Nieuwe Kerk, Delft, Netherlands
- Spouses: Wilhelmina of Prussia (m. 1791; died 1837) Henrietta d'Oultremont (morganatic) (m. 1841)
- Issue: William II; Prince Frederick; Princess Pauline; Marianne, Princess Albert of Prussia
- House: Orange-Nassau
- Father: William V, Prince of Orange
- Mother: Princess Wilhelmina of Prussia

Military service
- Battles/wars: (incomplete): War of the First Coalition; Battle of Veurne; Battle of Lincelles; Battle of Menin; Siege of Maubeuge; Siege of Landrecies; Battle of Gosselies; Battle of Lambusart; Battle of Fleurus; War of the Fourth Coalition; Battle of Jena–Auerstedt; War of the Fifth Coalition; Battle of Wagram

William I (Note: William was titled as William I (Dutch: Willem I, French: Guillaume I, Luxembourgish: Wëllem I.) in the Netherlands and Luxembourg, while in the Principality of Orange, he ruled as William VI (Dutch: Willem VI).) (Willem Frederik; 24 August 1772 – 12 December 1843) was King of the Netherlands and Grand Duke of Luxembourg from 1815 until his abdication in 1840.

Born as the son of William V, Prince of Orange, the last stadtholder of the Dutch Republic, and Wilhelmina of Prussia, William experienced significant political upheavals early in life. He fought against the French invasion during the Flanders campaign, and after the Batavian Revolution in 1795, his family went into exile. He briefly ruled the Principality of Nassau-Orange-Fulda before Napoleon's French troops' occupation forced him out of power. Following the defeat of Napoleon in 1814, William was invited back to the Netherlands, where he proclaimed himself Sovereign Prince of the United Netherlands.

In 1815, William raised the Netherlands to a kingdom and concurrently became the grand duke of Luxembourg. His reign saw the adoption of a new constitution, which granted him extensive powers. He was a strong proponent of economic development, founding several universities and promoting trade. However, his efforts to impose the Reformed faith and the Dutch language in the mostly Catholic and partly French-speaking southern provinces, combined with economic grievances, sparked the Belgian Revolution in 1830. Unable to suppress the rebellion, William ultimately accepted Belgian independence in 1839 under the Treaty of London.

William's later years were marked by dissatisfaction with constitutional changes and personal reasons, leading to his abdication in 1840 in favor of his son, King William II. He spent his final years in Berlin, where he died in 1843.

== Life ==
William was the son of William V, Prince of Orange, the last stadtholder of the Dutch Republic, and Wilhelmina of Prussia. During the Flanders campaign, he commanded the Dutch troops and fought against the French invasion. The family went into exile in London in 1795 following the Batavian Revolution. As compensation for the loss of his father's possessions in the Low Countries, William was appointed ruler of the newly created Principality of Nassau-Orange-Fulda in 1803. When Napoleon invaded Germany in 1806, William fought on the Prussian side and was deposed upon French victory. With the death of his father in 1806, he became Prince of Orange and ruler of the Principality of Orange-Nassau, which he also lost the same year after the dissolution of the Holy Roman Empire and subsequent creation of the Confederation of the Rhine. He spent the following years in exile in Prussia. In 1813, following Napoleon's defeat at Leipzig, the Orange-Nassau territories were restored to William; he also accepted the offer to become Sovereign Prince of the United Netherlands.

William proclaimed himself king of the Netherlands in 1815. In the same year, he concluded a treaty with King Frederick William III in which he ceded the Orange-Nassau to Prussia in exchange for becoming the new grand duke of Luxembourg. As king, he adopted a new constitution, presided over strong economic and industrial progress, promoted trade and founded the universities of Leuven, Ghent and Liège. The imposition of the Reformed faith and the Dutch language, as well as feelings of economic inequity, caused widespread resentment in the southern provinces and led to the outbreak of the Belgian Revolution in 1830. William failed to crush the rebellion and in 1839 he accepted the independence of Belgium in accordance with the Treaty of London.

William's disapproval of changes to the constitution, the loss of Belgium and his intention to marry Henrietta d'Oultremont, a Roman Catholic, led to his decision to abdicate in 1840. His eldest son acceded to the throne as King William II. William died in 1843 in Berlin at the age of 71.

== Prince of Orange ==
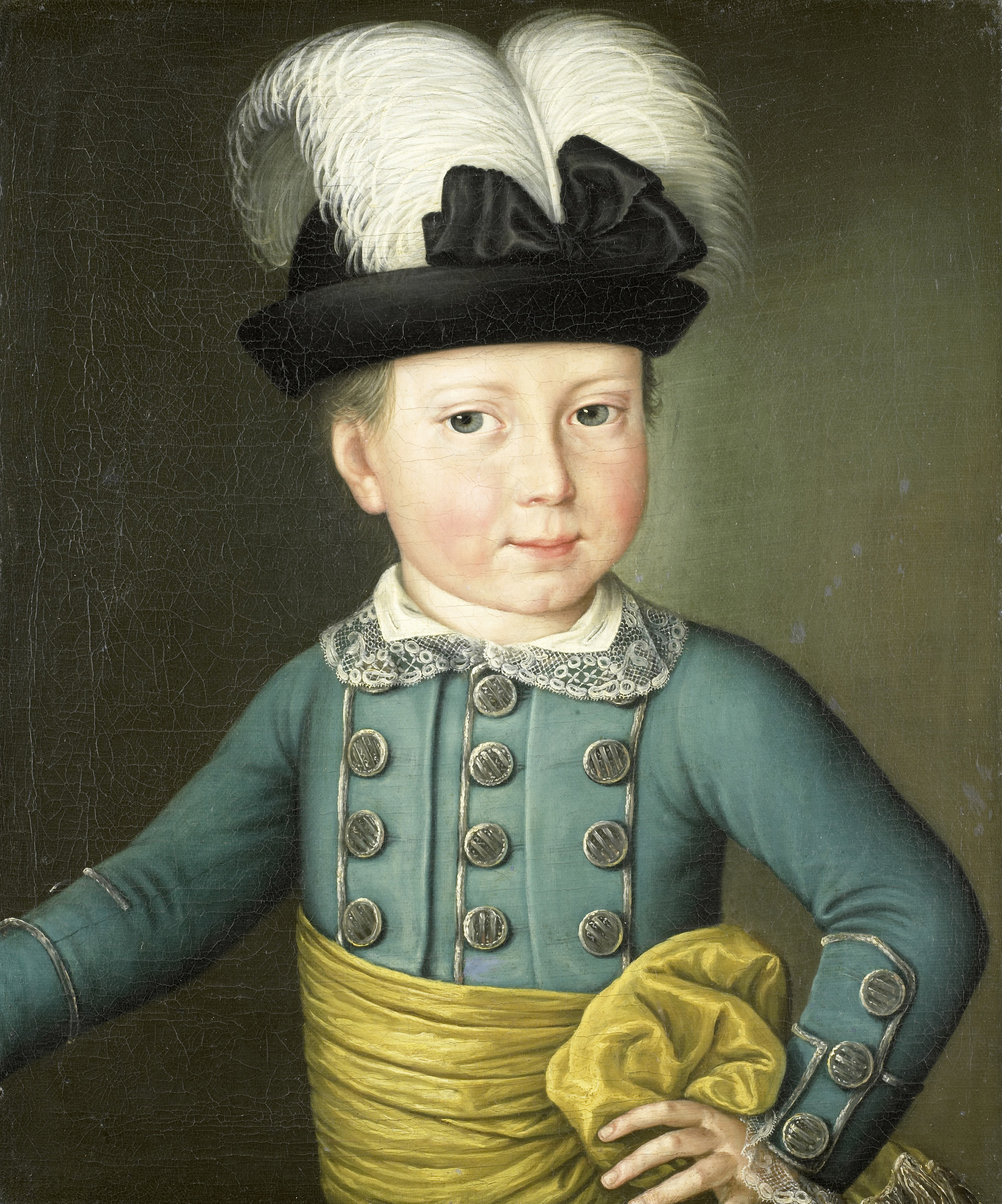
Portrait of William (1775)

King William I's parents were the last stadtholder William V, Prince of Orange of the Dutch Republic, and his wife Wilhelmina of Prussia. Until 1806, William was formally known as William VI, Prince of Orange-Nassau, (Note: The family name changed from "Nassau-Dietz" to "Orange-Nassau" when John William Friso, Prince of Orange claimed the inheritance of Prince William III of Orange in 1702.) and between 1806 and 1813 also as Prince of Orange. In Berlin on 1 October 1791, William married his maternal first cousin (Frederica Louisa) Wilhelmina of Prussia, born in Potsdam. She was the daughter of King Frederick William II of Prussia. After Wilhelmina died in 1837, William married Countess Henrietta d'Oultremont (28 February 1792, in Maastricht – 26 October 1864, in Schloss Rahe), created countess of Nassau, on 17 February 1841, also in Berlin.

=== Youth and early military career ===
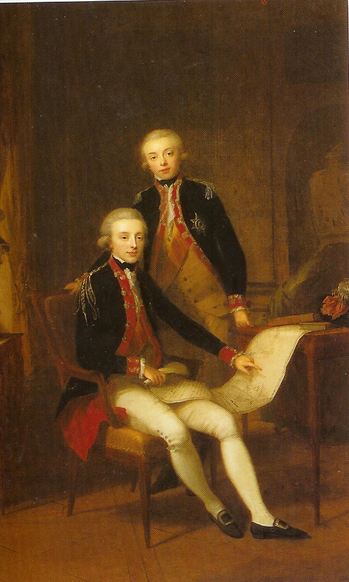
Young William and his brother Frederick in 1790

As eldest son of the William V, Prince of Orange, William was informally referred to as Erfprins (Note: German: Erbprinz) (Hereditary Prince) by contemporaries from his birth until the death of his father in 1806 to distinguish him from William V.

Like his younger brother Prince Frederick of Orange-Nassau he was tutored by the Swiss mathematician Leonhard Euler and the Dutch historian Herman Tollius. They were both tutored in the military arts by General Frederick Stamford. After the Patriot revolt had been suppressed in 1787, he in 1788–89 attended the military academy in Brunswick which was considered an excellent military school, together with his brother. In 1790 he visited a number of foreign courts like the one in Nassau and the Prussian capital Berlin, where he first met his future wife.

William subsequently studied briefly at the University of Leiden. In 1790 he was appointed a general of infantry in the Dutch States Army of which his father was Captain general, and he was made a member of the Council of State of the Netherlands. In November 1791 he took his new bride to The Hague.

After the National Convention of the French Republic had declared war on the Dutch Republic in February 1793, William was appointed commander-in-chief of the veldleger (mobile army) of the States Army (his father remained the nominal head of the armed forces). As such he commanded the troops that took part in the Flanders Campaign of 1793–95. He took part in the Battles of Veurne and Menin (where his brother was wounded) in 1793, and commanded during the Siege of Landrecies (1794), whose fortress surrendered to him. In May 1794 he had replaced general Kaunitz as commander of the combined Austro-Dutch forces on the instigation of Emperor Francis II who apparently had a high opinion of him. William was victorious at the Battles of Gosselies and Lambusart and proved to be an able commander, but the French armies ultimately proved too strong, and the general allied leadership too inept. Despite a well-executed attack by William on the French left, the allied army under Coburg was finally defeated at the Battle of Fleurus. The French first entered Dutch Brabant which they dominated after the Battle of Boxtel. When in the winter of 1794–95 the rivers in the Rhine delta froze over, the French breached the southern Hollandic Water Line and the situation became militarily untenable. In many places Dutch revolutionaries took over the local government. After the Batavian Revolution in Amsterdam on 18 January 1795 the stadtholder decided to flee to England, and his sons accompanied him. (On this last day in Holland his father relieved William honorably of his commands). The next day the Batavian Republic was proclaimed.

=== Exile ===
Soon after the departure to England the hereditary prince went back to the continent, where his brother was assembling former members of the States Army in Osnabrück for a planned invasion into the Batavian Republic in the summer of 1795. However, the neutral Prussian government forbade this.

In 1799, William landed in modern-day North Holland as part of the Anglo-Russian invasion of Holland. He was instrumental in fomenting a mutiny among the crews of a Batavian Navy squadron under Rear-Admiral Samuel Story, resulting in the squadron surrendering without a fight to the Royal Navy, which accepted the surrender in the name of the stadtholder. Not all the local Dutch population, however, was pleased with the arrival of the prince. One local Orangist was even executed. (Note: The freule (baroness) Judith Van Dorth tot Holthuizen; see Schama, p. 397) The hoped-for popular uprising failed to materialise. After several minor battles the hereditary prince was forced to leave the country again after the Convention of Alkmaar. The mutineers of the Batavian fleet, with their ships, and a large number of deserters from the Batavian army accompanied the retreating British troops to Britain. There William formed the King's Dutch Brigade with these troops, a military unit in British service, that swore oaths of allegiance to the British king, but also to the States General, defunct since 1795, "whenever those would be reconstituted." (Note: The States General were the sovereign power in the defunct Dutch Republic; the troops of the States Army had also sworn loyalty to the States General and not the stadtholder.) This brigade trained on the Isle of Wight in 1800 and was stationed in Ireland for a time.

When peace was concluded between Britain and the French Republic under First Consul Napoleon Bonaparte the Orange exiles were at their nadir. The Dutch Brigade was dissolved on 12 July 1802. Many members of the brigade went home to the Batavian Republic, thanks to an amnesty. The surrendered ships of the Batavian Navy were not returned, due to an agreement between the stadtholder and the British government of 11 March 1800. Instead the stadtholder was allowed to sell them to the Royal Navy for an appreciable sum.

The stadtholder, feeling discontented with the British, left for Germany. The hereditary prince, having a more flexible mind, went to visit Napoleon at St. Cloud in 1802. He apparently charmed the First Consul, and was charmed by him. Napoleon raised hopes for William that he might have an important role in a reformed Batavian Republic. Meanwhile, William's brother-in-law Frederick William III of Prussia, neutral at the time, promoted a Franco-Prussian convention of 23 May 1802, in addition to the Treaty of Amiens, that gave the House of Orange a few abbatial domains in Germany, that were combined to the Principality of Nassau-Orange-Fulda by way of indemnification for its losses in the Batavian Republic. The stadtholder gave this principality immediately to his son.

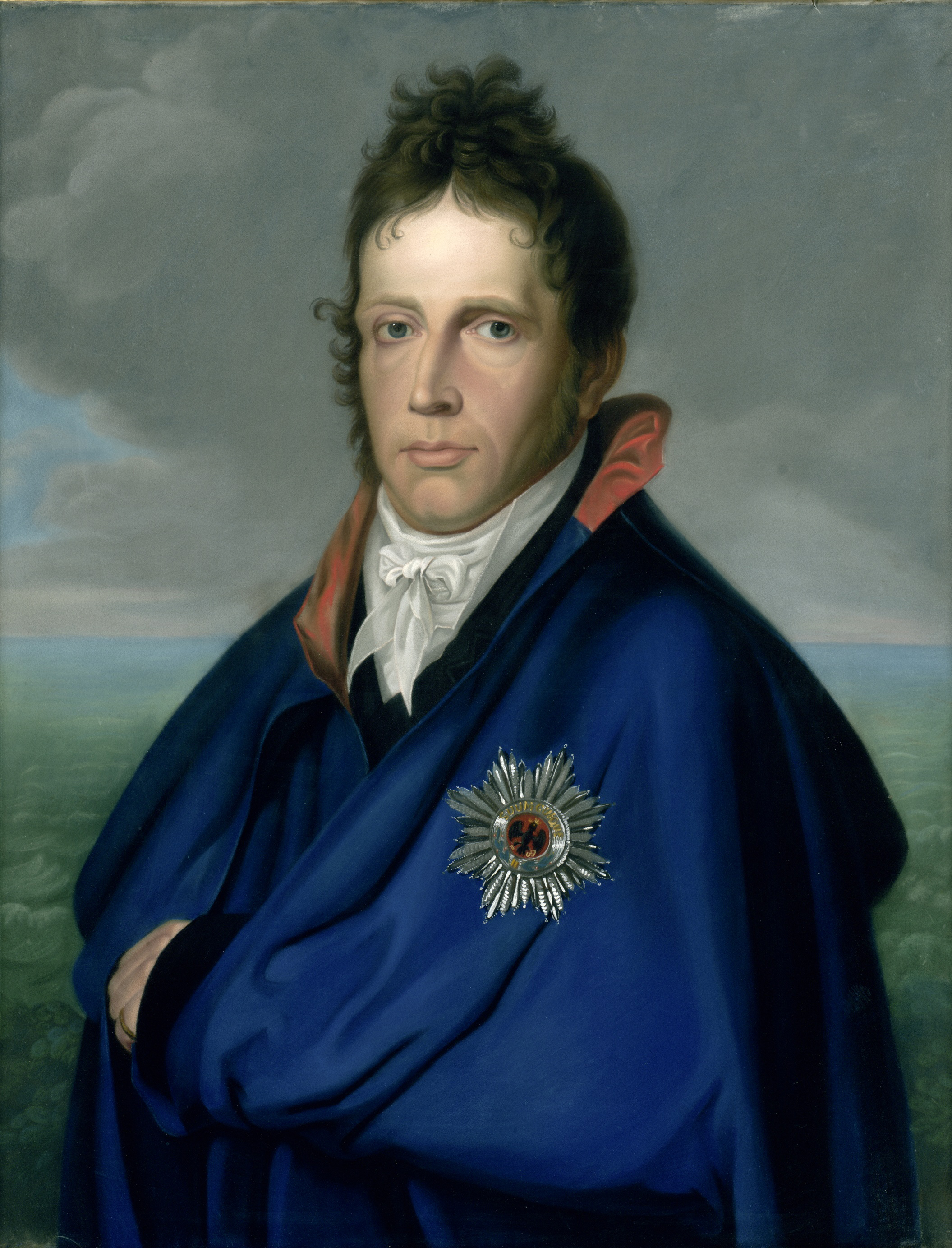
William Frederick, Prince of Orange in c. 1805–1810

When war broke out between the French Empire and Prussia in 1806, William supported his Prussian relatives, though he was nominally a French vassal. He received command of a Prussian division which took part in the Battle of Jena–Auerstedt. The Prussians lost that battle and William was forced to surrender his troops rather ignominiously at Erfurt the day after the battle. He was made a prisoner of war, but was paroled soon. Napoleon punished him for his betrayal, however, by taking away his principality. As a parolee, William was not allowed to take part in the hostilities anymore. After the Peace of Tilsit William received a pension from France in compensation.

In the same year, 1806, his father, the Prince of Orange died, and William not only inherited the title, but also his father's claims on the inheritance embodied in the Nassau lands. This would become important a few years later, when developments in Germany coincided to make William the Fürst (Prince) of a diverse assembly of Nassau lands that had belonged to other branches of the House of Nassau.

But before this came about, in 1809 tensions between Austria and France became intense, resulting in the War of the Fifth Coalition. William did not hesitate to join the Austrian army as a Feldmarschalleutnant (major-general) in May 1809 As a member of the staff of the Austrian supreme commander, Archduke Charles he took part in the Battle of Wagram, where he was wounded in the leg.

Tsar Alexander I of Russia played a central role in the restoration of the Netherlands. Prince William VI (as he was now known), who had been living in exile in Prussia, met with Alexander I in March 1813. Alexander promised to support William and help restore an independent Netherlands with William as king. Russian troops in the Netherlands participated with their Prussian allies in restoring the dynasty. Dynastic considerations of marriage between the royal houses of Great Britain and the Netherlands, assured British approval.

=== Return ===
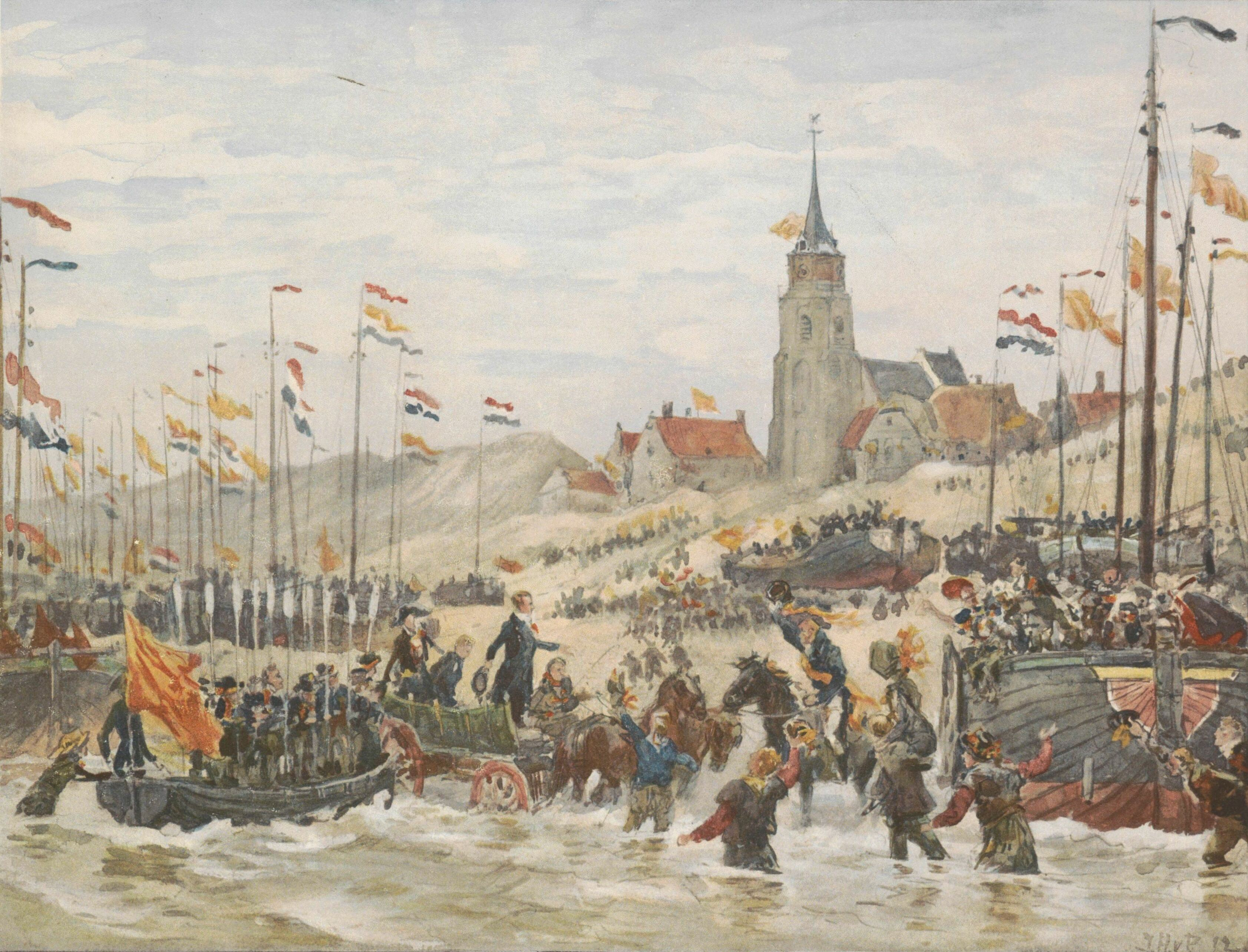
Landing of William in Scheveningen on 30 November 1813

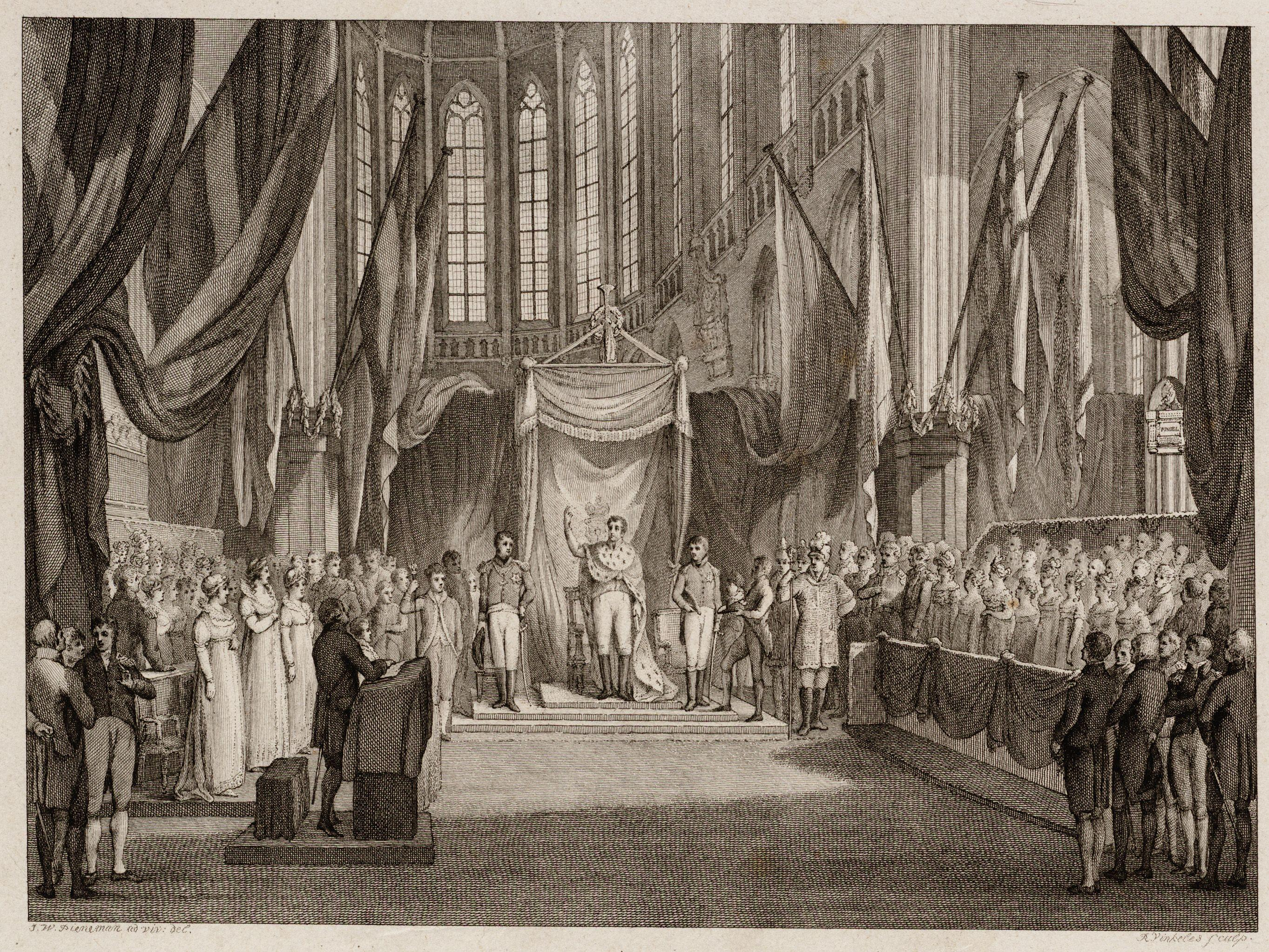
Inauguration of William as sovereign Prince of the Netherlands in Amsterdam on 30 March 1814

After Napoleon's defeat at Leipzig (October 1813), the French troops retreated to France from all over Europe. The Netherlands had been annexed to the French Empire by Napoleon in 1810. But now city after city was evacuated by the French occupation troops. In the ensuing power vacuum a number of former Orangist politicians and former Patriots formed a provisional government in November 1813. Although a large number of the members of the provisional government had helped drive out William V 18 years earlier, it was taken for granted that his son would have to head any new government. They also agreed it would be better in the long term for the Dutch to restore him themselves, rather than have the Great Powers impose him on the country. The Dutch population were pleased with the departure of the French, who had ruined the Dutch economy, and this time welcomed the prince.

After having been invited by the Triumvirate of 1813, on 30 November 1813 William disembarked from HMS Warrior and landed at Scheveningen beach, only a few yards from the place where he had left the country with his father 18 years before, and on 6 December the provisional government offered him the title of king. William refused, instead proclaiming himself "Sovereign Prince of the Netherlands". He also wanted the rights of the people to be guaranteed by "a wise constitution".

The constitution offered William extensive, nearly absolute powers: ministers were only responsible to him, while a unicameral parliament (the States General) exercised only limited power. He was inaugurated as sovereign prince in the New Church in Amsterdam on 30 March 1814. In August 1814, he was appointed Governor-General of the former Austrian Netherlands and the Prince-Bishopric of Liège (more or less modern-day Belgium) by the Allied Powers who occupied that country, ruling them on behalf of Prussia. He was also made Grand Duke of Luxembourg, having received that territory in return for trading his hereditary German lands to Prussia and the Duke of Nassau. The Great Powers had already agreed via the secret Eight Articles of London to unite the Low Countries into a single kingdom, it was believed that this would help keep France in check. With the de facto addition of the Austrian Netherlands and Luxembourg to his realm, William had fulfilled his family's three-century dream of uniting the Low Countries.

== King of the Netherlands ==
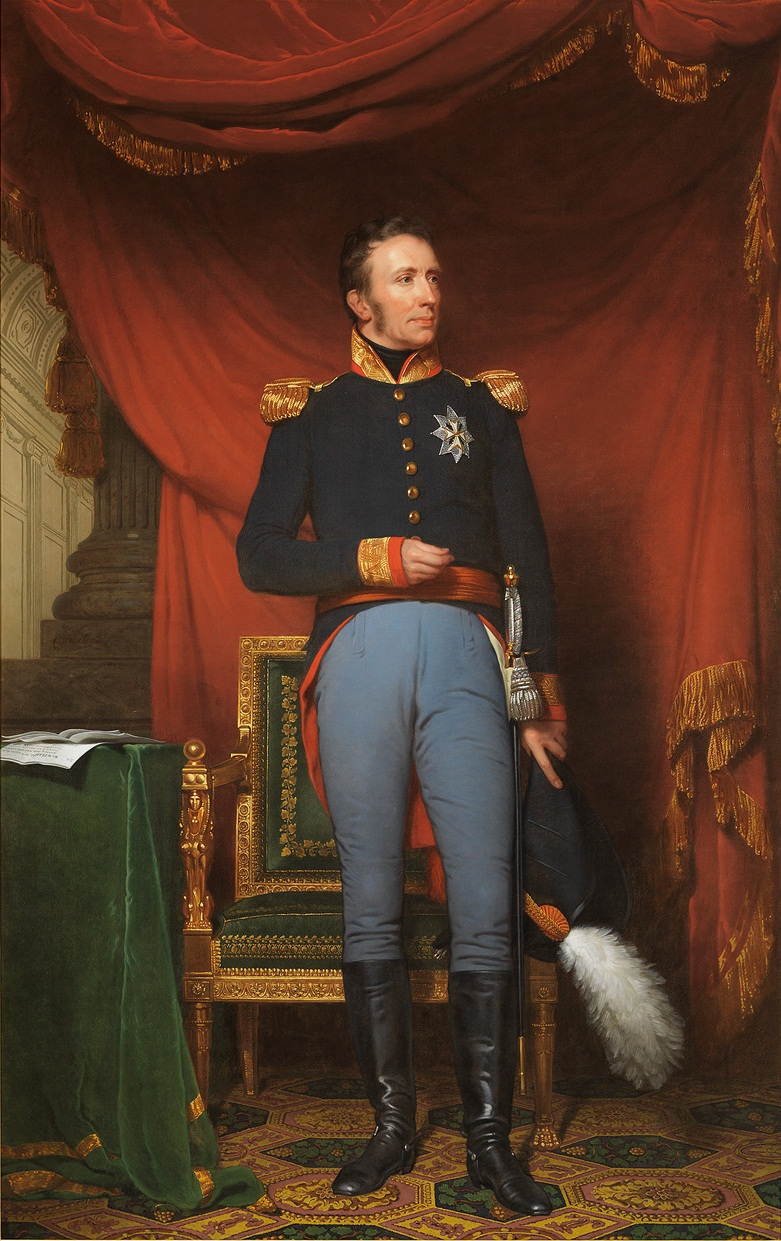
Portrait of William I (1816)

Feeling threatened by Napoleon, who had escaped from Elba, William proclaimed the Netherlands a kingdom on 16 March 1815 at the urging of the powers gathered at the Congress of Vienna. His son, the future king William II, fought as a commander at the Battle of Waterloo. After Napoleon had been sent into exile, William adopted a new constitution which included many features of its predecessor, including the near-autocratic powers vested in the crown. He was formally confirmed as hereditary ruler of what was known as the United Kingdom of the Netherlands at the Congress of Vienna.

=== Principal changes ===
The States General was divided into two chambers. The Eerste Kamer (First Chamber or Senate or House of Lords) was appointed by the king. The Tweede Kamer (Second Chamber or House of Representatives or House of Commons) was elected by the Provincial States, which were in turn chosen by census suffrage. The 110 seats were divided equally between the north and the south, although the population of the north (2 million) was significantly less than that of the south (3.5 million). The States General's primary function was to approve the king's laws and decrees. The constitution contained many present-day Dutch political institutions; however, their functions and composition have changed greatly over the years.

The constitution was accepted in the north, but not in the south. The under-representation of the south was one of the causes of the Belgian Revolution. Referendum turnout was low, in the southern provinces, but William interpreted all abstentions to be yes votes. He prepared a lavish inauguration for himself in Brussels, where he gave the people copper coins (leading to his first nickname, the Copper King).

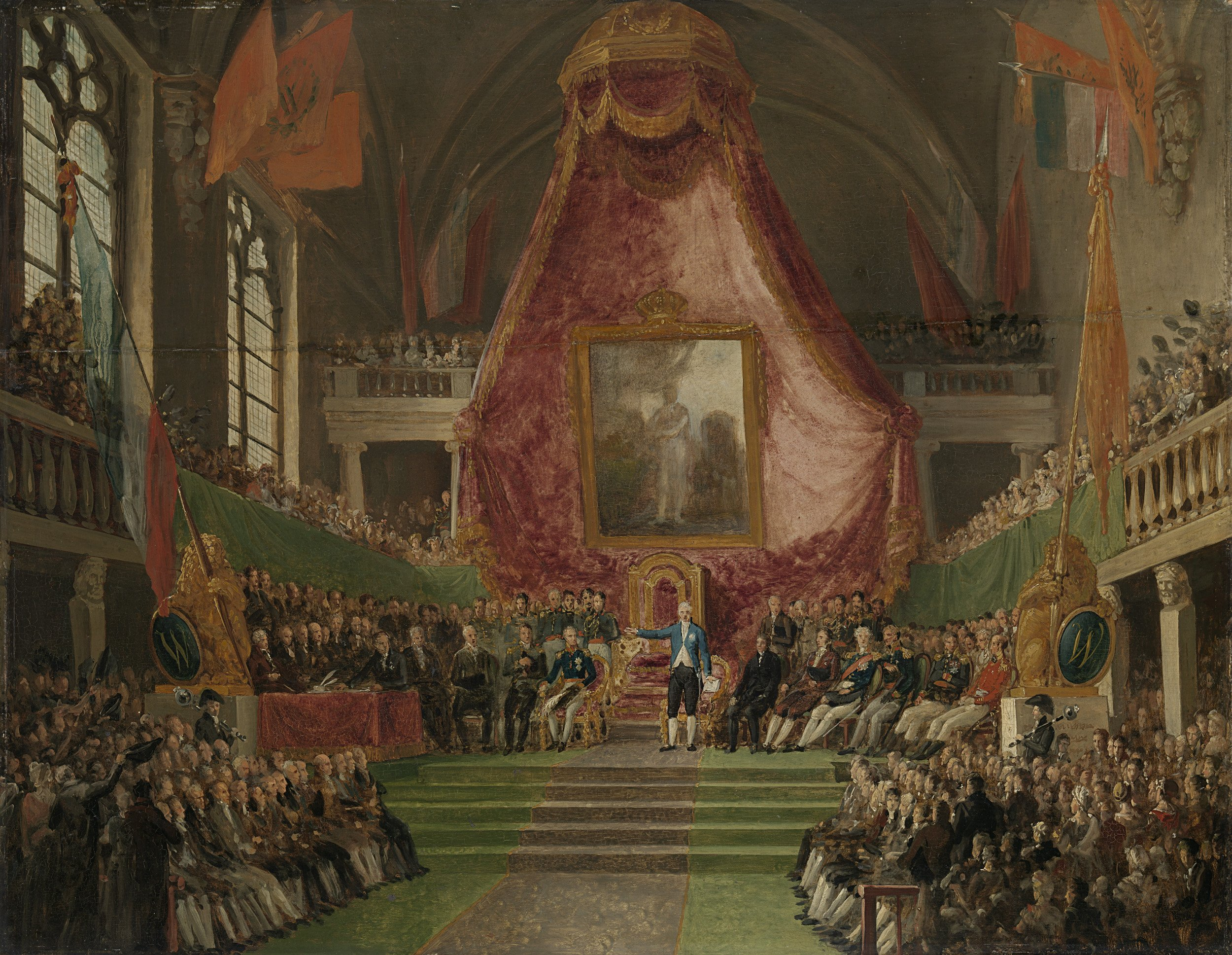
Establishment of the State University of Ghent in 1817

The spearhead of King William's policies was economic progress. As he founded many trade institutions, his second nickname was the King-Merchant. In 1822, he founded the Algemeene Nederlandsche Maatschappij ter Begunstiging van de Volksvlijt, which would become one of the most important institutions of Belgium after its independence. Industry flourished, especially in the South. In 1817, he also founded three universities in the southern provinces, such as a new University of Leuven, the University of Ghent and the University of Liège. The northern provinces, meanwhile, were the centre of trade. This, in combination with the colonies (Dutch East Indies, Surinam, Curaçao and Dependencies, and the Dutch Gold Coast) created great wealth for the kingdom. However, the money flowed into the hands of Dutch directors. Only a few Belgians managed to profit from the economic growth. Feelings of economic inequity were another cause of the Belgian uprising.

William was also determined to create a unified people, even though the north and the south had drifted far apart culturally and economically since the south was reconquered by Spain after the Act of Abjuration of 1581. The north was commercial, Protestant and entirely Dutch-speaking; the south was industrial, Roman Catholic and divided between Dutch and French-speakers. To that end, he concluded his family's longtime factional song, Wilhelmus, was no longer suitable for the times. The song referenced the desire of the founder of his house, William the Silent, to be rewarded with a "realm" for fighting against Spain. Having fulfilled his family's quest to unite that "realm," William wanted to show he represented the entire nation, not just a faction. He was also well aware that the Wilhelmus had Calvinist connotations, and would not have much appeal in the south. A new song, Wien Neêrlands Bloed (Those With Dutch Blood), won a contest for a new anthem, and remained in place through 1932.

Officially, a separation of church and state existed in the kingdom. However, William himself was a strong supporter of the Reformed Church. This led to resentment among the people in the mostly Catholic south. William had also devised controversial language and school policies. Dutch was imposed as the official language in (the Dutch-speaking region of) Flanders; this angered French-speaking aristocrats and industrial workers. Schools throughout the kingdom were required to instruct students in the Reformed faith and the Dutch language. Many in the south feared that the king sought to extinguish Catholicism and the French language.

=== Revolt of the Southern Provinces ===
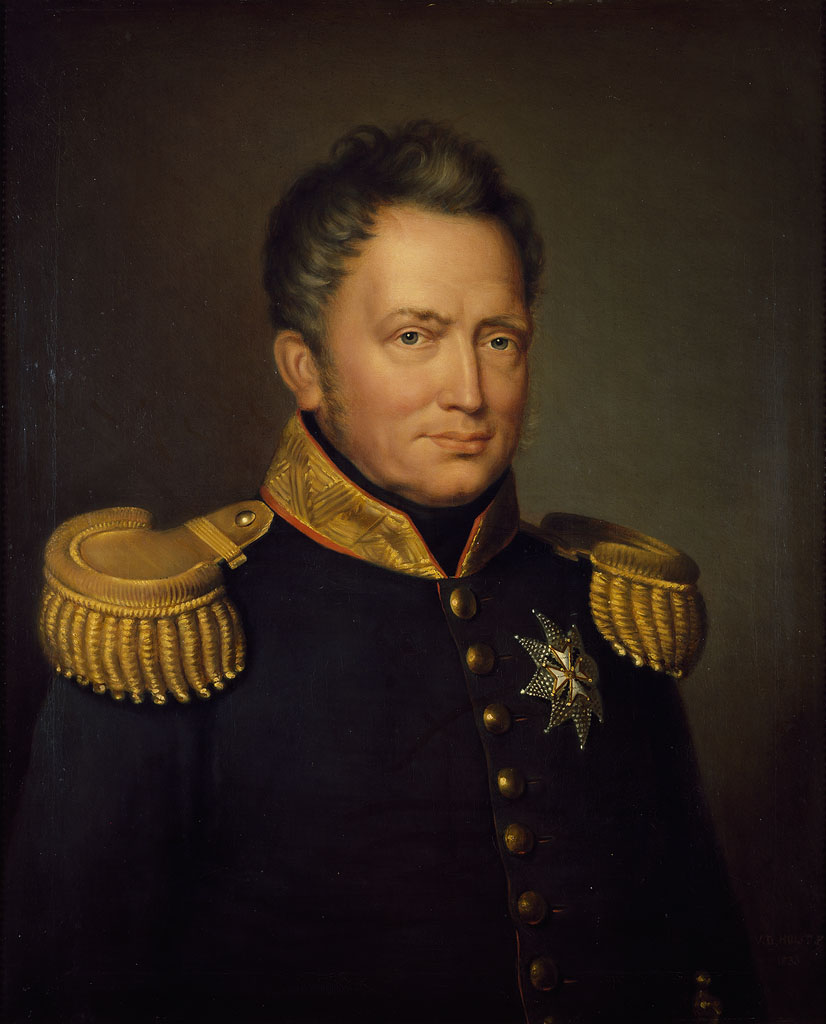
Portrait of William I (1833)

In August 1830 Daniel Auber's opera La muette de Portici, about the repression of Neapolitans, was staged in Brussels. Performances of this opera seemed to crystallize a sense of nationalism and "Hollandophobia" in Brussels, and spread to the rest of the south. Rioting ensued, chiefly aimed at the kingdom's unpopular justice minister, Cornelis Felix van Maanen, who lived in Brussels. An infuriated William responded by sending troops to repress the riots. However, the riots had spread to other southern cities. The riots quickly became popular uprisings. An independent state of Belgium emerged out of the 1830 Revolution.

The next year, William sent his sons William, the Prince of Orange, (Note: This had become a courtesy title for the Dutch crown prince under the new kingdom.) and Prince Frederick to invade the new state. Although initially victorious in this Ten Days' Campaign, the Royal Netherlands Army was forced to retreat after the threat of French intervention. Some support for the Orange dynasty (chiefly among the Flemish) persisted for years, but the Dutch never regained control over Belgium. William nevertheless continued the war for eight years. His economic successes became overshadowed by a perceived mismanagement of the war effort. High costs of the war came to burden the Dutch economy, fueling public resentment. In 1839, William was forced to end the war. The United Kingdom of the Netherlands was dissolved by the Treaty of London (1839) and the northern part continued as the Kingdom of the Netherlands. It was not renamed, however, as the "United-" prefix had never been part of its official name, but rather was retrospectively added by historians for descriptive purposes.

=== Constitutional changes and abdication in later life ===
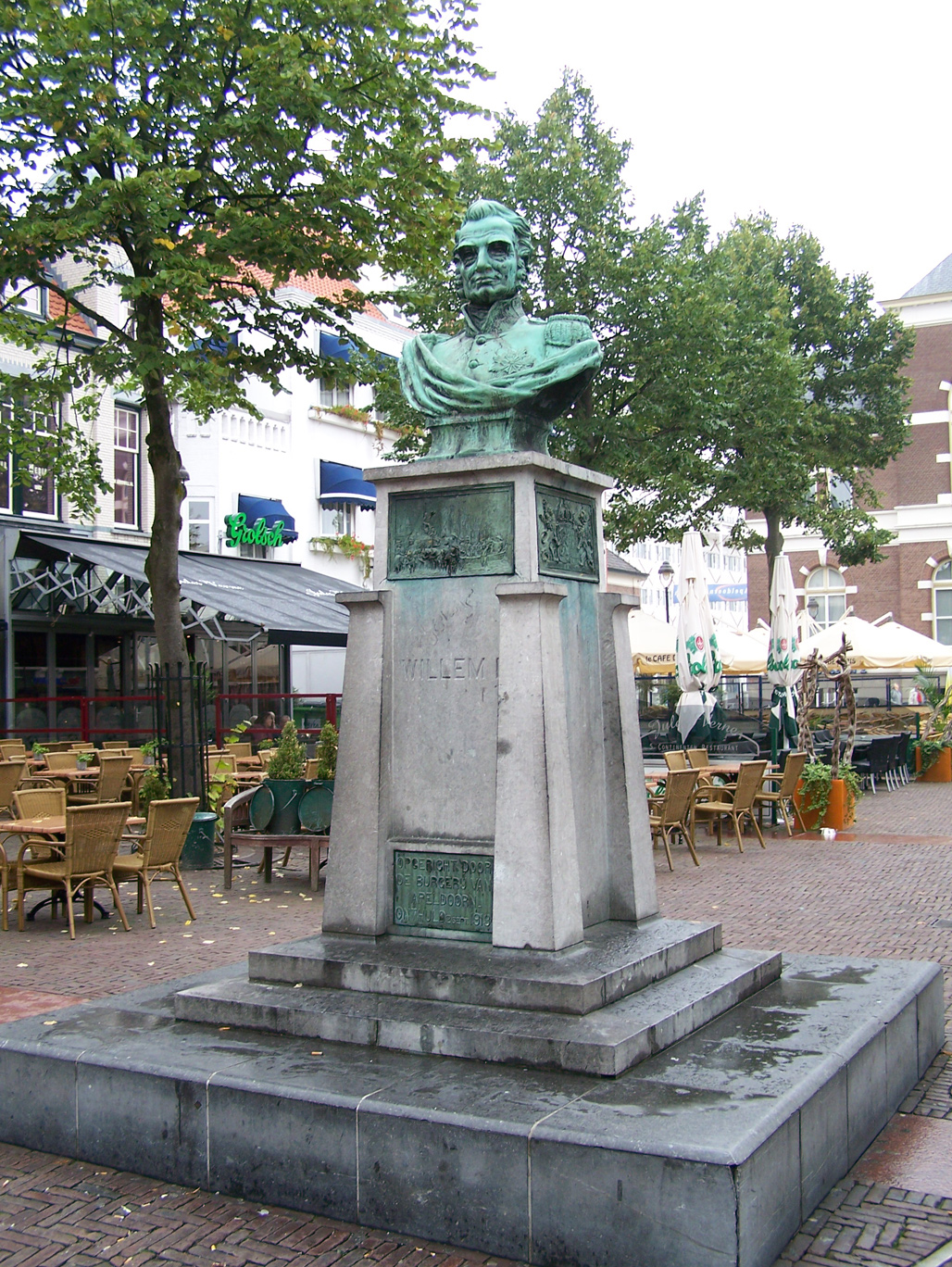
Statue of Willem I of the Netherlands by Pieter Puype (1913) in Apeldoorn

Constitutional changes were initiated in 1840 because the terms which involved the United Kingdom of the Netherlands had to be removed. These constitutional changes also included the introduction of judicial ministerial responsibility. Although the policies remained uncontrolled by parliament, the prerogative was controllable now. The very conservative William could not live with these constitutional changes. This, the disappointment about the loss of Belgium, and his intention to marry Henrietta d'Oultremont (paradoxically both "Belgian" and Roman Catholic) made him wish to abdicate. He fulfilled this intent on 7 October 1840 and his eldest son acceded to the throne as King William II. William I died in 1843 in Berlin at the age of 71.

== Children ==
With his wife Wilhelmina, King William I had six children:

- Willem Frederik George Lodewijk (b. The Hague, 6 December 1792 – d. Tilburg, 17 March 1849) later King William II of the Netherlands from 1840. Married Grand Duchess Anna Pavlovna of Russia.
- Stillborn son (Hampton Court Palace, England, 18 August 1795).
- Willem Frederik Karel (b. Berlin, 28 February 1797 – d. Wassenaar, 8 September 1881), married on 21 May 1825 his first cousin Louise, daughter of Frederick William III of Prussia.
- Wilhelmina Frederika Louise Pauline Charlotte (b. Berlin, 1 March 1800 – d. Freienwalde, 22 December 1806).
- Stillborn son (Berlin, 30 August 1806).
- Wilhelmina Frederika Louise Charlotte Marianne (b. Berlin, 9 May 1810 – d. Schloss Reinhartshausen bei Erbach, 29 May 1883), married on 14 September 1830 with Prince Albert of Prussia. They divorced in 1849.

== Honours and arms ==
=== Honours ===
- Netherlands:
  - Founder and Grand Master of the Military Order of William, 30 April 1815
  - Founder and Grand Master of the Order of the Netherlands Lion, 29 September 1815
- Sweden: Knight of the Order of the Seraphim, 14 April 1813
- Spain: 876th Knight of the Order of the Golden Fleece, 5 July 1814
- United Kingdom:
  - 648th Knight of the Order of the Garter, 10 August 1814
  - Honorary Knight of the Order of the Bath, 16 August 1814; Grand Cross (military), 2 January 1815
- Prussia: Knight of the Order of the Black Eagle, 8 February 1787
- Portugal: Grand Cross of the Sash of the Three Orders, October 1825
- Austria: Grand Cross of the Order of St. Stephen, 1837
- Saxe-Weimar-Eisenach: Grand Cross of the Order of the White Falcon, 20 November 1839

=== Coats of arms ===

Royal coat of arms of King William I

Royal monogram

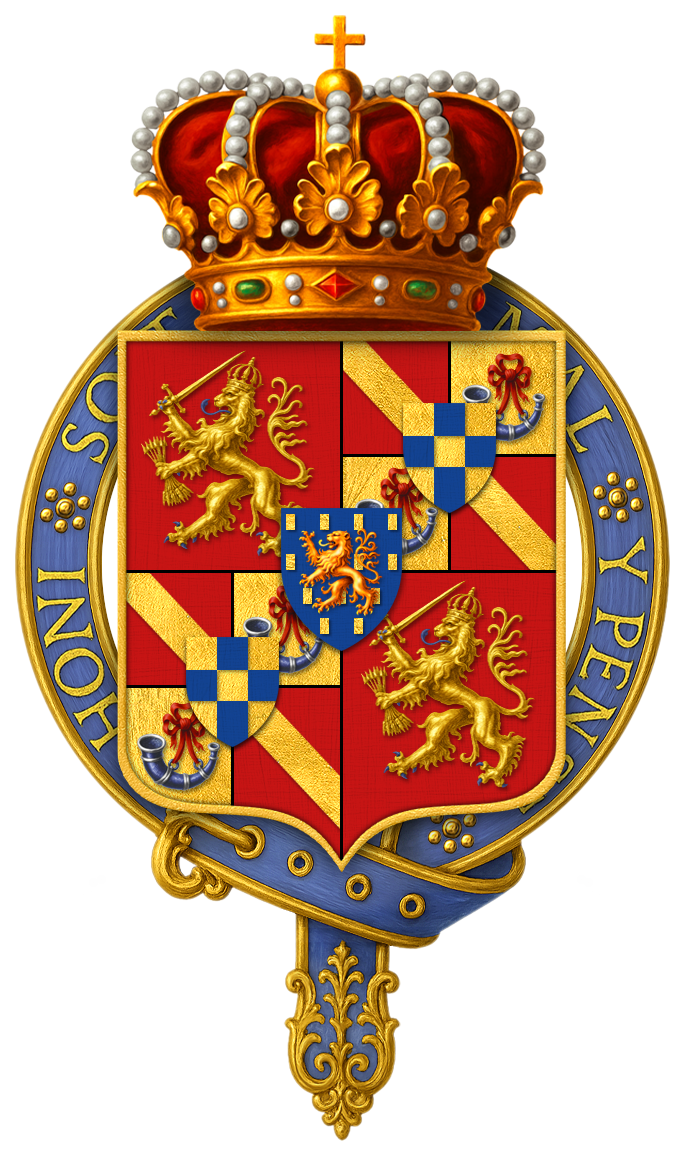

Arms as Sovereign Prince of the Netherlands

== Ancestry ==
Ancestors of William I of the Netherlands

8. John William Friso, Prince of Orange
4. William IV, Prince of Orange
9. Princess Marie Louise of Hesse-Kassel
2. William V, Prince of Orange
10. George II of Great Britain
5. Anne, Princess Royal
11. Princess Caroline of Brandenburg-Ansbach
1. William I of the Netherlands
12. Frederick William I of Prussia
6. Prince Augustus William of Prussia
13. Princess Sophia Dorothea of Hanover
3. Princess Wilhelmina of Prussia
14. Ferdinand Albert II, Duke of Brunswick-Wolfenbüttel
7. Duchess Luise of Brunswick-Wolfenbüttel
15. Duchess Antoinette of Brunswick-Wolfenbüttel

== Notes ==
William I of the Netherlands House of Orange-Nassau Cadet branch of the House of Nassau Born: 24 August 1772 Died: 12 December 1843
Dutch royalty
Preceded by William V	Prince of Orange; 1806–1815	Succeeded by William II
New creation	Count of Nassau; 1840–43	Abolished
Regnal titles
New creation due to German mediatization	Prince of Nassau-Orange-Fulda; 1803–06	Confiscated due to creation Confederation of the Rhine
Preceded by William V	Prince of Orange-Nassau; 1806, 1813–15	Abolished Incorporated into Nassau
Preceded by Louis II as King of Holland	Sovereign Prince of the Netherlands; 1813–15	Succeeded by Himself as King
Preceded by Himself as Sovereign Prince	King of the Netherlands; 1815–40	Succeeded by William II
Vacant Title last held by Francis I as Duke of Luxembourg	Grand Duke of Luxembourg; 1815–40	Succeeded by William II
Vacant Title last held by Francis I as Duke of Limburg	Duke of Limburg; 1839–40	Succeeded by William II
