= Van de Hulst =

van de Hulst may refer to:

- 2413 van de Hulst, asteroid
- Hendrik C. van de Hulst, Dutch astronomer
