= Wilhelmine of Prussia, Queen of the Netherlands =

Queen of the Netherlands from 1815 to 1837

Wilhelmine of Prussia
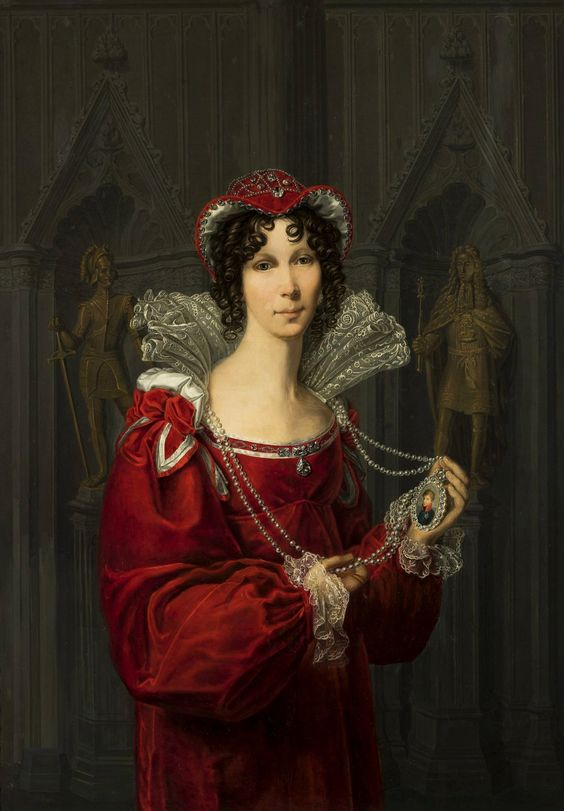
- Portrait by Friedrich Bury, 1815

Queen consort of the Netherlands Grand Duchess consort of Luxembourg
- Tenure: 16 March 1815 – 12 October 1837
- Born: 18 November 1774; Potsdam, Prussia
- Died: 12 October 1837 (aged 62); Noordeinde Palace, The Hague, Netherlands
- Burial: Nieuwe Kerk, Delft
- Spouse: William I of the Netherlands (m. 1791)
- Issue: William II; Prince Frederick; Princess Pauline; Marianne, Princess of Prussia
Names
- Friederike Luise Wilhelmine
- House: Hohenzollern
- Father: Frederick William II of Prussia
- Mother: Frederica Louisa of Hesse-Darmstadt

Wilhelmine of Prussia (Friederike Luise Wilhelmine; 18 November 1774 – 12 October 1837) was the first Queen consort of the Netherlands as the first wife of King William I of the Netherlands. She had a modest public role but acted as a patron of the arts.

== Biography ==
Princess Wilhelmine was born in Potsdam. She was the fourth child of eight born to King Frederick William II of Prussia and Queen Frederica Louisa. Her upbringing was dominated by the strict regime of her great-uncle, Frederick the Great, but in general very little is known about her youth. She was given a conventional education for a girl of her time and tutored in needlework and the arts, and described as pretty and sweet.

=== Marriage ===
On 1 October 1791, she married her cousin William of the Netherlands, son of Stadtholder William V, Prince of Orange and Princess Wilhelmina of Prussia, in Berlin. The marriage was arranged as a part of an alliance between the House of Orange and Prussia, but it was also, in fact, a love match and became a happy one. The young couple went to live at Noordeinde Palace in The Hague.

In 1795, the French invaded the Dutch Republic, and the princely family went into exile. They first stayed in England, and from 1796 in Berlin. In Berlin, the couple lived with her birth family in royal state in the "Niederländischen Palais" ('Dutch Palace'). In 1806, Wilhelmine was again forced to flee from the French army, and settled under difficult economic circumstances in Silesia.

Wilhelmine returned to The Hague at the beginning of 1814.

=== Queen ===
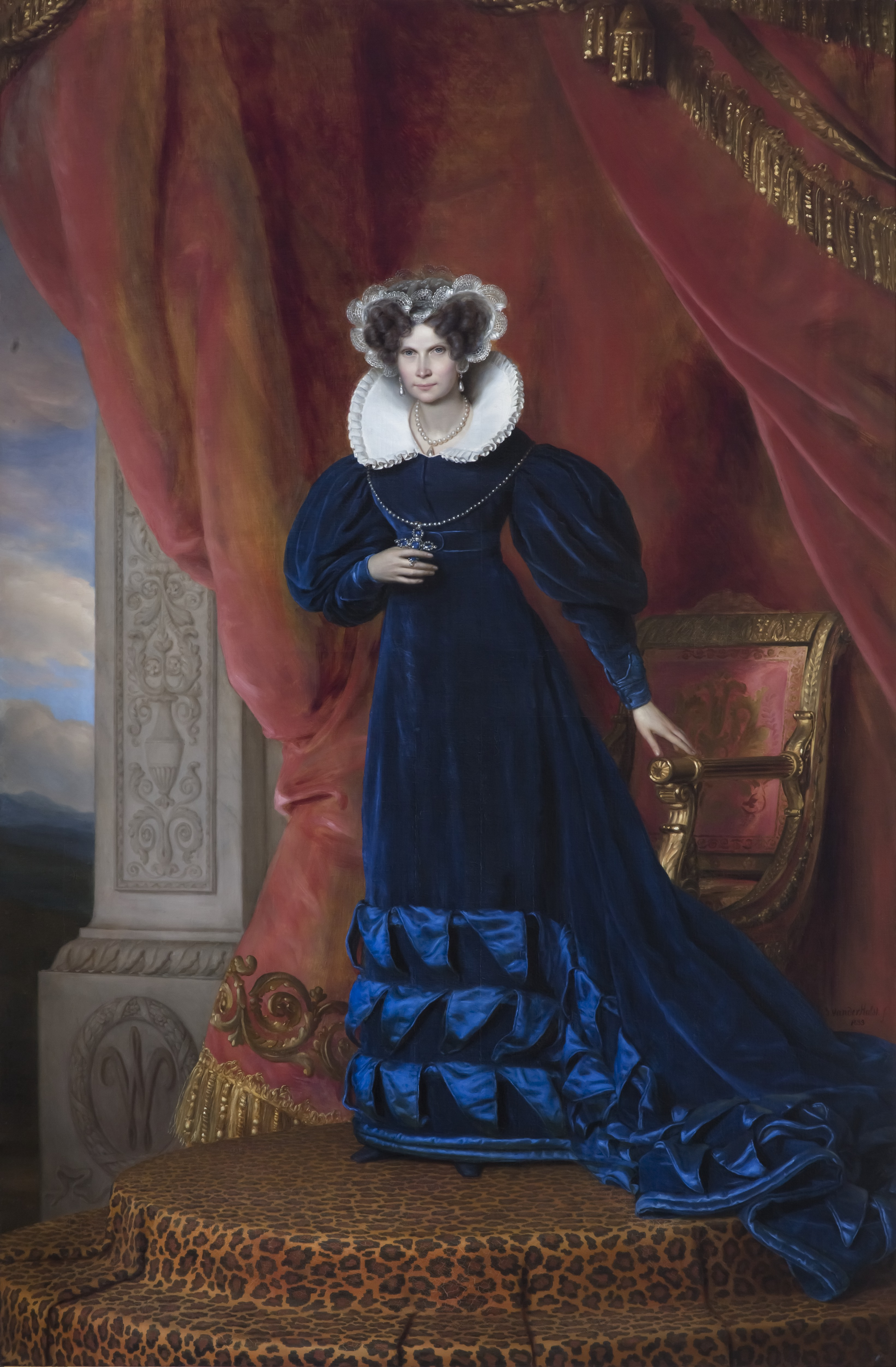
Queen Wilhelmine of the Netherlands in middle age, by Jan Baptist van der Hulst, 1833.

Wilhelmine became Queen of the Netherlands in 1815. At the time, the Netherlands included the present-day country of Belgium. The court divided their time between the two and divided their winters between The Hague and Brussels, and their summers between Het Loo and Laeken. Wilhelmine personally visited Berlin once a year until her death, where she continued to live in the "Niederländischen Palast" during her visit. She participated in royal representation during her stay in Berlin, as well as attending to her estates in Silesia.

Queen Wilhelmine was modest and stayed in the background, and she did not play any dominant role as queen. She was beloved by her family but was not a popular queen, and was criticized in The Netherlands for isolating the royal family, and later Belgium for her German fashion. Beginning in 1820, her health worsened, and after 1829, she was rarely seen in public, though she continued her trips to Berlin and visiting relatives.

Coat of Arms of Wilhelmine of Prussia

She was interested in painting, attended exhibitions, and helped to protect museums and support artists. She was herself a student of art and regarded as a talented dilettante, ultimately being inducted as an honorary member to the Royal Academy of Fine Arts in Amsterdam. She was a student of Friedrich Bury, financed an Italian study trip for Bonaventura Genelli, and supported the renovation of the royal museum.

She died at Noordeinde Palace in The Hague in 1837, aged 62, and is entombed in the New Church in Delft.

== Issue ==
Name	Birth	Death	Notes
King William II of the Netherlands	6 December 1792	17 March 1849	married, 1816, Grand Duchess Anna Pavlovna of Russia; had issue
Stillborn son	18 August 1795	18 August 1795
Prince Frederick of the Netherlands	28 February 1797	8 September 1881	married, 1825, Princess Louise of Prussia; had issue
Princess Pauline of Orange-Nassau	1 March 1800	22 December 1806
Stillborn son	30 August 1806	30 August 1806
Princess Marianne of the Netherlands	9 May 1810	29 May 1883	married, 1830, Prince Albert of Prussia; had issue

== Ancestry ==
Ancestors of Wilhelmine of Prussia, Queen of the Netherlands

8. Frederick William I of Prussia
4. Prince Augustus William of Prussia
9. Princess Sophia Dorothea of Hanover
2. Frederick William II of Prussia
10. Ferdinand Albert II, Duke of Brunswick-Wolfenbüttel
5. Duchess Luise of Brunswick-Wolfenbüttel
11. Duchess Antoinette of Brunswick-Wolfenbüttel
1. Wilhelmine of Prussia
12. Louis VIII, Landgrave of Hesse-Darmstadt
6. Louis IX, Landgrave of Hesse-Darmstadt
13. Countess Charlotte of Hanau-Lichtenberg
3. Princess Frederica Louisa of Hesse-Darmstadt
14. Christian III, Count Palatine of Zweibrücken
7. Countess Palatine Caroline of Zweibrücken
15. Countess Caroline of Nassau-Saarbrücken

Wilhelmine of Prussia, Queen of the Netherlands House of Hohenzollern Born: 18 November 1774 Died: 12 October 1837
Royal titles
Vacant Title last held by Hortense de Beauharnais as Queen of Holland	Queen consort of the Netherlands; Grand Duchess consort of Luxembourg; 1815–1837	Vacant Title next held by Anna Pavlovna of Russia
