= Pieter van der Hulst the Younger =

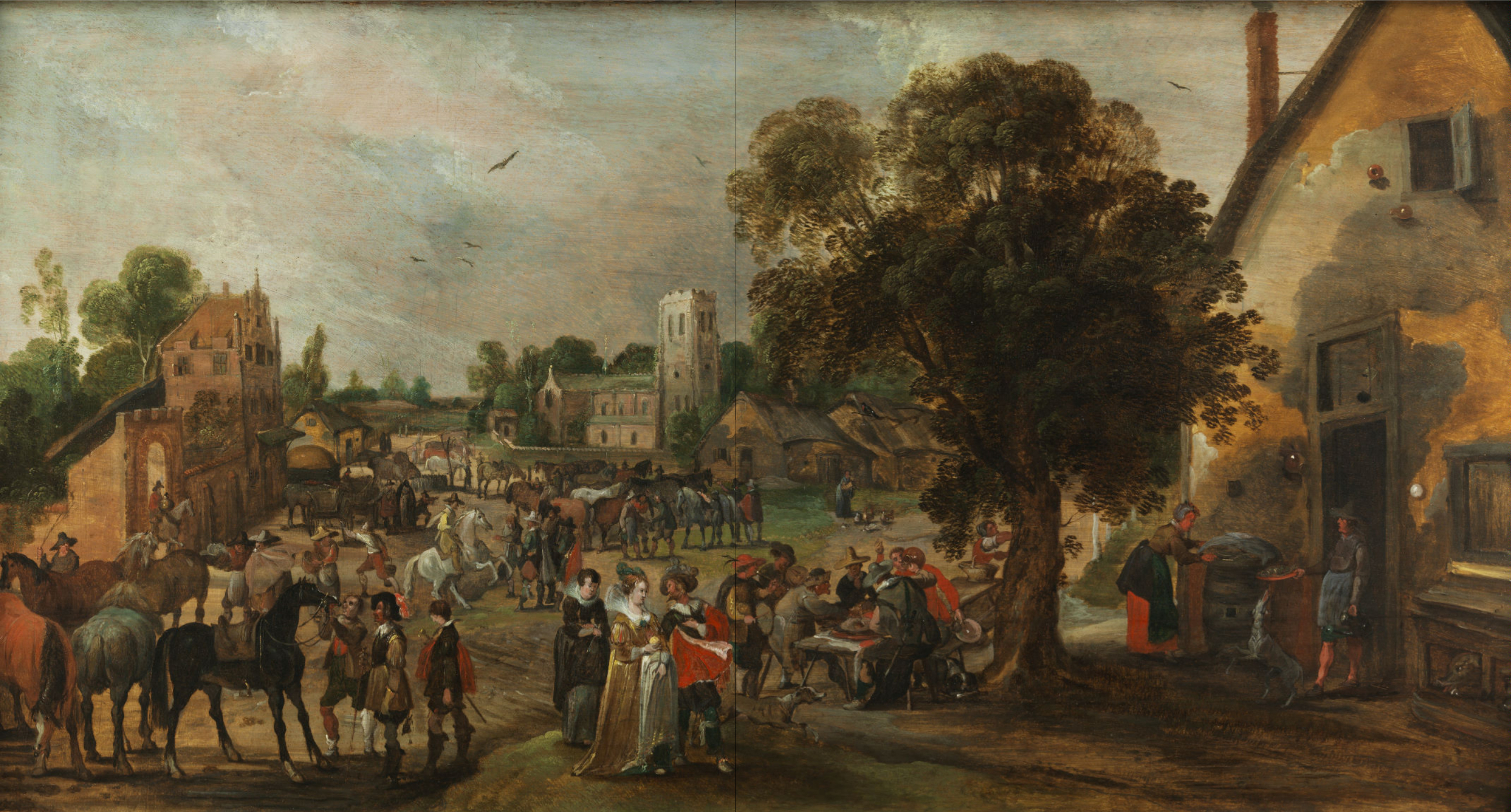
Horse market in a village

Pieter van der Hulst the Younger or Pieter van der Hulst (II) (active from September 1623 to 1637) was a Flemish landscape and genre painter who was active in Antwerp. He was an assistant of Rubens for some time.

== Life ==
Very little is known about the life of Pieter van der Hulst the Younger. He was probably the son of Pieter van der Hulst the Elder. He is recorded in the records of the Antwerp Guild of Saint Luke from 1623 to 1637. He became a master in the Guild in 1623. Francois Coeschot became his pupil in the guild year 1625 to 1626.

From 1631 to 1637 he is regularly mentioned in the lists of the members of the Violieren, the Antwerp Chamber of rhetoric that was linked to the Guild of Saint Luke. He was for a while an assistant of Rubens.

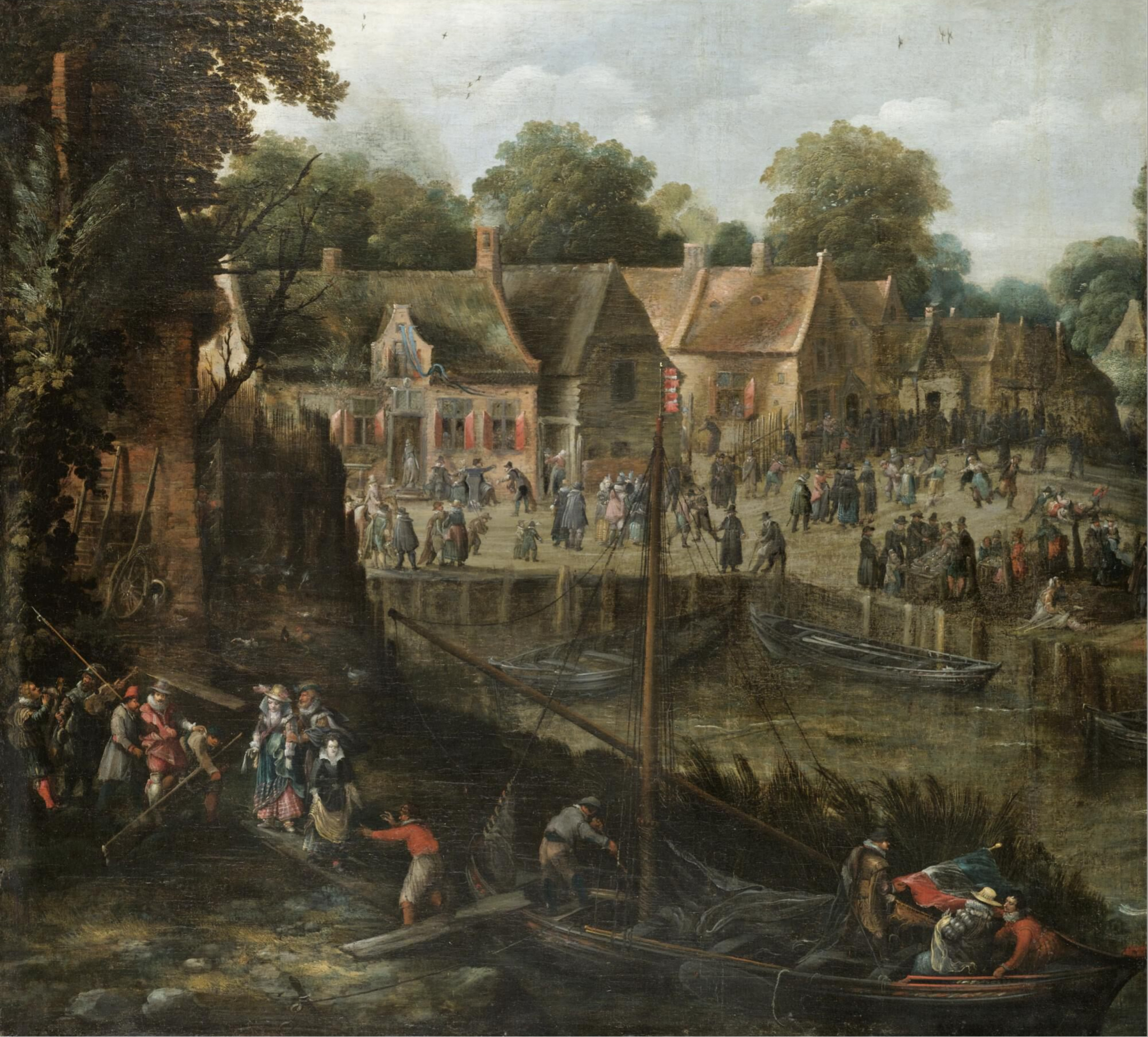
Village kermesse with elegant figures entering boats

A Pieter van der Hulst (III) became master of the Antwerp Guild of Saint Luke in 1647/1648. He may have been the son of Pieter II.

== Work ==
Van der Hulst was a painter of landscapes and genre scenes of peasant life. It is not always possible to attribute works signed with the name Pieter van der Hulst or the monogram PVH to him or his presumed father Pieter the Elder as they dealt with similar subjects in a similar style.

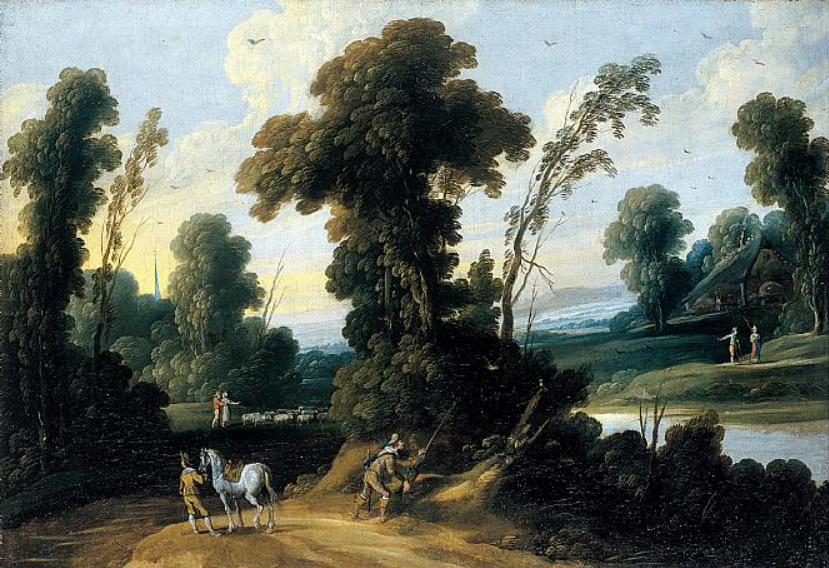
Landscape with travelers and a shepherd with his flock

The painting of a Kermesse in a village in the Herzog Anton Ulrich Museum, Braunschweig museum, signed and dated "P.V. Hulst, 1628", is usually attributed to him. It is a typical peasant market and festival scene which is similar to those painted by his father and traces back to the peasant genre developed in Flemish art in the 16th century by the painter Pieter Brueghel the Elder.

A set of six landscapes with figures has been attributed to the artist. It shows people engaged in various types of activities ranging from hunting to gallant scenes as well as soldiers at rest. These themes were very appreciated by the cultured and rich Antwerp patrons of that time. The landscapes are rendered in a very natural and immediate manner, with attention to some details which can draw in the attention of the viewer.

Van der Hulst has been identified with a certain Verhulst, assistant of Rubens and landscape painter, who collaborated on the painting View of the Escorial, sold to king Charles I of England in 1640 (Longford Castle (Bodenham), private collection). In a letter written to Balthazar Gerbier, who was tasked by Charles I to acquire the painting, Rubens explains the history of the painting. Rubens recounts that he visited the hills around the Escorial with the Spanish painter Velazquez in 1628. He used the occasion to draw a sketch of the landscape. This sketch was the basis for a painting by Pieter van der Hulst. In his letter, Rubens calls van der Hulst 'a very mediocre painter of this city' who made the painting 'according to his abilities' pursuant to Rubens' instructions.
