= Nieuwe Kerk (Delft) =

Protestant church in Delft, Netherlands

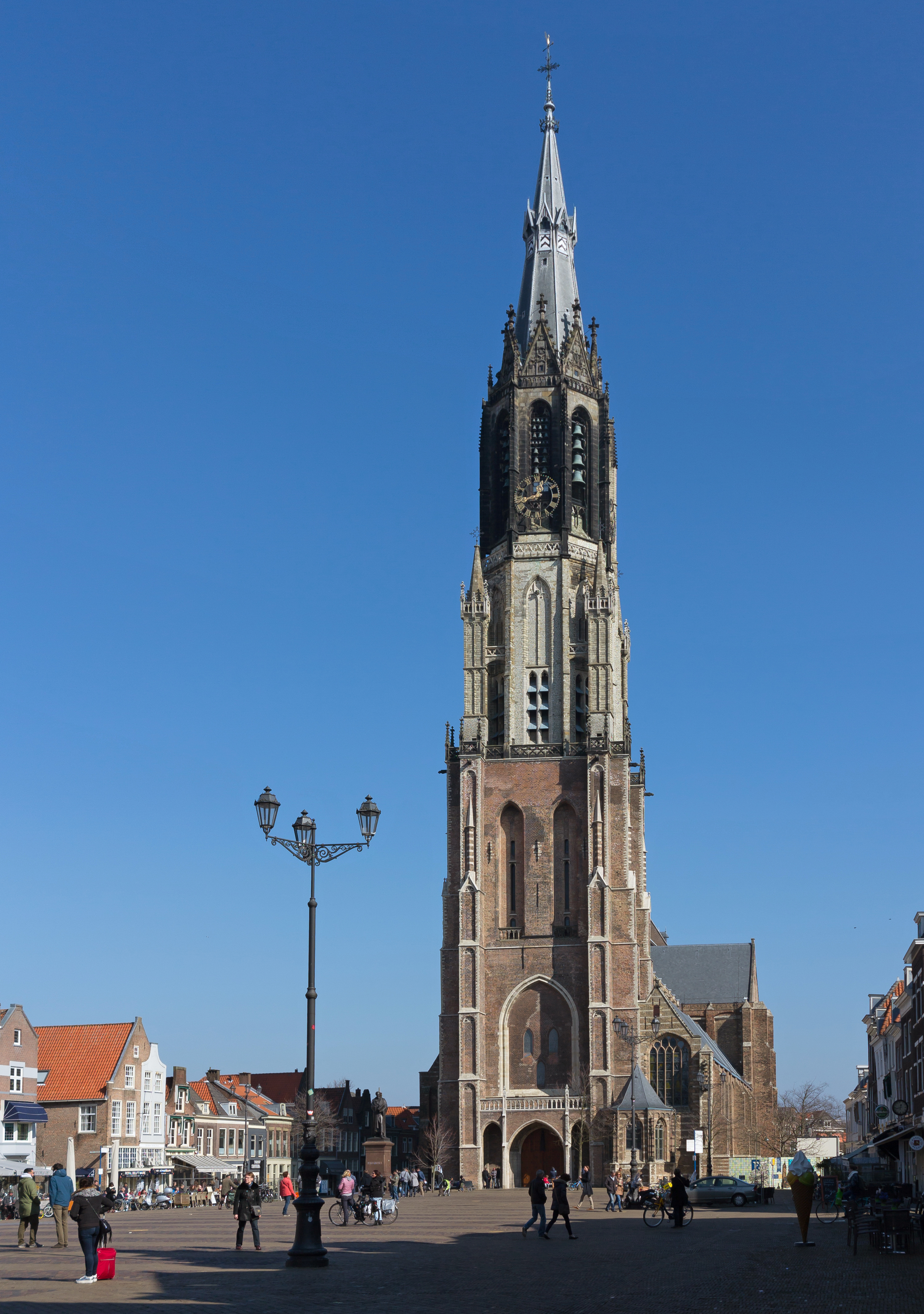
- Nieuwe Kerk, Delft
- Nieuwe Kerk
- 52.0123°N 4.3609°E
- Location: Delft, Netherlands
- Denomination: Protestant Church in the Netherlands
- Previous denomination: Roman Catholic

Architecture
- Designated: Dutch rijksmonument #11872
- Architectural type: Church tower
- Style: Gothic
- Groundbreaking: 1396
- Completed: 1496

Specifications
- Height: 108.75 m (356.79 ft)

The Nieuwe Kerk (Dutch pronunciation: [ˈniu.ə ˈkɛr(ə)k]; English: New Church) is a Protestant church in the city of Delft in the Netherlands. The building is located on Delft Market Square (Markt), opposite to the City Hall (Dutch: Stadhuis). In 1584, William the Silent was entombed there in a mausoleum designed by Hendrick and Pieter de Keyser. Since then, members of the House of Orange-Nassau have been entombed in the royal crypt. The latest members to have been entombed are Queen Juliana and her husband Prince Bernhard in 2004. The private royal family crypt is not open to the public. The church tower, with the most recent recreation of the spire, was designed by Pierre Cuypers and completed in 1872. It is the second highest in the Netherlands, after the Domtoren in Utrecht.

== History ==
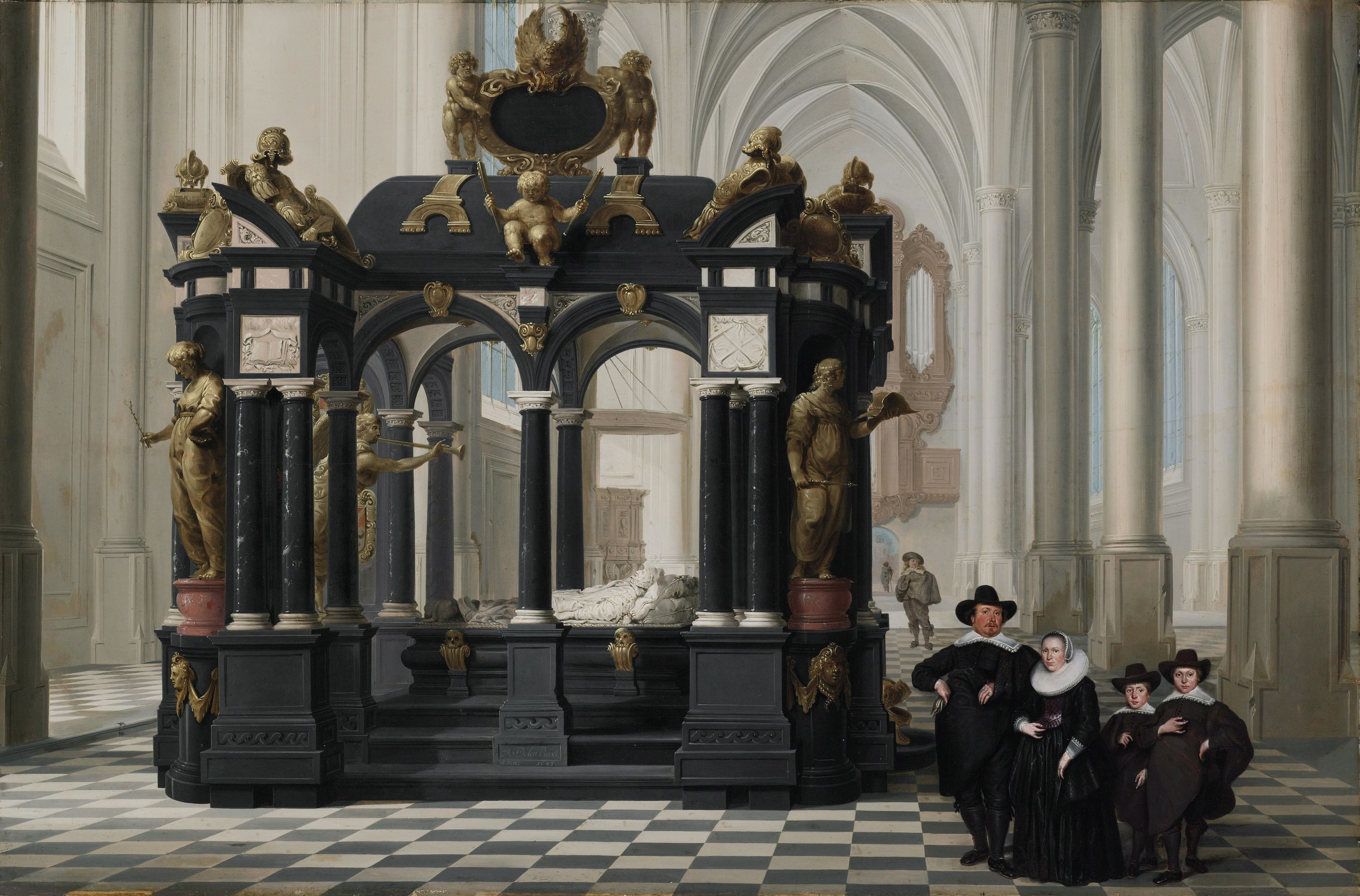
Family in the Nieuwe Kerk with the monument of Willem the Silent by Dirk van Delen, 1645

The New Church, formerly the church of St Ursula (14th century), is the burial place of the princes of Orange. The church is characterised by a narrow tower and chime of bells, containing an allegorical monument of William the Silent. It was crafted by Hendrik de Keyser and his son Pieter in approximately 1621. The church also contains a tomb of Hugo Grotius, born in Delft in 1583, whose statue, erected in 1886, stands in the marketplace outside. Grotius's wife, Maria van Reigersberch, who had helped him escape in 1621 from his imprisonment at Loevestein Castle hidden in a book chest, is also buried there with her husband.

The tower of the church was built in 1396–1496 by Jacob van der Borch, who also built the Domtoren in Utrecht during the years 1444–1475. The monument for Hugo de Groot was made in 1781. The mechanical clock has 18 bells, made by Francois Hemony from 1659. The church tower contains a bell from 1662 made by Francois Hemony with a diameter of 104 centimetres. In the tower there are also bells no longer in use, including 13 from 1659 by Francois Hemony, three from 1678 by Pieter Hemony, three from 1750 by Joris de Mery, and one from 1929 by Gillett and Johnston.

In the Delft Thunderclap of 1645, 30 t (29.5 long tons; 33.1 short tons) of gunpowder detonated, destroying much of the city. The explosion blew the roof off and destroyed the church's stained-glass windows.

The Kerk appears in the Golden-Age painting by Carel Fabritius, A View of Delft. In 1586, Flemish scientist Simon Stevin used the church's tower to conduct an experiment on gravitational forces.

== Gallery ==
Views of Delft and the Nieuwe Kerk
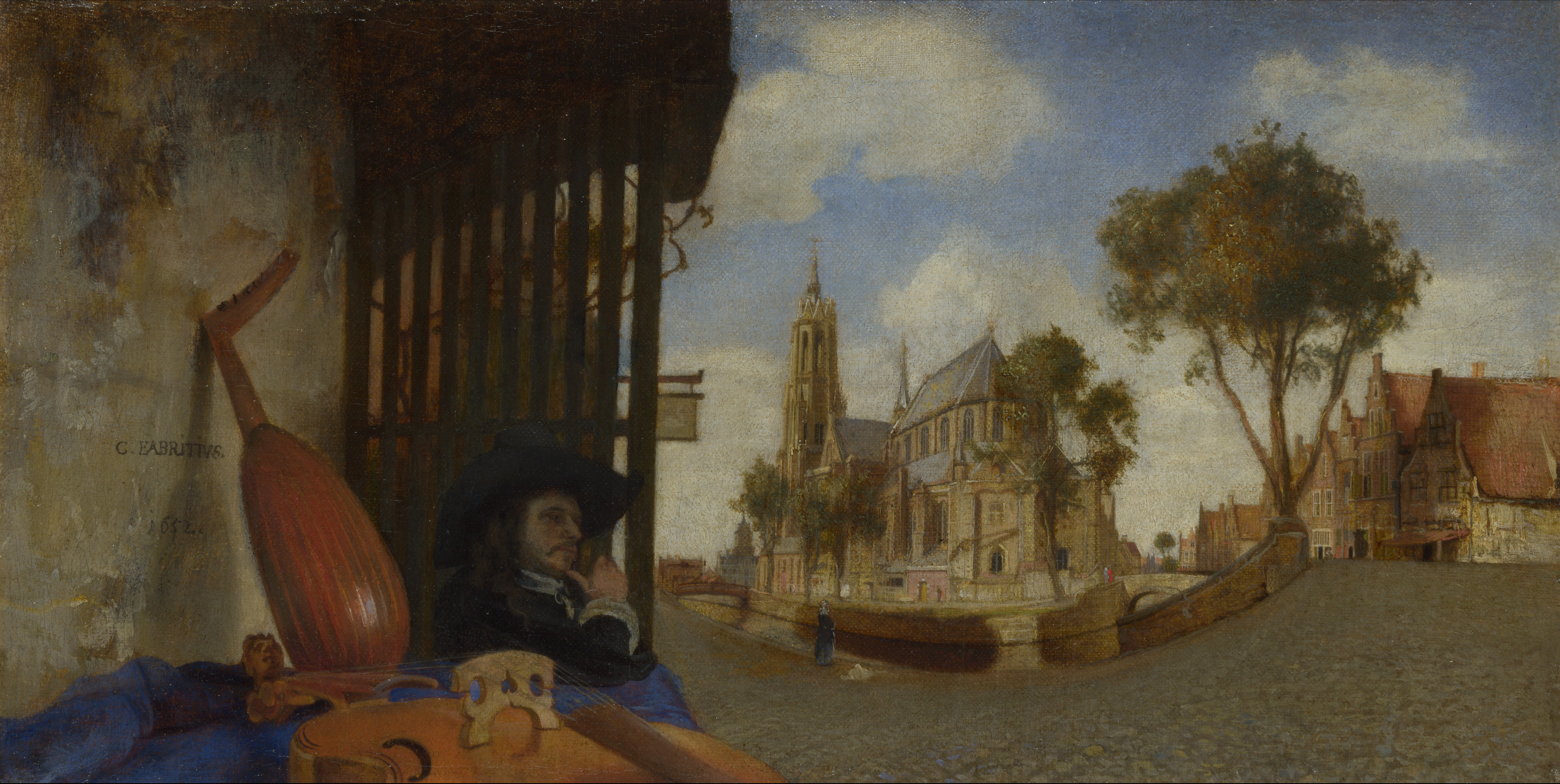
A View of Delft, a 1652 painting by Carel Fabritius

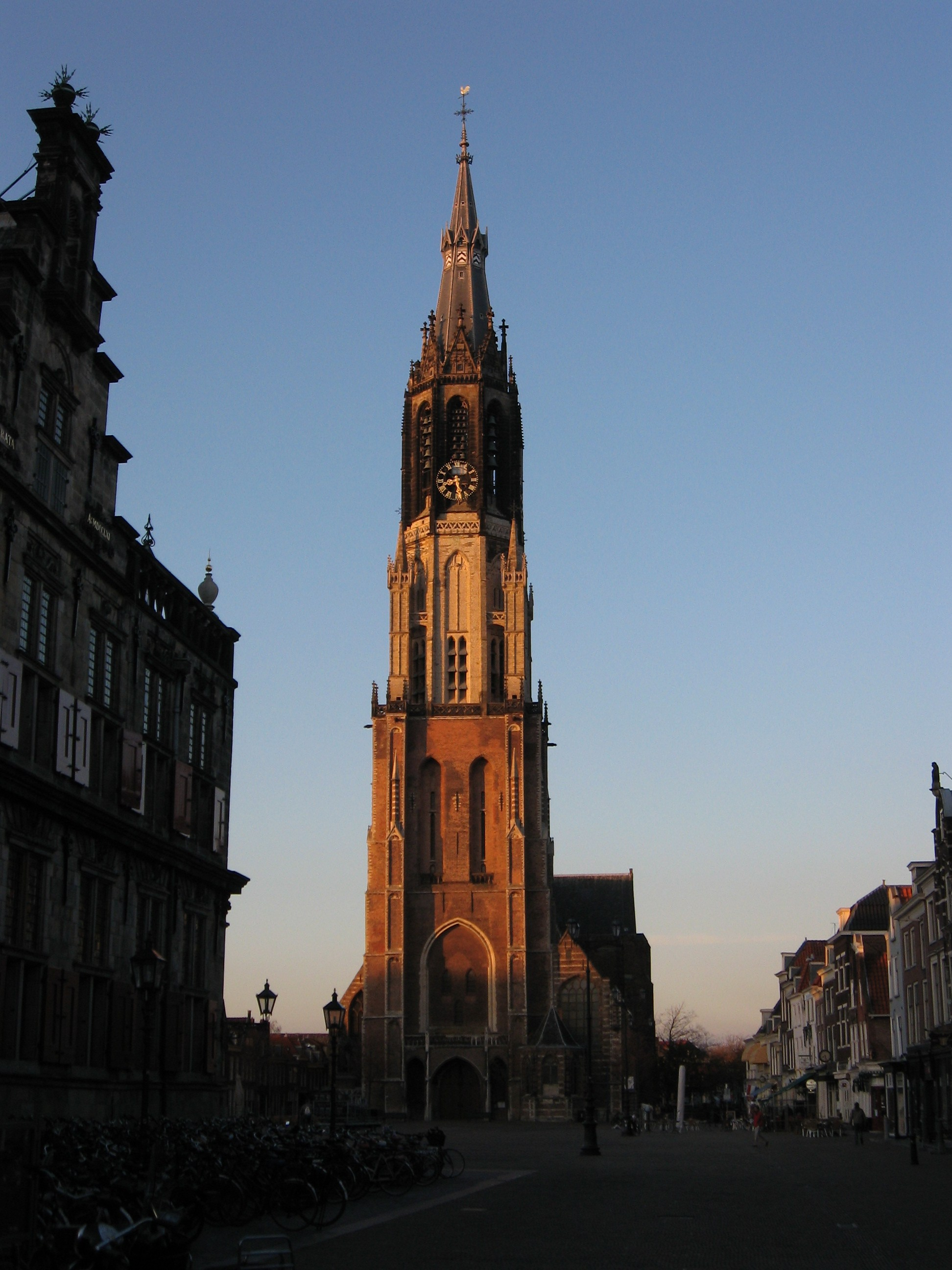
The church in the evening sun

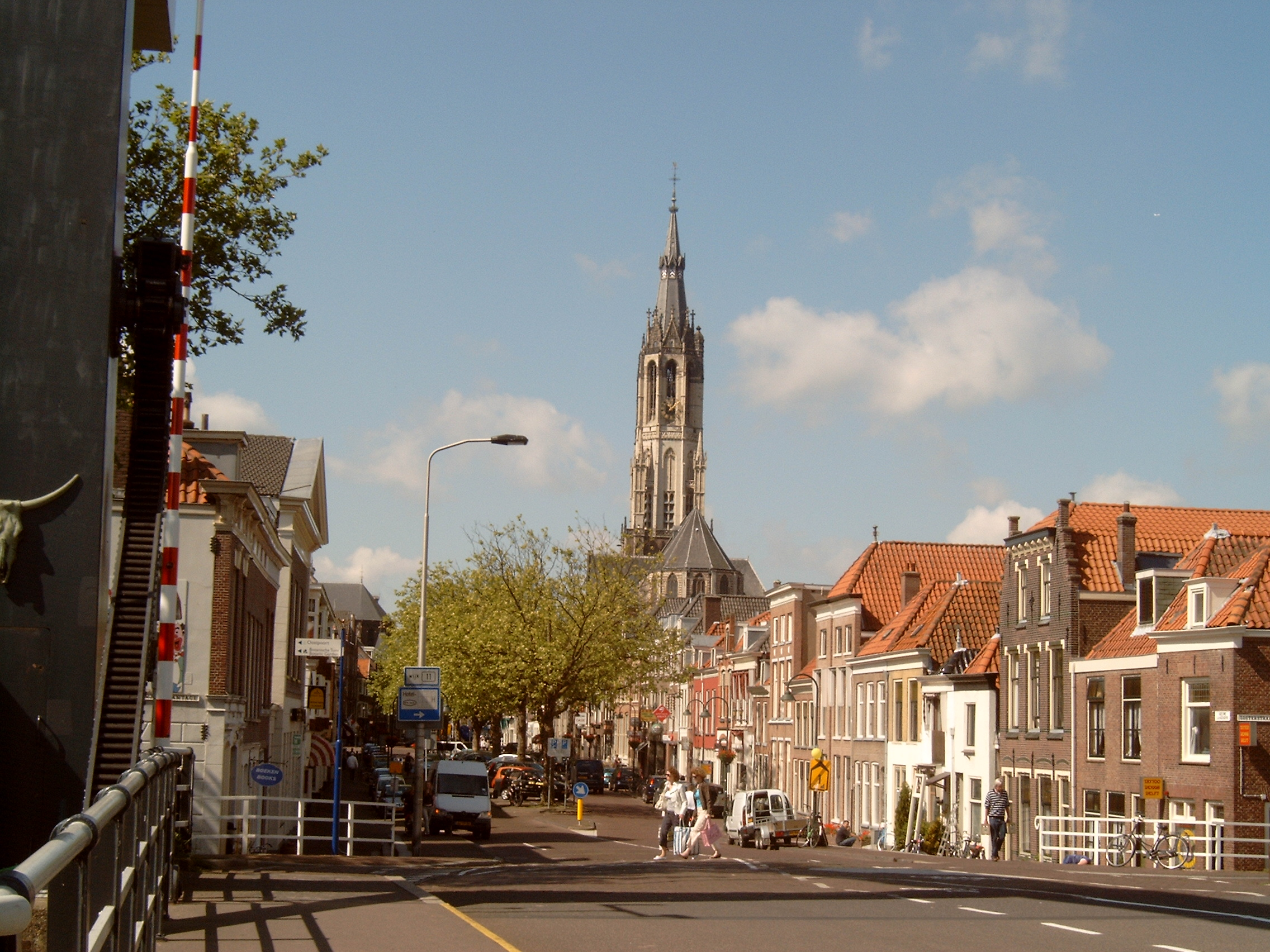
Nieuwe Kerk from Koepoortbrug

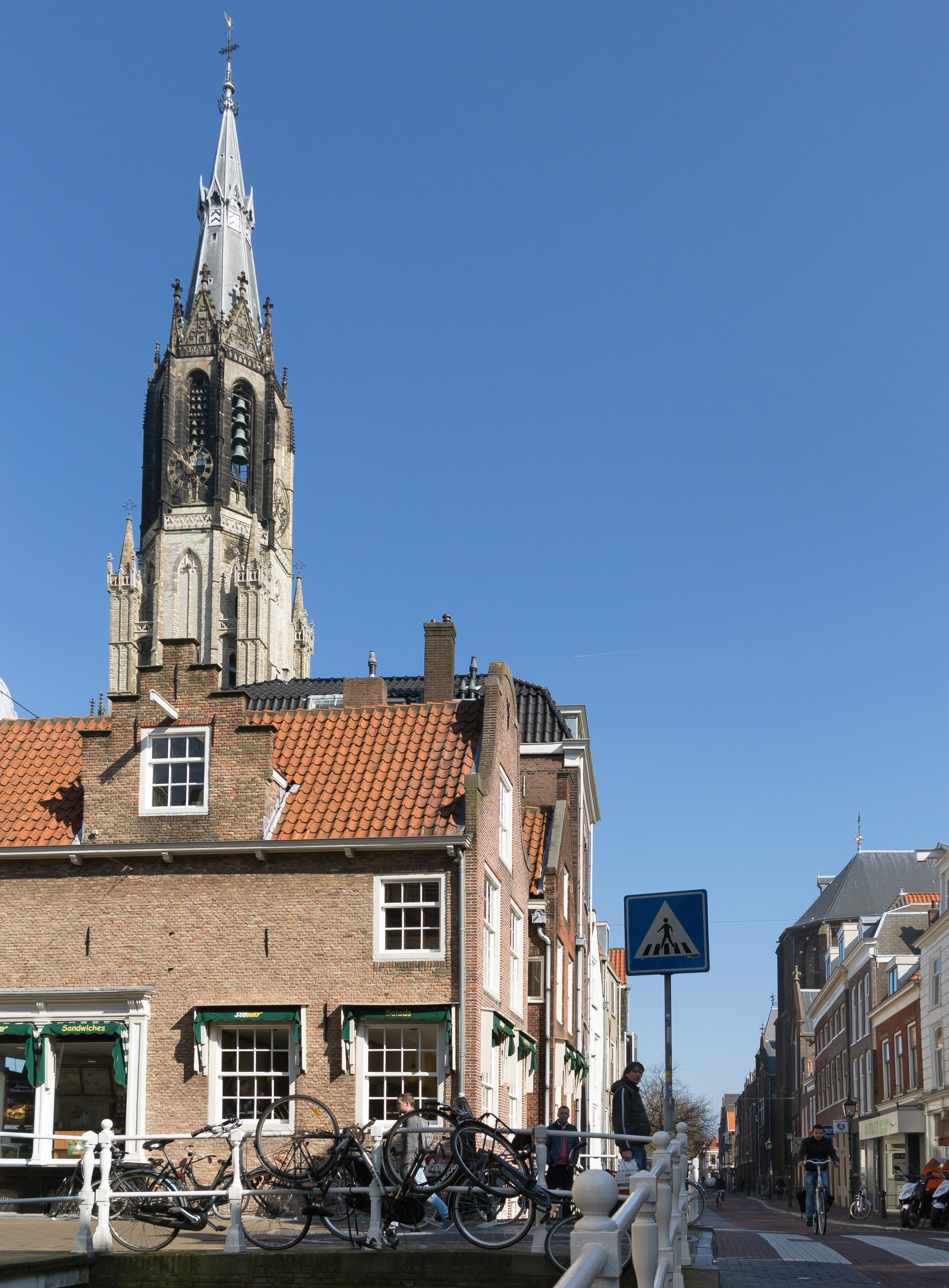
Nieuwe Kerk in street view

== Recent discoveries ==
In September 2021, archaeologists announced that the remains of around 200 people had been discovered during the expansion of the royal burial chamber in the Nieuwe Kerk.

== People buried in the royal crypt ==
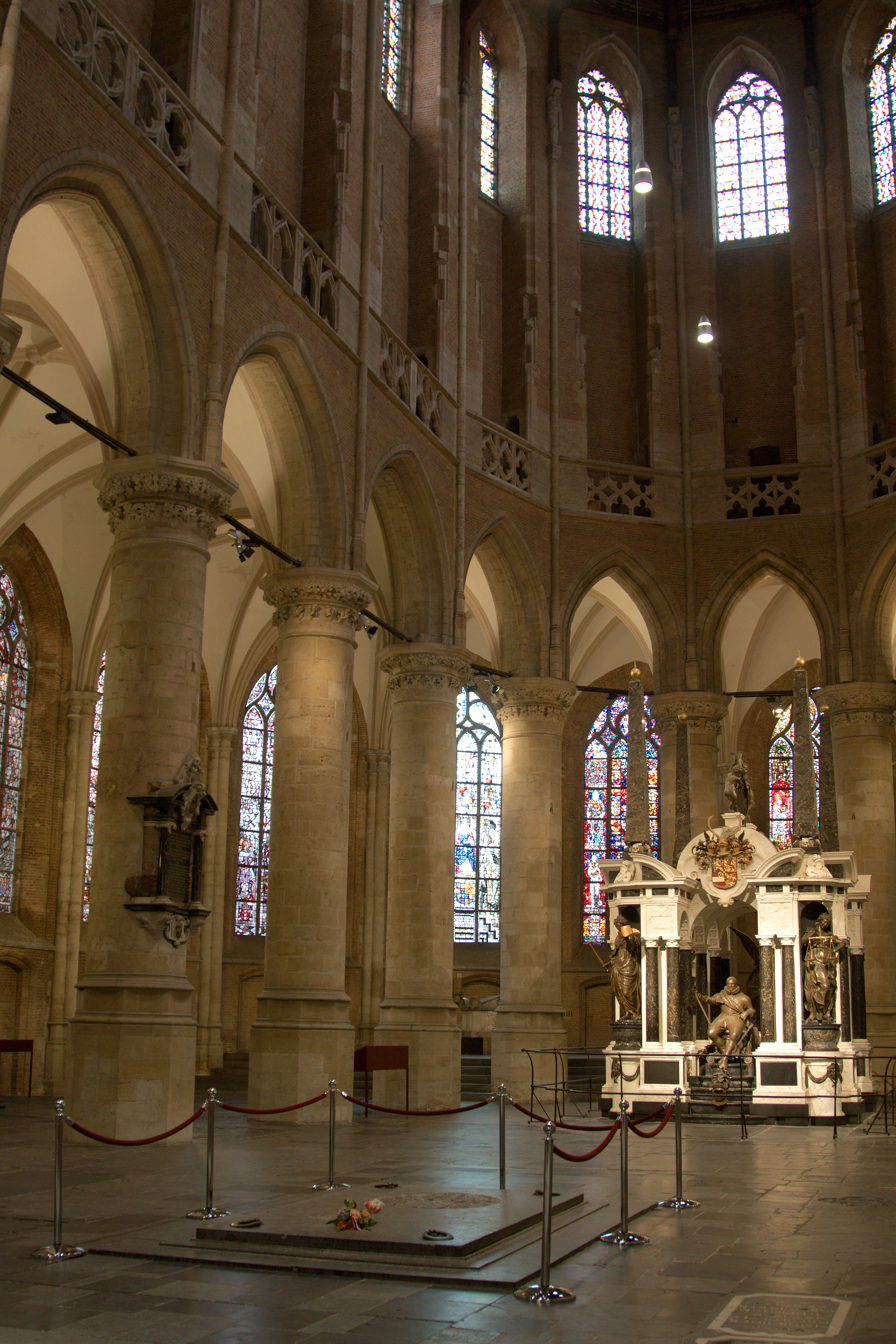
Cenotaph for William the Silent and access to the royal crypt

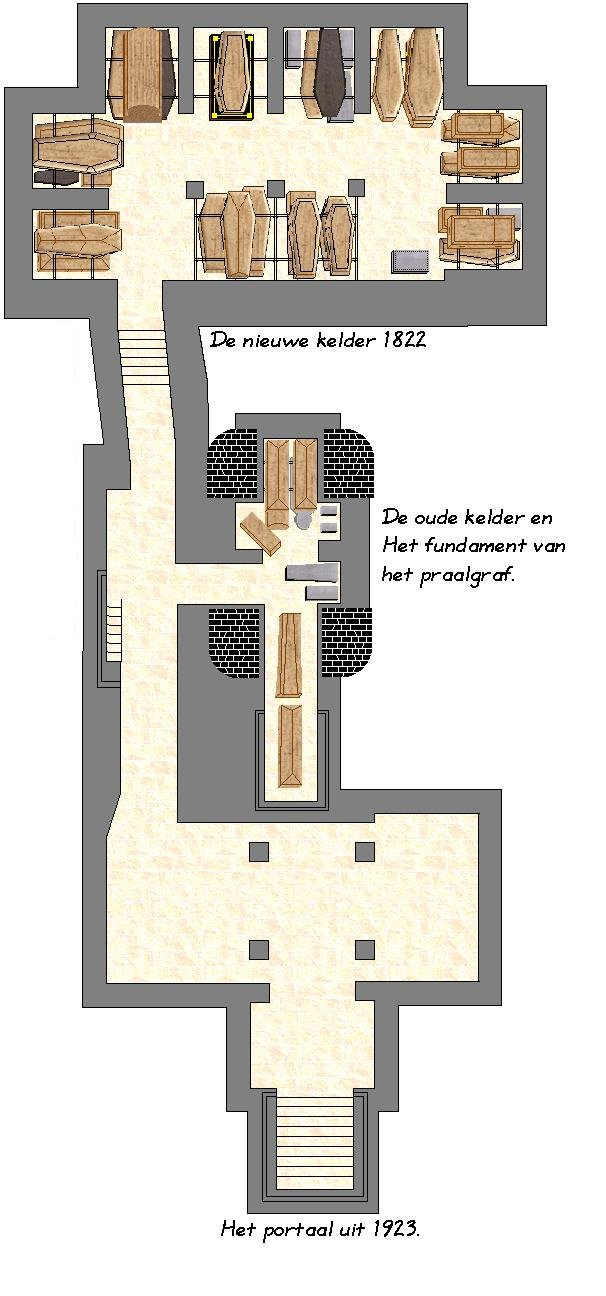
Plan of the royal crypt, prior to the 2022 expansion

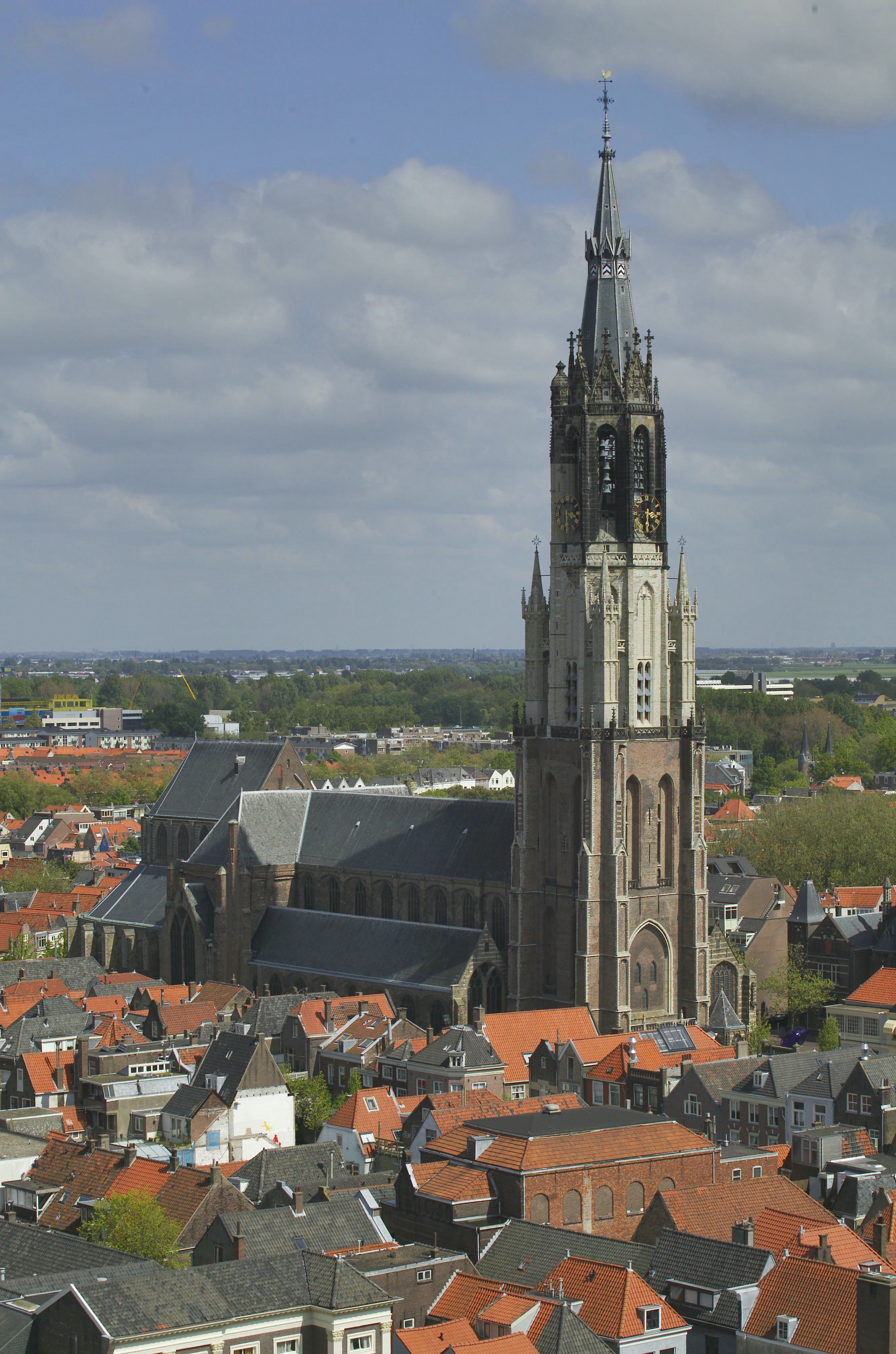
The Nieuwe Kerk seen from the Oude Kerk

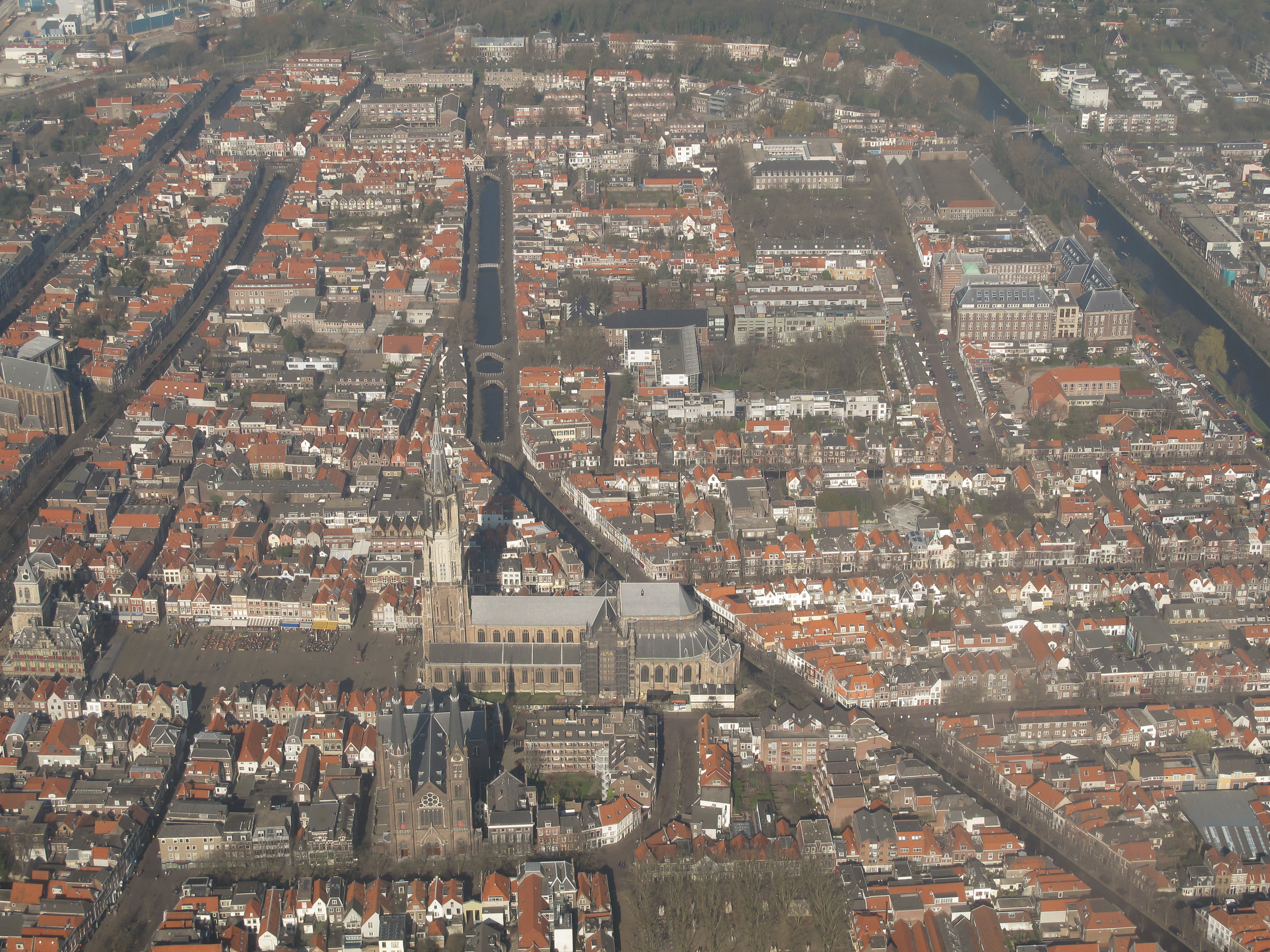
The Nieuwe Kerk from above

Eleven people are buried in the old vault:

- William the Silent (1584)
- Louise de Coligny (1621)
- Maurice of Nassau, Prince of Orange (1625)
- Elisabeth, daughter of Frederick Henry, Prince of Orange (1630)
- Isabella Charlotte, daughter of Frederick Henry, Prince of Orange (1642)
- Frederick Henry, Prince of Orange (1647)
- Countess Catharina Belgica of Nassau (1648)
- Amalia of Solms-Braunfels (1675)
- Three unidentified bodies.

35 people are buried in the new vault:

- William II, Prince of Orange (1651)
- Eldest stillborn daughter of William IV, Prince of Orange (1736)
- William IV, Prince of Orange (1751)
- Anne, Princess Royal and Princess of Orange (1759)
- George Willem Belgicus, son of Princess Carolina of Orange-Nassau (1762)
- A stillborn child of Princess Carolina of Orange-Nassau (1767)
- Eldest stillborn son of William V, Prince of Orange (1769)
- Willem Georg Frederik, son of William V, Prince of Orange (1896)
- Princess Pauline of Orange-Nassau (1806)
- William V, Prince of Orange (1806)
- Frederika Louise Wilhelmina, daughter of William V, Prince of Orange (1819)
- Princess Wilhelmina of Prussia (1822)
- Prince Ernest Casimir of the Netherlands (1860)
- Willem Frederik Nicolaas Karel, son of Prince Frederick of the Netherlands (1834)
- Wilhelmine of Prussia (1837)
- William I of the Netherlands (1844)
- Willem Frederik Nicolaas Albert, son of Prince Frederick of the Netherlands (1846)
- Prince Alexander of the Netherlands (1848)
- William II of the Netherlands (1849)
- Prince Maurice of the Netherlands (1850)
- Anna Pavlovna of Russia (1865)
- Princess Louise of Prussia (1870)
- Amalia of Saxe-Weimar-Eisenach (1872)
- Sophie of Württemberg (1877)
- Prince Henry of the Netherlands (1879)
- William, Prince of Orange (1879)
- Prince Frederick of the Netherlands (1881)
- Alexander, Prince of Orange (1884)
- William III of the Netherlands (1890)
- Emma of Waldeck and Pyrmont (1934)
- Prince Hendrik of the Netherlands (1934)
- Wilhelmina of the Netherlands (1962)
- Prince Claus of the Netherlands (2002)
- Juliana of the Netherlands (2004)
- Prince Bernhard of Lippe-Biesterfeld (2004)

William III, Prince of Orange, is not buried in the royal crypt but in Westminster Abbey in the United Kingdom due to his position as King of England at the time of his death.

== See also ==
- List of tallest structures built before the 20th century
