= Alexander, Prince of Orange =

Dutch prince (1851–1884)

Alexander
- Prince of Orange
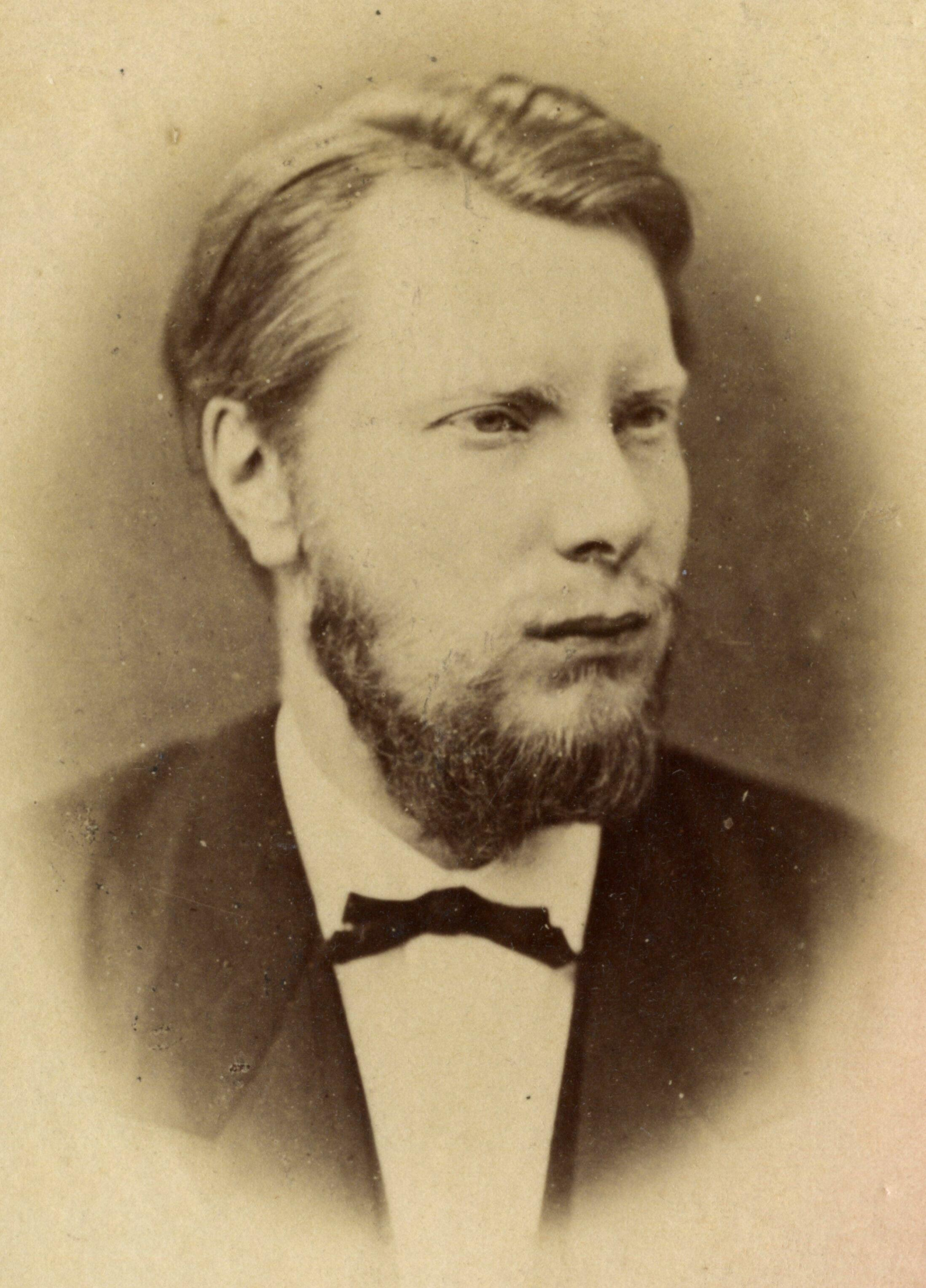
- Prince Alexander, c. 1880
- Born: 25 August 1851; Noordeinde Palace, The Hague, Netherlands
- Died: 21 June 1884 (aged 32); The Hague, Netherlands
- Burial: 17 July 1884; Nieuwe Kerk, Delft, Netherlands
Names
- Willem Alexander Karel Hendrik Frederik
- House: Orange-Nassau
- Father: William III of the Netherlands
- Mother: Sophie of Württemberg

Alexander, Prince of Orange (Willem Alexander Karel Hendrik Frederik; 25 August 1851 – 21 June 1884), was heir apparent to his father King William III of the Netherlands from 11 June 1879 until his death.

For a span of 116 years, from the birth of Alexander (1851) until the birth of the present king Willem-Alexander (1967), no male heirs were born into the Dutch Royal House.

== Life ==
Prince Alexander of the Netherlands was born in The Hague on 25 August 1851. He was the third child of King William III and Queen Sophie. His second brother, Prince Maurice had died the previous year. Unlike his brother William, the heir-apparent, he was disciplined, intellectual and well-read. His mother, Queen Sophie died in 1877. After Prince William's death two years later on 11 June 1879, he became heir apparent to the Dutch throne and as such the Prince of Orange.

Alexander held the position of heir apparent until his own death, at age 32, on 21 June 1884 in The Hague from typhus. Although he never married, negotiations were held for him to marry, firstly Princess Thyra of Denmark, and supposedly secondly the Infanta Marie Anne of Portugal. He was buried in the new royal burial vault in the Nieuwe Kerk in Delft on 17 July 1884. After his death, his half-sister, the future Queen Wilhelmina, became heir presumptive to the Dutch throne. Alexander's death meant that on the death of William III the Grand Duchy of Luxembourg came into the hands of Duke Adolphus from the Walram line of the House of Nassau, as under the terms of the house-treaty a princess could not succeed to that title.

Prince Alexander was Grand Master of the Grand Orient of the Netherlands.

== Honours ==
- Netherlands: Grand Cross of the Order of the Netherlands Lion, 1861
- Luxembourg: Grand Cross of the Order of the Oak Crown, 1861
- Württemberg: Grand Cross of the Order of the Württemberg Crown, 1869
- Saxe-Weimar-Eisenach: Grand Cross of the Order of the White Falcon, 1873
- Denmark: Knight of the Order of the Elephant, 4 July 1874
- (Austrian Empire) (Kingdom of Hungary) Austria-Hungary: Grand Cross of the Royal Hungarian Order of Saint Stephen, 1874
- Kingdom of Prussia: Knight of the Order of the Black Eagle, 4 December 1874
- Kingdom of Hawaii: Grand Cross of the Order of Kamehameha I, 1881

Alexander, Prince of Orange House of Orange-Nassau Born: 25 August 1851 Died: 21 June 1884
Dutch royalty
Preceded by Willem	Prince of Orange; 1879–1884	Vacant Title next held by Willem-Alexander
Masonic offices
Preceded by Prince Frederick of the Netherlands	Grand Master of the Grand Orient of the Netherlands; 1882–1884	Succeeded by Pieter Johannes Gesinus van Diggelen
