= Sophie of Württemberg =

Queen of the Netherlands from 1849 to 1877

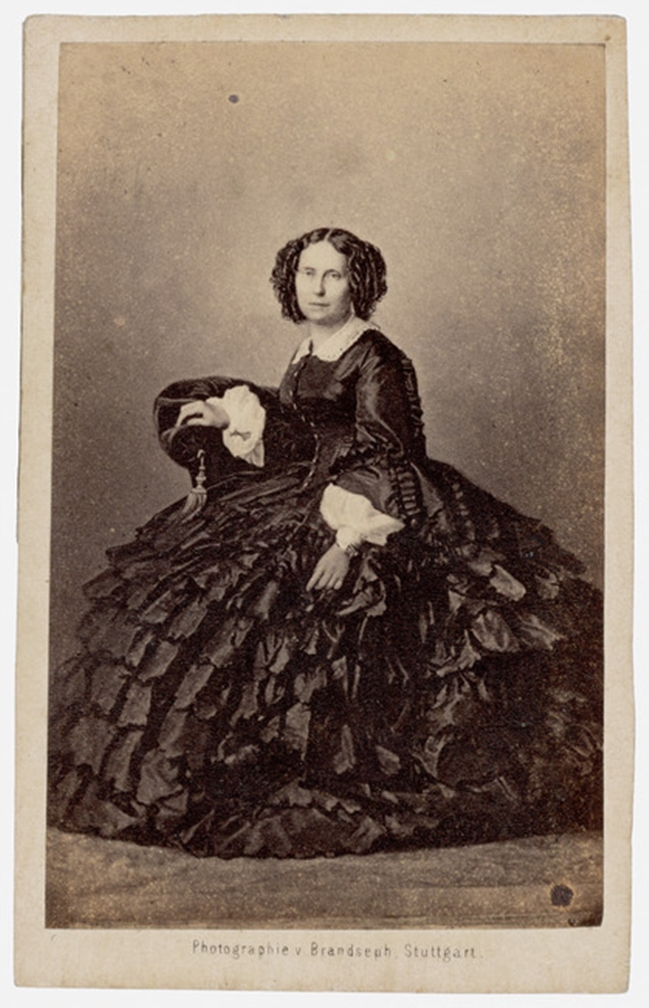
- Queen Sophie c. 1860

Queen consort of the Netherlands Grand Duchess consort of Luxembourg Duchess consort of Limburg
- Tenure: 17 March 1849 – 3 June 1877
- Born: 17 June 1818; Ludwigsburg Palace, Stuttgart, Württemberg
- Died: 3 June 1877 (aged 58); Huis ten Bosch, The Hague, Netherlands
- Burial: 20 June 1877; Nieuwe Kerk, Delft, Netherlands
- Spouse: William III of the Netherlands (m. 1839; sep. 1855)
- Issue: William, Prince of Orange; Prince Maurice; Alexander, Prince of Orange
Names
- Sophie Friederike Mathilde
- House: Württemberg
- Father: William I of Württemberg
- Mother: Catherine Pavlovna of Russia

Sophie of Württemberg (Sophie Friederike Mathilde; 17 June 1818 – 3 June 1877) was Queen of the Netherlands from his accession in 1849 until her death in 1877, as the first wife of King William III. Sophie separated from William in 1855 but continued to perform her duties as queen in public. She was known for her progressive and liberal views and corresponded with several famous intellectuals.

== Early life ==
Sophie was born in Ludwigsburg Palace, Stuttgart, to King William I of Württemberg and his wife and queen, Catherine Pavlovna of Russia, the fourth daughter of Tsar Paul I. Shortly after Sophie's birth, her mother died, and she was cared for by her aunt, Catharina of Württemberg. She was niece of tsars Alexander I and Nicholas I of Russia.

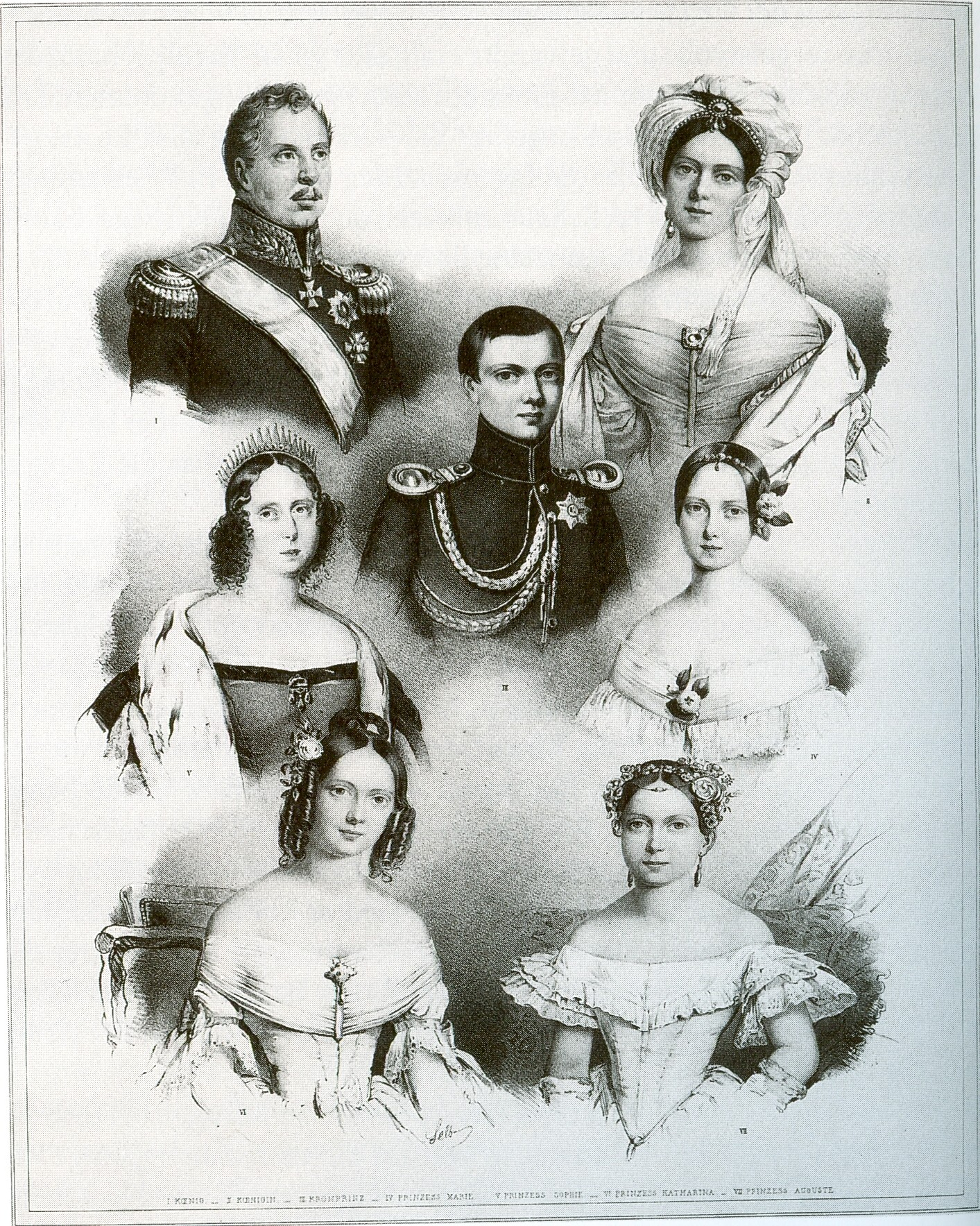
The family of King William I of Württemberg, featuring Princess Sophie (centre left)

She had a close relationship with her father and her sister Marie, but not with her stepmother, Pauline Therese. She was given a broad education by her father: after first being tutored in the common accomplishments by governesses customary for all upper-class girls of her time, she was additionally tutored by educated male tutors in history, geography and literature and acquainted with the works of Corneille, Racine, Kant and Hegel. When she was sixteen, she and her sister were taken by their father on an educational trip to Italy, which was otherwise customary for upper class males.

She was related to the Bonaparte family through her maternal aunt, and personally acquainted with both the future Napoleon III and Mathilde Bonaparte from her childhood, and corresponded with the latter her entire life. Through her progressive father, Sophie came in contact with liberal ideas from her early youth and supported democracy rather than royal absolutism.

== Crown princess ==
Sophie married her maternal first cousin, the future Prince of Orange (later King William III), in Stuttgart on 18 June 1839 with the idea that she would in the end succeed in dominating him, or so her mother-in-law Anna Pavlovna thought.

The marriage was arranged. Her father, while being a liberal progressive in other aspects, still favored dynastic marriages and wished for his daughters to marry monarchs. Prior to her marriage, King Otto of Greece and Duke William of Brunswick were possible suitors for Princess Sophie. The engagement with the first came to nothing because Princess Sophie's ambitious father had no confidence in the newly established Greek monarchy of Otto. Chance prevented a proposal by the second candidate because her father let it be known that Princess Sophie was already betrothed. Sophie herself had preferred to marry William of Brunswick, and she stated herself that her marriage to William of the Netherlands was a sacrifice she made for her father.

After the wedding, Sophie and William settled in the Paleis aan het Plein in The Hague. She came to have a good relationship with her father-in-law, William II of the Netherlands, as well as with her uncle-in-law Prince Frederick of the Netherlands. Sophie and her mother-in-law Anna, who was also her maternal aunt, were never on good terms. This was caused on Anna's side by her strong dislike for Sophie's mother. Sophie herself heartily disliked and heavily criticized most of her in-laws.

The marriage of Sophie and William was never a happy one. It was not improved by the birth of their children, whose upbringing was a constant cause of conflict between their parents. William was constantly unfaithful and disgusted Sophie with his boorish and violent behavior. Sophie humiliated William by showcasing her superior intellectual capacities for all to see. Their children, particularly the eldest, became pawns in the parental tug-of-war and eventually sided with their mother. Over time the relationship worsened further. Sophie did not wish to live with her husband and devoted herself to her children (as far as she was allowed), charity, cultivating her own intellectual interests and the private study of various subjects. A divorce was contemplated early on, but was continually postponed because it was not seen as suitable for a king and queen.

== Queen consort ==
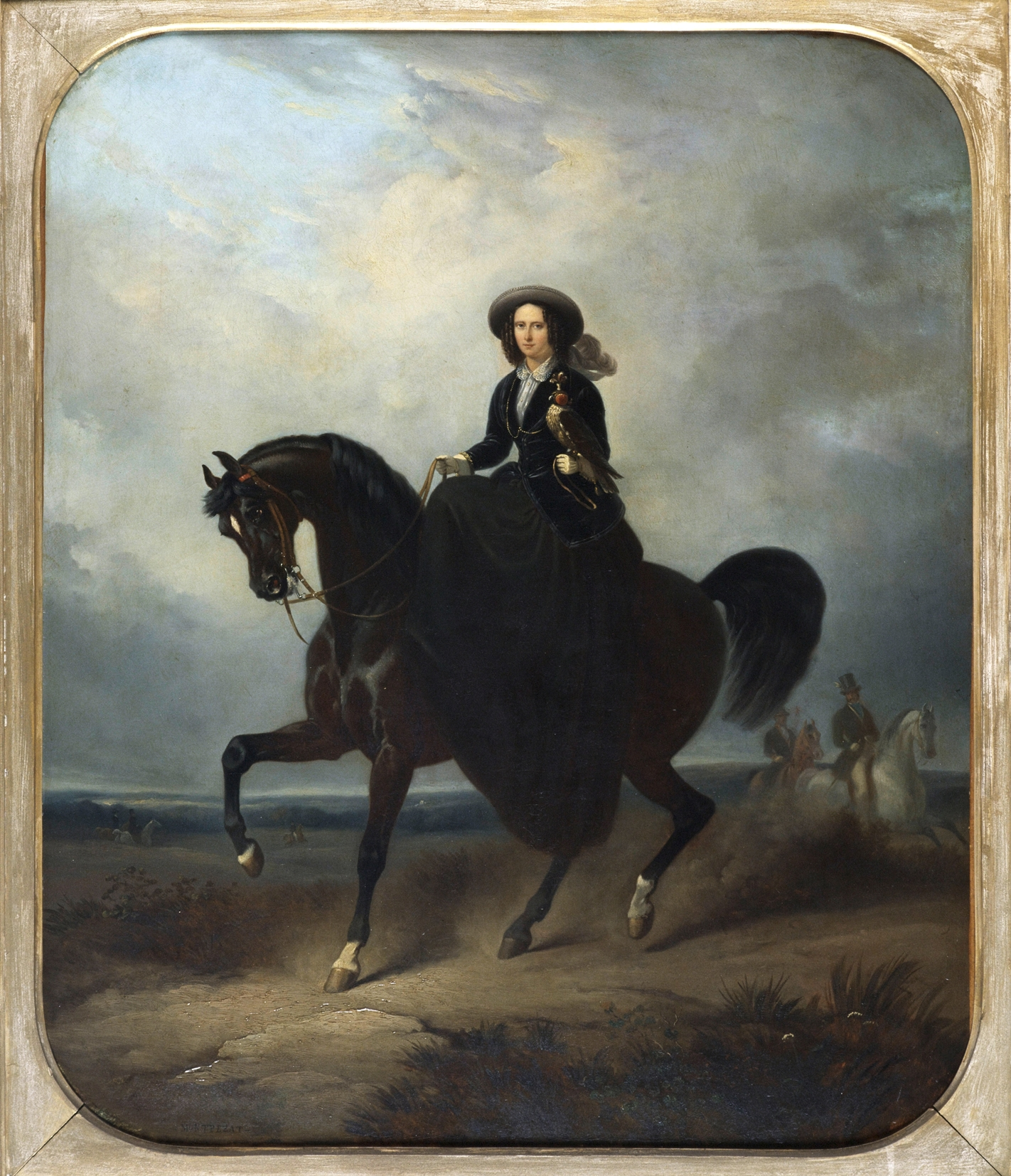
Equestrian portrait of the Queen riding a horse in side saddle by Henri Auguste d'Ainecy Montpezat, 1849

On 17 March 1849, King William II suddenly died. William III and Sophie became king and queen of the Netherlands, being inaugurated on 12 May 1849. They settled in the Noordeinde Palace in The Hague.

The relationship between Sophie and William did not improve after they became king and queen, and they continued to be in a state of constant conflict. Their son Maurice died in 1850 after both parents had hired a different physician since they could not agree on how his illness should be treated. When Sophie was pregnant with their third son, Alexander (1851–1884), William had their eldest son sent to boarding school despite Sophie's opposition.

Intellectually, Queen Sophie was superior to her husband. She, on the other hand, did not fit his sensual character. While he loved contemporary painting, music and theatre, she had a specific interest in history and science. William III had several extramarital relations. She let it be publicly known that she found him inferior and unsuitable to be king, and that she would do better as a regent for her son.

== Separation ==
The discussions of divorce continued after they became king and queen. Both Sophie and William mutually wished to have a divorce, but a divorce was seen as an impossible scandal because of their position. By the mediation of Prince Frederick of the Netherlands, a formal separation without divorce was finalized in 1855, and it was decided that the couple was to remain formally married in public, but allowed to live separate lives in practice. William was to be given full right to decide about the upbringing of their eldest son, while Sophie was given full custody of their youngest, Alexander. Sophie was to fulfill her representational duties as queen in public, but allowed to live her private life as she wished.

From 1855, the couple lived separately during the summer season, he at Het Loo Palace and she at Huis ten Bosch Palace. She also spent time in Stuttgart, with her own family. She engaged in a voluminous correspondence with various friends and intellectuals, as well as making trips and meeting them in person, among them Ernest Renan, Julius von Mohl, Leopold von Ranke and John Lothrop Motley, many of whom expressed admiration for her intellect. Sophie regularly visited her father, who remained her advisor and confidant until his death, after which he was succeeded by her friend George Villiers, the Earl of Clarendon, with whom she corresponded. She also enjoyed regular trips to France to visit Emperor Napoleon III and Empress Eugénie. During the Crimean War she sided against her Russian relatives with her friends Clarendon, Napoleon III and Queen Victoria. Aside from her interests in culture and science, she was also interested in spiritualism, and invited the medium Daniel Home to Noordeinde Palace in 1858 to hold a séance. Sophie participated in public debate and published an article in the famous Revue des Deux Mondes, in which she argued that the royal houses must keep up with the times.

== Final years and death ==
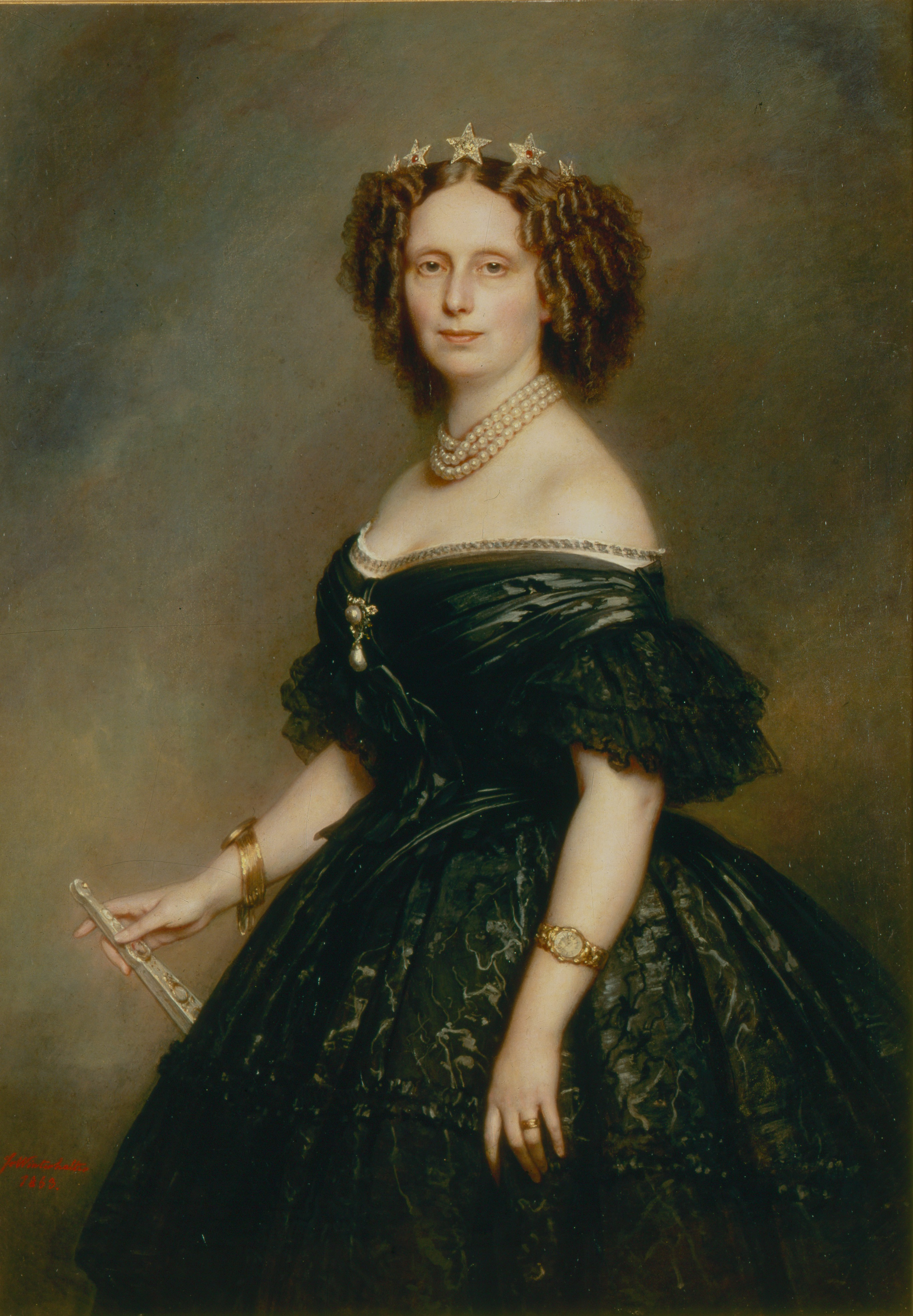
Portrait by Franz Xaver Winterhalter, 1861

Queen Sophie protected and stimulated the arts and supported several charities, including animal protection and the construction of public parks. As queen, she attended the industrial exhibitions from the 1860s and engaged in the education of the mentally challenged. She also supported the Society for the Protection of Animals by becoming its protector upon its foundation in 1867. Sophie also supported the women's movement when it first formed in the Netherlands, and became the protector of the first women's organization in 1871: Arbeid Adelt.

Sophie was an unusual queen with her political openness and scientific interests, as well as her relatively open-minded religious views. Her support for progressive development and disdain for proper etiquette earned her the sobriquet "La reine rouge" ('The Red Queen').

Sophie died at Huis ten Bosch Palace in The Hague. She was buried in her wedding dress because, in her view, her life had ended on the day she married.

== Issue ==
- Prince William (1840–1879), Prince of Orange from 1849 until 1879.
- Prince Maurice (1843–1850) died in childhood.
- Prince Alexander (1851–1884), Prince of Orange from 1879 until 1884.

== Ancestry ==
Ancestors of Sophie of Württemberg

8. Frederick II Eugene, Duke of Württemberg
4. Frederick I of Württemberg
9. Princess Friederike of Brandenburg-Schwedt
2. William I of Württemberg
10. Charles William Ferdinand, Duke of Brunswick
5. Duchess Auguste Karoline of Brunswick-Wolfenbüttel
11. Princess Augusta of Great Britain
1. Sophie of Württemberg
12. Peter III of Russia
6. Paul I of Russia
13. Catherine II of Russia
3. Grand Duchess Catherine Pavlovna of Russia
14. Frederick II Eugene, Duke of Württemberg (= 8)
7. Duchess Sophie Dorothea of Württemberg
15. Princess Friederike of Brandenburg-Schwedt (= 9)

== Honours ==
- Spain: Dame of the Order of Queen Maria Luisa, 2 March 1858
- Kingdom of Saxony: Dame of the Order of Sidonia, 1872

== Arms ==
Coat of arms of Queen Sophie of the Netherlands	Monogram of Queen Sophie of the Netherlands

Sophie of Württemberg House of Württemberg Born: 17 June 1818 Died: 3 June 1877
Royal titles
Preceded by Anna Pavlovna of Russia	Queen consort of the Netherlands; Grand Duchess consort of Luxembourg; 1849–1877	Vacant Title next held by Emma of Waldeck and Pyrmont
