= Prince Maurice of the Netherlands =

Dutch prince (1843–1850)

Prince Maurice
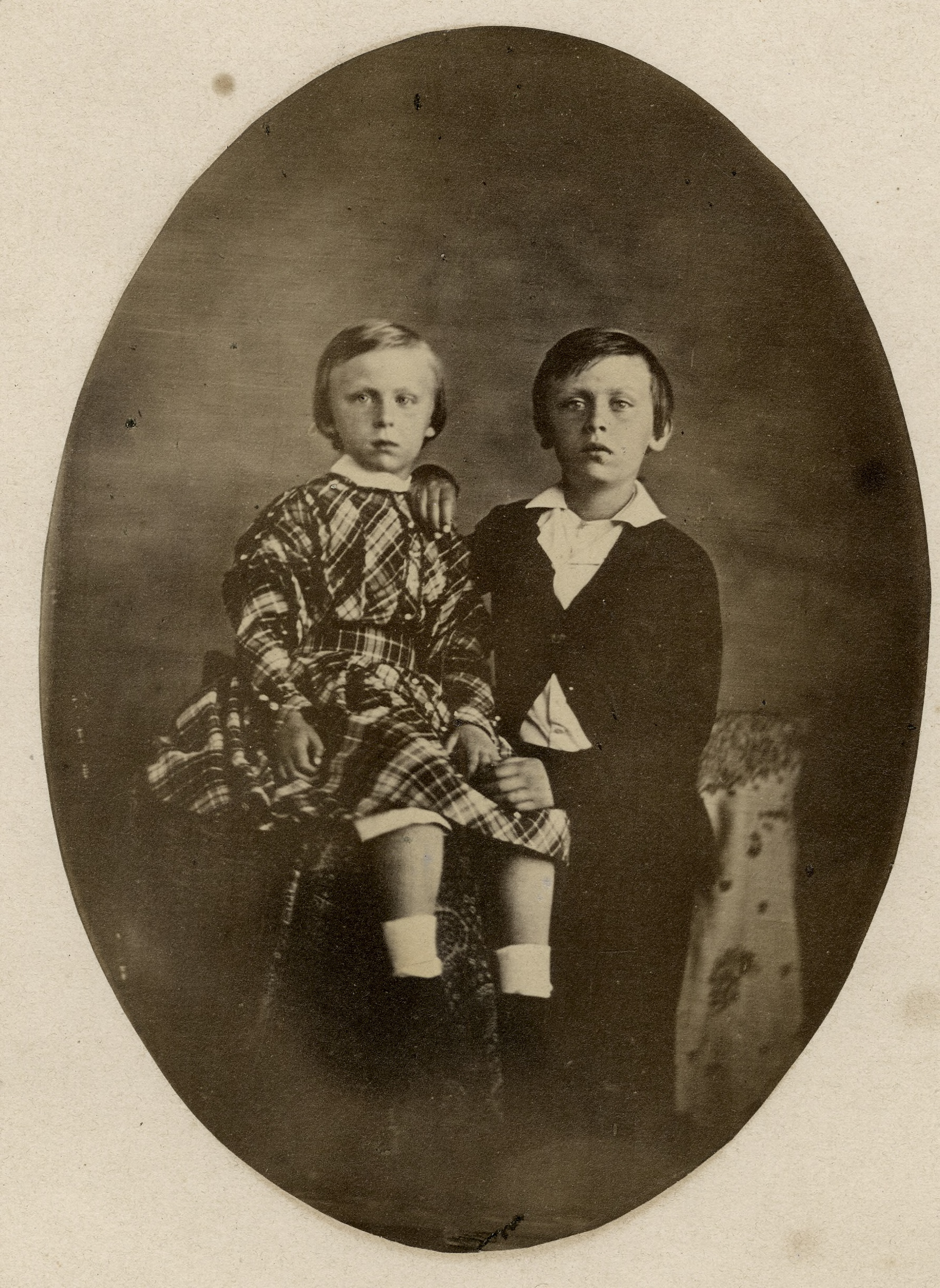
- Prince Maurice of the Netherlands (left) with his brother Prince William.
- Born: 15 September 1843; Paleis aan het Plein, The Hague, Netherlands
- Died: 4 June 1850 (aged 6); Noordeinde Palace, The Hague, Netherlands
- House: Orange-Nassau
- Father: William III of the Netherlands
- Mother: Sophie of Württemberg

Prince Maurice of the Netherlands, Prince of Orange-Nassau (Willem Frederik Maurits Alexander Hendrik Karel; 15 September 1843 – 4 June 1850), was the second son of King William III of the Netherlands and his first wife, Sophie of Württemberg.

== Early life and death ==
Maurice was born on 15 September 1843 at the royal apartments of William III and Sophie, Paleis aan het Plein in The Hague. A likeable child, he was easier to handle than his older brother William, but his mother constantly worried over his poor health. In 1850, when he was six years old, he fell ill once again. His mother did not want him to be treated by court physician Pierre Everard, in whose abilities she had little faith. The story has often been retold of how Queen Sophie wanted to consult another physician for a second opinion, which King William III refused, causing the child to die. This, however, is not what actually happened. William III left the decisions about his son's care to his wife. The physician Sophie chose, a doctor named Ter Winkel, diagnosed Prince Maurice with a "dirty stomach" and a cold. According to him, neither was cause for concern. The boy's governor, De Casembroot, was deeply concerned about his deteriorating condition and urged William III to take action, telling him that if his son died, the blame would be his as much as his wife's. When William reluctantly agreed to see Maurice, he was incensed at Ter Winkel's behaviour and expelled him from the room. By that time, Everard had been admitted to the boy's bedside, and it was already too late. Prince Maurice succumbed to meningitis on 4 June 1850.

His death hit his mother particularly hard. The embittered queen wrote to one of her friends:

My child is dead. I've closed my eyes myself. All that was left of hope and joy on this earth is gone forever... I hope I can die soon. Every day my misery increases. Every face I have to see is torture; I continuously envision the pointed face of my dying child, how he begged me to help him, when no help was possible...

Sophie took refuge in seances where she tried to contact the child she had lost. After Prince Maurice's death, she briefly reconciled with William III. However, by the time the couple's third son, Prince Alexander, was born in August 1851, the marriage had completely fallen apart. The King and Queen separated a couple of years later, although they kept up appearances in public and never formally divorced.
