= William III of the Netherlands =

King of the Netherlands from 1849 to 1890

William III
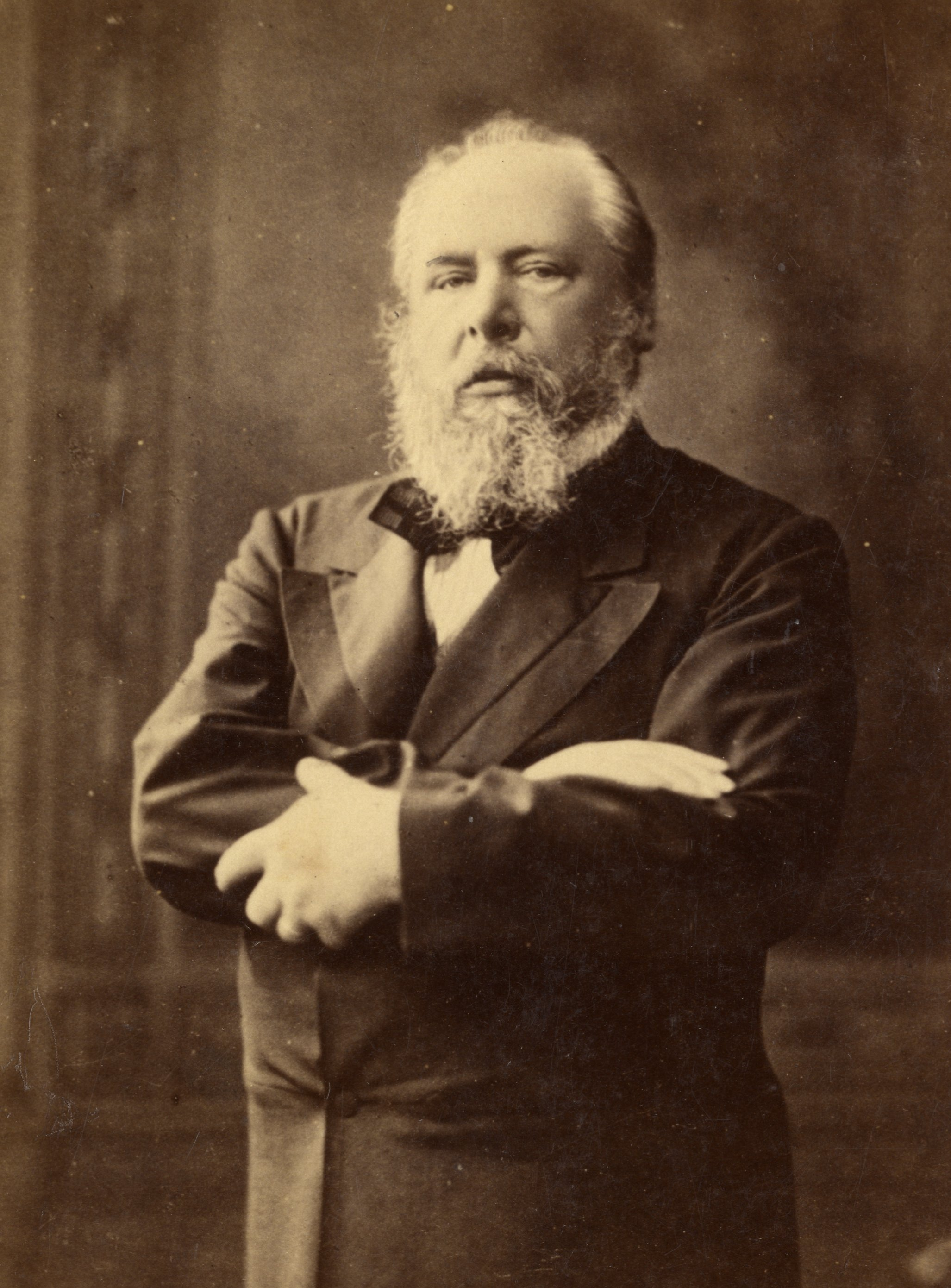
- Formal portrait, c. 1887

King of the Netherlands Grand Duke of Luxembourg
- Reign: 17 March 1849 – 23 November 1890
- Inauguration: 12 May 1849
- Predecessor: William II
- Successor: Netherlands: Wilhelmina; Luxembourg: Adolphe

Duke of Limburg
- Reign: 17 March 1849 – 23 August 1866
- Predecessor: William II
- Born: 19 February 1817; Palace of the Nation, Brussels, United Kingdom of the Netherlands
- Died: 23 November 1890 (aged 73); Het Loo Palace, Apeldoorn, Netherlands
- Burial: 4 December 1890; Nieuwe Kerk, Delft, Netherlands
- Spouse: Sophie of Württemberg (m. 1839; died 1877) Emma of Waldeck and Pyrmont (m. 1879)
- Issue: William, Prince of Orange; Prince Maurice; Alexander, Prince of Orange; Wilhelmina, Queen of the Netherlands
Names
- Dutch: Willem Alexander Paul Frederik Lodewijk; French: Guillaume Alexander Paul Frédéric Louis
- House: Orange-Nassau
- Father: William II of the Netherlands
- Mother: Anna Pavlovna of Russia
- Religion: Dutch Reformed Church

William III (Dutch: Willem III, French: Guillaume III; 19 February 1817 – 23 November 1890) was King of the Netherlands and Grand Duke of Luxembourg from 1849 until his death in 1890, and was also the Duke of Limburg from 1849 until the abolition of the duchy in 1866. Having reigned for 41 years, he is the second-longest reigning Dutch monarch, only surpassed by his daughter, Wilhelmina.

William was the son of King William II and Anna Pavlovna of Russia. On the abdication of his paternal grandfather William I in 1840, he became the Prince of Orange. On the death of his father in 1849, he succeeded as king of the Netherlands.

William married his cousin Sophie of Württemberg in 1839 and they had three sons, William, Maurice, and Alexander, all of whom predeceased him. After Sophie's death in 1877, he married Emma of Waldeck and Pyrmont in 1879 and they had one daughter, Wilhelmina, who succeeded William to the Dutch throne. He was the last male Dutch monarch until the accession of his great-great-grandson Willem-Alexander in 2013, over 112 years after his death. Meanwhile, being the last agnatic dynastic descendant of Otto I, Count of Nassau, the throne of the Grand Duchy of Luxembourg passed to his patrilineal seventeenth cousin once removed (and matrilineal third cousin), Adolphe. As of 2026, he is the last Dutch monarch to die whilst on the throne; all of his successors have abdicated in favor of their children.

== Early life ==
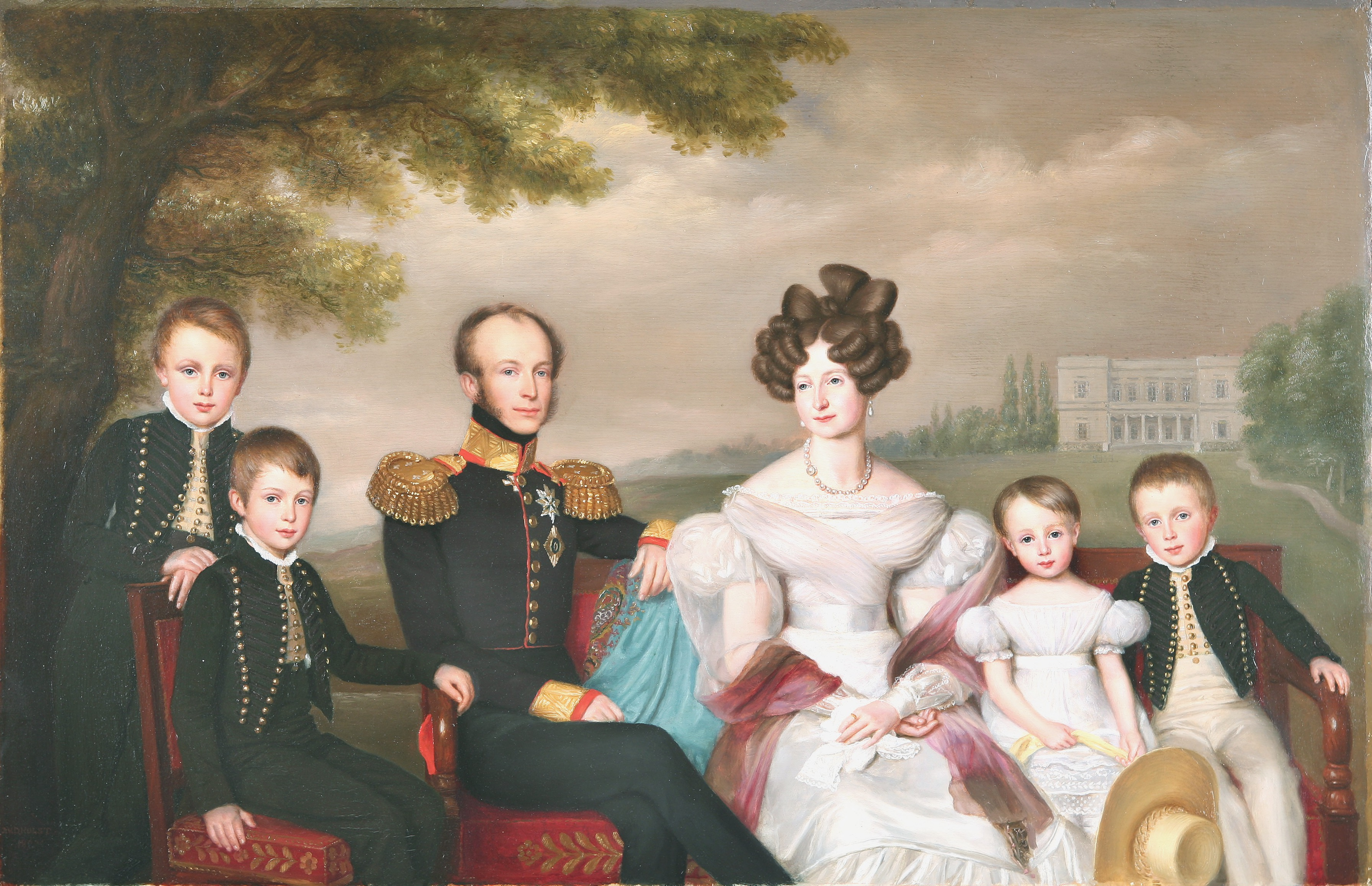
King William II and his family (1832) by Jan Baptist van der Hulst with William III on the far left

William was born on 19 February 1817 in the Palace of the Nation in Brussels, which was one of the capitals of the United Kingdom of the Netherlands. He was the eldest son of the future king William II of the Netherlands and Anna Pavlovna of Russia. He had three brothers, one of whom died in infancy, and one sister. William was particularly close to his brother Alexander, who was only 18 months his junior and for the most part was raised alongside him. As adults the two princes shared a passion for outdoor pursuits like shooting, riding and falconry as well as horse racing. Both were active members of the Royal Loo Hawking Club, which drew a large crowd of hunting enthusiasts to Het Loo Palace during the 1840s and early 1850s. William and Alexander also shared a deep frustration at not being given any meaningful tasks in the military. Alexander, who had a lively, amiable, tactful personality, got on well with his hot headed, capricious brother. His death at age 29 was a great loss to William, who counted him a true friend. He never became close to his youngest brother Henry, who was painfully shy, easily embarrassed and anxious to avoid incurring William's wrath.

William and his brothers were raised by military men (their governors were distinguished officers decorated with the Military Order of William) and expected to join the military. In 1827, at the age of ten, William was made an honorary colonel in the Royal Netherlands Army by his grandfather. In the 1830s, he served as lieutenant in the Grenadiers Regiment and studied at Leiden University for a while, though without attempting to attain any degree. In 1834, during a visit to his maternal uncle Tsar Nicholas I, he was made honorary commander of the Grenadiers Regiment of Kiev nr. 5 in the Imperial Russian Army.

He married his first cousin, Sophie, daughter of King William I of Württemberg and Grand Duchess Catherine Pavlovna of Russia, in Stuttgart on 18 June 1839. This marriage was unhappy and was characterized by struggles about their children. Sophie was a liberal intellectual, hating everything leaning toward dictatorship, such as the army. William was simpler, more conservative, and loved the military. He prohibited intellectual exercise at home, for which action Queen Victoria of the United Kingdom, who corresponded with Princess Sophie, called him an uneducated farmer. His extramarital enthusiasms, however, led The New York Times to call him "the greatest debauchee of the age". Another cause of marital tension (and later political tension) was his capriciousness; he could rage against someone one day, and be extremely polite the next. The situation was made worse by Sophie, who made no secret of the fact she had never wanted to marry William in the first place and considered herself intellectually superior to him. She could be very dramatic, often complaining about her suffering and her wish to die and expressing negative opinions about pretty much everyone who crossed her path in The Netherlands, especially her inlaws.

William struggled with his position as heir to the throne. Upon his father's investiture as king in 1840 he was made Inspector-General of Infantry and promoted to Lieutenant-General. The position was purely honorary and William relinquished it only 5 years later. His father gave him no role in politics and did little to prepare him for his future role.

William loathed the 1848 constitutional changes initiated by his father (William II) and Johan Rudolf Thorbecke. His father saw them as key to the monarchy's survival in changing times. Sophie, who was a liberal, also shared this view. William himself saw them as useless limitations of royal power, and would have preferred to govern as an enlightened despot in the mold of his grandfather, William I.

He considered relinquishing his right to the throne to his older son. His mother convinced him to cancel this action. The Dutch constitution provided no way to relinquish one's claim to the throne.

On 17 March 1849, his father died and William succeeded to the throne of the Netherlands. He was at that moment a guest of the Duchess of Cleveland in Raby Castle. Representatives of the Dutch government traveled to London to meet their new king. William was reluctant to return, but he was convinced to do so. Upon arrival the new queen welcomed her spouse with the question "did you accept?". The new king nodded, but he remained uncertain about the matter for some time.

== Reign ==
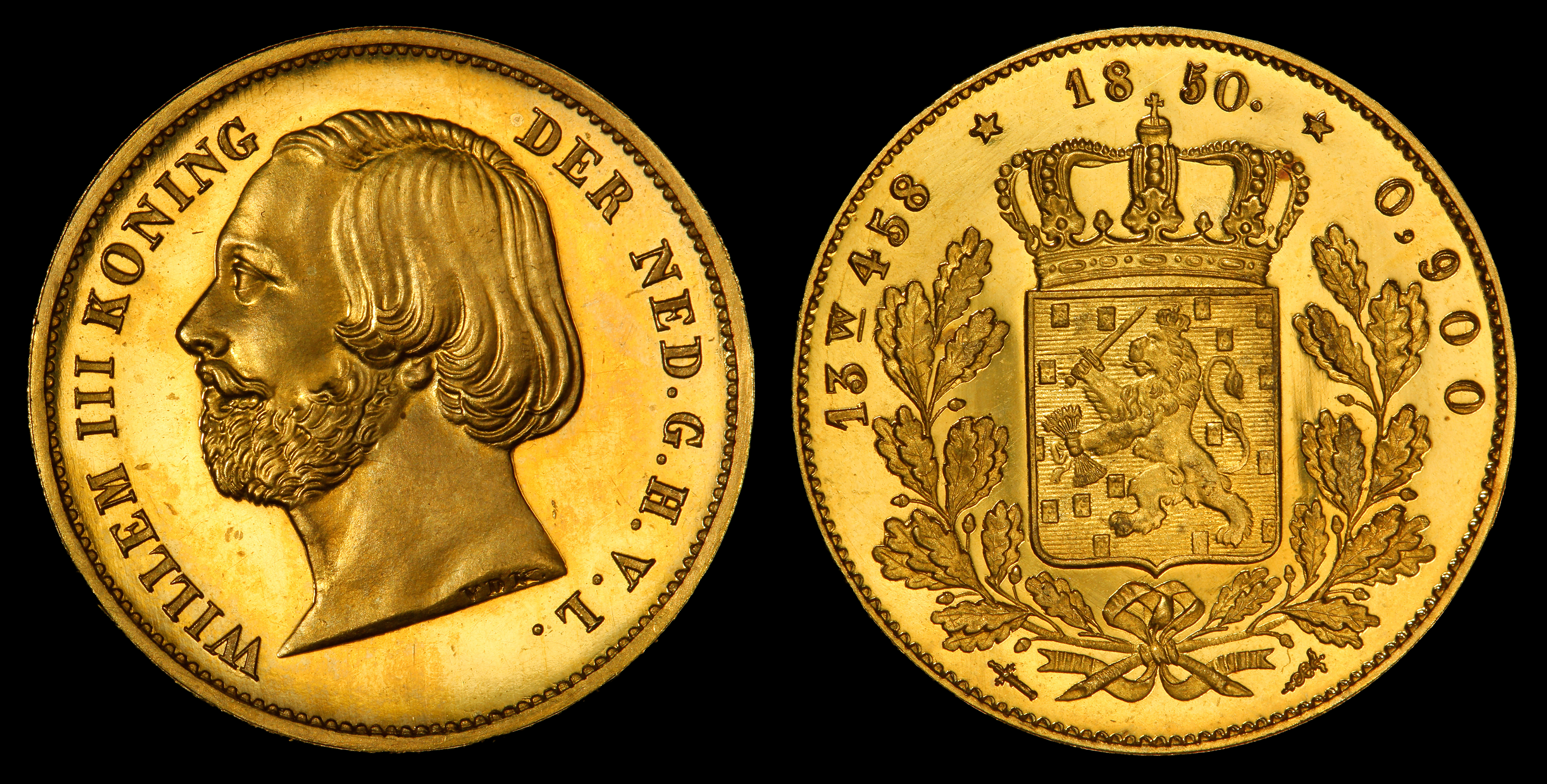
William III depicted on a 20 gulden proof gold coin (1850)

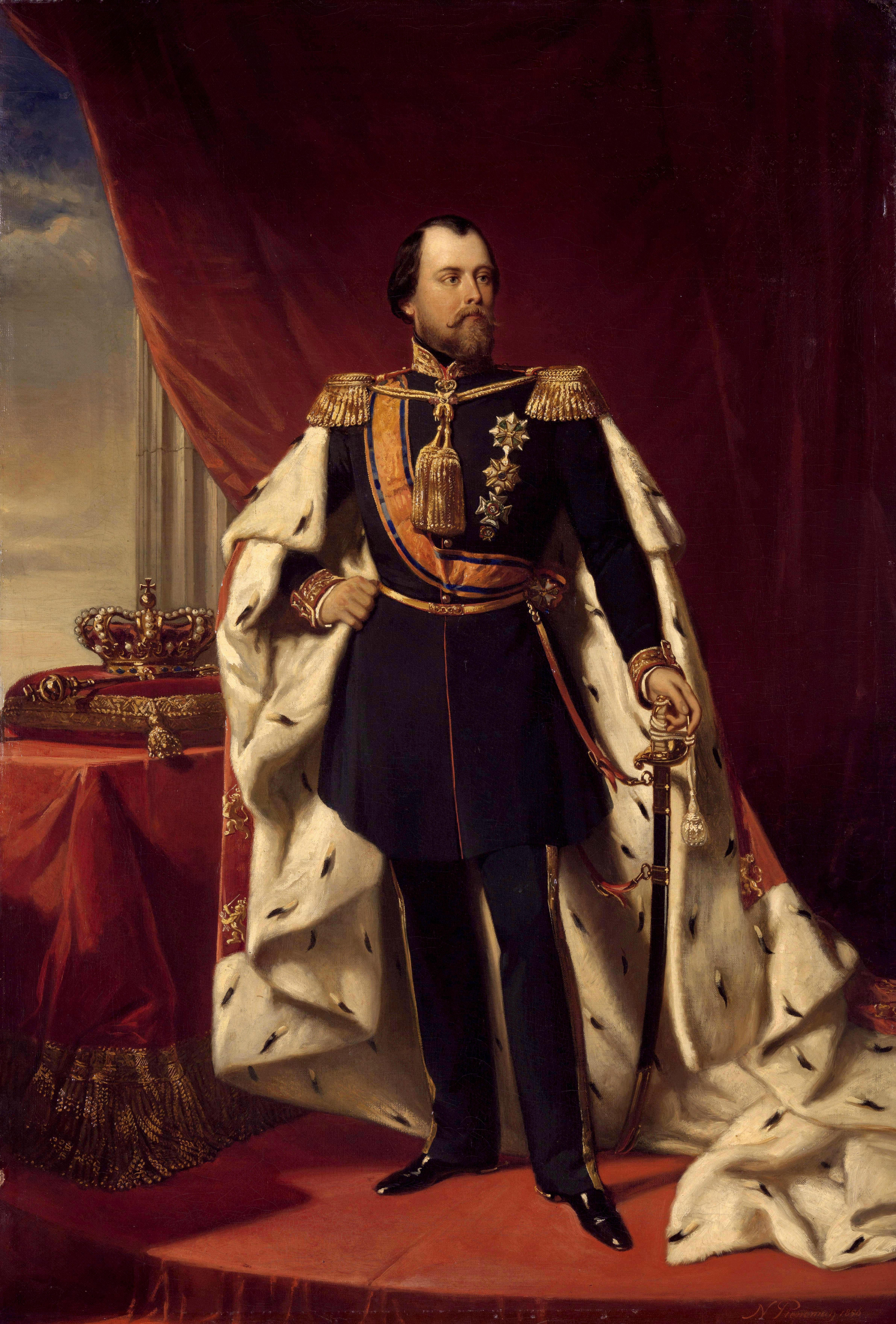
Portrait by Nicolaas Pieneman, 1856

William repeatedly contemplated abdicating as soon as his eldest son William, Prince of Orange, turned eighteen. This occurred in 1858, but as William was uncomfortable making a decision he remained king. The new king's first act was the inauguration of the parliamentary cabinet of Thorbecke, the designer of the liberal 1848 constitution. Before 1848, the king had been a near-autocrat, but the 1848 document stripped the crown of most of its political powers while transferring most of the real power to the States-General (parliament).

When the Roman Catholic hierarchy of bishops was restored in 1853, he found growing conservative support and a reason to dismiss Thorbecke. In the first two decades of his reign, he dismissed several cabinets and disbanded parliament several times. He was able to install royal cabinets which ruled as long as there was support in the elected second chamber of parliament.

In what became known as the "Luxembourg Coup of 1856", William unilaterally instituted a new, reactionary constitution for Luxembourg, which he ruled personally, separate from the Dutch crown.

In 1867, France offered to buy Luxembourg, leading to the Luxembourg Crisis, which almost precipitated war between Prussia and France. However, the subsequent Second Treaty of London confirmed Luxembourg as a fully independent country.

During his reign, the king became more and more unpopular with his bourgeois-liberal subjects, his whims provoking their resistance and mockery, but remained quite popular with the common man.

The king was a man of immense stature and with a boisterous voice. He could be gentle and kind, then suddenly he could become intimidating and even violent. His ministers were afraid of him. Most people around him agreed that he was, to some degree, insane.

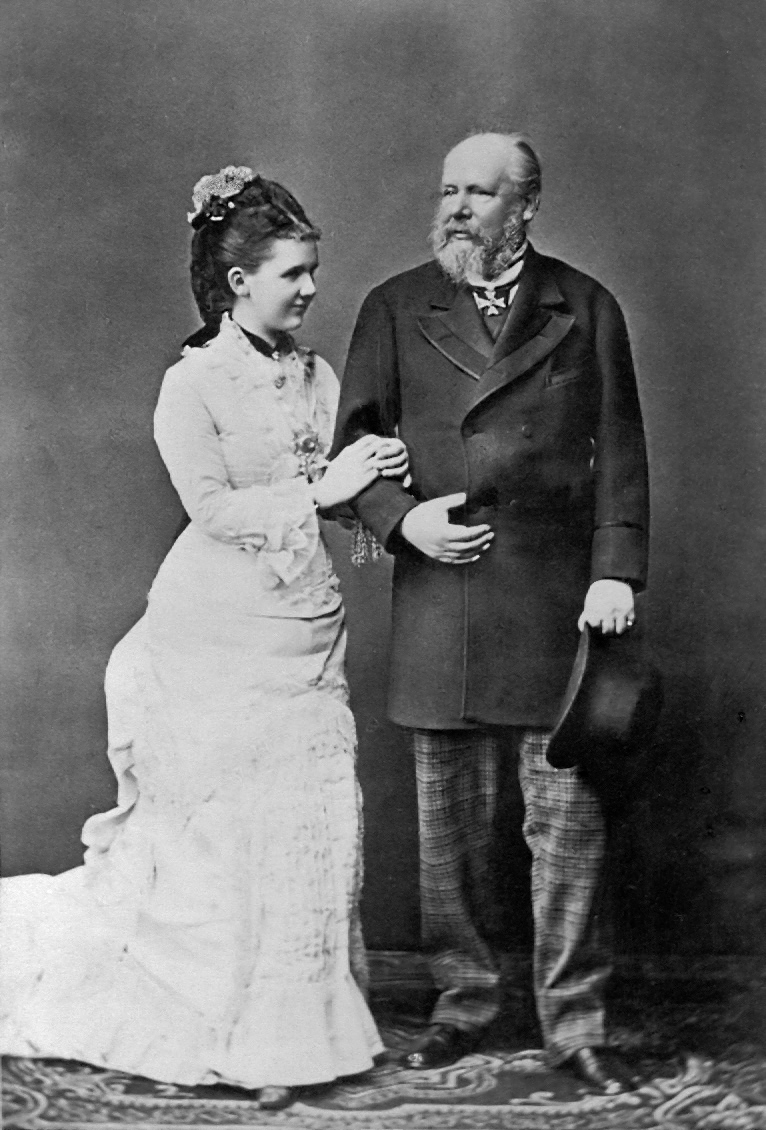
Queen Emma and King William III

The king could be erratic, he ordered the dismissal and even the arrest and execution of those that he found in lack of respect, including a Mayor of The Hague. Orders like these were disregarded. The king who thought of himself as a specialist on all matters military frequently tried to take command of manoeuvres, creating chaos wherever he went.

In 1877, Queen Sophie died and years of war in the palace came to an end. In the same year, King William announced his intention to marry Émilie Ambre, a French opera singer, whom he ennobled as countess d'Ambroise – without government consent. Under pressure from society and the government, he abandoned these marriage plans.

William remained eager to remarry. In 1878, he first proposed to his niece, Princess Elisabeth Sybille of Saxe-Weimar-Eisenach. He then considered marriage with Princess Pauline of Waldeck and Pyrmont, a small German principality, and Princess Thyra of Denmark, who had her own private scandalous history.

He finally decided to marry Pauline's younger sister Emma of Waldeck and Pyrmont. Some politicians were quite angry, as she was 41 years the king's junior. Emma showed herself, however, as a cordial woman. William asked permission from parliament, this was easily granted. The couple were quickly married in Bad Arolsen on 7 January 1879.

William III had to deal with low popularity in the last years of his reign. One cause for this was the satirical pamphlet From the life of King Gorilla, in which the many scandals of William III were mentioned.

In 1880, Wilhelmina was born. She became heir presumptive in 1884 after the death of the last remaining son from William's first marriage.

King William became seriously ill in 1887. He was suffering from a kidney ailment. However, in 1888, he personally presented a gold medal of honor to the lifeboat hero Dorus Rijkers, for saving the lives of 20 people.

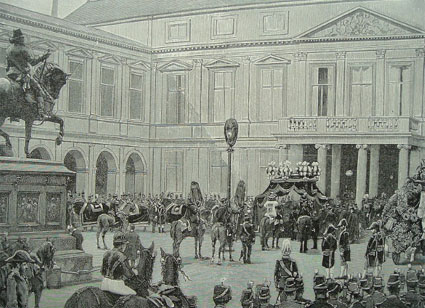
Funeral of William III in 1890

In 1889 and 1890, the ailing king became increasingly demented. The Council of State and then Queen Emma became regents. William III died at Het Loo Palace in 1890. Because Wilhelmina had not yet reached adulthood, Emma became regent for her daughter. She would remain regent until Wilhelmina's eighteenth birthday in 1898.

== Family and issue ==
Of William III's four legitimate children, three reached adulthood, two sons from his marriage to Queen Sophie and one daughter from his marriage to Queen Emma:

- Willem Nicolaas Alexander Frederik Karel Hendrik (1840–1879), heir apparent to the throne from 1849 to his death
- Willem Frederik Maurits Alexander Hendrik Karel (1843–1850)
- Willem Alexander Karel Hendrik Frederik (1851–1884), heir apparent to the throne from 1879 to his death
- Wilhelmina Helena Pauline Maria (1880–1962), Queen of the Netherlands from 1890 to 1948

Standing at 196 cm (6 ft 5 in) he was an exceptionally large and strong man. William III was known to be a philanderer and had several dozen illegitimate children from various mistresses.

== Honours and arms ==
Monogram of King William III

National orders and decorations

- Founder and Joint Grand Master of the Order of the Gold Lion of Nassau, 16 March 1858

Foreign orders and decorations

- Russian Empire: Knight of St. Andrew, 7 April 1817
- Kingdom of Prussia:
  - Knight of the Black Eagle, 29 December 1833; with Collar, 1878
  - Grand Commander's Cross of the Royal House Order of Hohenzollern, 24 August 1878
- Kingdom of Hanover:
  - Grand Cross of the Royal Guelphic Order, 1836
  - Knight of St. George, 1849
- Württemberg: Grand Cross of the Württemberg Crown, 1838
- Spain: Knight of the Golden Fleece, February 1842
- Saxe-Weimar-Eisenach: Grand Cross of the White Falcon, 17 April 1843
- Belgium: Grand Cordon of the Order of Leopold (civil), 15 April 1849
- Sweden-Norway:
  - Knight of the Seraphim, 23 May 1849
  - Grand Cross of St. Olav, 18 March 1851
- Denmark: Knight of the Elephant, 24 August 1849
- Austrian Empire: Grand Cross of the Royal Hungarian Order of St. Stephen, 1849
- Electorate of Hesse: Knight of the Golden Lion, 30 May 1858
- Grand Duchy of Hesse: Grand Cross of the Ludwig Order, 29 December 1858
- Nassau: Grand Cross of Adolphe of Nassau, with Swords, June 1858
- Baden:
  - Knight of the House Order of Fidelity, 1858
  - Grand Cross of the Zähringer Lion, 1858
- Kingdom of Bavaria: Knight of St. Hubert, 1861
- Kingdom of Saxony: Knight of the Rue Crown, 1862
- Mexican Empire: Grand Cross of the Mexican Eagle, with Collar, 1865
- Monaco: Grand Cross of St. Charles, 13 April 1875
- (Saxe-Coburg and Gotha) (Duchy of Saxe-Altenburg) (Saxe-Meiningen) Ernestine duchies: Grand Cross of the Saxe-Ernestine House Order, 1878
- Empire of Japan: Grand Cordon of the Order of the Chrysanthemum, 7 May 1880
- United Kingdom: Knight of the Garter, 24 April 1882
- Kingdom of Italy: Knight of the Annunciation, 2 January 1883
- Kingdom of Portugal: Grand Cross of the Tower and Sword

William III of the Netherlands House of Orange-Nassau Cadet branch of the House of Nassau Born: 19 February 1817 Died: 23 November 1890
Regnal titles
Preceded by William II	King of the Netherlands; 1849–1890	Succeeded by Wilhelmina
Preceded by William II	Grand Duke of Luxembourg; 1849–1890	Succeeded by Adolphe
Preceded by William II	Duke of Limburg; 1849–1866	Abolition Treaty of London (1867)
Dutch royalty
Preceded by William later became King William II	Prince of Orange; 1840–1849	Succeeded by William
