= William, Prince of Orange =

Dutch prince (1840–1879)

William
- Prince of Orange
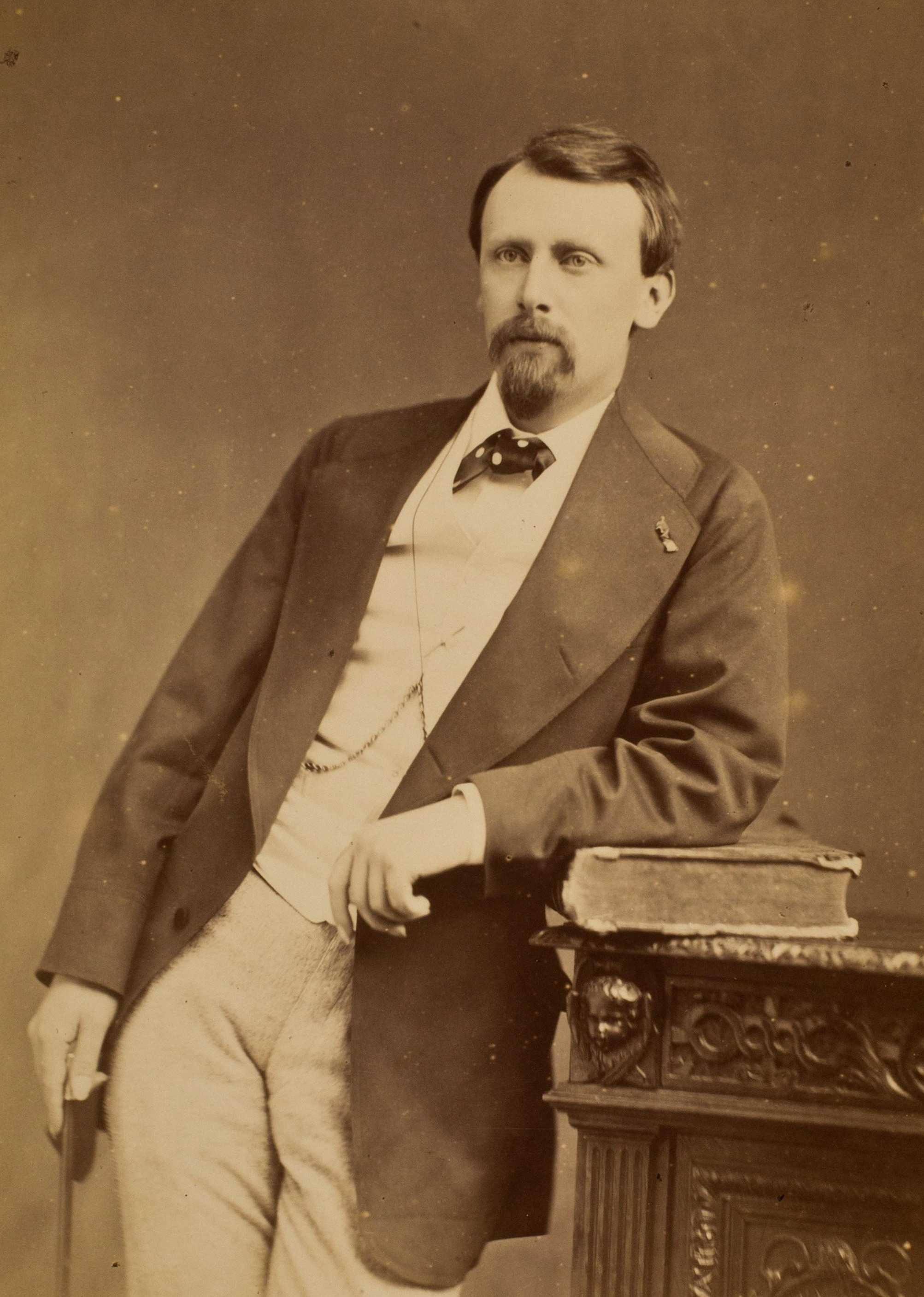
- William, circa 1870
- Born: 4 September 1840; Paleis aan het Plein, The Hague, Netherlands
- Died: 11 June 1879 (aged 38); Paris, France
- Burial: 26 June 1879; Nieuwe Kerk, Delft, Netherlands
Names
- Willem Nicolaas Alexander Frederik Karel Hendrik
- House: Orange-Nassau
- Father: William III of the Netherlands
- Mother: Sophie of Württemberg

William, Prince of Orange (Willem Nicolaas Alexander Frederik Karel Hendrik; 4 September 1840 – 11 June 1879), was heir apparent to the Dutch throne as the eldest son of King William III from 17 March 1849 until his death.

== Early life ==
Prince William was the eldest son of King William III of the Netherlands and his first wife, Princess Sophie of Württemberg. He was born in the afternoon of 4 September 1840 at the royal apartments of his parents in The Hague (Paleis aan het Plein). His nickname was Wiwill. At his birth, he held the third position in the line of succession to the Dutch throne behind his grandfather and father. He was also seventeenth in the line of succession to the British throne, his claim being through his mother Sophie's great-grandmother Princess Augusta of Great Britain.

On 7 October 1840, only a month after his birth, his great-grandfather, the reigning King William I of the Netherlands, abdicated the throne due to disappointment over the recent Treaty of London, which recognized the independence of Belgium (previously provinces of the United Kingdom of the Netherlands), and the intention of marrying a Roman Catholic and Belgian noblewoman, Henrietta d'Oultremont. In 1849, after the death of his grandfather King William II of the Netherlands, he became Prince of Orange as heir apparent. His Victorian upbringing turned out to be a disaster.

== Failed marriage attempts ==
After attempts to marry Prince William off to Princess Alice of the United Kingdom, the second daughter of Queen Victoria or Grand Duchess Maria Alexandrovna of Russia failed, the prince fell in love with the 19-year-old Countess Mathilde of Limburg-Stirum in 1873. The relationship between the prince and his parents became very problematic, as his parents (who rarely agreed on anything) refused William's wish to accept Mathilde as his bride in 1874. By the standards of the Dutch royal family, a marriage between a member of the royal family and a member of the nobility was considered unequal and therefore unacceptable. Also a rumour circulated that Mathilde was an illegitimate daughter of King William III and so William would potentially be marrying his own half-sister. The 33-year-old William wanted to marry, if necessary, without the consent of his parents (this would have cost him his position in the line of succession). However Mathilde was not yet twenty and permission was needed from her parents too. Since they denied permission, the prince's attempt to marry Mathilde failed. She finally married in 1881 Baron Reginald van Tuyll (1845–1903, who may have inspired the eponymous character in P. G. Wodehouse's book Indiscretions of Archie, 1921). She died on 14 May 1932, at age 77 at Popham, Hampshire, in England, nearby her daughter Julia Sheffield, Lady Sheffield.

== Death and aftermath ==
Heavily disillusioned with his situation in the Netherlands, Prince William then went into exile in Paris, where he threw himself into a life of sex, drinking and gambling. He shared this life with Henriette Hauser (also Hausser), his Parisian mistress, a "boulevard theatre" actress. The Duke de Gramont-Caderousse, a French fellow hedonist, gave him the nickname "Prince Lemon" [le prince Citron in French]; the nickname became popular among the regulars in the recently created boulevards and the Parisian newspapers when they reported about his debauched lifestyle. Prince William died at the age of 38 in his apartment in the Rue Auber, near the Paris Opera from a combination of typhus, liver complaints and total exhaustion. On 26 June 1879 his body was entombed in the royal crypt at the New Church of Delft. On his coffin there was a wreath from French Empress Eugénie de Montijo and one from the future King Edward VII, who had been his fellow debauchee.

After his death, his brother Alexander became heir-apparent and Prince of Orange. However he also died before their father, who was now without sons. The States-General adopted cognatic primogeniture in 1888.

His half-sister, the future queen Wilhelmina, was born a year after his death.

== Honours ==
- Belgium: Grand Cordon of the Order of Leopold (civil), 21 October 1861

== Footnotes ==
William, Prince of Orange House of Orange-Nassau Cadet branch of the House of Nassau Born: 4 September 1840 Died: 11 June 1879
Dutch royalty
Preceded by William later became King William III	Prince of Orange; 1849–1879	Succeeded by Alexander
