= Roode =

Roode means red in Dutch and may refer to

- Roode Els Berg Dam in South Africa
- De Roode Duivel, Dutch weekly magazine
- Bobby Roode (born 1977), Canadian wrestler
- Dewald Roode (1940–2009), South African academic
