= Republicanism in the Netherlands =

Movement to abolish the country's monarchy

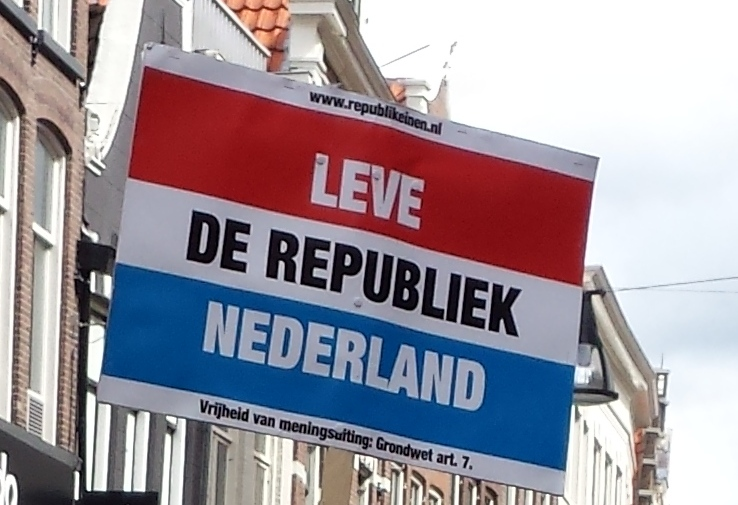
NRG protest sign on King's Day 2016 in Zwolle: "Long live the Republic of the Netherlands"

Republicanism in the Netherlands is a movement that strives to abolish the Dutch monarchy and replace it with a republic. Currently, the Netherlands is a constitutional monarchy with the King as the head of state and the Prime Minister as the head of government.

The popularity of the organised republican movement that seeks to abolish the monarchy in its entirety has been suggested to be a minority among the people of the Netherlands, according to opinion polls (according to one 2023 poll, 37%).

== Terminology ==
In discussions on forms of government, it is common to refer to certain 'models', based on how other countries are constituted:

- Spanish model: a constitutional monarchy in which the monarch at least nominally has limited political power.
- Swedish model: a constitutional monarchy in which the monarch has an entirely ceremonial role in law as well as in fact.
- German model: a parliamentary republic in which Parliament elects the President who serves as head of state and who has little to no power.
- American model: a presidential republic in which the President is elected by the people and serves as head of state and head of government.
- French model: a semi-presidential republic in which the President is directly elected by the population and shares power with a Prime Minister.

== Historical development ==
=== 1581–1795: Dutch Republic ===
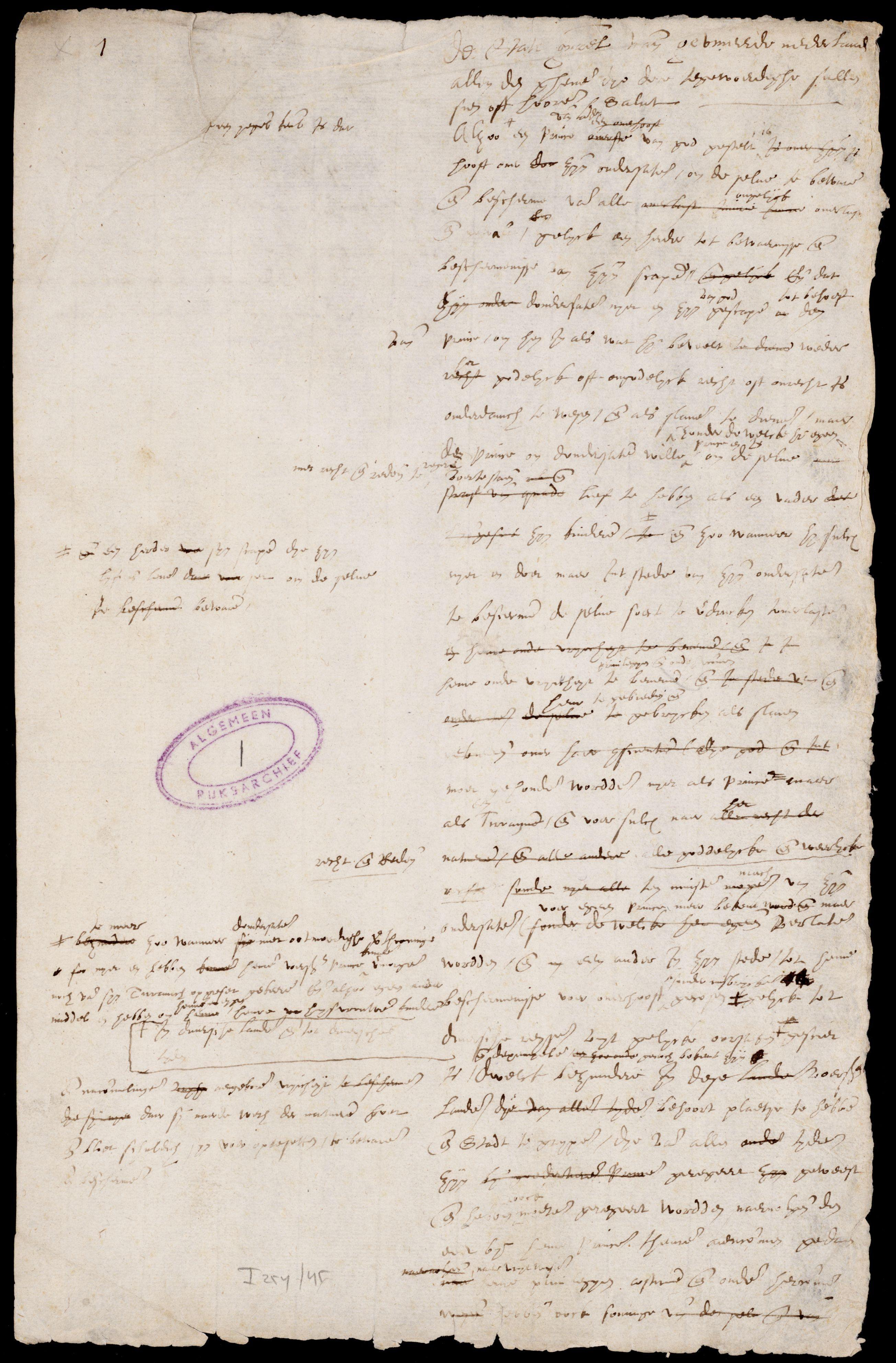
First page of the Act of Abjuration, the Dutch declaration of independence from the Spanish monarchy. It would eventually lead to the foundation of the Dutch Republic in 1588.

==== Establishment of the Republic ====
The Netherlands emerged as a state during the Eighty Years' War (1568–1648), when the vast majority of deputies of the States General of the Netherlands concluded the Union of Utrecht in 1579, and declared their independence from Philip II's Spanish Empire with the Act of Abjuration in 1581. After futile attempts to find a suitable alternative hereditary head of state – duke Francis of Anjou (1580–1583), William the Silent (1583–1584), (Note: In early 1583, in connection with the French Fury, the States of Holland and West Friesland deposed Francis of Anjou as their count, citing incompetence. On 26 March 1583, the States of Holland wrote down in a charter, sealed by all 25 ridderschappen, noblemen and cities of Holland, that they recognised William "the Silent" of Orange as the new count of Holland, although with certain constraints on his authority. William tentatively agreed, while negotiations on the exact terms continued for months, and preparations were made for his planned inauguration on 12 July 1584. However, William was assassinated on 10 July 1584, two days before the ceremony was set to take place.) and earl Robert of Leicester (1585–1588) – the States of Holland and West Friesland resolved to proclaim their sovereignty in mid-1587. After a fallout with Leicester, who resigned in early April 1588, the States General issued the instruction of 12 April 1588, formally establishing the Dutch Republic. However, the war initially had neither the achievement of political independence nor the establishment of a republic as its ultimate goal, nor were the Southern Netherlands excluded from it on purpose. Rather, the inability of the Habsburg regime to adequately address religious, social and political unrest (that was originally most pressing in Flanders and Brabant), led to an irreconcilable situation. An independent Calvinist-dominated republic in the Northern Netherlands, opposed to the continuously Spanish Catholic-dominated royalist Southern Netherlands, was the unintended, improvised result. As the war progressed however, the House of Orange-Nassau played an increasingly important role, finally accumulating all stadtholderates and military leadership positions within the Dutch Republic by 1590. Struggles between the House of Orange, which gradually built up a dynasty with monarchical aspirations, and the Dutch States Party, a loose coalition of factions that favoured a republican, in most cases more or less oligarchical form of government, continued throughout the 17th and 18th centuries.

==== Loevesteiners and Enlightenment ====
In 1610, lawyer Hugo Grotius (1583–1645) wrote On the Antiquity of the Batavian Republic, which attempted to show the States of Holland had always been sovereign (even since the Batavians), and could appoint or depose a prince whenever they so desired. The work's main purpose was to justify the Revolt against the Spanish Empire, and the independent existence of the emergent Dutch Republic.

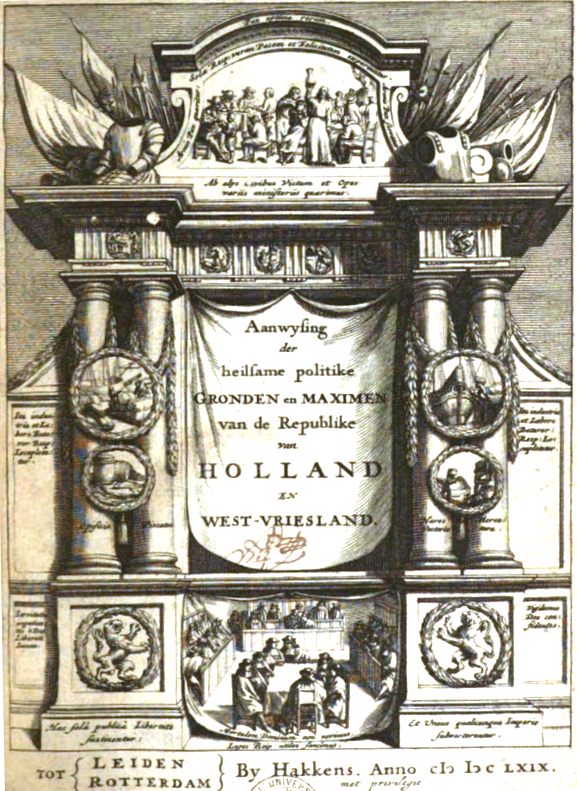
Pieter de la Court's Aanwysing (1669), a fierce republican plea

Modern historians agree that ever since the stadtholderate of Frederick Henry, Prince of Orange (1625–1647), the Princes of Orange had sought to turn the Dutch Republic into a monarchy under their rule. The 1650 imprisonment of several pro-States regenten and a failed coup d'état by Frederick Henry's son and successor, stadtholder William II, Prince of Orange, led to the rise of the Loevestein faction under leadership of Johan de Witt, which sought to establish a republic without Orange. Indeed, after William II's failed power grab and unexpected death, the provinces of Holland, Zeeland, Utrecht, Guelders and Overijssel decided not to appoint a new stadtholder at all, beginning the First Stadtholderless Period (1650–1672/5) in five of the seven United Provinces. Moreover, after the Dutch Republic was defeated by the Commonwealth of England in the First Anglo-Dutch War (1652–1654), the States of Holland led by Johan de Witt were forced to sign the Act of Seclusion, meaning William's son William III of Orange was excluded from holding the office of stadtholder of Holland. The legitimacy of necessity of the strange office of stadtholder was increasingly questioned and undermined, especially when it seemed evident that the House of Orange sought to make the office hereditary and had shown the willingness to use military violence in order to increase the stadtholderate's power.

The best known and most outspoken author representing the Loevesteiners was Pieter de la Court (1618–1685), who rejected monarchism in favour of a republican government in several of his writings. In the preface to the Interest of Holland (1662) he wrote: "No greater evil could befall the residents of Holland, than to be ruled by a Monarch, Lord or Chief: and (...) on the contrary, the Lord God cannot bestow a greater blessing upon a country, built on such foundations, than by constituting a free Republican or State-wise Government." In Aanwysing der heilsame politike Gronden en Maximen van de Republike van Holland en West-Vriesland (1669), he attacked the monarchy even more viciously.
Philosopher Baruch Spinoza (1632–1677), who regularly cited De la Court's works, described in his unfinished Tractatus Politicus (1677) how the ideal state, a democratic republic, should function. According to Spinoza, kings have a natural tendency to pursue their own personal interests, and entrust large portions of power to confidants (who lack any official mandate, but often de facto run the country if the king is a weakling). These confidants are often noblemen, making it an aristocracy instead of a monarchy in practice. The best monarchy is a quasi-monarchy, a crowned republic in which princes have as little power as possible. Spinoza proposes a council of state, elected by citizens, to take the most important decisions, and replace the murderous and pillaging royal mercenary armies by an unpaid draft army of citizens that defends its own country for self-preservation. If this council of state is large and representative enough, there will never be a majority in favour of war, because of all the suffering, destruction and high taxes it will cause.
Pastor and philosopher Frederik van Leenhof (1647–1715), who secretly admired the ideas of the very controversial Spinoza, held a thinly veiled plea for a kind of meritocratic republic in De Prediker van den wijzen en magtigen Konink Salomon (1700), whilst rejecting monarchy ("without doubt the most imperfect [rule]") and aristocracy. Hereditary succession is worthless; only reason provides legitimacy, and true sovereignty is the common good of the community. Royal standing armies of mercenaries are to be abolished, lest they be used to oppress the king's subjects; instead, the state should train its citizens and form a militia to be able to defend the common good.

==== Patriots ====
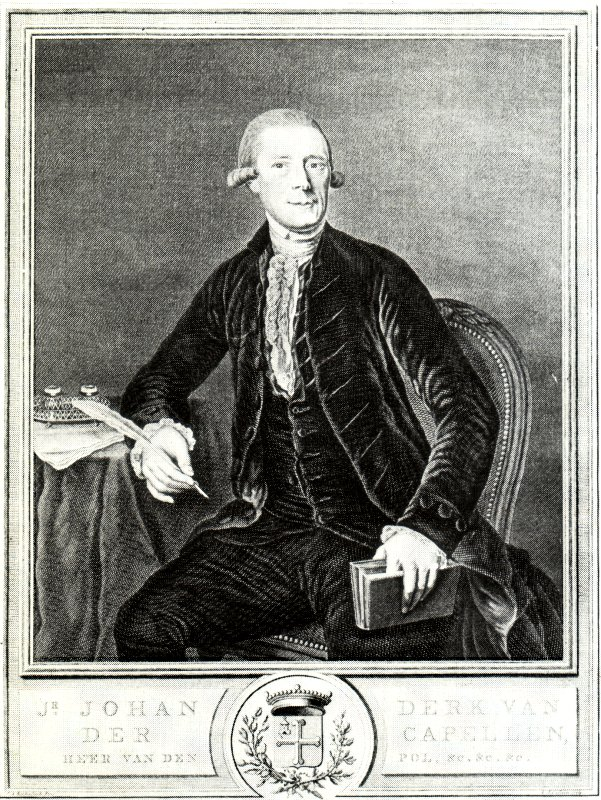
Patriot leader Van der Capellen, famous for his 1781 democratic republican pamphlet

From the 1770s onwards, the Patriots emerged as a third faction besides the Orangists and Loevesteiners. The Patriots were themselves divided: the aristocratic oudpatriotten or "Old Patriots" (the Loevesteiners' successors) either sought to enter the existing power factions, or to reduce or eliminate Orange's power, but had no desire for democratisation that could threaten their own privileges. The democratic Patriots wanted to found a democratic republic, sought complete equality and the eventual abolishment of the aristocracy as well. As the latter group grew in size and radicalised, this led some Old Patriots to reverse their allegiance back to Orange.

Discontented with the hereditary system of allocating posts, the decline of the Dutch East India Company's Asian trade, unemployment in the textile industry and the desire of democratisation, the middle and upper classes looked towards the American Revolution and its Declaration of Independence and the Dutch Act of Abjuration and began to reclaim their rights (first written down in the 1579 Union of Utrecht). The lower classes largely remained supportive of the existing Orange stadtholderian regime, which supported the British Empire against the American rebels. 1780 is generally regarded as the outbreak of the major conflict between Patriots and Orangists, when their opposing policies on the American War of Independence stirred up domestic conflict. When the Republic threatened to join the First League of Armed Neutrality to defend its right to trade with the American colonies in revolt, Britain declared war: the Fourth Anglo-Dutch War (1780–1784). The Patriots seized the occasion to try to rid themselves from Orange altogether, and allied themselves with the American republican revolutionaries. This was most clearly expressed in the 1781 pamphlet Aan het Volk van Nederland ("To the People of the Netherlands"), anonymously distributed by Joan van der Capellen tot den Pol. Partly thanks to his influence in the States General, the Netherlands became the second country to officially recognise the young American Republic in 1782. Between 1782 and 1787, democratic Patriotism managed to establish itself in parts of the Republic. From 1783 onwards, the Patriots formed militia or paramilitary groups called exercitiegenootschappen or vrijcorpsen. They tried to persuade the prince and city governments to allow non-Calvinists into the vroedschap. In 1784, they held their first national meeting. The total number of Patriot volunteer militiamen is estimated to have been around 28,000.

The provinces of Holland and Utrecht became strongholds of democratic Patriots in 1785, and William V fled from The Hague to Nijmegen that year. In 1787, he was finally able to restore his power with the Prussian invasion of Holland. Many Patriots fled the country to Northern France. French revolutionaries supported by the Batavian Legion (consisting of fled Patriots) conquered the Dutch Republic in 1795, founding the vassal Batavian Republic.

=== 1795–1806: Batavian Republic ===
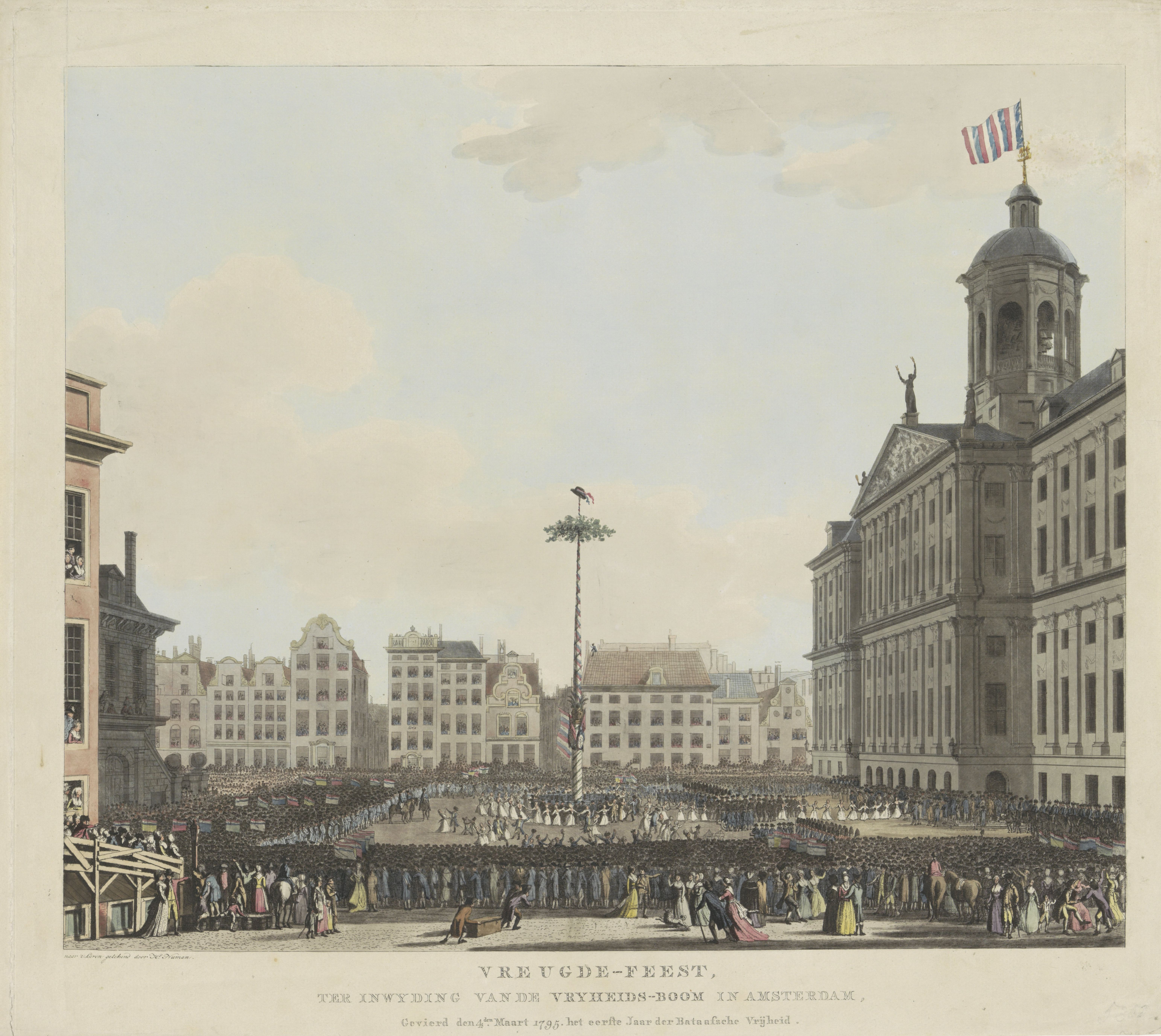
The Liberty Tree on Dam Square, symbolising the Batavian Republic

The last stadtholder, William V, fled with his son William Frederick to England on 18 January 1795, where they were granted a subsidy to compensate for the loss of all their possessions in the Netherlands, confiscated by the Batavian government. After losing hope of restoring the Orange dynasty following the disastrous Anglo-Russian invasion of Holland, William Frederick commenced negotiations with First Consul Napoleon of the French Republic. His attempts to be appointed President of the Batavian Republic while forsaking his hereditary succession were unsuccessful, as were his enormous demands of 117 million guilders in compensation for the lost domains and alleged debt he demanded from the Batavian Republic. In December 1801, William V issued the Oranienstein Letters, in which he formally recognised the Batavian Republic, as Napoleon demanded as precondition for any compensation. He would later refuse Napoleon's offer of Fulda and Corvey, which arguably demonstrated his selflessness. Unlike his father, however, and despite his father's protestations, William Frederick continued pursuing more financial and territorial compensation, and eventually settled for the Principality of Nassau-Orange-Fulda and a 5 million guilder indemnity by the Batavian Republic in 1802, whilst renouncing all his claims to the Netherlands. According to republicans, this demonstrated his personal greed and lack of any real devotion to the Dutch people. Moreover, when Napoleon discovered that his vassal William Frederick was secretly plotting with Prussia and refused to join the Confederation of the Rhine in 1806, he took Fulda from him again, after which William Frederick went into Prussian and later Austrian military service instead.

=== 1806–1830: Early monarchies ===
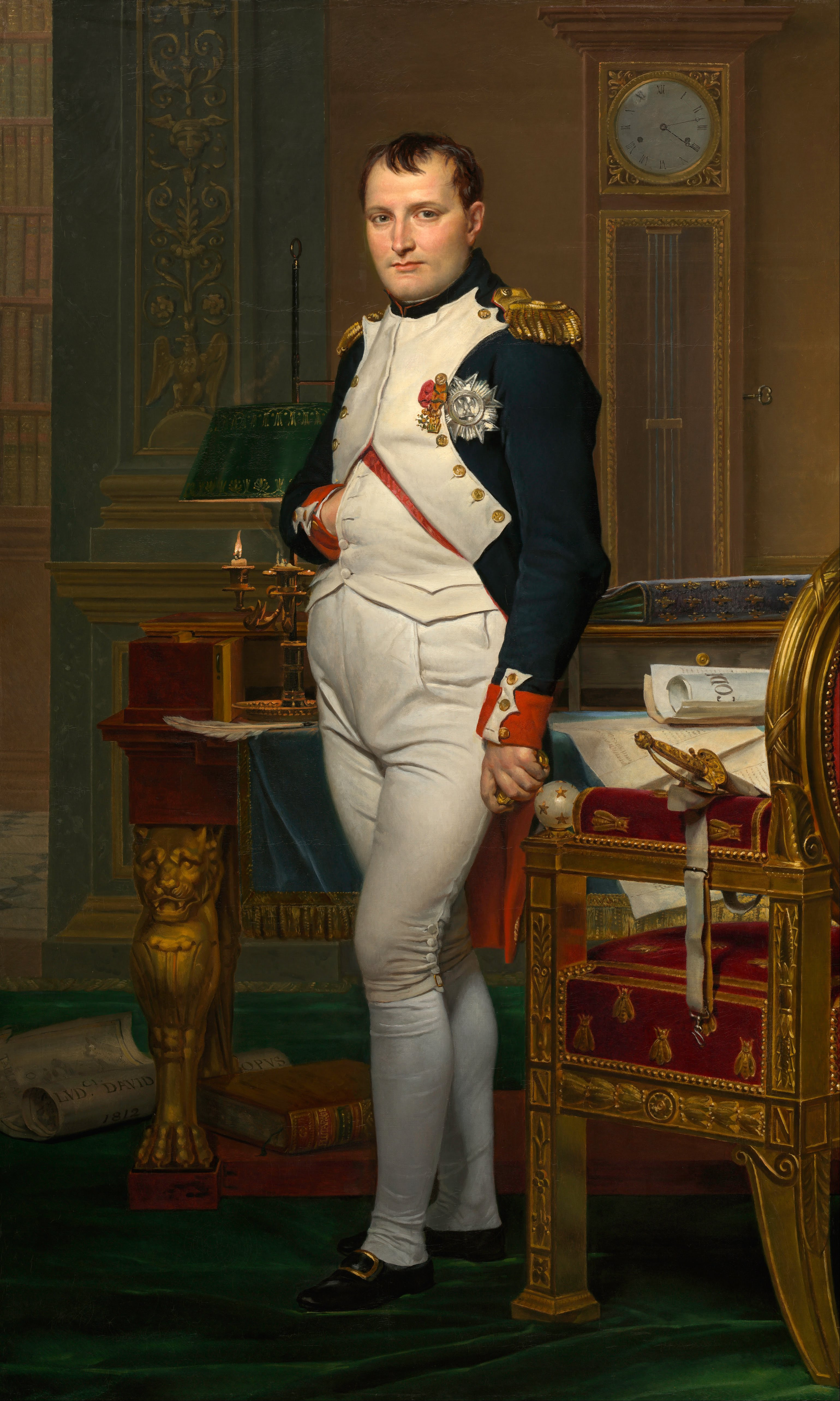
Napoleon

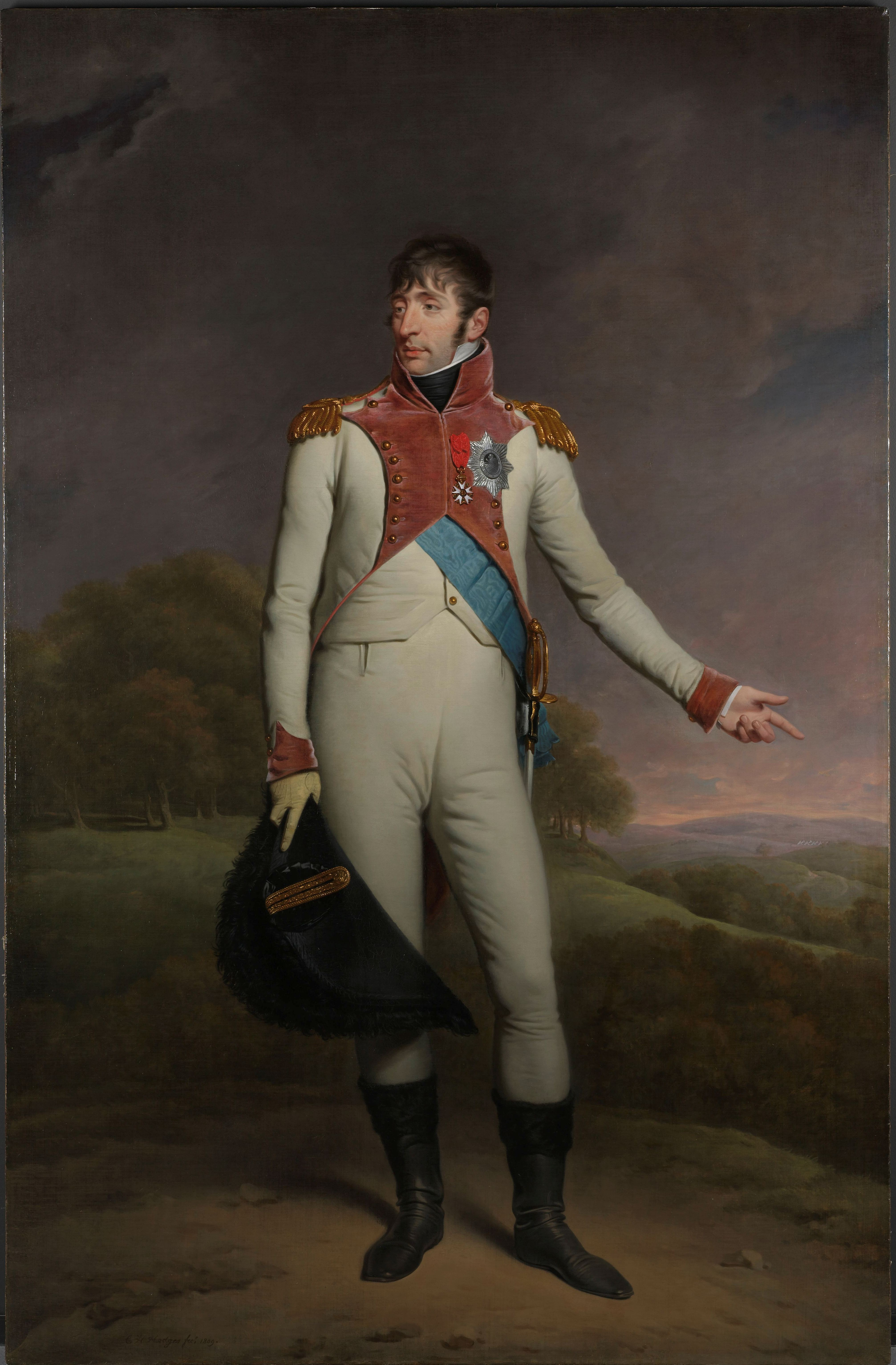
Louis Bonaparte

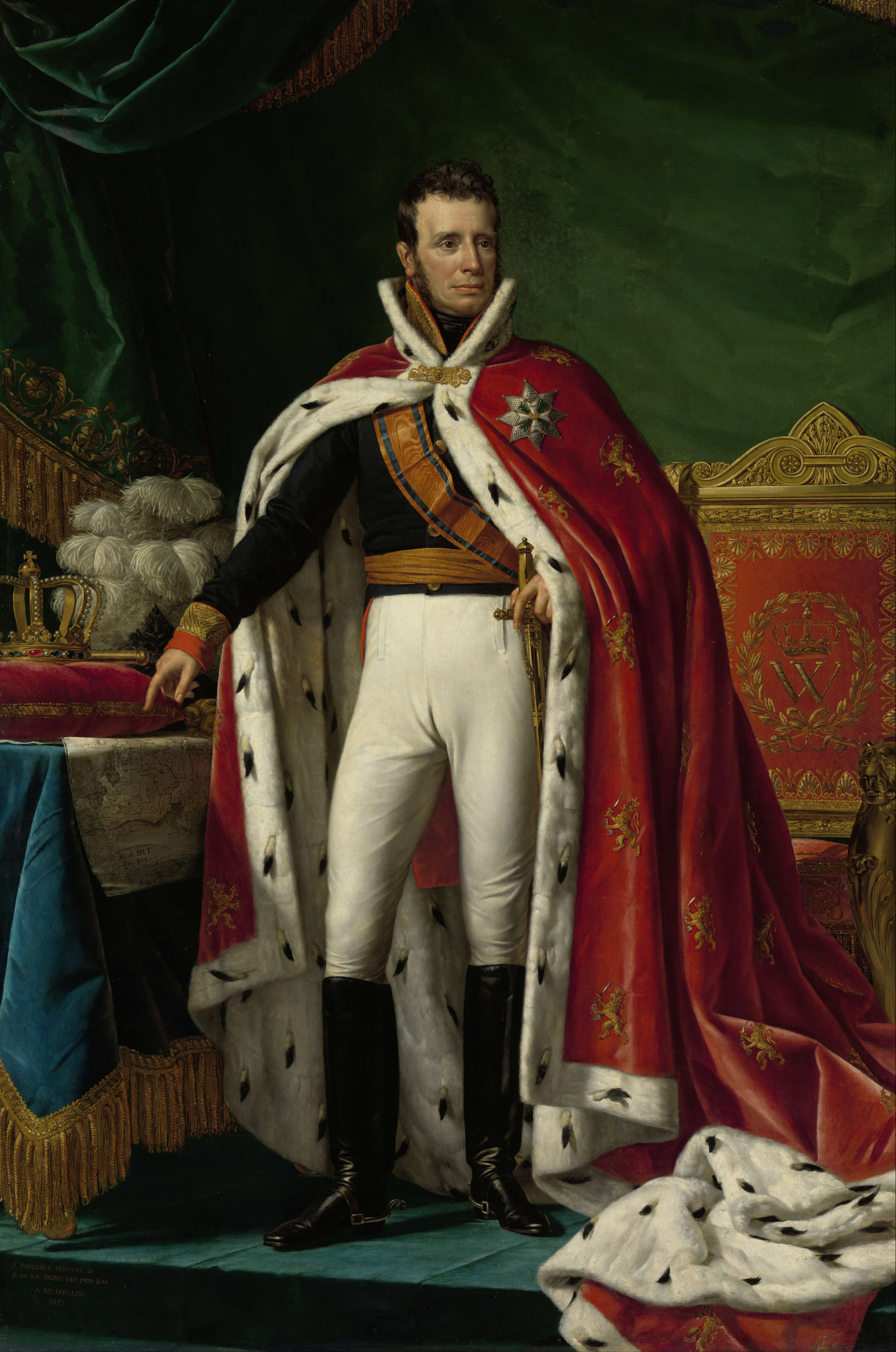
William I

The Netherlands became a constitutional monarchy in 1806, after French Emperor Napoleon appointed his younger brother Louis Bonaparte as vassal king over the Kingdom of Holland which replaced the Batavian Commonwealth. After a brief annexation by France, in which Napoleon ruled directly over the Netherlands (1810–1813), William Frederick of Orange returned to restore his dynasty following Napoleon's defeat at the Battle of Leipzig. The anti-French reactionary and Orangist ambiance amongst the Dutch populace, and the military forces of the conservative Sixth Coalition that occupied the Low Countries, allowed him first to establish the Sovereign Principality of the United Netherlands (1813–1815), a constitutional monarchy. During the Congress of Vienna, in which the European courts designed the Restoration, William lobbied successfully to unite the territories of the former Dutch Republic and Austrian Netherlands under his rule (confirmed by the Eight Articles of London). Next, he seized the opportunity of Napoleon's return to assume the title of King William I of the United Kingdom of the Netherlands on 16 March 1815 (confirmed by the Final Act of the Congress of Vienna on 9 June). His authority as an enlightened despot stretched much further now than it had even been under his stadtholder ancestors during the Dutch Republic. After the Belgian Revolution in 1830, the power of the Orange-Nassau family was again restricted to the Northern Netherlands, and the House of Representatives gradually gained influence through a series of constitutional reforms.

=== 1830–1848: Democratisation ===
==== William I's abdication ====
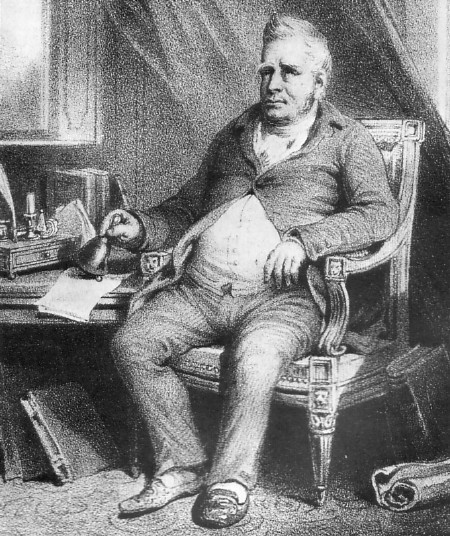
In 1840, William I stated, "I was born as a republican".

At first, William I refused to recognise Belgium's independence, and moreover he thought that if the Netherlands, then a powerful continental empire on paper, were again reduced to the old Dutch Republic's boundaries, there would be no point to a monarchy. His popularity suffered more and more because of his rejection to acknowledge Belgium, whilst maintaining an extremely expensive army that he intended to retake the South with. Opposition within the States-General became increasingly hostile until he finally agreed to sign the Treaty of London (1839). This necessitated a constitutional reform, during which the parliamentary opposition succeeded in introducing the principle of ministerial responsibility. King William vehemently detested this reform, so strongly that he was unwilling to continue his rule, and it was one of the reasons for his abdication on 7 October 1840. Another was that he threatened to lose what popularity he had left by his marriage with the half-Catholic Belgian courtesan Henrietta d'Oultremont, that many regarded as treason. Acknowledging his failed reign in 1840, he commented "Ne veut-on plus de moi? On n'a qu'à le dire; je n'ai pas besoin d'eux." ("Don't people want me anymore? They only have to say so; I don't need them.") and that "je suis né republicain" ("I was born as a republican").

==== Eillert Meeter ====
In May 1840, journalist, publisher and republican revolutionary Eillert Meeter and 25 comrades were arrested in Groningen after removing a painting of William I from a pub and toasting on the republic. They were suspected of conspiracy against the monarchy, but released three months later because the allegations could not be proven. Nevertheless, the public prosecutor tried to convict Meeter to four years imprisonment for his anti-authoritarian writings in his magazine De Tolk der Vrijheid ("The Spokesman of Freedom"); he fled to Belgium in February 1841, and eventually to Paris. From there, he requested and was granted amnesty by King William II, and moved to Amsterdam. As an investigative journalist, he gathered all kinds of scandalous stories of William II's personal life, including his attempts to become king of France or Belgium, a conspiracy against his own father when he wanted to remarry, and finally the king's secret homosexuality (considered perverse at the time). From 1840 to 1848, King William II frequently paid Meeter well to keep him silent. In 1857, Meeter published his memoires including his findings on royal affairs in English in London, Holland, Its Institutions, Its Press, Kings and Prisons, and although he had been accused of being a liar ever since, documents from the Royal House Archive in 2004 revealed he had written the truth.

==== 1848 Constitutional Reform ====
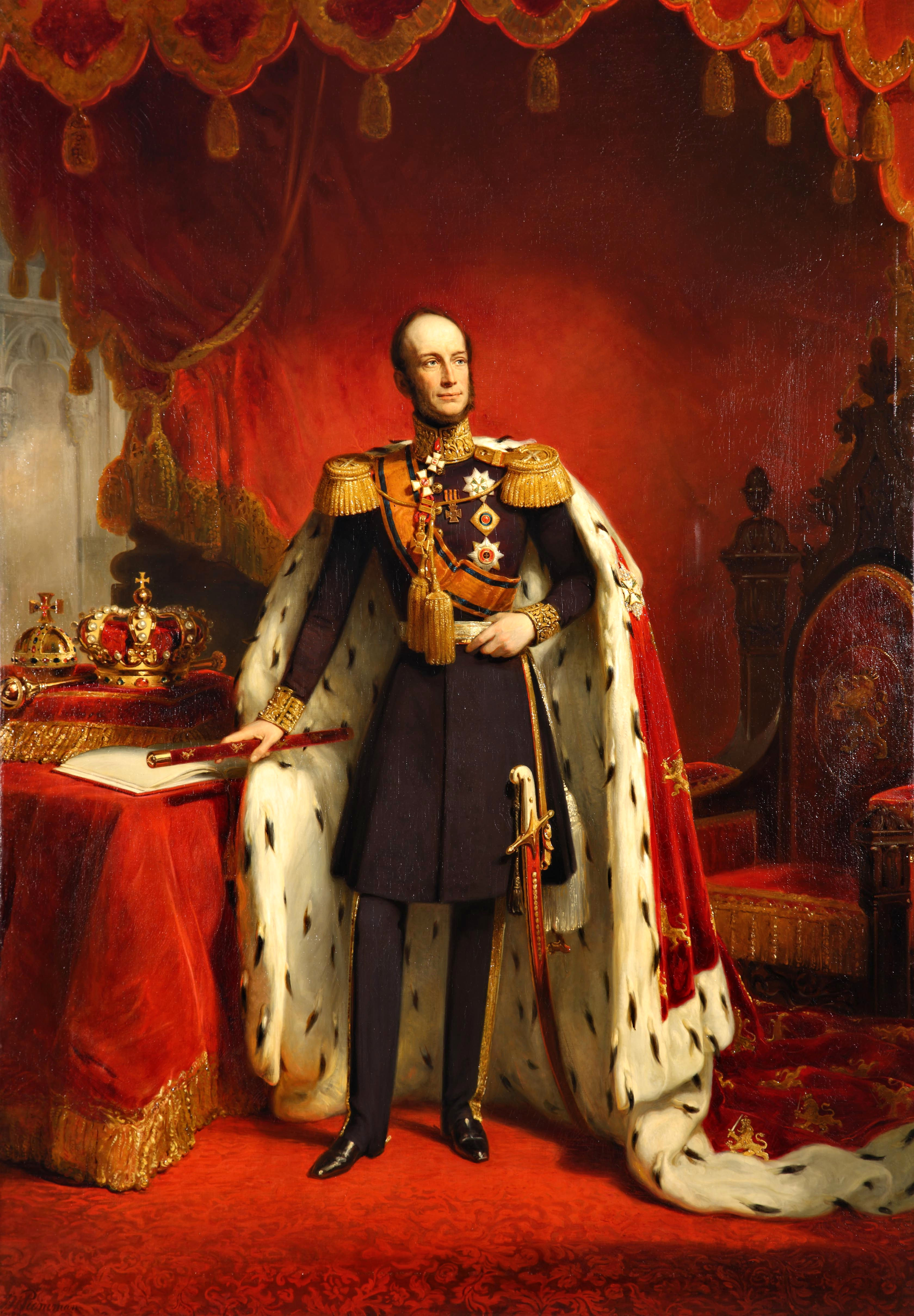
William II conceded powers to the Dutch Parliament.

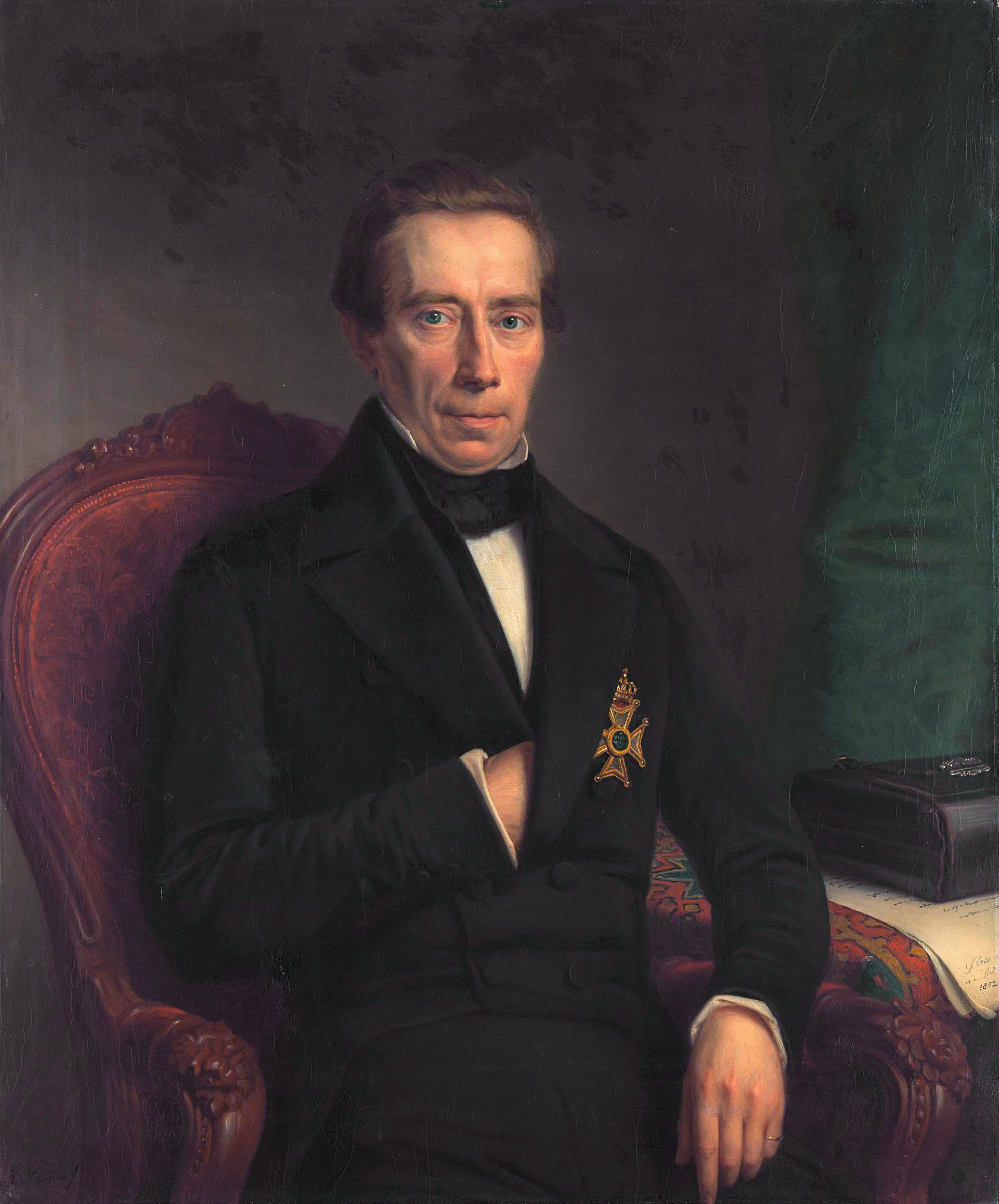
Johan Rudolf Thorbecke led the constitutional reform.

William II, who was more popular than his father, was also more willing to listen to his advisors. When the Revolutions of 1848 raged throughout Europe, with nationalists and liberals revolting and sometimes killing noblemen and royals in the process, William II was genuinely concerned for his safety and to lose his powers. Overnight, he changed from a conservative to a liberal, and agreed to the far-reaching Constitutional Reform of 1848 on 11 October 1848. He accepted the introduction of full ministerial responsibility in the constitution, leading to a system of parliamentary democracy, with the House of Representatives directly elected by the voters within a system of single-winner electoral districts. Parliament was accorded the right to amend government law proposals and to hold investigative hearings. The States-Provincial, themselves elected by the voter, appointed by majorities for each province the members of the Senate from a select group of upper class citizens. A commission chaired by the liberal Thorbecke was appointed to draft the new proposed constitution, which was finished on 19 June. Suffrage was enlarged (though still limited to census suffrage), as was the bill of rights with the freedom of assembly, the privacy of correspondence, freedom of ecclesiastical organisation and the freedom of education.

In 1865, literary critic Conrad Busken Huet famously commented: "One may complain or be proud about it, since 1848 the Netherlands has in fact been a democratic republic with a prince from the House of Orange as hereditary president."

=== 1848–1890: Waning popularity ===
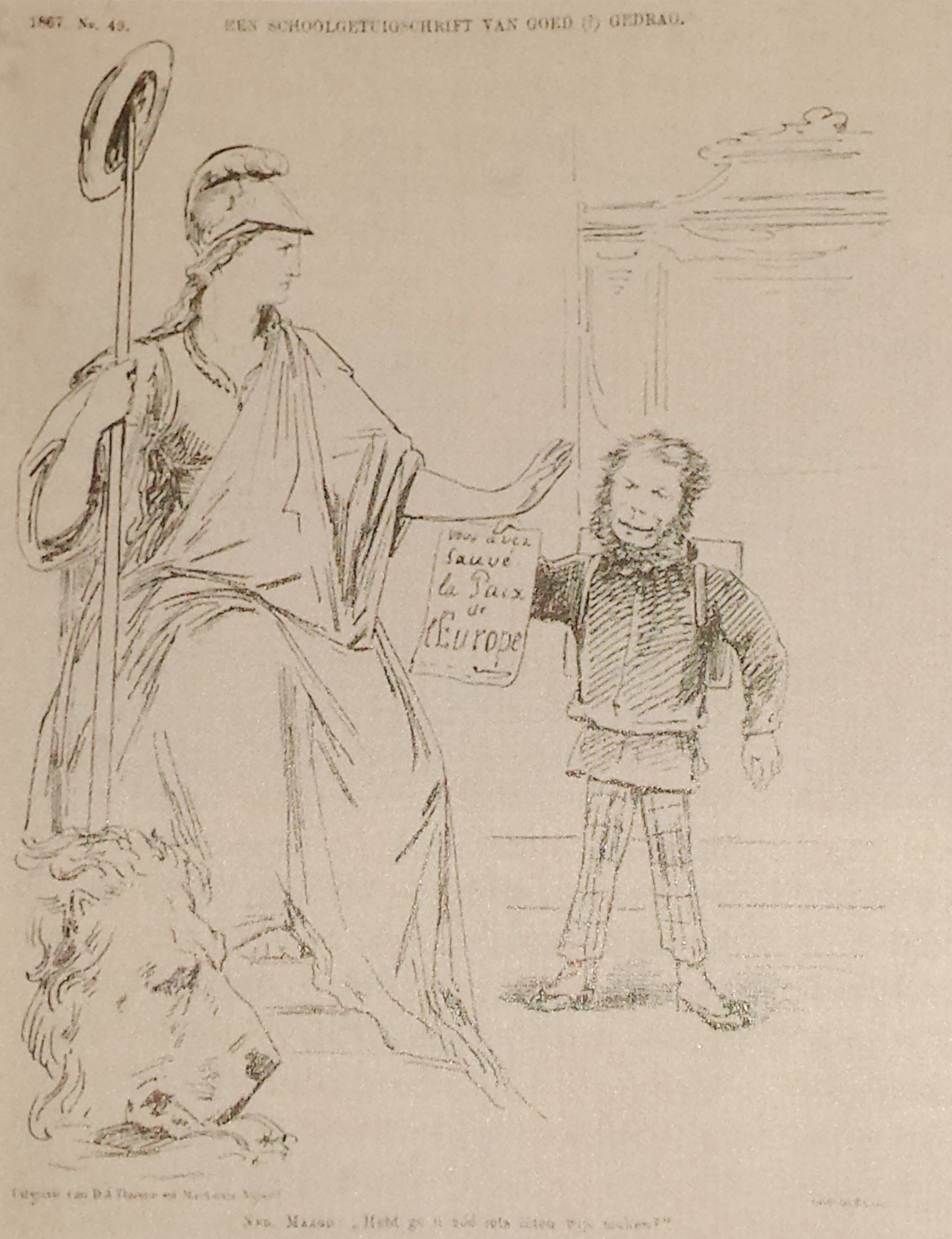
Cartoon mocking Van Zuylen van Nijevelt for needlessly dragging the Netherlands into William's personal diplomatic conflict

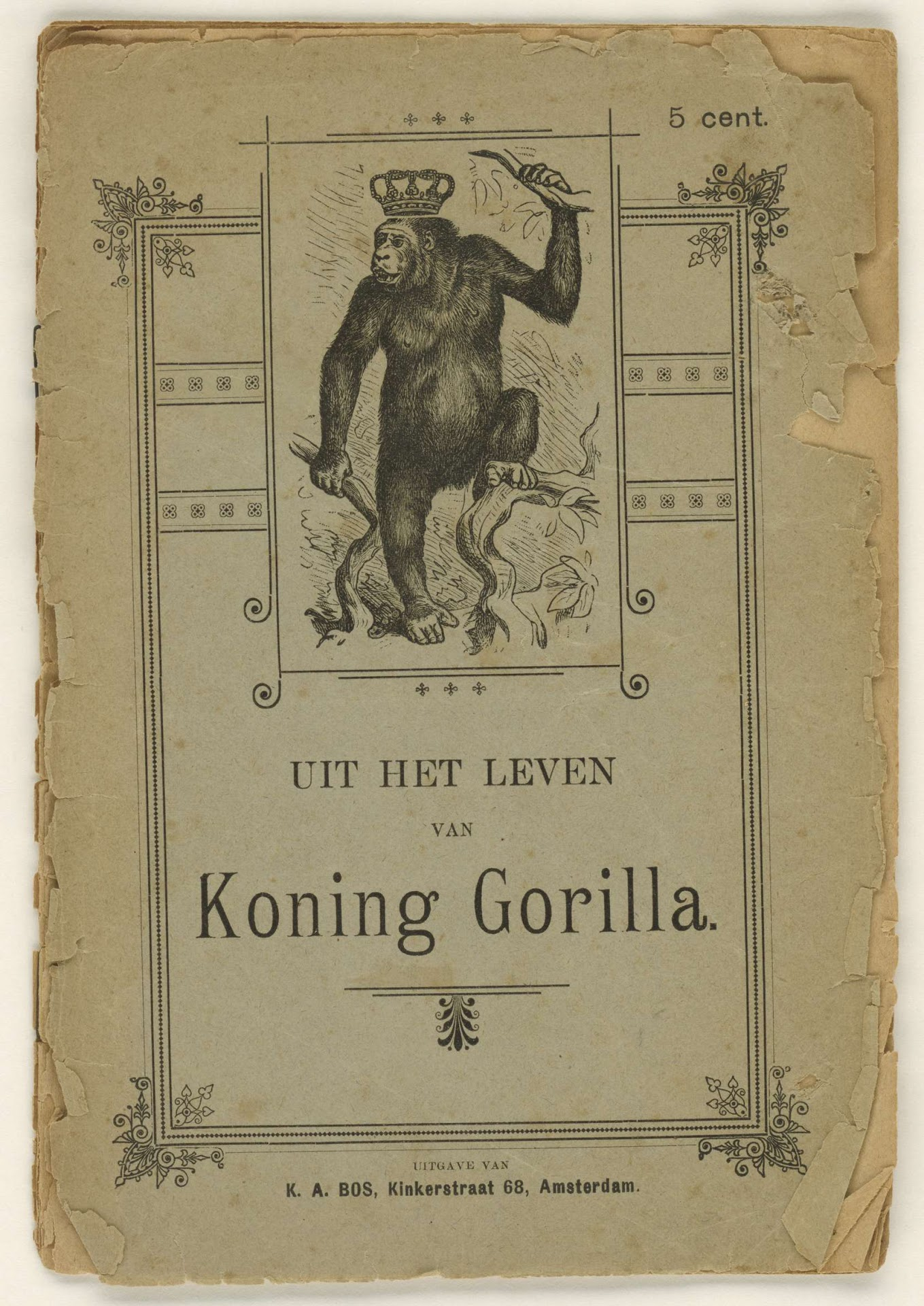
An 1887 anonymous libel against William III, dubbed "King Gorilla"

During the reign of William III, the Dutch royal house's popularity waned, because William III had much trouble complying to the Constitutional Reform of 1848. He would rather exert the same power as his predecessors did. In 1866, after the Second Thorbecke cabinet, he formed a conservative cabinet. That cabinet was immediately voted out in the House of Representatives over the controversial royal appointment of Pieter Mijer to Governor-General of the Dutch East Indies. Instead of dismissing the cabinet, the king dissolved Parliament and organised new elections. All voters received a letter that urged them to vote conservative. Although the conservatives won, they did not attain a majority. Nevertheless, the cabinet did not step down.

==== Luxembourg Crisis ====
In 1867, William attempted to sell Luxembourg to France, to both restore the European balance of power after the unexpected Austrian defeat in the Austro-Prussian War (1866), and alleviate his personal financial troubles. His decision greatly angered Prussia (artificially agitated by Chancellor Otto von Bismarck), triggering the Luxembourg Crisis. Prime Minister Julius van Zuylen van Nijevelt was able to prevent war between Prussia, the Netherlands and France by hosting a conference between the Great Powers, resulting in the Treaty of London (1867). The cabinet was heavily criticised by the liberals in Parliament, because it had threatened the Netherlands' neutrality whilst it should have stayed out of the matter, which was William's sole responsibility as the Grand Duke of Luxembourg. Parliament rejected the cabinet's foreign budget plans in November, leading the cabinet to offer its resignation to King William, but the furious William decided to dissolve Parliament instead. The newly elected House of Representatives maintained its opposition and again rejected the foreign budget, and approved the motion-Blussé van Oud-Alblas, condemning the needless dissolution of Parliament that had not served the country's interests in any way. This time the cabinet did step down, resulting in a parliamentary victory. The Luxembourg Crisis confirmed the parliamentary system's working, and reduced the royal influence on politics:
1. Ministers have to have Parliament's trust;
2. Using the budget right, Parliament can force Ministers to step down;
3. The King can only exercise his right to appoint or fire Ministers if the majority of Parliament agrees;
4. The government can dissolve one or both Houses of Parliament in case of a conflict; however, if the new Parliament maintains its old standpoint, the government has to give in.

==== Dynastic troubles ====
The king's personal life was a frequent source of discontent not just amongst Dutch politicians and occasionally the populace, but also abroad (he became exceptionally notorious for his exhibitionism at Lake Geneva). His solitary decision, a few weeks after Queen Sophie of Württemberg's death, to raise French opera singer Émilie Ambre to 'comtesse d'Ambroise', granting her a luxurious residence in Rijswijk and expressing the intent to marry her without the cabinet's consent, led to political upheaval. His cousin Prince Frederick demanded William to abdicate if he were to continue his plans. Eventually, William conceded and married 20-year-old Emma of Waldeck and Pyrmont instead. All of these actions gave the monarchy a bad name, so much so that throughout the 1880s there were serious calls to abolish the kingship. Outspoken republican writers, journalists and their publishers were increasingly Socialist such as Ferdinand Domela Nieuwenhuis (together with Sicco Roorda van Eysinga thought to be behind the 1887 anonymous libel against William III, titled From the life of King Gorilla). Unlike his father though, William III would not pay to keep his critics silent, but had them arrested and jailed or exiled. Seeing the rise of Socialism as a threat, several Liberals who had been traditionally republican, started the Orangist countermovement. The death of William III, who had no male successor (his sons William and Alexander died in 1879 and 1884, respectively), was seized on by Luxembourg to declare its independence by breaking the personal union with the Netherlands on the grounds of the lex Salica; however, via the Nassau-Weilburg branch, the monarchy was continued there.

=== 1890–1948: Recovery through reorientation ===
==== Succession secured, republic prevented ====
Queen-regent Emma of Waldeck and Pyrmont and Queen Wilhelmina were able to recover much of the popular support lost under William III. They successfully changed the role of the royal family to symbolise the nation's unity, determination, and virtue. In 1890, when Wilhelmina took office, rumours were spread by Socialist satirical magazine De Roode Duivel ("The Red Devil") that William III was not her real father, but Emma's confidant Sebastiaan Mattheus Sigismund de Ranitz (1846-1916). This would undermine the legitimacy of Wilhelmina's reign. Although no hard evidence exists for the allegations, and the consensus amongst historians is that they are false, the rumours were stubborn, and still feature in conspiracy theories circulating in republican circles. (Note: The royal detective Koningskind (2011) by Rob van Hoorn and the thriller IV (2013) by Arjen Lubach both revolve around a fictional investigative journalist who tries finding out whether someone other than William III (perhaps De Ranitz) was the actual father of Wilhelmina, which might result in a constitutional crisis.) The author of the rumour, the later parliamentarian and senator Louis Maximiliaan Hermans, was sentenced to six months imprisonment for lèse-majesté in 1895 for a different article and cartoon in De Roode Duivel, mocking the two queens. There were considerably more concerns over the royal dynasty's future, when Wilhelmina's marriage with Duke Henry of Mecklenburg-Schwerin (since 1901) repeatedly resulted in miscarriage. Had the House of Orange died out, the throne would likely have passed to Prince Heinrich XXXII Reuss of Köstritz, leading the Netherlands into an undesirable strong influence of the German Empire that would threaten Dutch independence. Not just Socialists, but now also Anti-Revolutionary politicians including Prime Minister Abraham Kuyper and Liberals such as Samuel van Houten advocated the restoration of the Republic in Parliament in case the marriage remained childless. The birth of Princess Juliana in 1909 put the question to rest.

==== Failed Socialist revolution ====
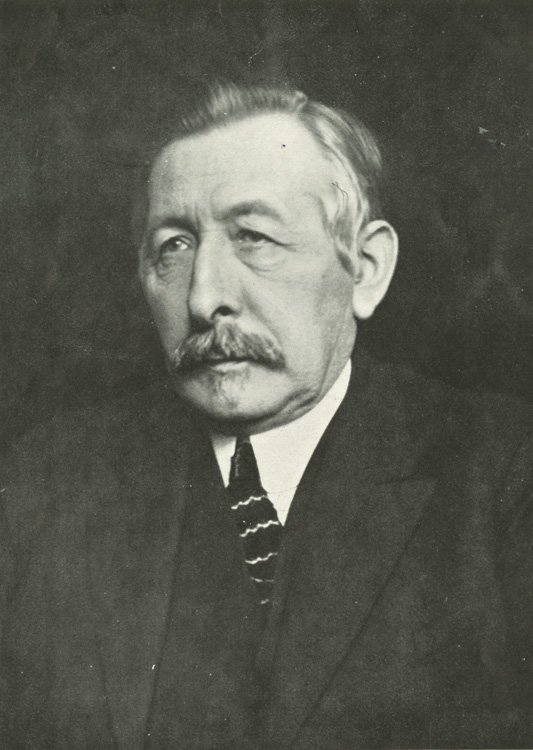
Pieter Jelles Troelstra, socialist leader

In Red Week of November 1918, at the end of the First World War, the attempt by activist Pieter Jelles Troelstra to launch a Socialist revolution after the examples elsewhere in Europe, failed. Instead, mass demonstrations in favour of the house of Orange were held, most notably on the Malieveld in The Hague on 18 November 1918, where Queen Wilhelmina, Prince Henry and the young Princess Juliana were cheered on by thousands of people waving orange flags. After Troelstra's mistake, most Socialists and Social Democrats gradually became monarchists during the 1920s and 1930s. At the birth of Princess Irene on 5 August 1939, SDAP party leader Koos Vorrink declared: 'For the overwhelming majority of the Dutch people, the national unity and our national tradition are symbolised in the persons of the House of Orange-Nassau. That fact has now been accepted without reservation by the Social Democratic Workers' Party.' Three days later, several Socialist Ministers took office for the first time in the Netherlands.

=== 1948–1980: Juliana period ===
==== Greet Hofmans affair ====
After the war, the royal house was plagued by affairs, most notably of faith healer Greet Hofmans, who managed to exert excessive control over the new Queen Juliana during 1948–1956. Hofmans divided the royal court into two camps before being forcibly removed after Juliana's husband, Prince Bernhard, leaked information on the power struggle to the German magazine Der Spiegel. But because the Labour Party (PvdA, successor of the SDAP) and all other parties to its political right defended the monarchy in times of need, it was generally relatively safe from threats.

==== Beatrix–Claus marriage controversy ====
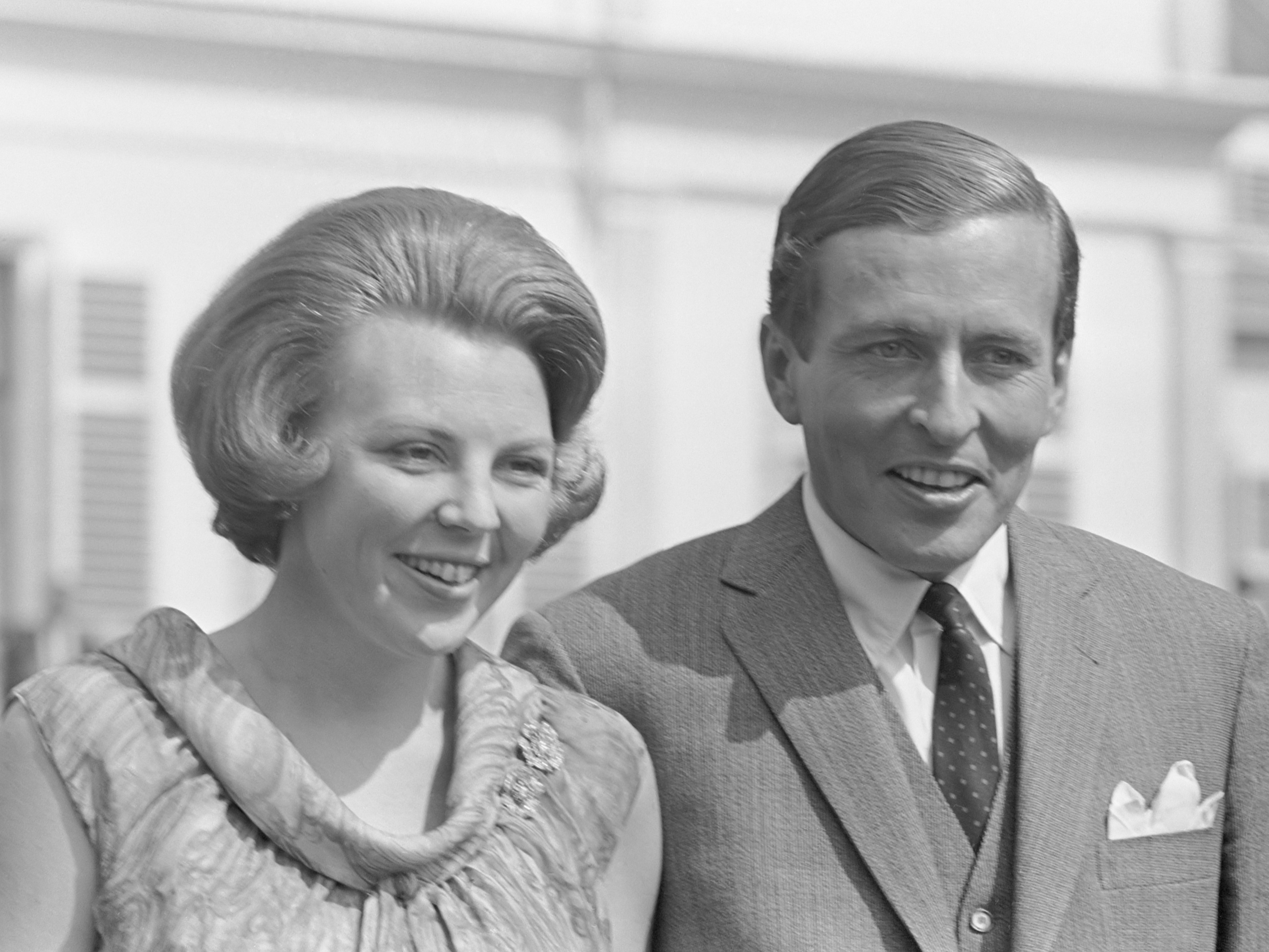
Crown Princess Beatrix and Klaus von Amsberg, shortly after their engagement was announced

A brief peak in republicanism was caused by the announced engagement of Crown Princess Beatrix to the German nobleman Klaus von Amsberg on 10 June 1965. Although he had been member of the Hitler Youth and briefly served in the Wehrmacht, an official investigation concluded he had not committed any war crimes. The States-General granted him Dutch citizenship as Claus van Amsberg and approved of the affiance. Nevertheless, the general public still resented the German occupation and oppression during the war, and a significant portion of the population opposed the marriage. On the occasion of the marriage, 109 years after Eillert Meeter had published his anti-monarchist book in English, it was translated to Dutch as Holland, kranten, kerkers en koningen. Jewish organisations were offended that Amsterdam, where many Jews had been deported by the Nazis during the war, had been chosen as the wedding location, and the couple proposed Baarn instead, but the government insisted on the capital. The wedding day on 10 March 1966 saw violent protests, most notably by the anarchist-artist group Provo. They included such memorable slogans as "Claus, 'raus!" (Claus, get out!). The wedding carriage's ride to and from the church in Amsterdam, where the Provo movement had been stirring up trouble for quite some time, was disrupted by riots with smoke bombs and fireworks; one smoke bomb was thrown at the wedding carriage by a group of Provos. According to several newspapers, there were about a thousand rioters. Many of them chanted "Revolution!" and "Claus, 'raus!". Crowd control barriers and flagpoles were overthrown, bikes and mopeds thrown on the streets, and in the Kalverstraat a car was pushed over. For a time, it was thought that Beatrix would be the last monarch of the Netherlands. However, over time, Claus became accepted by the public.

==== Rise of republican parties ====
Until 1965, there were two small explicitly republican parties present in the House of Representatives, both left-wing: the Pacifist Socialist Party (PSP) and the Communist Party of the Netherlands (CPN). The engagement of Beatrix and Claus in June 1965 was seized upon by the PSP to stress its republican ideas more strongly, but the CPN harshly condemned the PSP's "principally republican" stance in an open letter, stating it considered "the threat of German revanchism" to be much more serious, and "everything that distracts from that, is repulsive." The engagement further inspired the foundation of a number of new parties, of which Democrats 66 would become the most successful.

On 22 December 1965, the Republican Party Netherlands was founded by Arend Dunnewind and others in Rotterdam. Late February, Prime Minister Jo Cals responded to a concerned RPN letter, assuring them that civil servants could sign up for party membership without being fired. Already in January 1966 a schism occurred and the two splinters registered separately at the Election Council (Kiesraad) in October, although they were already negotiating a reconciliation by then. Eventually, they decided not to participate in the 1967 general election.

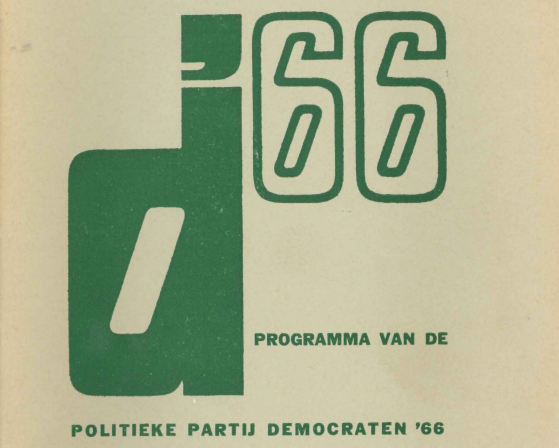
Political programme D'66 leaflet, 1966

Amsterdam Liberal Party (VVD) council member Hans Gruijters refused to attend the wedding reception ("I've got better things to do"), and later criticised the police actions against the protesters. The royalist VVD leadership reprimanded him, after which Gruijters discontentedly left the party. Together with Hans van Mierlo, Erik Visser, Peter Baehr and others, he decided it was time for political innovation. In the political programme of the new party D'66, founded on 14 October 1966, the need for 'radical democratisation' is discussed, meaning 'the voter directly chooses his government' and 'standards of democratic expediency should determine the form of government—monarchy or republic.' However, the party explained that 'the reason to change the form of government is currently not present', although it did seek to end the king's role in the cabinet formation.

Within the PvdA, the innovative "New Left" movement appeared, publishing the September 1966 manifesto Tien over Rood ("Ten About Red"), of which point 7 read: "It is desirable that the Netherlands become a republic as soon as queen Juliana's reign ends."

In October 1968, Klaas Hilberink founded the Republican Democrats Netherlands (RDN) in Hoogeveen, which shortly thereafter sought to merge with the Republican Party Netherlands. Hilberink reported in May 1970 that the RDN would partake in the 1971 general election, but this did not occur.

==== Lockheed scandal ====
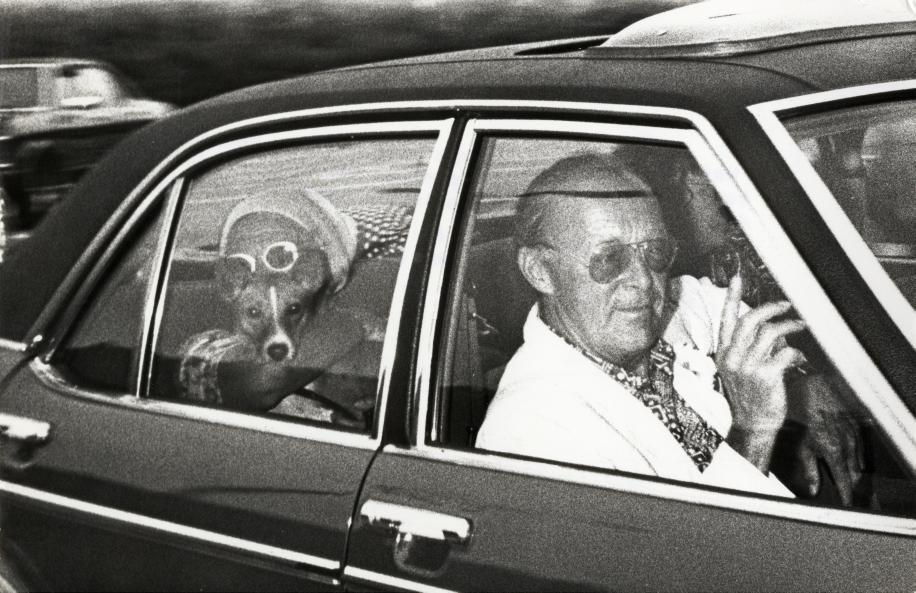
Prince Bernhard returning from his holiday due to PM Den Uyl's communiqué

In February 1976, the huge international Lockheed bribery scandals came out during public hearings by an investigative commission of the United States Congress. Key political and military people from West Germany, Italy, the Netherlands and Japan had been bribed by aircraft manufacturer Lockheed Martin. Prince Bernhard, Inspector-General of the Armed Forces, appeared to be the Dutch person involved: an inquiry by a Commission of Three showed that he had accepted bribes to the value of 1.1 million guilders to try to persuade Defence to purchase Lockheed aircraft (specifically, the Lockheed P-3 Orion). On 20 August, the Den Uyl cabinet convened a crisis meeting, during which the Commission of Three's conclusions were unanimously confirmed, and earnest discussions ensued over which measures should be taken, and the consequences they would have for the queenship of Juliana, who would have threatened to abdicate if her husband were to be prosecuted. A minority of ministers, especially Henk Vredeling (Defence, PvdA), found that prosecution was necessary; Hans Gruijters (D66) even argued that the monarchy should be relinquished. However, a majority, including PvdA Ministers who were publicly critical about the monarchy, opined that the constitutional establishment could not be endangered and order should return as soon as possible, and feared to lose the vote of the still mostly royalist population during the next elections, in case prosecution were to be pursued. Because Bernhard had, according to the government, damaged the state's interests through his actions, he was honourably discharged from his most prominent military functions by Royal Decree on 9 September 1976; he was also no longer allowed to wear his uniform at official events. According to Cees Fasseur, this was "the last great scandal that shook the monarchy to its foundations." In 1977, the PvdA included in its party platform a statement (Part II, Article 4) that it sought to introduce an elected head of state, thereby henceforth officially striving to abolish the monarchy. The PvdA overwhelmingly won the 1977 elections, but failed to form a new government. It is likely that Juliana would have already abdicated in 1978 if there would have been a second Den Uyl cabinet.

=== Change of throne 1980 ===
==== Discussion on republic silenced ====
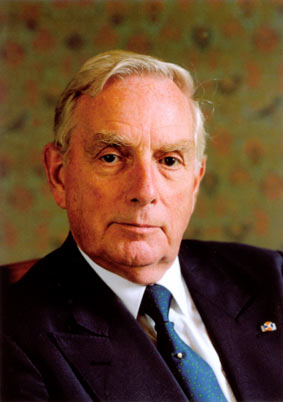
Korthals Altes: "The bond between the House of Orange and the Netherlands is above any discussion."

When Juliana announced her abdication on 31 January 1980, discussions on the form of government resurfaced in purple political circles, in which republican members, mainly from the youth wings, clashed with the royalist party boards. A motion by the Young Socialists, urging the PvdA to act on its goal of a republic as stated in the party platform, was rejected by the party council and thus not voted on. After a Young Liberals (JOVD) commission declared that an elected head of state would be 'desirable', the JOVD main board declared that the JOVD "has no need for a different form of government" at all, "seeing the excellent manner in which queen Juliana has performed her work." VVD chair Frits Korthals Altes said he regretted the JOVD commission's statement, arguing monarchism is not a matter of political opinion, but of 'being Dutch' (implying republicans are not Dutch), and moreover claiming: 'The bond between the House of Orange and the Netherlands is above any discussion.' In response to clamour for discussion on the most desirable form of government from D'66 members, D'66 parliamentary leader Jan Terlouw said discussion itself was good, but wondered "whether striving towards the theoretically best is also the most desirable", concluding that as long as everything works alright, there is no reason for change. The D'66 main board distanced itself from the anti-monarchist statements.

According to a February 1980 Algemeen Dagblad survey, only 67% of Dutch citizens had 'much confidence' in Beatrix as the new queen (higher amongst Christian Democrats (CDA) and Liberals, lower amongst D'66 and especially PvdA voters), but 89% remained in favour of the monarchy, 6% had no preference, and only 5% were convinced republicans (CDA and VVD: 3%; PvdA: 11%; D'66: 2%). According to NIPO, 12% favoured a republic and 88% the monarchy. Ex-provo Roel van Duijn said he expected tough actions against the monarchy during the investiture, even more fierce than in 1966 when he led them himself.

==== Coronation riots ====
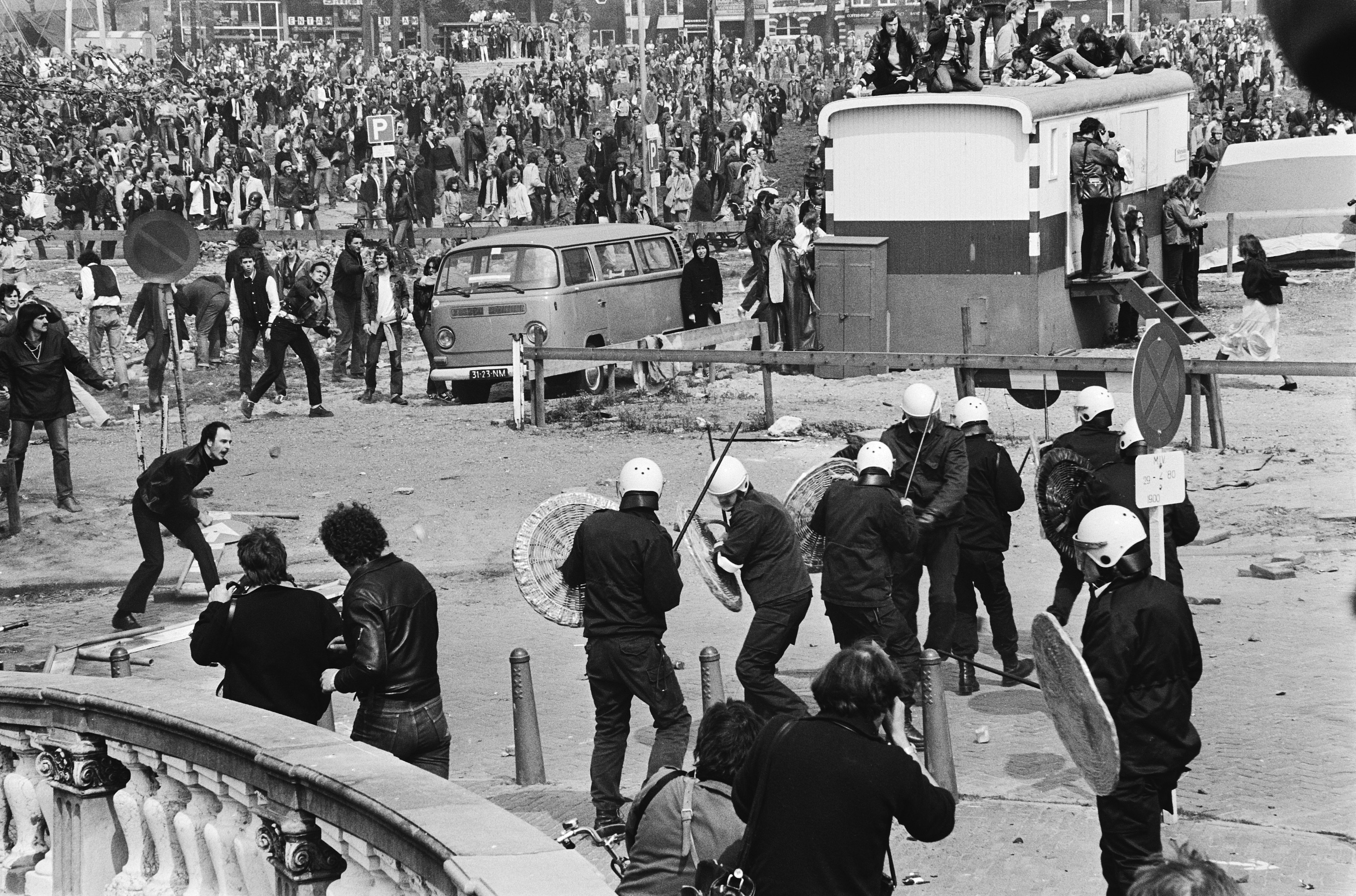
The "Battle of the Blauwbrug" between protesters and police during the coronation riots

On 30 April 1980, Queen Juliana abdicated in favour of her daughter Beatrix in Amsterdam. That day, squatters chose to protest en masse, because they felt their demands for more housing were not being met by the government, whilst millions were spent renovating royal palaces (Royal Palace of Amsterdam and Noordeinde Palace). The protesters' slogan was "Geen woning, geen kroning!" ("No housing, no coronation!"). (Note: Strictly speaking, there is no 'coronation' in the Netherlands, as the monarch is not actually crowned. Instead, one speaks of inhuldiging ("investiture"). But because the slogan rhymed and was easy to remember, it caught on, and thus gave the event its name.) The squatters teamed up with republicans, autonomists and anarchists, intending to squat several houses or disrupt the coronation ceremony to make their demands heard. Throughout the day, that was intended as a national celebration of the monarchy, parts of Amsterdam were engulfed in these so-called "Coronation Riots". There were hundreds of injured rioters and policemen, and millions of guilders in damage. The coronation was not interrupted, however, and although it envigorated the squatter movement to radicalise, the event did not inspire a specifically republican movement. The riots, as well as most earlier and later protests against the monarchy, were part of a general anti-establishment attitude that originated in the 1960s.

=== 1990s: Republican societies form ===
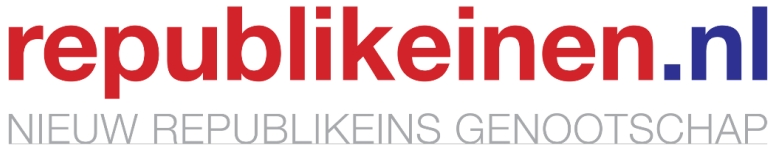
Logo of the New Republican Society

On 11 September 1996, the Republican Society (Republikeins Genootschap) was founded at Het Prinsenhof in Delft. This movement wants the Netherlands to become a republic, but does not undertake any actions to achieve it; rather, it expects this to happen naturally if the topic is discussed often enough in society. Unlike the general anti-establishment groups, its members came from within the established circles of science, business and journalism (later also politics and education), with the abolishment of the monarchy as its specific and sole goal. At first, the Republican Society decided to operate in secret, but in February 1997, the minutes of its foundational meeting were leaked to de Volkskrant, initiating a huge national media storm. Although the overwhelming majority of initial reactions was negative, the premature revelation of the Republican Society's mere existence succeeded in breaking the taboo of questioning the monarchy by sparkling nationwide public discussion on the Dutch form of government. However, due to its exclusivity and lack of activities, several dissatisfied republicans founded the New Republican Society (Nieuw Republikeins Genootschap, NRG) in 1998. Members of the NRG do organise actions against the monarchy. However, both groups are currently relatively marginal in Dutch society: the RG does have many prominent members, but not a large following; the NRG had about 2000 members in April 2013.

=== 1999–2013: Abolishment vs. modernisation ===
==== Willem-Alexander–Máxima marriage controversy ====
When it became public in 1999 that Crown Prince Willem-Alexander was in relationship with Máxima Zorreguieta, the royal house came under fire, mainly because Máxima's father Jorge Zorreguieta had been Secretary of State in the repressive Argentinian military regime of Jorge Videla during the Dirty War (1976–1981). Even before there was any official announcement of a marriage, Democrats 66 (D66) and especially GreenLeft and the Socialist Party (SP) responded critically, and demanded Máxima to publicly distance herself from the Argentinian regime to be allowed to marry Willem-Alexander. In 1997, Willem-Alexander had said in an interview that if Parliament would not approve his choice of bride, he would relinquish his kingship. Research showed that popular interest in Máxima was limited, and one found there was too much media coverage about the revelation; initially, one half of the Dutch people favoured a potential marriage, the other half opposed. Sociologist Pim Fortuyn wrote that the issue illustrated 'that the royal house is an institute from a past age'. In January 2000, the royal house still officially denied any marriage was in preparation.

==== 2000: Parliamentary debates ====
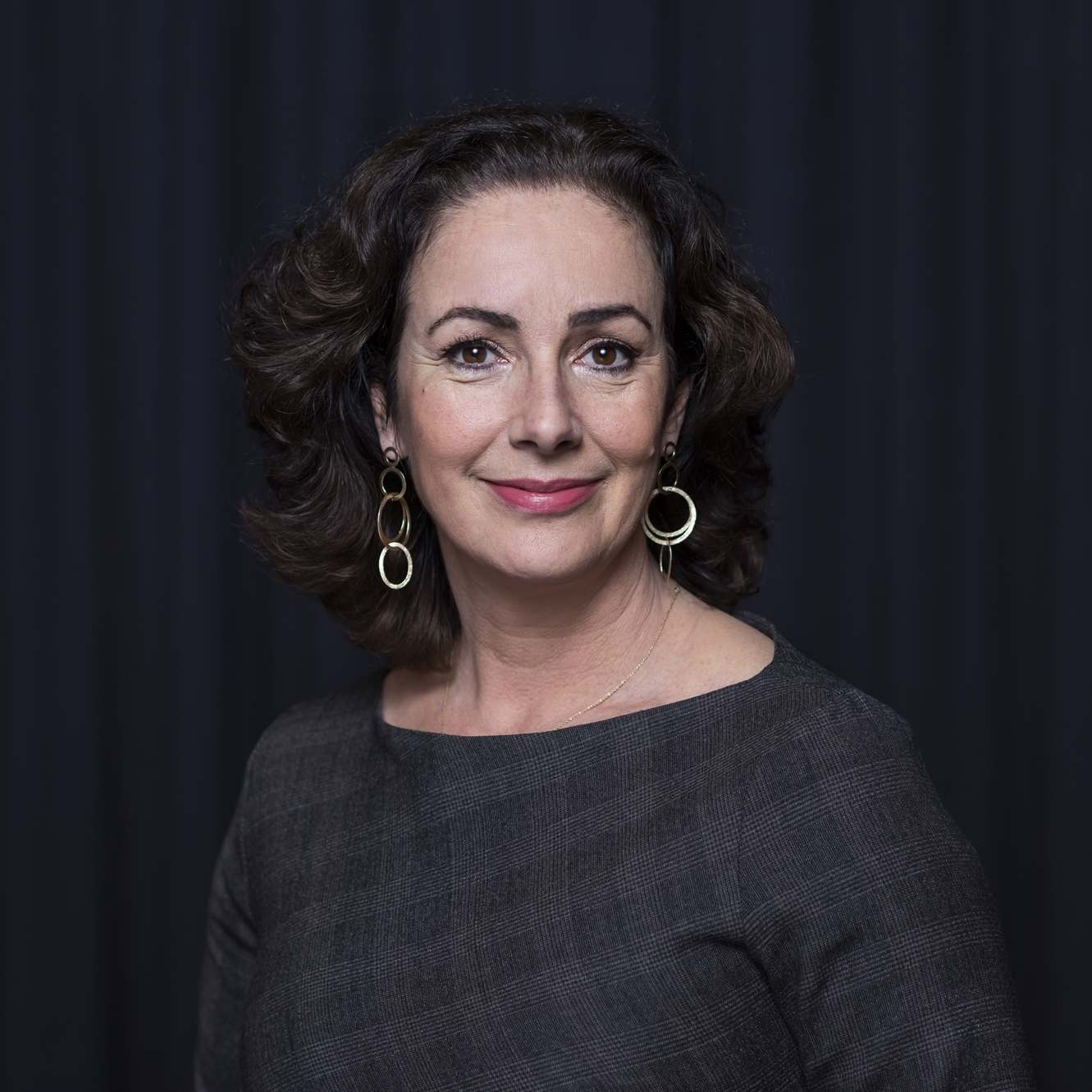
Femke Halsema: "Hereditary kingship does not, in my view, fit within a democracy."

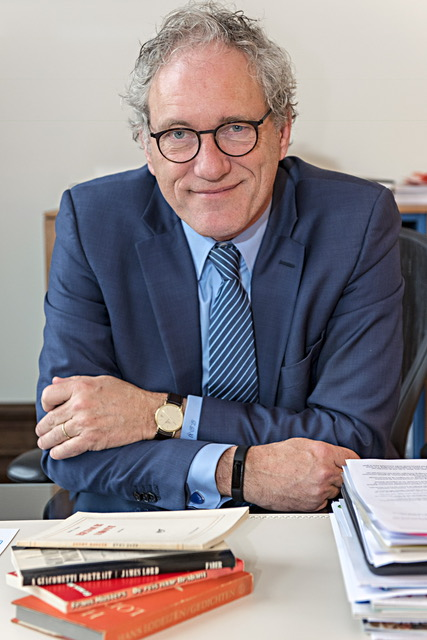
Thom de Graaf: "Certain aspects of the kingship are antiquated."

During the PvdA knowledge festival in Nijmegen on 19 February 2000, it was decided that a working group for democratisation would be founded, with the introduction of an elected head of state as its primary issue, which almost all present were in favour of. Early March 2000, MP Femke Halsema (GreenLeft) called for discussion on abolishing the monarchy, because according to her 'the time is ripe', and she pleaded for the establishment of a parliamentary republic after the German model. Even though an elected head of state was in the election programme of GreenLeft, fraction leader Paul Rosenmöller said he found it 'no urgent matter'. D66 leader Thom de Graaf, opining in April 2000 that there was not enough momentum for a republic, instead presented a plan for a 'modern kingship' as an alternative: the king should be 'at a distance, but have authority', comparable to the German president. According to him, the king's membership of the government, chairmanship of the Council of State, role as initiator of the formation and signer of laws was 'outdated', but De Graaf was also against a completely ceremonial Swedish model. GreenLeft, including both Halsema and Rosenmöller, backed De Graaf. The response from the PvdA, which at the time stated in its party platform that the royal house should be replaced by an elected head of state, was disunited: Prime Minister Wim Kok was open to discussion, but said he did not intend to 'change anything about the head of state's constitutional position', as did former Queen's Commissioner Roel de Wit and MP Peter Rehwinkel; other PvdA members such as senator Erik Jurgens spoke in favour of modernisation, still others went a step further and advocated for a republic, such as senator Willem Witteveen, party ideologue Paul Kalma and professor Maarten Hajer. A TNS NIPO survey showed that 27% of the population agreed with De Graaf's plea for modernisation, whilst 67% opposed changing the kingship, and 6% wanted an even stronger kingship. In total, 90% wanted to maintain the monarchy, although 44% agreed with Halsema that hereditary succession was 'outdated'; however, another 44% did not see hereditary succession as a problem at all. On 9 May, De Graaf requested the government to produce a memorandum about the modernisation of the kingship, in which D66 was supported by the PvdA, the SP and GreenLeft (together 75 MPs, 50%). However, the VVD, the CDA and the small Christian fractions (also 75 MPs combined) did not feel the need for a memorandum (although they would not block a discussion on the topic), and Prime Minister Kok said he would only discuss his views on modernisation of the monarchy during his explanation of the General Affairs's budget on Prinsjesdag. On Prinsjesdag 2000, Kok made no proposals to the effect of amending the kingschap; he merely suggested that after elections, Parliament itself could host a consultative debate on who should be appointed informateur, but the eventual choice would remain a royal privilege. D66 responded with disappointment. In November 2000, a tight majority of the D66 party congress backed De Graaf's proposal, whilst over a third of the members voted for a republic.

==== Towards a more ceremonial kingship? ====
ProRepublica logo

Henk Kamp and Wouter Bos were the first informateurs commissioned by the House rather than the queen.

In the 2000s, the royal house had little to fear from republicans, who generally limited themselves to ludic activism and writing opinion pieces. Several more republican initiatives emerged, including ProRepublica, the New Republican Fellowship, the Republican Socialists and the Republican Platform. It is unclear if these are still active. The Republican People's Party (1994–2003) partook in the 2002 general election, but failed to gain any seats. There has also been a Republican Modern Party (RmP) since 2000, though it lacks the required number of members to run in elections.

Support for the monarchy floated around 80%, unless members of the royal family engaged in dubious activities. Examples of these are when in 2000, Beatrix went on a winter sport holiday in Austria, that was boycotted by Europe at the time because Jörg Haider's Freedom Party was in government, or when Willem-Alexander and Máxima had a villa built in Mozambique in 2007, which they eventually abandoned under great pressure. Geert Wilders, leader of the new right-wing populist Party for Freedom (PVV), was displeased by the 2007 Christmas speech by Queen Beatrix, which he found biased and full of thinly veiled criticism of the PVV. Ever since, he has argued for the king/queen to be deprived of all political powers, but also to maintain a purely ceremonial kingship, although some suspect the PVV and/or Wilders to actually be republican. According to a survey by Maurice de Hond from 2014, the percentage of convinced republican is twice as high amongst PVV voters (29%) than the general public (15%), but still a minority.

The costs of the royal house continued to be controversial; the parliamentary opposition succeeded in getting these more transparent, and somewhat confine them. A growing percentage of the population indicated they desired a purely ceremonial kingship, and in the House, several parliamentary groups made efforts to confine the formal and informal powers of the monarch, and to reduce the royal house's subsidies. The most important step in this direction was taken during the 2012 government formation, when the House itself took the initiative to appoint a "scout" (verkenner), and later two informateurs, bringing the traditional privilege of the monarch to lead the cabinet formation to an end. The inauguration of Ministers and State Secretaries, too, was conducted in public for the first time for the sake of transparency, despite objections by queen Beatrix.

==== "It is 2013" movement ====
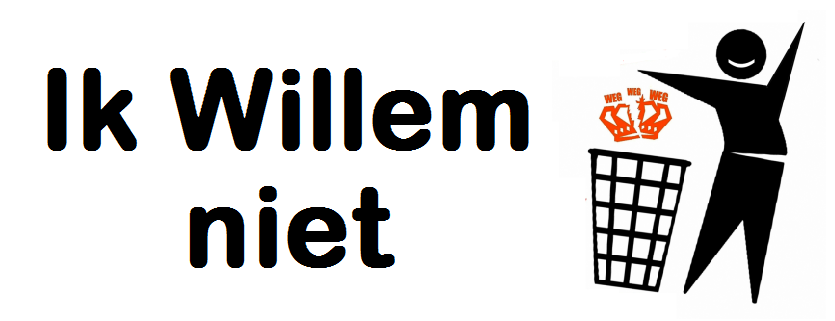
2013 republican sign protesting the investiture of Willem-Alexander, simultaneously stating "I don't want him" and "I don't want Willem"

In the run-up to the investiture of Willem-Alexander on 30 April 2013, Utrecht student Joanna suddenly made headlines when she protested with a cardboard sign reading 'Weg met de monarchie. Het is 2013' ("Down with the monarchy. It is 2013") in the presence of Queen Beatrix, after which she was removed by the police, violating her freedom of expression. The incident inspired the foundation of the anti-monarchist "It is 2013" movement, that together with the NRG wanted hold playful activities to call for a referendum on the abolition of the monarchy on 30 April. The police later admitted their mistake, and the soon-to-be-king Willem-Alexander remarked that on the day of his investiture "of course there will be room for dissent. There has to be. Nothing wrong with that." He commented that the police officer who removed Joanna probably made a mistake, but everyone can make mistakes and learn from them. Of the six protest locations assigned by the government of Amsterdam, one was used by republicans: the Waterlooplein. Joanna and NRG chairman Hans Maessen, who demonstrated individually against the monarchy, were arrested on Dam Square. The police later admitted the arrests were a mistake. Joanna claimed she had been "silenced". Since the investiture, Joanna and the "It is 2013" movement were rarely heard from again.

=== Recent developments ===
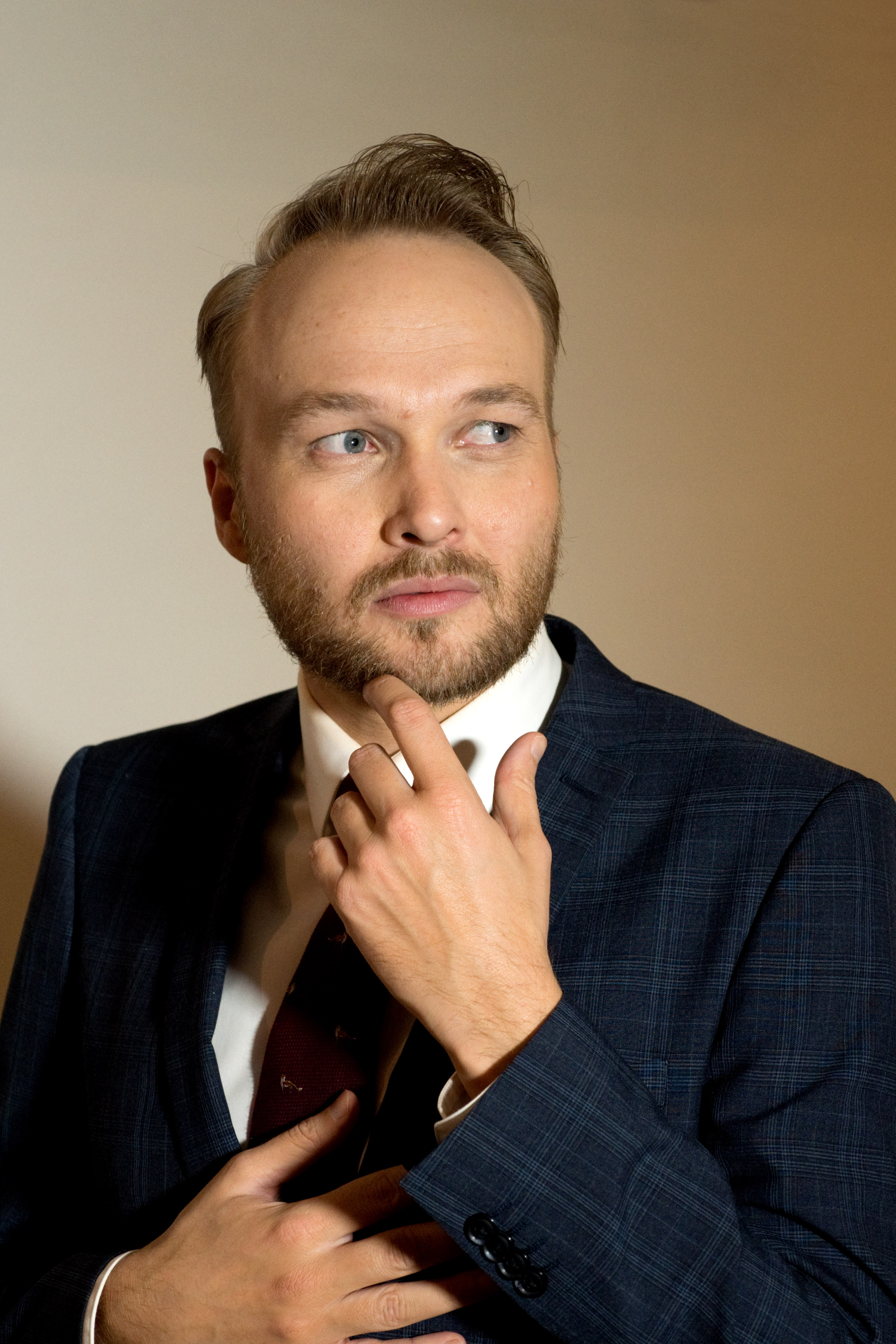
Arjen Lubach satirised the monarchy, proclaiming himself "Pharaoh of the Netherlands".

On 22 March 2015, during his satirical show Zondag met Lubach, comedian Arjen Lubach launched a satirical citizen's initiative to have himself proclaimed Pharaoh of the Netherlands. The initiative, intended as a statement against the monarchy (200 years after the coronation of King William I), obtained the necessary 40,000 signatures within 24 hours (helped by Lubach's appearance on De Wereld Draait Door on 23 March). Although it is unlikely the initiative will be put on the House of Representatives' agenda, Lubach did succeed in sparking a new national debate on the status of the monarchy as a form of government.

On 6 May 2015, the Openbaar Ministerie (OM) decided to prosecute activist Abulkasim Al-Jaberi, who was apprehended in November 2014 for publicly saying "Weg met de monarchie. Fuck de koning. Fuck de koningin. Fuck het koningshuis." ("Down with the monarchy. Fuck the king. Fuck the queen. Fuck the royal house."), which constituted lèse-majesté according to the OM. This led to spontaneous outrage on social media with people tweeting #fuckdekoning en masse, and the news media all reporting on the matter, triggering a Streisand effect. That night, the Royal Palace of Amsterdam was defaced with graffiti containing the phrase. On 20 May, king Willem-Alexander told American journalists that he would accept repealing the prohibition on lèse-majesté, regardless of his personal opinion, because "his tongue would fall off if he tried to comment on the issue because it is not in his power to discuss political issues." Debates resurfaced in March 2016, when German comedian Jan Böhmermann mocked Turkish president Erdogan. The House of Representatives resolved in April 2016 that the prohibition on insulting a foreign head of state or government member will be abolished, and discussion was resumed on the status of lèse-majesté. The articles in the Wetboek van Strafrecht which criminalised lèse-majesté were later abolished.

In 2020, the anti-monarchist Party for the Republic was founded. The party took part in the 2021 House of Representatives elections in two electoral districts with party leader Bruno Braakhuis and obtained a total of 255 votes, insufficient for a seat.

In 2022, a poll commissioned by a republican group showed that a small majority (51%) were in favour of the monarchy.

On the 14 October 2023, the GroenLinks-PvdA coalition voted by 52% in party's conference in Rotterdam to put out a supplementary platform for turning the Netherlands in a parliamentary republic.

== Arguments ==
In public debates on the monarchy, the following arguments, amongst others, are employed.

=== In favour of the monarchy ===
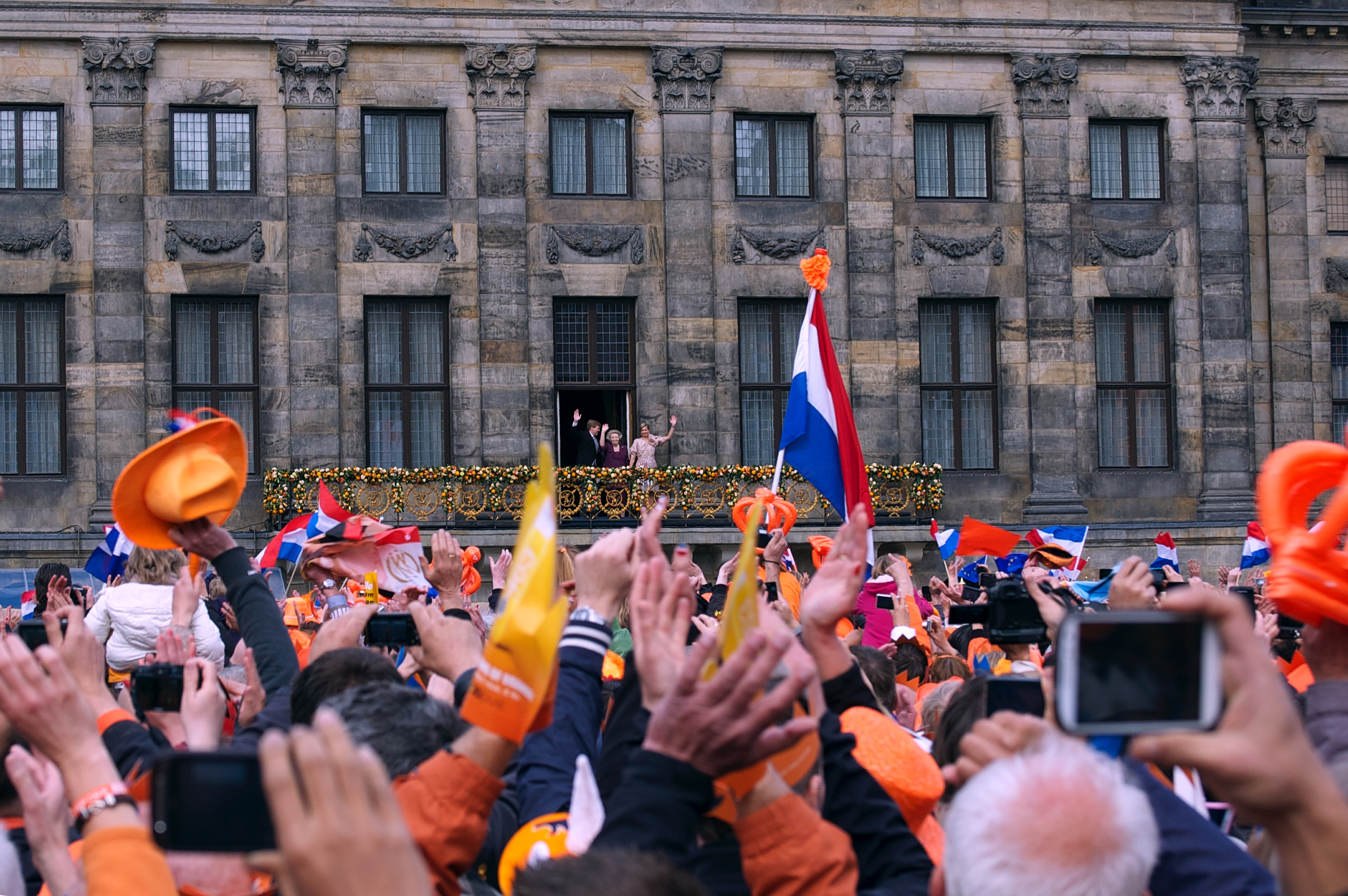
Crowd cheering at the royal family during the 2013 succession

- Past actions and tradition: Because of their actions in the past, dating back to the leading role of William of Orange and his direct offspring in the Eighty Years' War that eventually led to Dutch independence, the Orange-Nassau dynasty is entitled to rule the Netherlands by tradition.
  - Direct descent not required: Direct descent from William of Orange himself is not required, as long as the monarch is from the Orange-Nassau family. Furthermore, the claim that S.M.S. de Ranitz was Wilhelmina's father instead of William III is a discredited conspiracy theory.
- Dutch Republic's weaknesses: The Dutch Republic was too weak; it required a strong and stable head of state, which the Orange-Nassau stadtholders and later kings and queens were able provide. Also, republicans are contradicting themselves when they argue against tradition when claiming that the monarchy is 'outdated', whilst simultaneously appealing to tradition by pointing to the Dutch Republic as a better model, which however predated the 19th-century kingdom.
- Majority support: The monarchy is democratic, because (as of 2002) an overwhelming majority of Dutch citizens and political parties support it.
- Divine right of kings: The Christian God has granted the Orange-Nassau family the divine right to rule the Netherlands.
- Fairy tale: The royal house is a pretty fairy tale, and it often provides entertainment via gossip and sensational scandals.

=== In favour of a republic ===
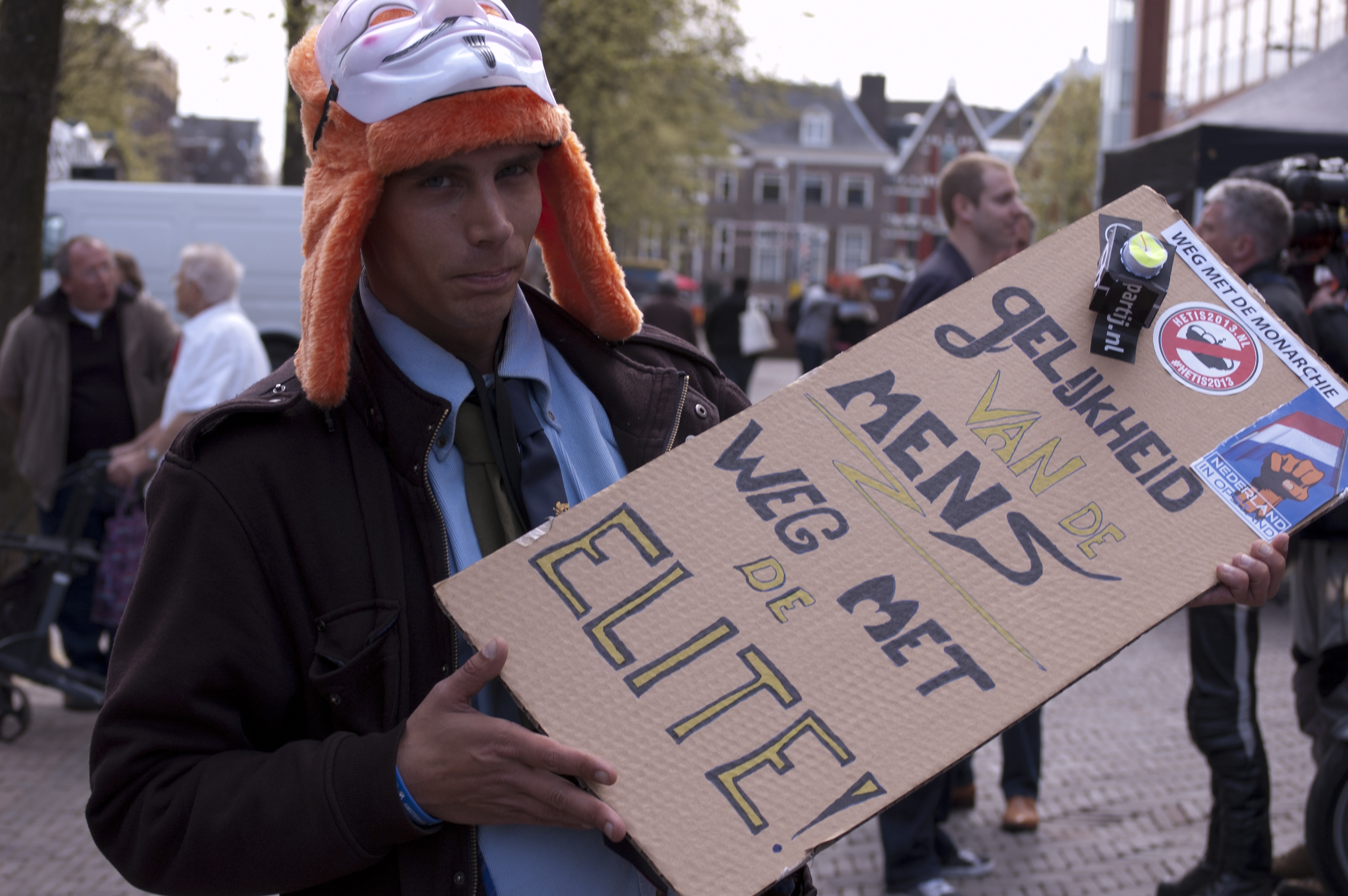
2013 republican protester: "Human equality. Down with the elite!"

- Equality and anti-tradition: Hereditary succession violates the principle of equality of all Dutch citizens (as stipulated in Article 1 and 3 of the Constitution); an appeal to tradition is no excuse.
  - No (direct) descent: The current royal family is not (directly) descended from William of Orange anyway, therefore it lacks legitimacy to rule.
- Dutch Republic's legitimacy: The Netherlands was founded as a republic, and should have remained so; William I unjustly appropriated the royal title in 1815, especially considering he had already forsaken his rights to the Netherlands in 1801 in exchange for the Principality of Nassau-Orange-Fulda (see Oranienstein Letters).
- Lack of democratic legitimacy: The monarchy's apparent popularity has only ever been measured in opinion polls, never in a formal referendum, the ultimate expression of democracy. Also, once deposed, there is nothing to prevent the ex-king or ex-queen from running for president or prime minister in elections, as Simeon Saxe-Coburg-Gotha successfully did in Bulgaria in 2001.
- No evidence of divine right: Even if the Christian God exists, there is no evidence that the Orange-Nassaus have been given a divine right, and even if they did, any God could also one day withdraw his or her grace from them (as he did with several Old Testament kings, or, according to the 1581 Act of Abjuration on which Dutch independence was based, with Philip II of Spain). Also, considering the secularisation of the Dutch population in recent centuries, fewer and fewer people take this argument seriously.
- Against superstition and elitism: The idea that a fairy tale (often mockingly called a "puppet-show") is required to appease the 'common people', shows an arrogant elitist contempt towards the 'dumb masses', who apparently do not deserve to emancipate themselves from myths. It also does not justify the alleged power plays the royal house is engaging in, nor the wasted taxpayer money lavished on a single family to provide them with a life of (unearned) exceptional wealth, privilege and luxury, which is further not enjoyed by the average Dutch citizen.
- Against the genetic criterion: The head of state shouldn't be selected with the genetic criterion. All Dutch should be equals at birth and with the same legal rights and potential.
- Cost: The royal family is paid 7.2 million euros per year in taxpayer money.

=== Common ground arguments ===
There are seemingly contradictory arguments put forward by both republicans and monarchists, that occasionally allows them to find common ground.

- Royals for President: Some republicans state they have nothing personal against individual members of the royal house, but simply oppose the monarchy based on the democratic principles that all politicians should be elected, be held accountable for their actions and impeachable. They would accept and perhaps even endorse and vote for royals running for president once the monarchy is abolished; slogans such as "Beatrix for President" date back to at least the 1980 Coronation Riots.
- Founded today, the Netherlands would become a republic: Some republicans have argued, and some monarchists have acknowledged, that nowadays it would be logical or appropriate to choose a republican form of government if one were to found a new state, or the current royal family, Orange-Nassau, would decide to 'quit their jobs'.

== Opinion polls ==
=== TNS NIPO ===
According to survey agency TNS NIPO, the Dutch monarchy has had about 90% support amongst the Dutch population since 1964, with a small peak in the mid-1990s. Between 1996 and March 2003, the call for a republic grew by 14% (5% > 19%), but the popularity of the monarchy stabilised after 2003 to 85% (2013). According to an April 2014 TNS NIPO survey commissioned by the Evangelische Omroep, it slightly increased to 89%.

What do you think is the best for our country: that the Netherlands remain a kingdom, or that the Netherlands become a republic?
% response	1964	1969	1976	1980	1995	1996	1999	2000	Mar '03	2004	2005	Apr '07	Nov '07	Apr '08	Apr '09	Apr '11	Apr '13	Apr '14
Monarchy	91	89	93	88	93	95	91	90	81	86	86	87	87	85	87	87	85	89
Republic	9	11	7	12	7	5	9	10	19	14	14	13	13	15	13	13	15	11

=== Maurice de Hond ===
In 2005, 2007 and since 2009 every year before Koningsdag, opinion pollster Maurice de Hond inquires people's attitudes towards the monarchy and a possible future republic. His results, which include the possibility of 'Don't know / no answer' show a relatively stable, but structurally lower preference for the monarchy than TNS NIPO: on average, 70% backs the monarchy, 25% is in favour of a republic, and 6% doesn't know or gives no answer.

Which form of government do you prefer?
% response	2005	2007	2009	2010	2011	2012	2013
It's best that the Netherlands remain a kingdom	74	71	66	67	69	70	72
It's best that the Netherlands become a republic	20	23	28	29	26	25	21
Don't know / no answer	6	6	6	5	5	6	6

In the run-up to the investiture of Willem-Alexander, De Hond carried out a survey commissioned by Hart van Nederland, which showed that 65% of Dutch people questioned were against a republic, and 22% in favour of a republic, whilst 13% had no opinion on the matter. However, half of participants opined the royal house was too expensive, whilst 42% did not think so.

=== Synovate ===
In an annual survey amongst 500 people above the age of 18, market research firm Synovate noted a small increase in republicanism between 2007 and 2011 from 14% to 18%. According to its last inquiry in September 2011, three quarters (73%) of the Dutch continued to support the monarchy, but the call for a modernised kingship without any political powers (37%) was on the rise as well. 45% thought the notion that the oldest child should automatically succeed the throne was "outdated".

What do you think is best: that the Netherlands remain a monarchy or become a republic with an elected president as head of state?
% response	2007	2008	2009	2010	Apr 2011	Sept 2011
The Netherlands should remain a monarchy	77	80	77	72	73	73
The Netherlands should become a republic	14	14	13	16	17	18
Don't know / no opinion	9	7	10	12	10	9

=== Ipsos ===
Since 2011, Ipsos (that bought Synovate that year) has annually conducted surveys commissioned by the NOS, showing an average 73% support for the monarchy. According to a September 2015 Ipsos survey, however, only half of about a thousand respondents supported the monarchy, 18% wanted to abolish it, 24% was neutral and 8% didn't know.

Should the Netherlands remain a monarchy, or do you want a republic?
% response	2011	2012	2013	2014	Apr 2015	Sept 2015
Monarchy	74	74	78	68	71	50
Republic	9	13	11	17	16	18
Don't know / no opinion	17	13	11	15	13	32

=== Others ===
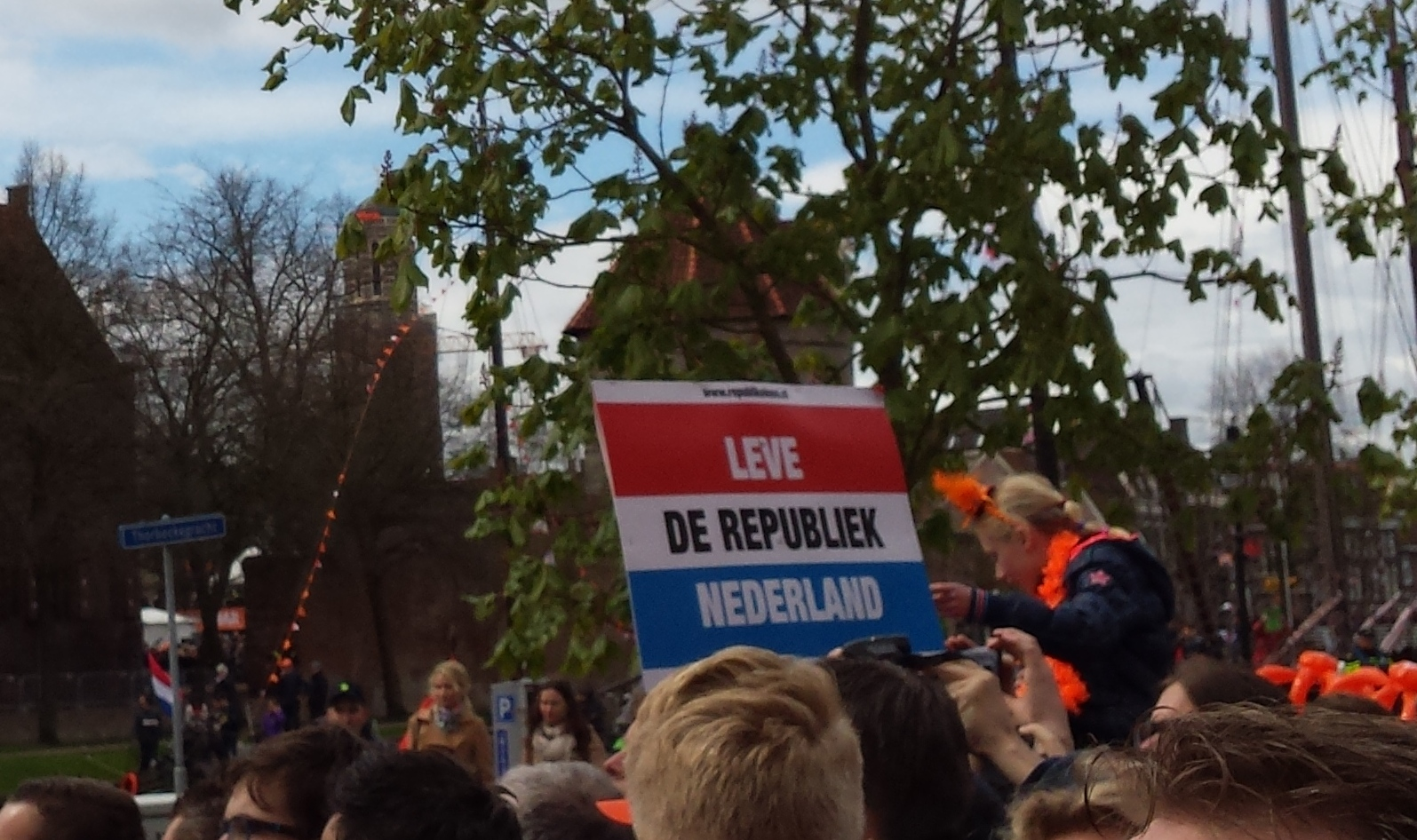
Republican protest at Koningsdag 2016 in Zwolle

In 2008, the Dienst Onderzoek en Statistiek of the government of Amsterdam held a survey, commissioned by the Nieuw Republikeins Genootschap, amongst 1210 Amsterdammers about the royal house. The research showed that according 35% of the people questioned, the political role of the monarchy should disappear. According to a further 23%, the monarchy as a whole should disappear. 38% wanted to uphold the current role of the Dutch monarchy.

A 2007 Motivaction research commissioned by HP/De Tijd found that 60.2% preferred the current constitutional monarchy, 13.7% wanted a purely ceremonial monarch without political tasks, 16.2% favoured a republic. Higher educated respondents—those with at least an hbo diploma—were more likely to favour change: 21.2% wanted a republic, 22.7% a purely ceremonial monarchy. A Motivaction survey amongst 1254 people between 15 and 80 years old conducted in late March 2013, commissioned by Trouw, showed that 11% wanted a greater role for the royal house, 48% favoured the status quo, 21% wanted a purely ceremonial role, 14% wanted to abolish it, 6% didn't know or had no opinion. Women, country-dwellers and the elderly were more likely to support the monarchy; men, city-dwellers and youths were more likely to be republicans.

On 29 April 2013, EénVandaag reported that 70% out of 22,000 people polled favoured the monarchy. On 31 January 2014, EénVandaag reported that out of 21,000 people polled, 21% favoured a republic, whilst 71% favoured the monarchy.

== Political parties' standpoints ==
Most Dutch political parties think that the royal house is a "binding factor" in society. The majority of the parties, however, argues that the monarchy should be reformed to a more ceremonial kingship (as is the case in, for example, Sweden). This means the king or queen will have fewer or no political functions at all anymore, so they can more easily be 'above politics'. This would in fact bring a republican form of government closer, but only the Socialist Party (SP) and GreenLeft (GL) explicitly pose a republic with an elected head of state as their end goal. The Christian parties Christian Democratic Appeal (CDA), ChristianUnion (CU) and Reformed Political Party (SGP) and the liberal People's Party for Freedom and Democracy (VVD) take the position that the current royal office should be maintained in its entirety. They opposed the idea that the House of Representatives should appoint the informateur or formateur themselves instead of the queen or king, but they complied when this did occur for the first time during the cabinet formation of 2012.

Political parties' standpoints on the monarchy
Should the king/queen be...	VVD	PvdA (part of GL/PvdA)	PVV	SP	CDA	D66	CU	GL (part of GL/PvdA)	SGP	PvdD	50Plus
...part of the government?	Yes	No	No	No	Yes	No	Yes	No	Yes	No	No
...chair of the Council of State?	Yes	No	No	No	Yes	No	Yes	No	Yes	No	No
...initiator of the formation?	Yes	No	No	No	Yes	No	Yes	No	Yes	No	No
...entitled to their current subsidy?	Yes	No	No	No	Yes	No	Yes	No	Yes	No	?
...legally protected against lèse-majesté?	Yes	No	No	No	Yes	No	Yes	No	Yes	No	?
...the head of state in the long term?	Yes	No	Yes	No	Yes	Yes	Yes	No	Yes	Yes	Yes

== See also ==
- 1919 Luxembourg referendum
- Dutch States Party
- Orangism (Belgium), supported the re-unification of Belgium and the Netherlands in a United Kingdom
- Orangism (Dutch Republic), a loosely defined current in support of a mixed constitution (until 1795)
- Orangism (Kingdom of the Netherlands), a liberal-monarchist trend (starting 1860s)
- Orangism (Luxembourg), supported the personal union of the Netherlands and the grand-duchy of Luxembourg
- Republiek (political organisation)
