= From the life of King Gorilla =

1887 Dutch satirical pamphlet

Uit het leven van Koning Gorilla
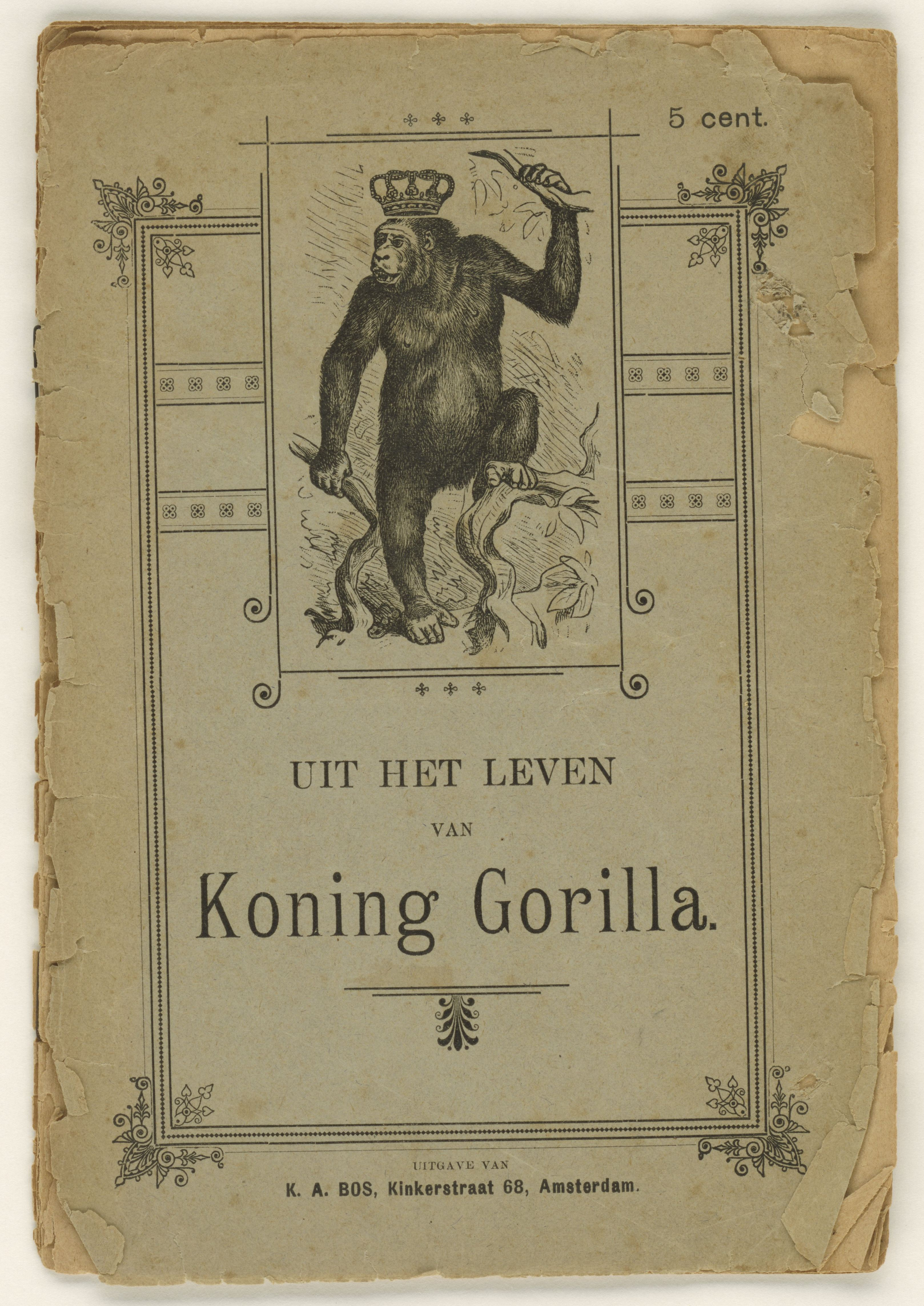
- Book cover of the 1897 edition
- Author: Sicco Roorda van Eysinga
- Original title: Uit het leven van Koning Gorilla
- Language: Dutch
- Genre: Satire
- Publisher: B. Liebers
- Publication date: 1887
- Publication place: Netherlands
- Pages: 24

From the life of King Gorilla (Uit het leven van Koning Gorilla, 1887) is a Dutch satirical pamphlet, published by B. Liebers in 1887. The pamphlet describes the many incidents of King William III, who is called 'King Gorilla' in the pamphlet. Later, 'King Gorilla' would become the nickname of King William III.

The pamphlet was written by the socialist magazine Justice for All. The reason for publishing it was the conviction of editor-in-chief Ferdinand Domela Nieuwenhuis in 1886, who was sentenced to a year in prison for lèse-majesté. In revenge for the conviction, the magazine published the pamphlet. It is striking that the theory that William III murdered his father is also mentioned in the pamphlet.

The pamphlet describes the incidents and events in which he comes across as someone who swears, has a drinking problem and abuses his lackeys and wife. The events in Montreux, where he was guilty of exhibitionism, are also mentioned in the pamphlet.

The pamphlet sold well. In the years that followed, the pamphlet would be reprinted. Many supporters of King William III found the pamphlet tasteless. But despite the criticism, the anonymous author(s) and the publisher were never prosecuted for printing and publishing the pamphlet.

== Background ==
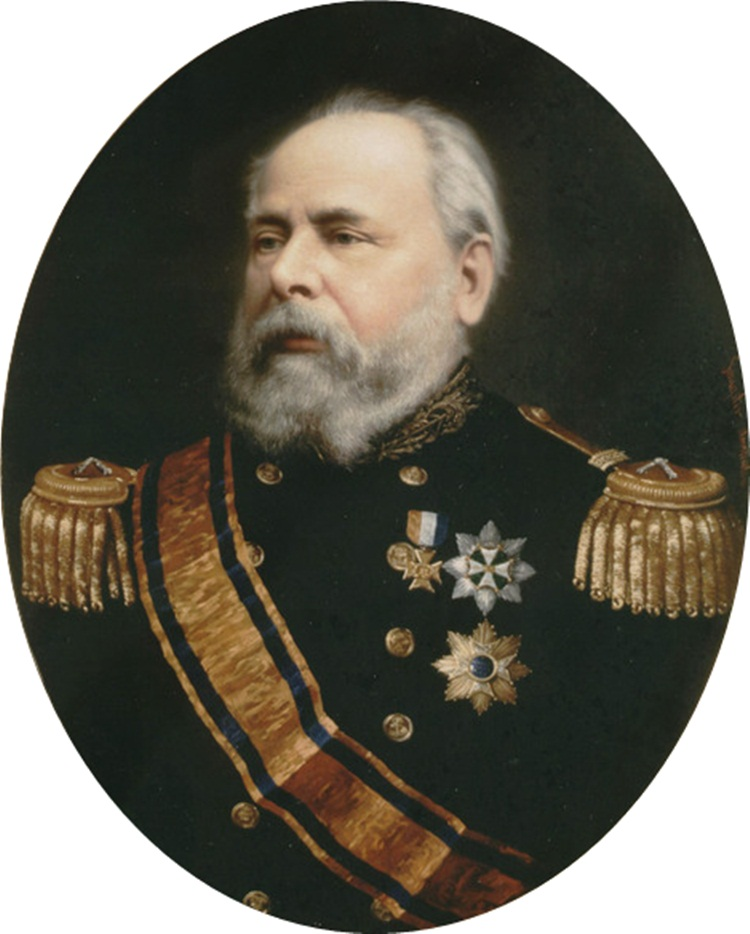
Portrait of King William III, circa 1878–1890.

Since 1849, William III was the king of the Netherlands. He was known as an unpredictable monarch who suffered from many fits of rage. In addition, William III could not stand the fact that the Netherlands was changing from an absolute monarchy to a constitutional one with parliamentary democracy, a process that was initiated by his father William II. William III's behaviour at court was also horrible. The king often bullied his lackeys and also drank a lot of alcohol. William III also abused his wife Sophie of Württemberg.

A major scandal took place in 1875. William III rented a villa in Montreux, Switzerland. There he was said to have been guilty of exhibitionism, by opening his dressing gown in front of the paddle steamers that sailed past his villa. This scandal would later be brought to light.

=== Extraordinary State Gazette ===
In 1885, posters of the Extraordinary State Gazette appeared in Dutch cities, in which it was supposedly stated that ‘William the Last’ would abdicate as king of the Netherlands. Furthermore, the pamphlet stated that the king would announce major reforms, such as the disbanding of the army, the abolition of the Dutch States General, and the organisation of a referendum. A new form of government would be selected by the Dutch in the referendum.

The pamphlet later turned out to be a satirical action, which was published by the socialist magazine Justice for All. The editor-in-chief of the magazine was the socialist Ferdinand Domela Nieuwenhuis. The action received a lot of support from the anarchist corner, but disgust from the royalist corner.

In 1886, Domela Nieuwenhuis was summoned to court because of an article that appeared in the magazine Justice for All. The article stated that King William III was ‘someone who made so little effort of his job’. Domela Nieuwenhuis was convicted of lèse-majesté. He was sentenced to one year in prison.

Socialist circles reacted with indignation to Domela Nieuwenhuis' prison sentence. They believed that the sentence was excessive. Especially because an anonymous writer, under the name P.v.d.V., was fined 25 guilders for a poem in which he wrote that King William III was 'a mean scoundrel and a big bastard'.

=== Fine Rusk ===
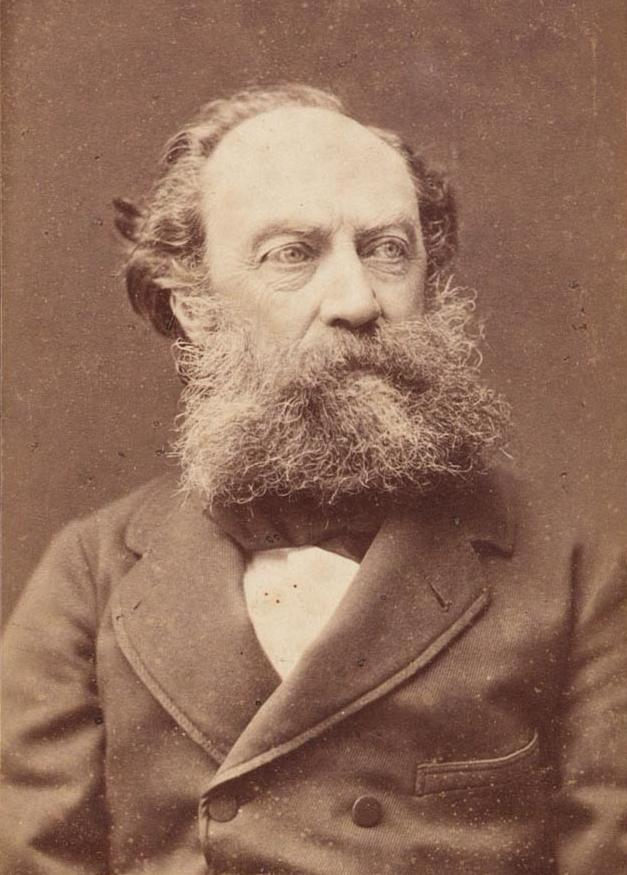
Portrait of Sicco Roorda van Eysinga.

The magazine Justice for All responded to Domela Nieuwenhuis' prison sentence by publishing several articles in the autumn of 1886 under the name Fine Rusk. Fine Rusk consisted of four episodes and was written by Sicco Roorda van Eysinga. Roorda van Eysinga had lived in Geneva since 1872 and heard stories about the misconduct of King William III there. The first episode appeared on 20 October 1886 and the last episode was published on 17 November 1886.

On 23 October 1886, Justice for All published an article that was a response to episode II of Fine Rusk. The anonymous writer added something to the story, with rumours about the misdeeds of William III in the army and the court. The king is said to have cursed violently at his generals and to have ordered the army to shoot all the generals dead. The story of how William III abused his lackeys and wife was also included in the article.

In January 1887, the editors of Justice for All allegedly came up with a plan to distribute a pamphlet on King William III's 70th birthday in revenge for the conviction of Domela Nieuwenhuis in 1886. On 22 January 1887, Justice for All published an appeal, officially announcing the pamphlet and motivating readers to buy the pamphlet to enable its distribution. The campaign was a success. A total of, ƒ74.85 guilders was spent, with which 2,493 copies of 3 cents were purchased and distributed.

== Contents ==
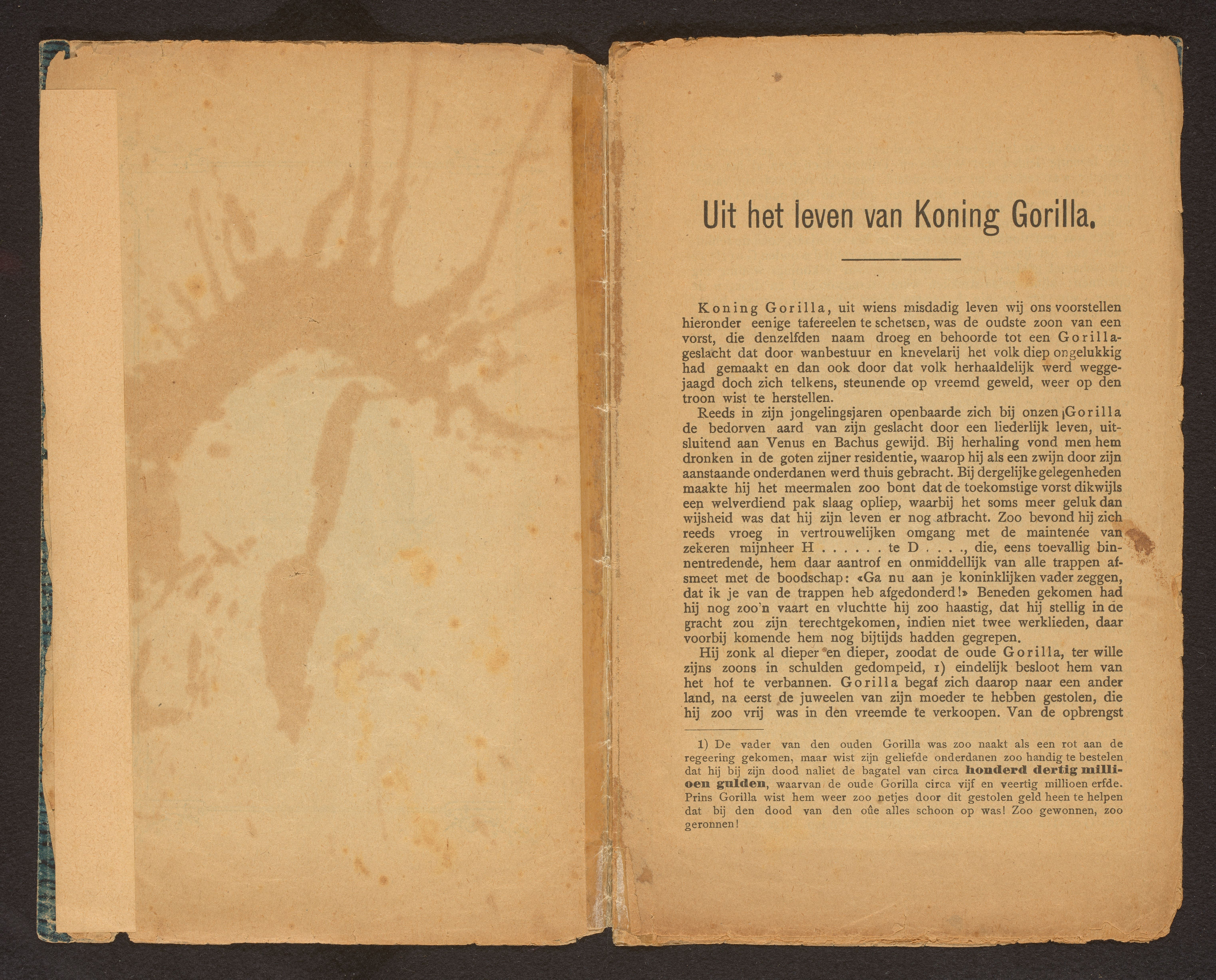
First page of From the life of King Gorilla.

From the life of King Gorilla describes the life of ‘King Gorilla’. Although he is not named, the pamphlet is certainly about King William III. On every page, the character of ‘King Gorilla’ was described, such as swearing, drunkenness and his fits of rage. Earlier stories about the events in Switzerland and the incidents in the army were also mentioned. The financial problems that ‘King Gorilla' had and the sale of valuables to other countries are also mentioned in the pamphlet.

=== Murder of William II ===
The pamphlet suggested that ‘King Gorilla' had murdered his father. On the first pages, a ‘poor person' with ‘a bludgeon' is stopped by the sentry of the country house of ‘the old Gorilla'. The commotion attracts the attention of the commander of the guard on duty. Then the man is recognized: ‘It is Prince Gorilla!', and he then proceeds, ‘with a sarcastic smile on his face past the startled guards', to the palace, according to the pamphlet.

Three hours later, at ten o'clock in the evening, the brigadier walked through the garden and saw a light on in the king's study. Closer by, a ‘violent exchange of words' appeared to be taking place. It turned out that ‘the king and his son had a quarrel’. Then Prince Gorilla closed the blinds. According to a servant, the prince had left the palace at eleven o’clock. The next day, the king appeared to have died.

No official proof has ever been found that William III actually murdered his father. According to the official statement, William II died on 17 March 1849 after a nasty fall on a shipyard in Rotterdam in an armchair in his country house in Tilburg. Prince William officially resided in England, did not feel like succeeding his father, but was persuaded anyway. In 2022, journalist Frans Peeters suggested in his book Koningsmoord op het Loo that William III actually murdered his father. According to Peeters, William III needed money from his father, but he did not get it. William would then have met his father at Het Loo Palace to ask him for money again. After his father refused again, William III killed his father in a fit of rage.

== Aftermath ==
Despite the fact that no official sales figures are known, the pamphlet sold very well. It would later be reprinted several times. Many supporters of the royal family found the pamphlet tasteless and unbearable. According to some sources, royalists allegedly smashed the windows of ‘socialist’ bookshops. This has never been officially proven.

Many newspapers wrote that Sicco Roorda van Eysinga was the presumed author of the pamphlet. But there is still doubt whether this is true. According to critics, the writing style in the pamphlet was far too coarse and deviates from the writing style of Roorda van Eysinga. In addition, the publisher's name was visible on the cover, for protection against possible prosecution. However, this would not have been necessary in the case of Roorda van Eysinga, because he lived in Switzerland, which meant he could not be prosecuted.

The anonymous author(s) and the responsible publisher B. Liebers were never charged for printing and distributing the pamphlet. According to historians, the government was aware of the incidents of King William III and were afraid that if they started an investigation into events that were based on truth, it would cause unwanted publicity.

The pamphlet ultimately contributed to the declining popularity of the monarchy in the Netherlands. The call to abolish the monarchy became increasingly louder after its publication. An incident occurred in September 1887, when the socialist Alexander Cohen saw King William III riding in a carriage. Cohen then shouted slogans such as 'Away with the Gorilla' and 'Long live socialism'. He was sentenced to six months in prison for lèse-majesté.
