= De Roode Duivel =

Dutch weekly magazine

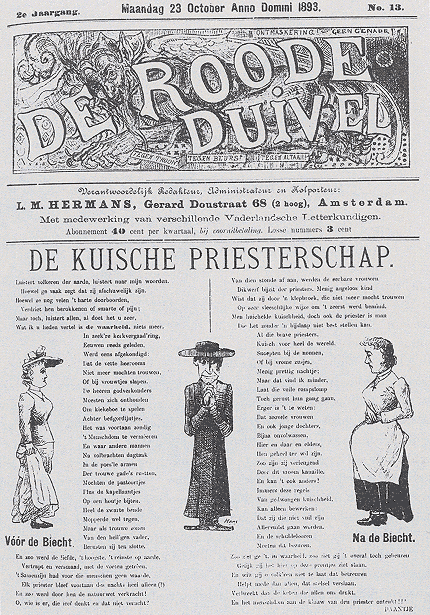
- "Ontmaskering! Geen genade" (Exposure! No mercy) "Tegen troon, tegen beurs, tegen altaar" (Against throne, against bourse, against altar)
- Editor-in-chief: Louis Maximiliaan Hermans
- Categories: satire, socialism, antireligion, republicanism
- Frequency: weekly
- Circulation: several thousands
- Publisher: Excelsior (since March 1893)
- First issue: 1 August 1892
- Final issue: 13 December 1897
- Country: Netherlands
- Based in: Amsterdam
- Language: Dutch

De Roode Duivel (English: The Red Devil) was a Dutch socialist, antireligious, republican, humorist satirical weekly magazine. The weekly was edited by Louis Maximiliaan Hermans (who would later become a Member of Parliament and Senator), and was published from 1 August 1892 until 13 December 1897. De Roode Duivel had a circulation of several thousands of copies. Hermans, who was initially a member of the revolutionary Social Democratic League, also used the magazine to criticise the parliamentarist Social Democratic Workers' Party (SDAP).

Under the mottos of "Tegen troon, tegen beurs, tegen altaar" (Against throne, against bourse, against altar) and "Ontmaskering! Geen genade" (Exposure! No mercy), the magazine was filled with gossip and libellous stories to discredit the monarchy, capitalism and religion with satire. For example, Hermans invented the fabrication that not king William III, but adjutant S.M.S. de Ranitz was the real father of the then underage queen Wilhelmina. It was clear to contemporary readers that this was willfully made-up satire, and historians agree the story is false. However, it has since taken a life on its own as a conspiracy theory, invoked by some republicans to question the current House of Orange-Nassau's legitimacy to rule.

In the 30 August 1895 issue of De Roode Duivel, on the occasion of a royal visit to the town of Meppel, the queens Emma and Wilhelmina were depicted as gymnastic moves performing ballet dancers on a wagon. Although they were not named, both figures were wearing a little crown with the letters W and E. The accompanying article featured the title: "Come and see!! Come and see!!" This led to a complaint against Hermans for lèse-majesté, and a demand by the public prosecutor for a one-year prison sentence; on 18 December 1895, the editor-in-chief was convicted to six months imprisonment. When he got out of prison, his return was celebrated at the Paleis voor Volksvlijt.

Meanwhile, Hermans' views on tactics had been shifting. Whilst radicals such as Domela Nieuwenhuis became anarchists, Hermans followed the others of the Socialist League (more and more of whom were defecting to the SDAP) in gradually abandoning their antiparliamentarism. After investigating the living conditions in the Jewish neighbourhood of Amsterdam in 1897, Hermans stated he was prepared to run for office in local elections to change society by that means. On 13 December 1897, the final issue of De Roode Duivel was published. In early 1898, Hermans was acting as editor-in-chief (together with J.A. Bergmeijer) of Recht voor Allen (the Socialist League's party magazine) after Domela Nieuwenhuis' departure, but in December 1898 he also left the Socialist League to join the SDAP, that he had fought against so long in De Roode Duivel.
