= Aaen =

Aaen is a Danish surname. The double a is equivalent to the Danish å. The pronunciation is very similar to the Welsh surname Owen. Notable people with the surname include:

- Craig Aaen-Stockdale, British-Norwegian researcher and political activist
- Frank Aaen (born 1951), Danish politician
- Gitte Aaen (born 1981), Danish handballer
- Jonas Aaen Jørgensen (born 1986), Danish cyclist
