= De Republikein =

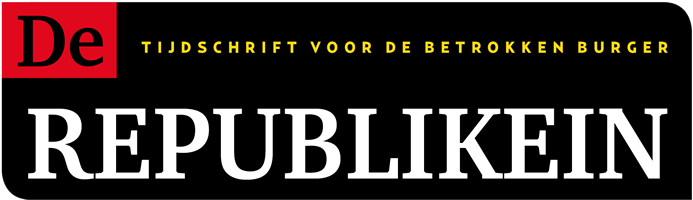
- "Magazine for the Involved Citizen"
- Editor-in-chief: Tom Rooduijn (2005–2008); Rik Smits (2008–2015); René Zwaap (2015–present)
- Categories: Dutch republicanism
- Frequency: Quarterly
- Circulation: 1,300 (2005)
- Publisher: Stichting De Republikein / Virtùmedia Zeist
- First issue: 2005
- Country: Netherlands
- Language: Dutch
- Website: www.derepublikein.nl
- ISSN: 0921-5085

De Republikein. Tijdschrift voor de betrokken burger ("The Republican. Magazine for the Involved Citizen") is a Dutch republican magazine, published since 2005.

== History ==
In 2005, the magazine was created on the joint initiative of the New Republican Society and the Republican Society, aiming to stimulate discussion on both hereditary kingship as well as true democracy. Since 2005, the magazine appears four times a year. It is published by the Stichting De Republikein, in collaboration with publishing house Virtùmedia Zeist. Not only members of the societies are involved in producing the magazine; journalists and historians, too, regularly provide contributions or write guest columns. Between 2008 and 2015, science journalist Rik Smits is editor-in-chief of De Republikein. Since late 2015, the current editor-in-chief is René Zwaap.

== Editorial staff ==
- René Zwaap (editor-in-chief)
- Karin Mollema (managing editor)
- Thom de Lagh
- Gijs Korevaar
- Maurits van den Toorn

== Reception ==
Columnist and subscriber Elma Drayer called De Republikein "a lovely magazine", but had to conclude that, because of their sympathy for mysticism, most Dutch people are unlikely to convert to the "rational, reasonable republicanism" the magazine is trying to spread, even when "it does demonstrate as hard as nails that hereditary kingship is an anachronistic, money-wasting, anti-democratic puppet-show".
