= Anton van Hooff =

20th and 21st-century Dutch historian and author

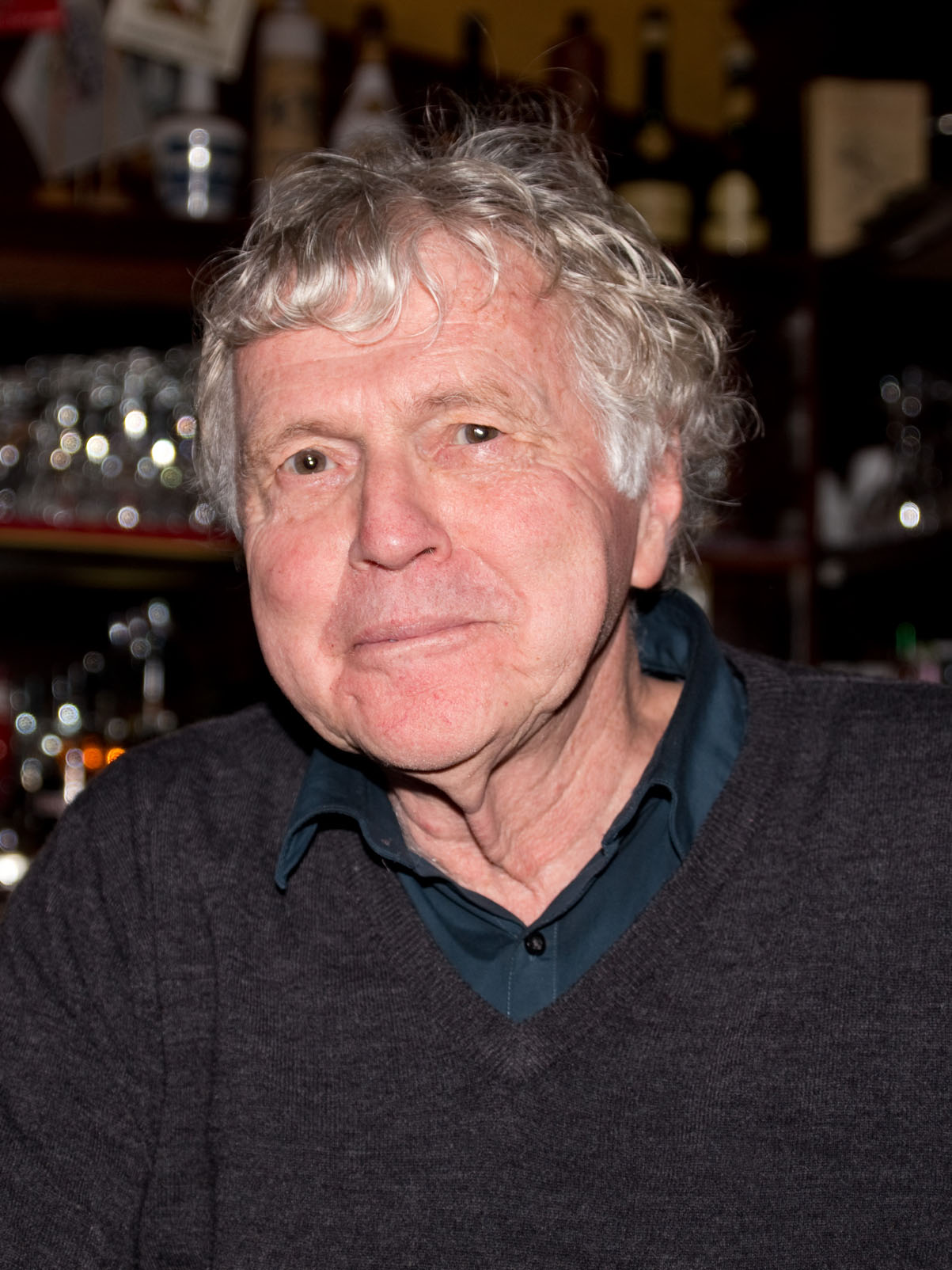
- Van Hooff at Utrecht Freethinkers in the Pub, March 2015.
- Born: Antonius Jacobus Leonardus van Hooff; 6 October 1943; The Hague

Academic background
- Education: Radboud University Nijmegen
- Thesis: Pax romana: een studie van het Romeinse imperialisme (1971)

Academic work
- Institutions: Radboud University Nijmegen
- Main interests: Classical antiquity Anton van Hooff's voice Recorded June 2015

Antonius Jacobus Leonardus (Anton) van Hooff (born 1943) is a Dutch historian of antiquity, author and a former docent. From 2009 until 2015, he chaired the freethinkers association De Vrije Gedachte.

In 1971, Van Hooff graduated with the dissertation Pax romana: een studie van het Romeinse imperialisme ("Pax Romana: a Study of Roman Imperialism"). Until 2008, Van Hooff was docent in ancient history at the Radboud University Nijmegen. He specialises in classical antiquity, and regularly publishes in various newspapers and magazines. He wrote several books, including Nero & Seneca, Athene ("Athens") and Marcus Aurelius.

Van Hooff is an atheist, a republican and a member of the Republican Society. On 3 December 2014, Van Hooff held the first ever Hans van den Bergh Lecture of the New Republican Society in De Balie.

== Books ==
- Zelfdoding in de antieke wereld (1990)/From Autothanasia to Suicide. Self-killing in Classical Antiquity (1990)
- De vonk van Spartacus: het voortleven van een antieke rebel (1993)
- Nero & Seneca. De despoot en de denker (2010)
- Athene. Het leven van de eerste democratie (2011)
- Marcus Aurelius. De keizer-filosoof (2012)
- Klassiek. Geschiedenis van de Grieks-Romeinse wereld (2013)
- Keizers van het Colosseum. Vespasianus, Titus en Domitianus (2014)
- Sterven in stijl. Leven met de dood in de klassieke oudheid (2015)
- From Autothanasia to Suicide: Self-killing in Classical Antiquity. Routledge. 2002. ISBN 9781134953790. OCLC 812945773.
