= Genootschap =

A genootschap (German - genossenschaft) is a specifically Dutch form of company, association, society or cooperative, named after the pursuit for which its members gather. Many of the genootschappen were created in the second half of the 18th century. They allowed like-minded people to meet, socialize, listen to presentations and discuss each other's work. Genootschappen were established in the various sciences, in Dutch language and literature, and in other fields.

== Definition ==
Each member voluntarily joins his or her fate with that of his or her fellow members and that of the genootschap's ups and downs. Such a society also usually has a number of other characteristics:

- Size and composition: The number of members of a society is limited. A society can be sizeable, but it is never a mass association. Thus its intentions are decided only by its character.
- Objective: The target of a genootschap is always carried forward by its members with a certain degree of seriousness, as well as a great social aim. From this also results its solemn character and interest in decorum.

== Kinds ==
- Discreet genootschap
- Geheim genootschap
- Initiatiegenootschap
- Kerkgenootschap
- Wetenschappelijk genootschap
- Moresgenootschap

== Examples ==
- Actuarieel Genootschap
- Bataafs Genootschap voor Proefondervindelijke wijsbegeerte
- Genootschap der Vrienden
- Genootschap Kunstliefde
- Genootschap Onze Taal
- Genootschap van de Heilige Kindsheid
- Het Apostolisch Genootschap
- Kerlinga
- Koninklijk Bataviaasch Genootschap van Kunsten en Wetenschappen
- Koninklijk Nederlands Aardrijkskundig Genootschap
- Koninklijk Nederlands Geologisch Mijnbouwkundig Genootschap
- Koninklijk Wiskundig Genootschap
- Koninklijk Zeeuws Genootschap der Wetenschappen
- Louis Couperus Genootschap
- Met Tijd en Vlijt
- Natuurhistorisch Genootschap Limburg
- Natuurkundig Genootschap der Dames
- Nederlands Genootschap van Hoofdredacteuren
- Nederlands Genootschap voor Heraldiek
- Nederlands Huisartsen Genootschap
- Nederlandsch Onderwijzers Genootschap
- Nederlandsch Zendeling Genootschap
- Nieuw Republikeins Genootschap
- Olivaint Genootschap van België
- Religieus Genootschap der Vrienden
- Republikeins Genootschap
- Rotary International
- Rozenkruisers
- Russisch Geografisch Genootschap
- Ruusbroecgenootschap
- Teylers Eerste Genootschap
- Teylers Tweede Genootschap
- Theosofisch Genootschap
- Theosofisch Genootschap Point Loma-Covina
- Thule Gesellschaft
- Theosofisch Genootschap Pasadena
- Vrijmetselarij
