= Cornelis Krayenhoff =

Dutch physicist, artist and general

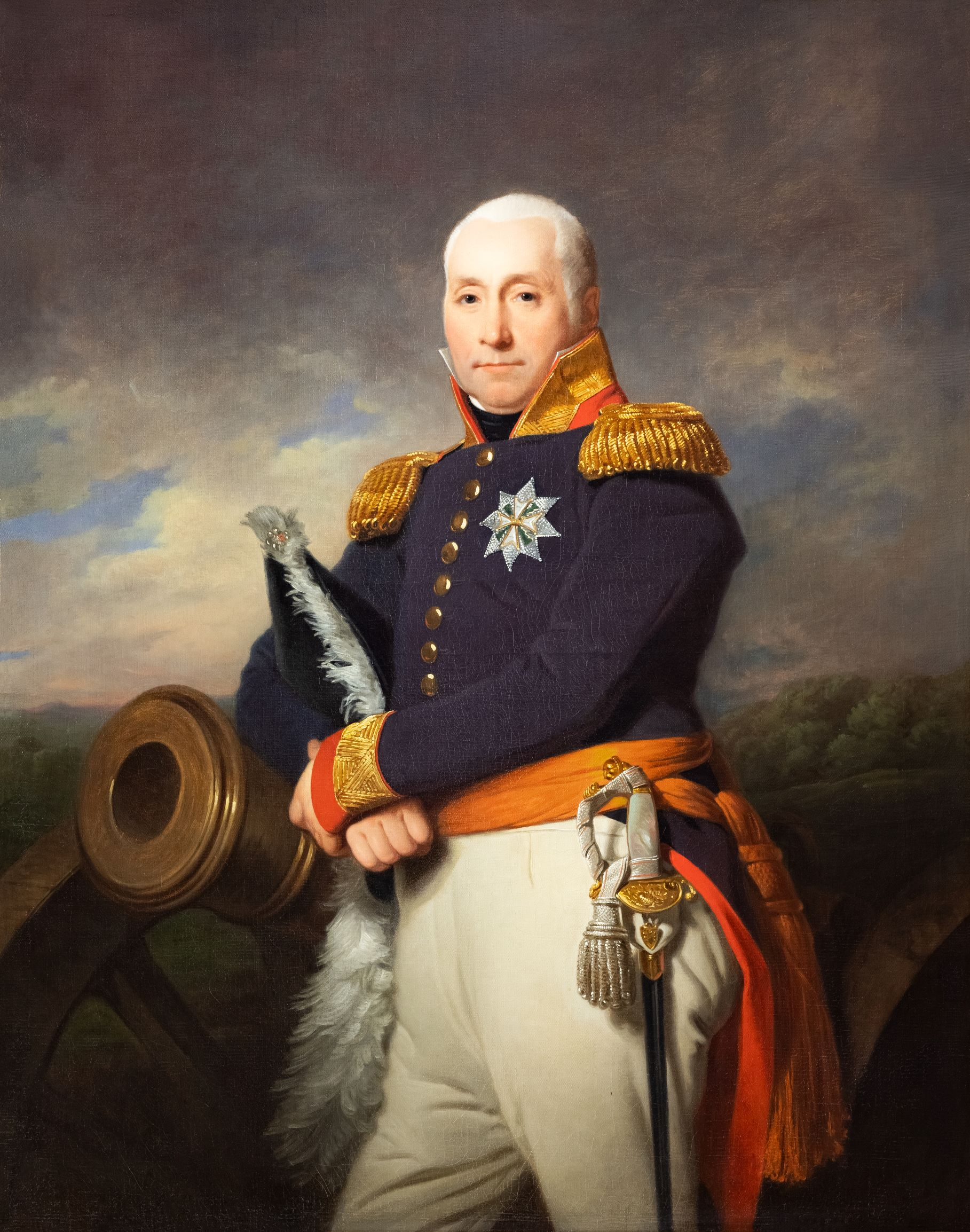
Portrait by Charles Howard Hodges, 1823

Corneli(u)s Rudolphus Theodorus, Baron Krayenhoff (Nijmegen, 2 June 1758 – Nijmegen, 24 November 1840) was a physicist, artist, general, hydraulic engineer, cartographer and – against his will and for only a short time – Dutch Minister of War.

== Biography ==
His father was a hydraulic engineer and soldier in Nijmegen, with brewing as a sideline. Krayenhoff was educated in Nijmegen, Arnhem and Harderwijk. In the latter city he met Herman Willem Daendels, later a fellow-revolutionary. He had been intended to study law, but began to study philosophy and medicine instead (1777–1783). He wrote his dissertations on the theory of the imagination and a medical survey of the dysentery epidemic that raged in Nijmegen in 1783. He established himself as a physician in Amsterdam, after he had declined an offer of a professorate in medicine at Franeker university. He was a member of the Concordia et Libertate genootschap and of Maatschappij tot Nut van 't Algemeen. In the Felix Meritis genootschap he presented physics experiments and lectured on art history, while taking lessons in painting. He refused a request to take charge of organizing military inundations around Amsterdam during the Patriot Revolt of 1785–7. This may have contributed to the fall of Amsterdam to the Prussians in 1787, when they intervened in favor of stadtholder William V.

Krayenhoff was an authority on electricity and lightning. The spire of the Grote or Martinikerk (a church in Doesburg) was, in 1782, the first building in the Netherlands to be equipped with a lightning conductor. He and Adriaan Paets van Troostwijk in 1787 won first prize for their article on electricity. In 1791 he became a member of the Hollandsche Maatschappij der Wetenschappen, and in 1808 member of the Royal Institute (a scientific genootschap, one of the predecessors of the Royal Netherlands Academy of Arts and Sciences).

=== The Batavian Republic ===
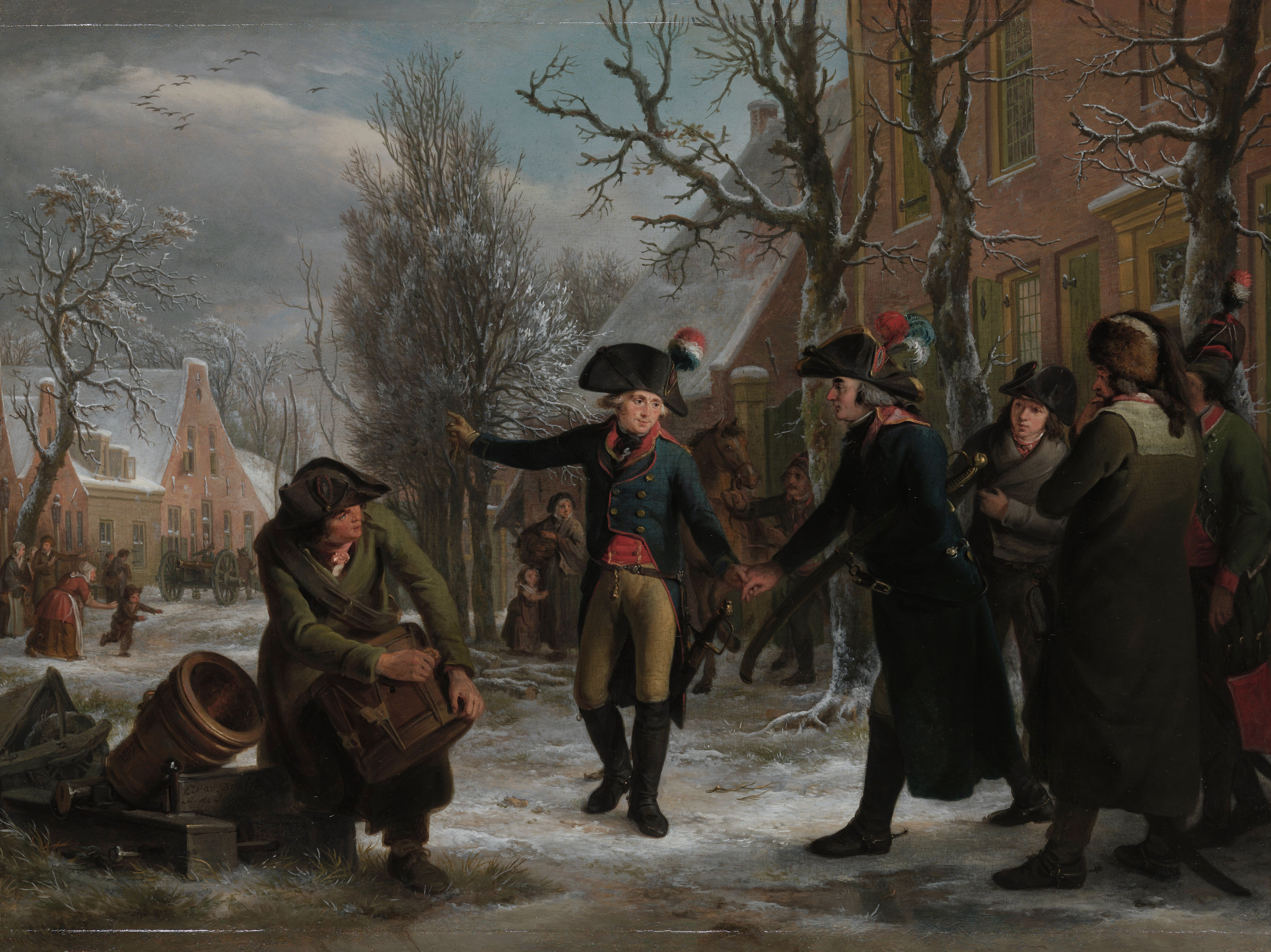
Egbert van Drielst and Adriaan de Lelie: Krayenhoff in French uniform on his departure from Maarssen on Sunday morning, 18 January 1795

At the end of 1794 Krayenhoff became involved in revolutionary activities of the Patriots in Amsterdam, while the French revolutionary armies under general Charles Pichegru and general Daendels were invading the Dutch Republic. In October 1794, the revolutionaries attempted an insurrection in Amsterdam, in which Krayenhoff, together with Alexander Gogel was a ringleader (he acted as Military Officer of the Revolutionary Committee). After its suppression he had to flee Amsterdam secretly because he was gathering weapons in Amsterdam. He joined the Patriot Revolutionary Committee with the French headquarters in 's-Hertogenbosch.

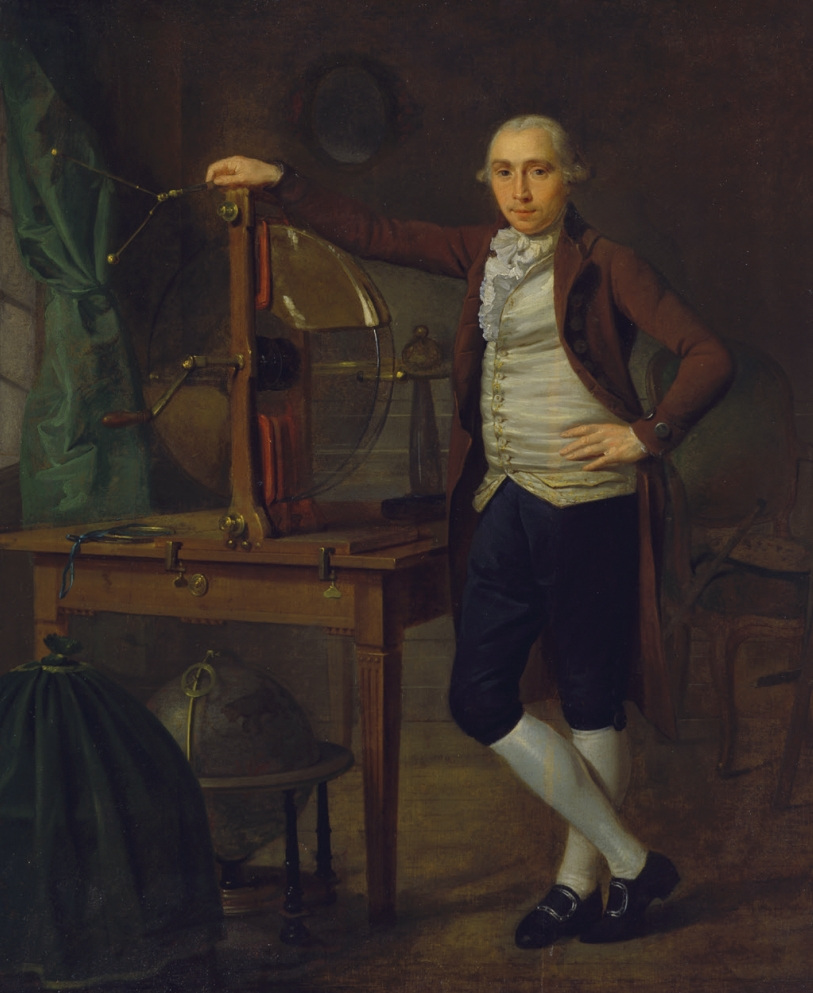
A 1792 painting in the National Portrait Gallery showing Krayenhoff standing beside an electrostatic generator

The French advanced rapidly after the Waal river froze over in late December 1794. Soon important cities, like Nijmegen and Utrecht capitulated. The Patriot Revolutionary Committee (with Samuel Iperusz. Wiselius and Nicolaas van Staphorst) deemed it important to liberate an important city itself, without direct French aid, to support its claims to independent authority in the Netherlands. It therefore sent Krayenhoff to Amsterdam, in a French lieutenant's uniform, to organize another insurrection. On Sunday afternoon 18 January 1795 – at Daendels' instruction – he came to tell Amsterdam's burgomasters that they had better resign the next day. Intimidated by large crowds of Patriot sympathizers (who threatened President-Burgomaster Straalman's personal safety) and demoralized by the fact that the commander of the Amsterdam garrison, Col. Golowkin, refused to intervene, the city government handed over command of the garrison to Krayenhoff at midnight. The next morning, the Amsterdam Revolutionary Committee triumphantly rode to city hall, while exultant crowds planted a liberty tree on Dam Square.

In 1796 he became head of Dutch fortifications and moved to Muiden Castle. From 1798 he was involved in organising the new Rijkswaterstaat, after the establishment of the unitary state. He was involved in the campaign against the Anglo-Russian invasion of Holland of 1799 as commander of the Batavian Engineers (see Battle of Castricum) and advised the army leadership. After the Convention of Alkmaar of 18 October 1799, in which the evacuation of the invasion troops was agreed, Krayenhoff, on behalf of the Batavian command inspected the fortifications which the British had promised to leave intact as part of the convention.

Krayenhoff was meanwhile beginning his life's work : setting up a system of triangulation, so that the Netherlands could be mapped in detail.

Krayenhoff busied himself with determining the Amsterdam Level. King Louis Bonaparte (the ruler of the Kingdom of Holland after 1806) was very taken with him and gave him various positions. Krayenhoff was for ten months Minister of War and organized Amsterdam's defensive fortifications against a feared invasion by the king's brother Napoleon Bonaparte. Krayenhoff in this context initiated the construction of the Stelling van Amsterdam, at this time called the Posten van Krayenhoff, or the Oude Stelling van Amsterdam. When Napoleon became aware of this, Krayenhoff had to be fired. However, in a personal encounter in October 1811, Napoleon showed interest in him. Together they went to see the fortifications in Naarden and Muiden. The emperor gave him an appointment in Paris to check the defense of the city. Krayenhoff got an attractive offer from Russia, but feared the tsar, for his two sons had been captured during the French invasion of Russia in 1812 and were still in captivity.

However, Krayenhoff became increasingly disaffected with the French. As an illustration, Willem de Clercq mentions in his diary that Krayenhoff, during the Dutch insurrection against France in 1813, gave the order that, should there be a French attack, "...everybody should take up the cobblestones before his front door, carry them to his parlour, and greet the attacking French lovingly with a hail of stones" (Dutch: aan iedereen om de stenen voor zijn deur op te nemen, dezelve op zijn voorkamer te transporteren en daarmee de aanvallende Fransen lieflijk met een steenregen te begroeten). In 1813 he worked diligently for the Restoration and was consulted by Alexander von Benckendorff. In 1815 his eldest son fought in the Battle of Waterloo against Napoleon, and was wounded. He himself was made a baron by William I of the Netherlands, the new king.

In that same year, he took the initiative for the construction of the New Dutch Water Line, assisted by Jan Blanken. In 1818, Krayenhoff got into problems regarding the building of defence works in Charleroi. His youngest son, Johan Krayenhoff, was involved in the building of fort Batavia in Nijmegen. In 1826 king William I of the Netherlands honored Krayenhoff by renaming it after him. In 1825 he travelled on a frigate to Surinam and Curaçao.

Krayenhoff got into more problems in 1826 over alleged malversations committed during the construction work of fortifications in Ypres and Ostend, but was acquitted at a trial in 1830.

On 12 May 1823, Krayenhoff was appointed Knight Grand Cross in the Order of William for his contribution to the strengthening of the Netherlands' southern border. From 1826 on he left active service and wrote his memoirs.

Krayenhoff died at the age of 82 and was initially buried in the fortress at Nijmegen that was named after him (his headstone is still there). In 1916 he was reburied at Rustoord cemetery in Nijmegen.

== Works ==
- Paets van Troostwijk, A. & C.R.T. Krayenhoff (1787) De l'application de l'electricité à la physique et à la médecine.
- Verz. van hydrogr. en topogr. waarnemingen in Holland (1813)
- Précis historique des opérations géodésiques et astronomiques faites en Hollande (1815)
- Proeve van een ontwerp tot scheiding der rivieren de Waal en de Boven-Maas (1823)
- Geschiedk. beschouwing van den oorlog op het grondgebied der Bat. Republiek in 1799 (1825)
- De Lt.-gen. Bn. Krayenhoff voor het Hoog Mil. Geregtshof beschreven en vrijgesproken (1830)
- Bijdr. tot de Vaderl. gesch. van 1808 en 1809 (1838)

== Sources ==
- This article is based entirely or partially on its equivalent on Dutch Wikipedia.
- (in Dutch) Akihary, H. & M. Behagel (1982) De verdedigingsbouw in Nederland tussen 1795 en 1914. In: Vesting. Vier eeuwen vestingbouw in Nederland, onder redactie van J. Sneep, H.A. Treu en M. Tydeman.
- (in Dutch) Clerq, W. de (1813) Woelige weken, November – December 1813, p. 94-5.
- (in Dutch) Krayenhoff, C.R.T. (1832) Geschiedkundige Beschouwing van den Oorlog op het grondgebied der Bataafsche Republiek in 1799. J.C. Vieweg
- (in Dutch) Levensbijzonderheden van de luitenant-generaal C.R.T. Krayenhoff door hem zelven in schrift gesteld, en op zijn verlangen in het licht gegeven door Mr H.W. Tijdeman (1844).
- Schama, S. (1977), Patriots and Liberators. Revolution in the Netherlands 1780–1813. New York, Vintage books, ISBN 0-679-72949-6
- (in Dutch) Turksma, L. (2005) Wisselend lot in een woelige tijd. Van Hogendorp, Krayenhoff, Chassé en Janssens, generaals in Bataafs-Franse dienst.

Dutch nobility
New title	Baron Krayenhoff; 1815–1840	Succeeded by Cornelis Johannes Krayenhoff
