= Craig Aaen-Stockdale =

British-Norwegian researcher

Craig Aaen-Stockdale is a British-Norwegian researcher, political activist, and republican. He has led the Norwegian Republican Association, whose goal is to abolish the monarchy in Norway, since 2023. He is also a board member of the Alliance of European Republican Movements, an umbrella organisation for republican movements in Europe.

In 2024, he reported Princess Märtha Louise and her then-fiancée, now husband, Durek Verrett to Oslo police for a suspected breach of the very strict Norwegian laws on alcohol advertising. The same year, he reported the Royal Palace, Oslo to the Public Procurements Complaints Board (Klagenemnda for offentlige anskaffelser) for a suspected breach of the regulations on public procurement regarding the purchase, without a tender process, of a sarcophagus for King Harald and Queen Sonja. The complaint was eventually rejected in February 2025 but the Palace was forced to clarify irregularities regarding the cost of the contract.

He has a doctorate in psychology from University of Nottingham.
