= Republican Society =

The Republican Society (Dutch: Republikeins Genootschap) is a Dutch republican movement, founded on 11 September 1996 in the Prinsenhof in Delft, at the initiative of Pierre Vinken. Its aim is to abolish the monarchy of the Netherlands.

== Founders and goal ==
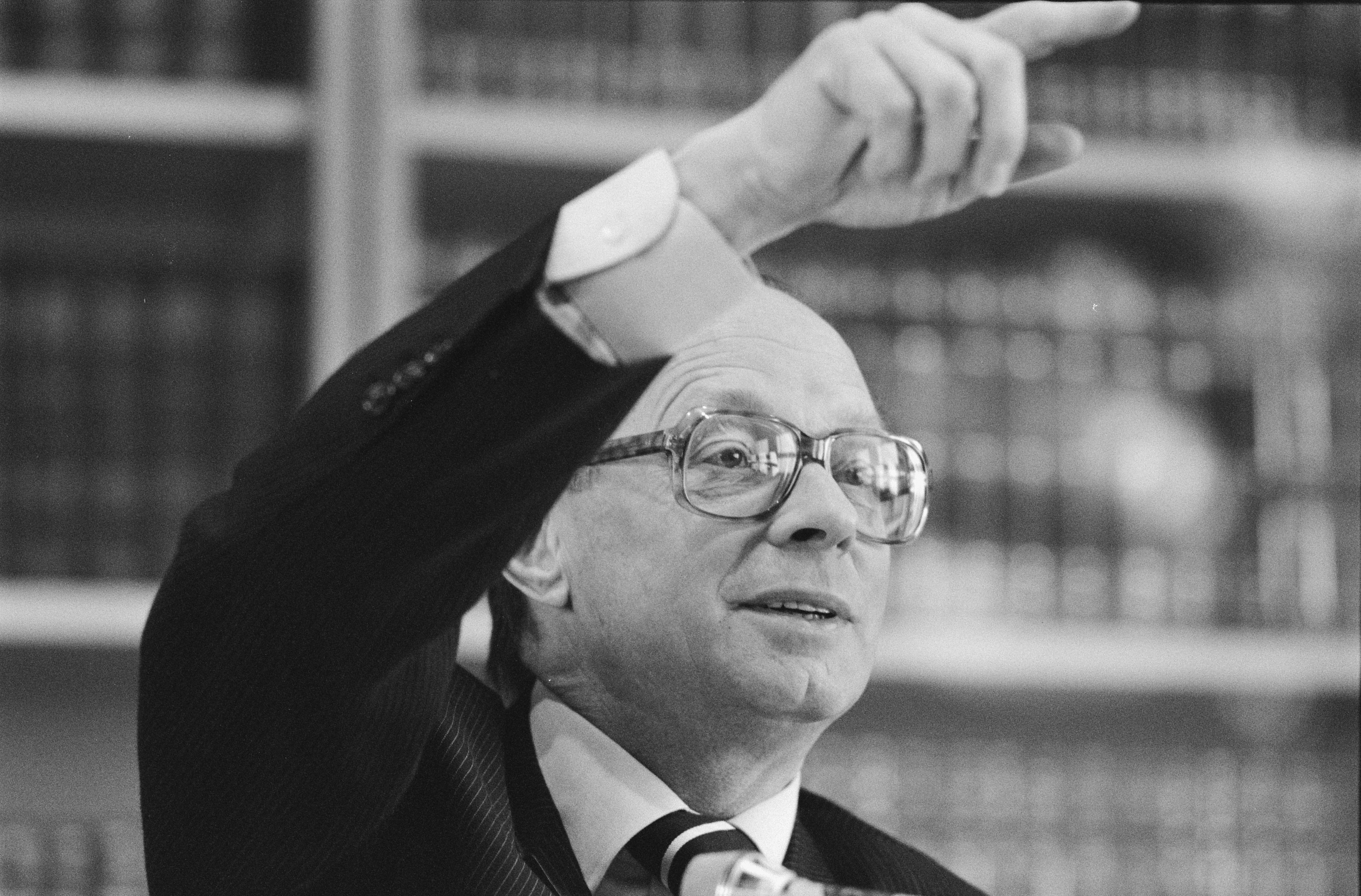
Initiator Pierre Vinken

According to the Republican Society's website, there are fourteen founders:

- Martin van Amerongen (1941–2002)
- Arend Jan Dunning (1930–2009)
- Han Kleiterp (1933–2014)
- Ben Knapen (1951)
- Lense Koopmans (1943–2015)
- Piet Korteweg
- Sjeng Kremers (1933)
- Roelof Nelissen (1931–2019)
- Henny de Ruiter (1934)
- Albert Schuitemaker (1928–2008)
- Pierre Vinken (1927–2011)
- Frits Visser
- Loek van Vollenhoven (1930)
- Guus Zoutendijk (1929–2005)

The idea was to start with fifteen members, and two absent people –Harry Mulisch and Schuitemaker– would be marked as co-founders in absentia. However, Mulisch withdrew and thus brought the number to fourteen. These were all prominent members of Dutch society with influential positions in politics, science, business, education and journalism.

The society does not have any bylaws. Unlike the New Republican Society, the Republican Society does not undertake actions to bring the republic closer. It proceeds from the notion that the mere existence of the Republican Society will be enough to enable the restoration of the Dutch Republic in the long term. One can only become a member by co-optation.

== History ==
=== Origins, leak and controversy ===
The group originated from Vinken's circle of friends "to discuss the last taboo in the Netherlands". The Republican Society's existence was kept a secret at first; a period of two hidden years was planned, and then to await a blunder on part of the monarchy. This decision was taken, because some members could get in trouble with their professional connections, and because opinion polls showed that 95% of the population favoured the monarchy. Initially, there was some confusion about how serious the fellowship actually was (amongst other things, the proposal "to proclaim the blue-gray napkin of the Prinsenkelder the official Flag of the Republic" suggested the gathering was at least partially in jest). After the first gathering was over, the founders sent letters to others, to confidentially inform them about the Society, with the question if they were interested in joining. In October 1996, Piet Grijs (Hugo Brandt Corstius) already betrayed the cause by writing in Vrij Nederland that, despite his fervent republicanism, he would not partake in the secrecy; however, his (limited) exposé did not cause any uproar yet. Early 1997, one of the people involved leaked the minutes of the founding meeting to de Volkskrant, who revealed it to the public on 26 February 1997. The also leaked post-foundation correspondence, showed that several members had distanced themselves from the Society in the meantime; for example, Mulisch (absent during the foundation) criticised the exclusion of women and foreigners ("Decision 4: Members will also be selected based on physical characteristics: only native men are eligible."). Members approached by the media for comments, reacted annoyed on the leaking of, and/or their membership of, the Republican Society, refused to respond or desired to remain anonymous. In the media, especially De Telegraaf that ran the headline "Leave our royal house alone!", and also from politics, including prime minister Wim Kok, the reaction was generally overwhelmingly negative. However, the Young Democrats and Young Socialists enthusiastically sought to join the Society, and hold nationwide discussions on monarchy and republic; the Youth Organisation Freedom and Democracy stated they were in favour of a purely ceremonial kingship "according to the Swedish model".

=== Regrouping ===
Knapen, who had distanced himself from the Society soon after its foundation, accused De Telegraaf and de Volkskrant of taking the Society way too seriously, and called the media controversy a "farce". Van Amerongen, however, stood up defiantly in De Groene Amsterdammer, in which he indeed explained "Decision 4" to be a mere joke, but the republican initiative as a whole "extremely serious" and "serious in every sense", and provided more legitimacy for the cause. He primarily rebuked De Telegraaf, accusing it of hypocrisy by first calling the emergence of the Republican Society "barely noteworthy", before filling page after page about it for an entire week, and write down reviling remarks from several famous Dutch people addressed to the republicans (singer Gerard Joling called them "traitors"). Some like historian Anton van Hooff joined the ranks of the Society, other republicans such as Socialist Party leader Jan Marijnissen did not (no 'conspiratory clubs'), but did support having a public nationwide debate on the monarchy, which in their opinion unjustly appeared to be a taboo subject. Several politicians and commentators proceeded to sweeten the issue, which, despite the serious undertone, appeared to be a partially "derailed joke", because the prankish remarks in Vinken's minutes such as "Decision 4" were unintentionally taken seriously in print. Although the existence of the Republican Society was revealed prematurely and rather clumsily, it succeeded in having the form of government debated nationally. One year later, the media no longer wrote about the royal house without criticism, and the membership of the Republican Society grew rapidly.

=== Growth and competition ===
During its first anniversary in September 1997, the Republican Society itself sought publicity by showing a new, expanded list of members, which now included women and foreigners, such as Jeroen Brouwers, Remco Campert, Jaap van Heerden, André Haakmat, Jasperina de Jong, H.U. Jessurun d'Oliveira, Ite Rümke, André Spoor, Jan Timman, Adriaan Morrien, Theo Sontrop, Theo van Gogh and Theodor Holman. However, the Society's exclusivity by co-optation and the lack of public actions formed an obstacle to various politically active youths, who launched the New Republican Society (NRG) on 21 January 1998 in De Balie. On 28 January, the NRG jokingly proclaimed the Third Republic of the Netherlands on Dam Square, preceding queen Beatrix's 60th birthday celebrations. The two republican societies did soon decide to approach each other and possibly cooperate.

In 2005, the Republican Society and the New Republican Society co-founded the magazine De Republikein ("The Republican").
