= Swedish Republican Association =

Association that favours a republic rather than monarchy

The Swedish Republican Association
- Republikanska föreningen
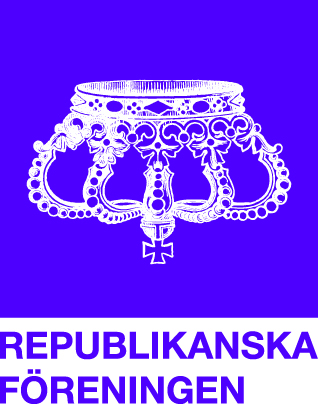
- Formation: 1997
- Purpose: Political advocacy
- Headquarters: Stockholm
- Region served: Sweden
- Members: 6 548
- Chairman: Niclas Malmberg
- Main organ: Board of directors
- Affiliations: Alliance of European Republican Movements
- Website: www.republikanskaforeningen.se

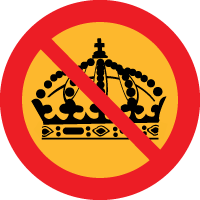
One of several logos

Swedish Republican Association (Swedish: Republikanska föreningen) is a politically and religiously independent association that advocates the abolition of the Swedish monarchy as a form of government and the establishment of a republican form of government as per the Finnish model. The Swedish Republican Association was founded in 1997. The current chairperson is Niclas Malmberg (2023).

== List of chairpersons ==
Period	President
1999–2001	Magnus Simonsson
2001–2002	Joel Malmqvist
2002–2005	Birgitta Ohlsson
2005–2008	Hillevi Larsson
2008–2009	Sofia Karlsson
2009–2013	Peter Althin
2013–2015	Mia Sydow Mölleby
2015–2019	Yasmine Larsson
2019–2021	Ulf Bergström
2021–2023	Olle Nykvist
2023–	Niclas Malmberg

== Republican of the Year Award ==
- 2005 Vilhelm Moberg (posthumously)
- 2006 Ann Svanberg
- 2007 Mikael Wiehe
- 2008 Karolina Fjellborg, journalist
- 2009 Johan Croneman, journalist
- 2010 Sydsvenskan, Lars Ohly, former party chairperson of the Left Party
- 2011 Lena Andersson, author and journalist
- 2012 Inga-Britt Ahlenius, civil servant
- 2013 Özz Nûjen, stand-up comedian
- 2014 Pehr G. Gyllenhammar, businessman
- 2015 Maria Ripenberg, journalist
- 2016 Emil Mörk, teacher
- 2017 not awarded
- 2018 Thomas Lyrevik, author
- 2019 Finland
- 2020 Joar Forssell, member of the Riksdag from the Liberal Party
- 2021 Csaba Bene Perlenberg, journalist
- 2022 Hana Al-Khamri, journalist

== See also ==
- Republicanism in Sweden
- Alliance of European Republican Movements
