= Republicanism in Sweden =

Political movement

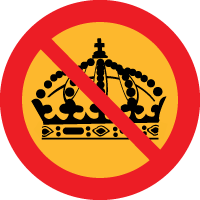
Old logo of the Swedish Republican Association

Republicanism in Sweden (Swedish: Republikanism) is the collective term for the movement in Sweden that seeks to establish a republic and abolish the Swedish constitutional monarchy.

Currently, Sweden is a parliamentary constitutional monarchy that has the King as the head of state and a prime minister as the head of government.

== Overview ==
A large part of the arguments for proclaiming a Swedish Republic are based on an ideological rejection of the monarchy, not necessarily on rejecting the individuals who actually exercise kingship. The effort towards a republic has been included in the early party platforms of the Social Democratic Party, the Left Party and the Green Party. Outside of the usual party lines, there is also the Swedish Republican Association.

== History ==
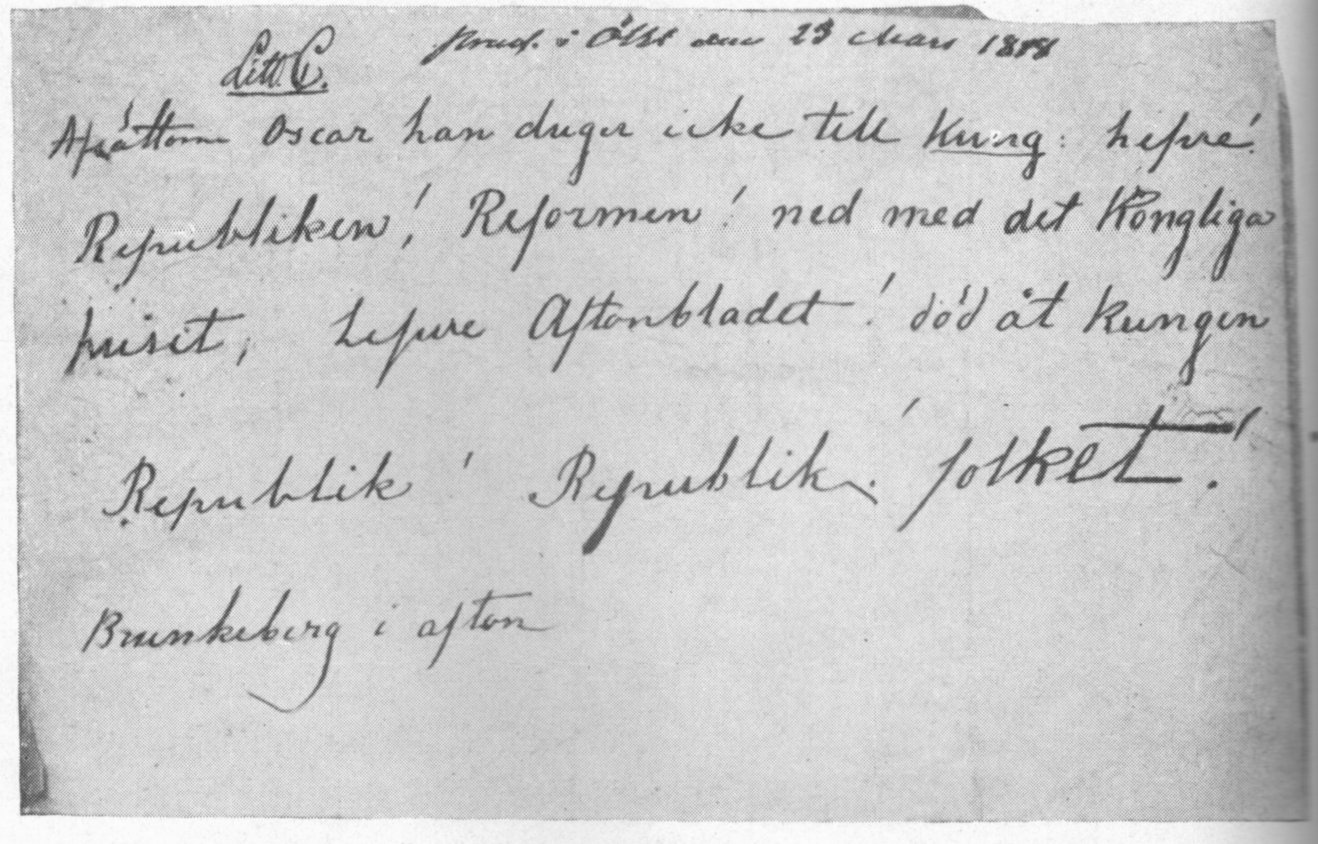
A revolutionary republican hand-written bill from the Stockholm riots during the Revolutions of 1848, reading: "Dethrone Oscar he is not fit to be a king – rather the Republic! Reform! Down with the Royal house – long live the Aftonbladet! Death to the king – Republic! Republic! – the people! Brunkeberg this evening." The writer's identity is unknown.

The precise year of the formation of the Kingdom of Sweden is lost to history, but Sweden was already a kingdom prior to the year 1000 AD and has never in its history been a republic.

Because of their trade with, for example, the Dutch Republic from the 16th century and onwards, the Swedes were not entirely unfamiliar with the phenomenon of a republic, but the first attempt to developing a republican Sweden came during the French Revolution. In the early 19th century, this was still a marginal movement. In 1830, it was for the first time that a prominent Swedish politician, Lars Johan Hierta, advocated for a republic, though without using the word "republic": in the newspaper Aftonbladet, that he himself had founded that same year, he pleaded for ousting king Charles XIV John of Sweden.

The next opportunity that a republic was discussed came during the European Revolutions of 1848. Sweden went through a short period of upheaval, the Marsoroligheterna ("March Disturbances"). On 18 and 19 March, riots broke out in Stockholm, during which about thirty people were killed by the army. During this time, controversial posters carrying the word "republic" were hung in several places in Stockholm and the surrounding region. Moreover, activists demanded equal and universal suffrage.

The Social Democratic Party had stated its intention to establish a republic in its party platform ever since its foundation in 1889. However, when it came into power in 1920, the desire had worn off. This is attributed to the pragmatism of its then leader Hjalmar Branting.

In 1997, the Swedish Republican Association was founded. In 2010, the umbrella Alliance of European Republican Movements (AERM) was founded in Stockholm, in which Swedish republicans cooperate with other European republican groups.

== Literature ==
- Monarkin Sverige – mot alla odds, in Nationalencyklopedin online
- Moberg, Vilhelm, Därför är jag republikan ("Why I Am A Republican") (1955)
