= Ewout Irrgang =

Dutch politician

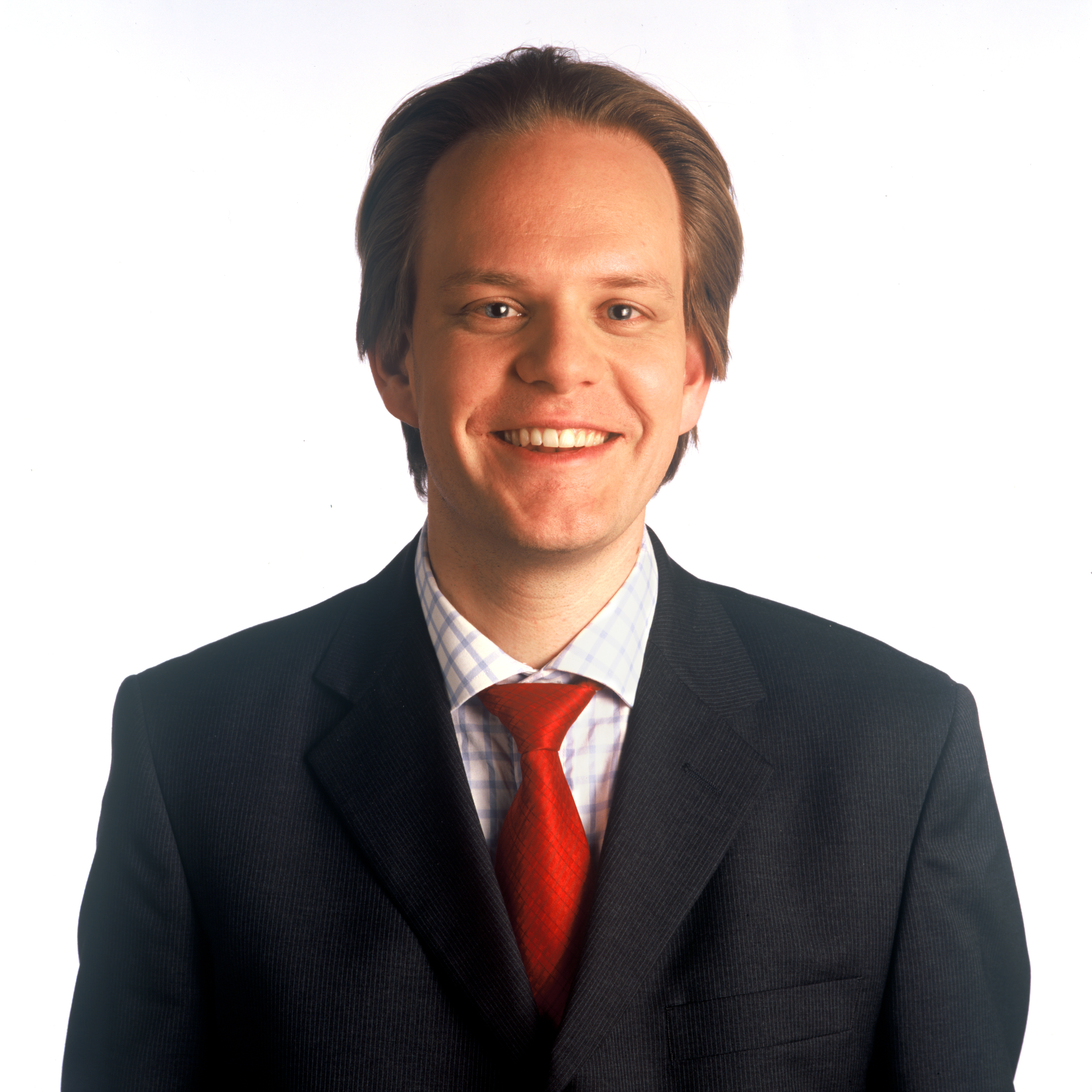

Member of the House of Representatives of the Netherlands
- In office 6 October 2005 – 19 September 2012

Personal details
- Born: Ewout Irrgang; 20 July 1976 (age 50) Utrecht, Netherlands
- Party: Socialist Party (Socialistische Partij - SP)
- Relations: Married
- Education: VU University Amsterdam (MA - Political science), University of Amsterdam (MA - Economics
- Occupation: Politician, banking employee
- Website: (in Dutch) Socialist Party website

Ewout Irrgang (born 20 July 1976 in Utrecht) is a former Dutch politician, anti-globalization activist and banking employee. As a member of the Socialist Party (Socialistische Partij) he was an MP from 6 October 2005 to 19 September 2012. He focused on matters of finance, development aid and globalization.

Irrgang studied political science at VU University Amsterdam and economics at the University of Amsterdam. He is the founder and head of the New Republican Society.
