= Norwegian Republican Association =

Norwegian political organisation

- Norge som republikk
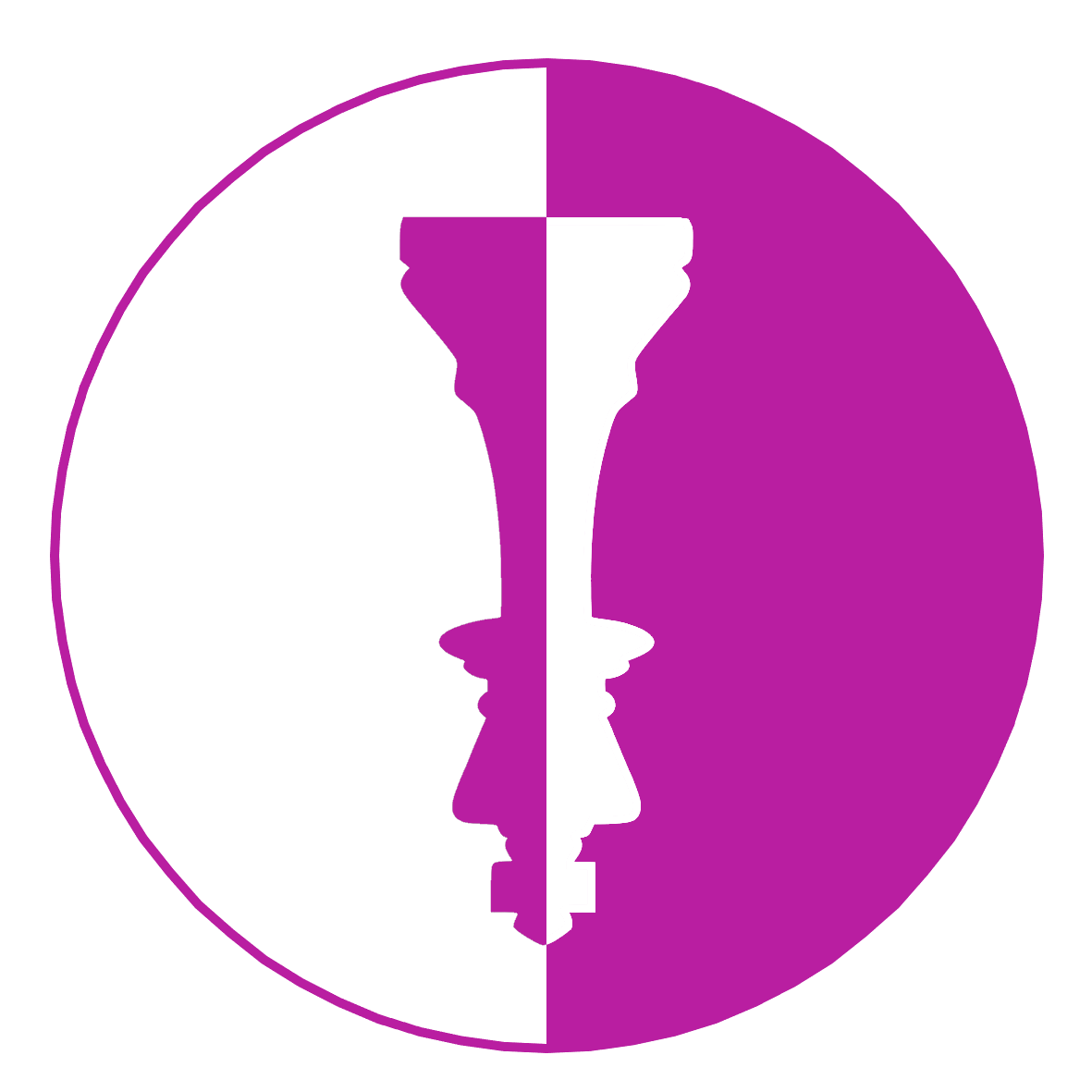
- Established: 12 December 2000; 25 years ago
- Type: Campaign group
- Leader: Craig Aaen-Stockdale
- Website: www.republikk.no

The Norwegian Republican Association (Norwegian: Norge som republikk, lit. 'Norway as a republic') is a Norwegian non-partisan campaign group whose goal is to abolish the monarchy in Norway and replace it with a republican form of government. The association's forerunner, Foreningen for republikk i Norge, was established on 12 December 2000.

The association is a founding member of the Alliance of European Republican Movements and has hosted the annual congress in Oslo in both 2014 and 2022.

The association has been active in connection with various proposals to change Norway's system of government that have been presented to the Norwegian parliament.

In June 2024, the association reported Princess Märtha Louise of Norway and her then-fiancée Durek Verrett to Oslo police over their alleged breach of Norway's strict alcohol advertising laws. In October 2024, they reported the Norwegian Palace to the Public Procurements Complaint Board (Klagenemnda for offentlige anskaffelser in Norwegian) after the architectural consultancy Snøhetta was awarded a contract for 20 million kroner to build a sarcophagus for the royal couple.

Membership in the organisation has increased dramatically following these events and especially in the wake of the recent indictments of Marius Borg Høiby for more than 30 alleged crimes, including four rapes, and the generally negative response to Märtha Louise and Durek Verrett's Netflix documentary Rebel Royals.

The former leader of the Young Liberals of Norway, Ane Breivik has previously been a board member of the association and the current leader of the association is Craig Aaen-Stockdale.

== Eksterne lenker ==
- Official Website
