= Peter Althin =

Swedish attorney and politician

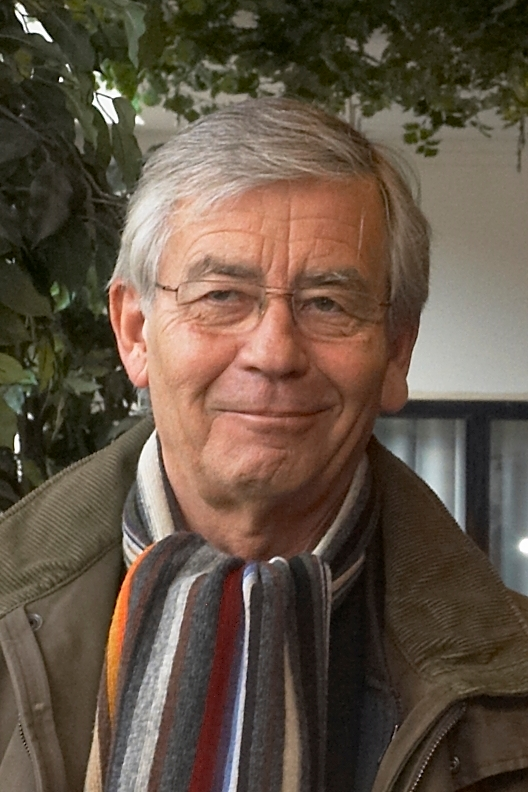
Peter Althin (2009)

Peter Althin is a Swedish attorney and politician and a member of the Swedish parliament for the Christian Democrats from 2002 to 2007.

Althin graduated from law school with a master's degree in law (jur. kand.) from Lund University in 1968 and joined the Swedish Bar Association in 1974. As a lawyer practicing criminal law he has defended notable clients like Tommy Alexandersson, Tony Olsson, Mehdi Ghezali, Joy Rahman and Mijailo Mijailović. Most recently, he defended Peter Sunde at the Pirate Bay trial.

Since 2002, Althin is a member of the Swedish parliament where he is a substitute in the justice committee and constitutional committee. Althin is also a member of the executive board of the Christian Democrat Party. He is also often seen in the media, not only regarding cases where he is hired as a defense attorney but also as a commentator. Despite his position as an MP he has continued his law practice, the Anna Lindh-case has been his most time-consuming so far.

Between 2009 and 2013, Althin was the chairman of the Swedish Republican Association.

== See also ==
- Swedish Republican Association
