= Niclas Malmberg =

Swedish politician (born 1970)

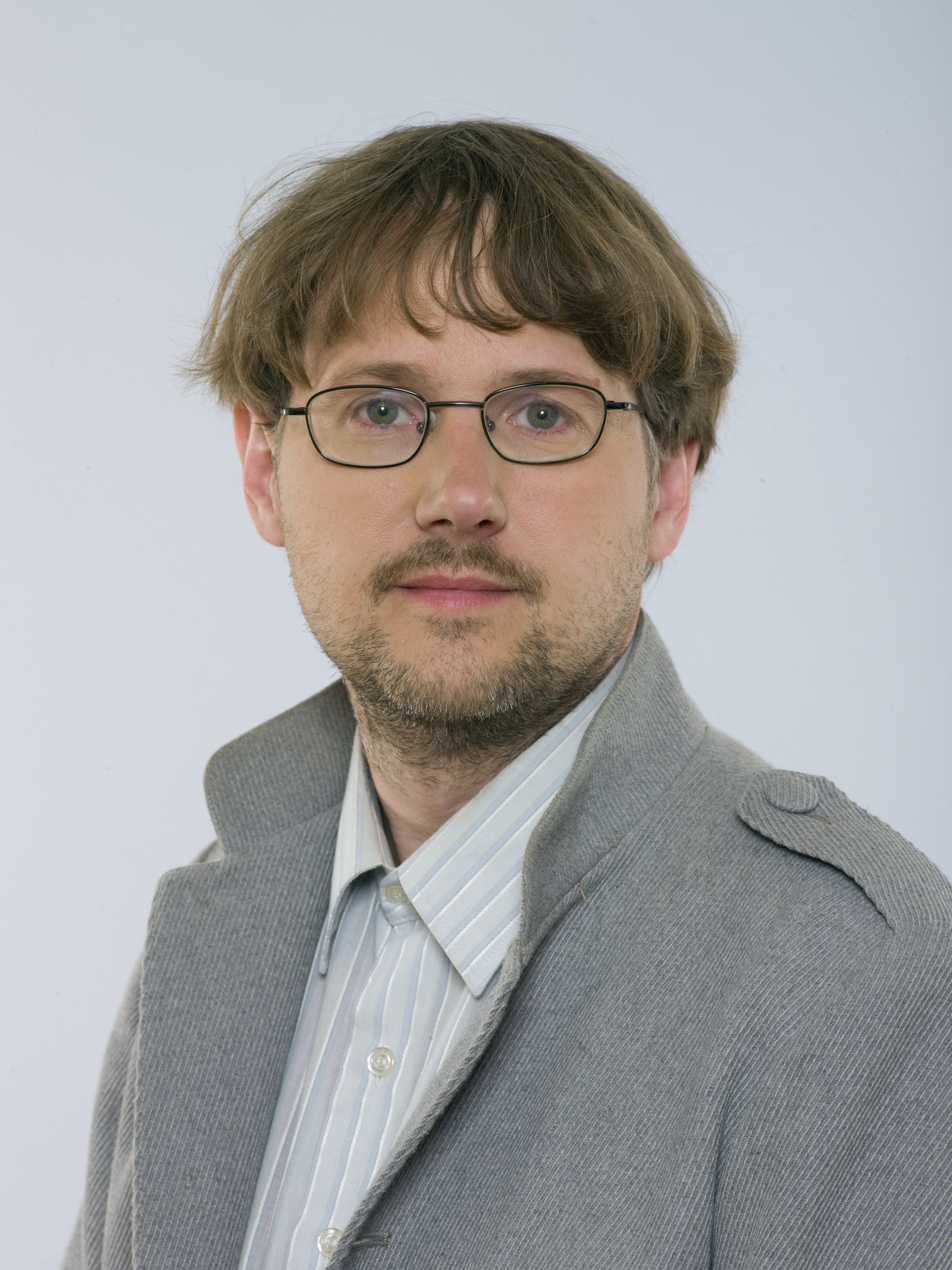
Malmberg in 2010

Niclas Fredrik Olof Malmberg (born May 4, 1970) is a Swedish politician, who in 2014–2018 was a member of the Riksdag (Swedish parliament) and cultural and media policy spokesperson for the Green Party and a member of the Riksdag's Culture Committee.

== Biography ==
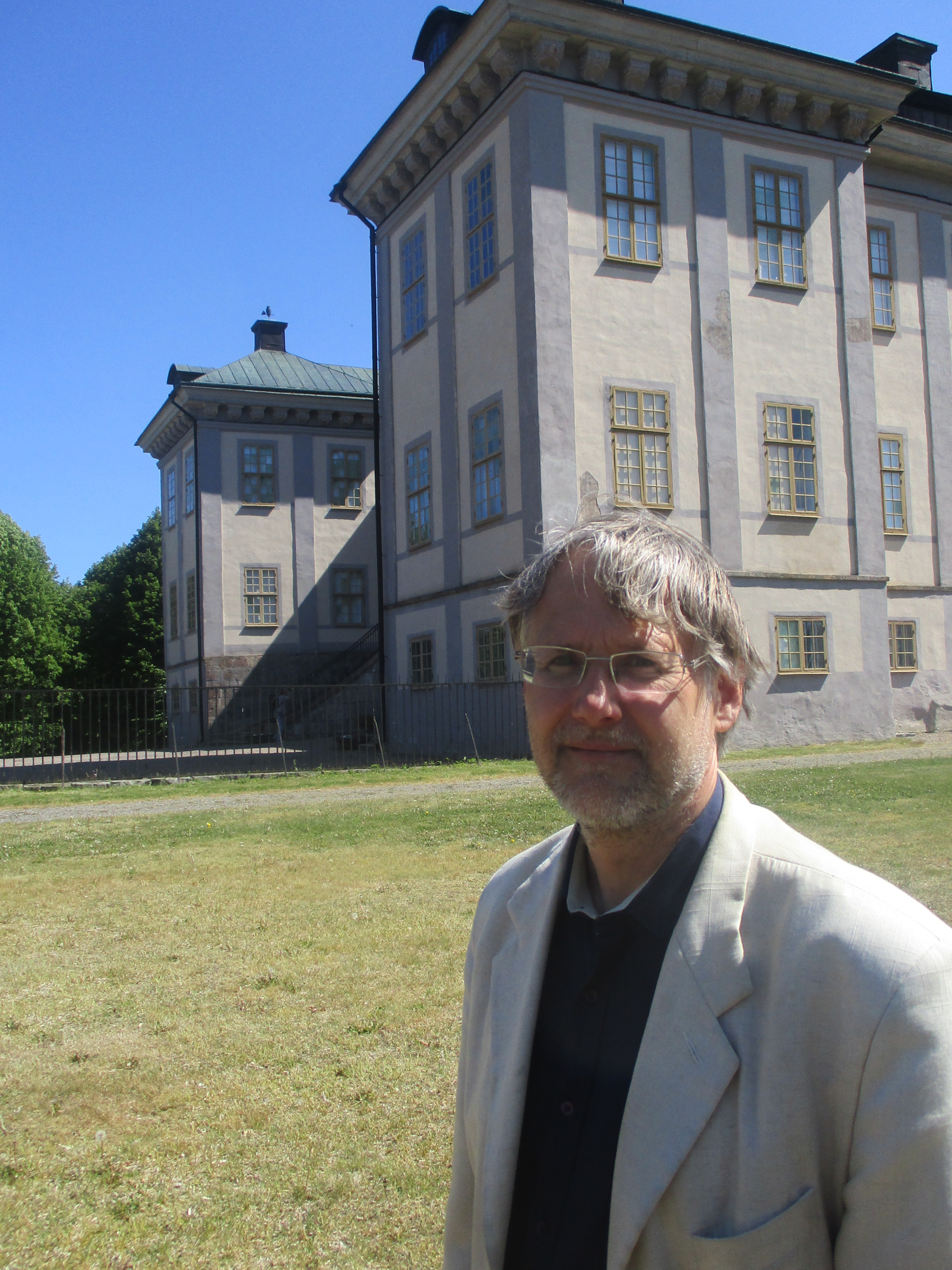
Malmberg on duty at Salsta in 2023

Malmberg has a degree as a science journalist from JMK, and has worked as an editor at Östhammar's news and free newspaper in Uppsala. During 1995–1997, Malmberg was a convener of the Young Greens.

Malmberg was municipal commissioner in Uppsala between 2002 and 2010 for the Green Party. Since 2007, he has been a member of the Administrative Foundation for Swedish Radio, Swedish Television and Educational Radio, and since 2009 a member of the Press Support Committee. He was also a member of the state inquiry into press support, Diversity and Reach, and the Media Constitution Committee. Malmberg joined the Government in September 2016. Since 2013, he has been a board member of Sweden's wind power cooperative and since 2017 a member of the Public broadcasting Inquiry.

Since 2016, Malmberg has been chairman of the Green Party in Uppsala County.

Malmberg has also worked as an editor and writer, including writing a textbook on the climate issue aimed at children and young people, the "Little Climate Book", and the music story "Operation save the park". In 2020 he began creating special palace events at Salsta.

In 2023 Malmberg was elected Chairperson of the Swedish Republican Association.

== Intimidation letter received from the Chinese Embassy ==
On August 19, 2020, Malmberg revealed a threatening letter sent to him by the Chinese Embassy in Sweden. The letter requested that he should not speak for Falun Gong, threatened his reputation and demanded a meeting with him.
