= Rik Smits (linguist) =

Dutch linguist and writer (born 1953)

- Born: Reinier Johannes Charles Smits; 30 September 1953 (age 72) The Hague, Netherlands
- Occupation: Linguist, author, editor

Website
- peptalks.nl

Reinier Johannes Charles "Rik" Smits (born 1953 in The Hague) is a Dutch linguist, author, translator and editor with a wide range of interests.

As a linguist he specialized in generative syntax, taking a PhD in General Linguistics in 1989. From then on, he mainly pursued a writing career, informing the general public on linguistic matters theoretical and practical. Apart from linguistics, he published hundreds of articles and interviews on subjects like the brain, ICT and its ramifications, modern media, intellectual property, freedom of speech, copyright and other fundamental rights, history, ethics and politics.

Smits published books on subjects ranging from language via handedness and laterality to history and French cuisine, mostly in Dutch. Books in English comprise The Puzzle of Left-handedness, which deals with the cultural, biological and evolutionary aspects of human handedness and the notions of left, right and symmetry in biology, psychology, art and life in general, and the above-mentioned Dawn, the Origins of Language and the Modern Human Mind, an inquiry into why, how and when the human language faculty - and with it the truly modern mind - developed. For the earlier Dutch version of this book he won the LOT-award 2010. Smits shows that human language is not only truly human, representing a clear and fundamental break between "us" and the animal kingdom, and that it could not have arisen for communicative purposes - that came later.

From 2008-2015 he was the editor of De Republikein (The Republican), a quarterly on modern constitutional democracy and citizenship.

Translations include Simon Goldhill's Love, Sex and Tragedy; how the Ancient World Shapes our Lives (Liefde, seks en tragedie; hoe de oudheid ons heeft gevormd, Nieuw Amsterdam, 2012), Bill O'Reilly & Martin Dugard's Killing Kennedy; the End of Camelot (Killing Kennedy, het einde van een droom, Nieuw Amsterdam, 2012) and Litter; how other People's Rubbish Shapes our Lives (Andermans rotzooi, Nieuw Amsterdam, 2012) by Theodore Dalrymple.

== Books ==
Title	Publisher/year	Genre	Notes
The Art of Verbal Welfare	Reaktion Books	Culture, sociology	In preparation
Dawn: The Origins of Language and the Modern Human Mind	Transaction Publishers, 2016 ISBN 978-1-4128-6265-3	Science	
The Puzzle of Left-Handedness	Reaktion Books/University of Chicago Press, 2011 ISBN 978-1-86189-873-9	Science	
Eurogrammar 1: The Relative and Cleft Constructions of the Germanic and Romance Language	Foris/Walter de Gruyter, 1989 ISBN 978-90-6765-434-0	Doctoral Thesis	
In Dutch			
Rebellen, Een dwarse geschiedenis van 200 jaar Nederland	Nieuw Amsterdam, 2013 ISBN 978-90-468-1578-6	History	
Het raadsel van linkshandigheid	Nieuw Amsterdam, 2010 ISBN 978-90-468-0744-6	Science	
Dageraad, Hoe taal de mens maakte	Nieuw Amsterdam, 2009 SBN 978-90-468-0389-9	Science	
Handboek Nederlands	Bijleveld, 2004 ISBN 90-6131-956-0	Language	with Liesbeth Koenen
E-mail etiquette	Podium, 2000 ISBN 90-5759-253-3	Language	with Liesbeth Koenen
La Carte, Tafelwoordenboek voor de Franse Keuken	Atlas, 1997 / Podium, 2002 ISBN 978-90-5759-191-4	Travel, food	App iOS/Android
De Keuken van Argus	Atlas, 1996 ISBN 90-254-0528-2	Journalism	with Liesbeth Koenen and Mans Kuipers
Basishandleiding Nederlands	Bijleveld, 1995-2004 ISBN 90-6131-955-2	Language	with Liesbeth Koenen
De Linkshandige Picador	Nijgh & Van Ditmar, 1993 ISBN 90-388-7045-0	Science	
Cultureel Woordenboek	Anthos, 1992/2003	Language	with Liesbeth Koenen
Peptalk - Engels Woordgebruik in de Nederlandse Taal	Nijgh & Van Ditmar, 1992 ISBN 90-388-4346-1	Language	with Liesbeth Koenen
