= Alliance of European Republican Movements =

Movement that advocates a republic form of government across Europe

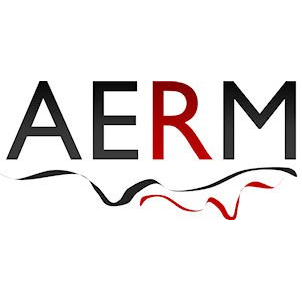
- Abbreviation: AERM
- Formation: 19 June 2010
- Purpose: Advocacy of republicanism
- Headquarters: Stockholm
- Region served: Europe
- Campaign Director: Bram van Montfoort
- Chair: Graham Smith
- Website: www.aerm.org

The Alliance of European Republican Movements (AERM) is a grouping of republican movements from across Europe. It was established in Stockholm in June 2010, after the wedding of Swedish Crown Princess Victoria and Daniel Westling. The aim of the AERM is to provide a network for cross-party republican movements in all the countries of Europe that have a monarch as their head of state, in order to share information, resources and ideas and provide mutual assistance. Each member organisation will retain their autonomous national campaigns however, in recognition of their particular political and constitutional circumstances.

There are currently twelve extant monarchies in Europe. AERM has member organisations in six of these: Denmark, the Netherlands, Norway, Spain, Sweden, and the United Kingdom. It formerly had a presence in Belgium but the Belgian republican movement is no longer represented in AERM.

The AERM protested against the wedding of British Prince William and Catherine Middleton on 29 April 2011 in London, and planned to meet each year thereafter.

The AERM protested during the Coronation of King Charles. A video report on its Twitter channel about the arrest of protest organisers gathered millions of views and the interest of international media.

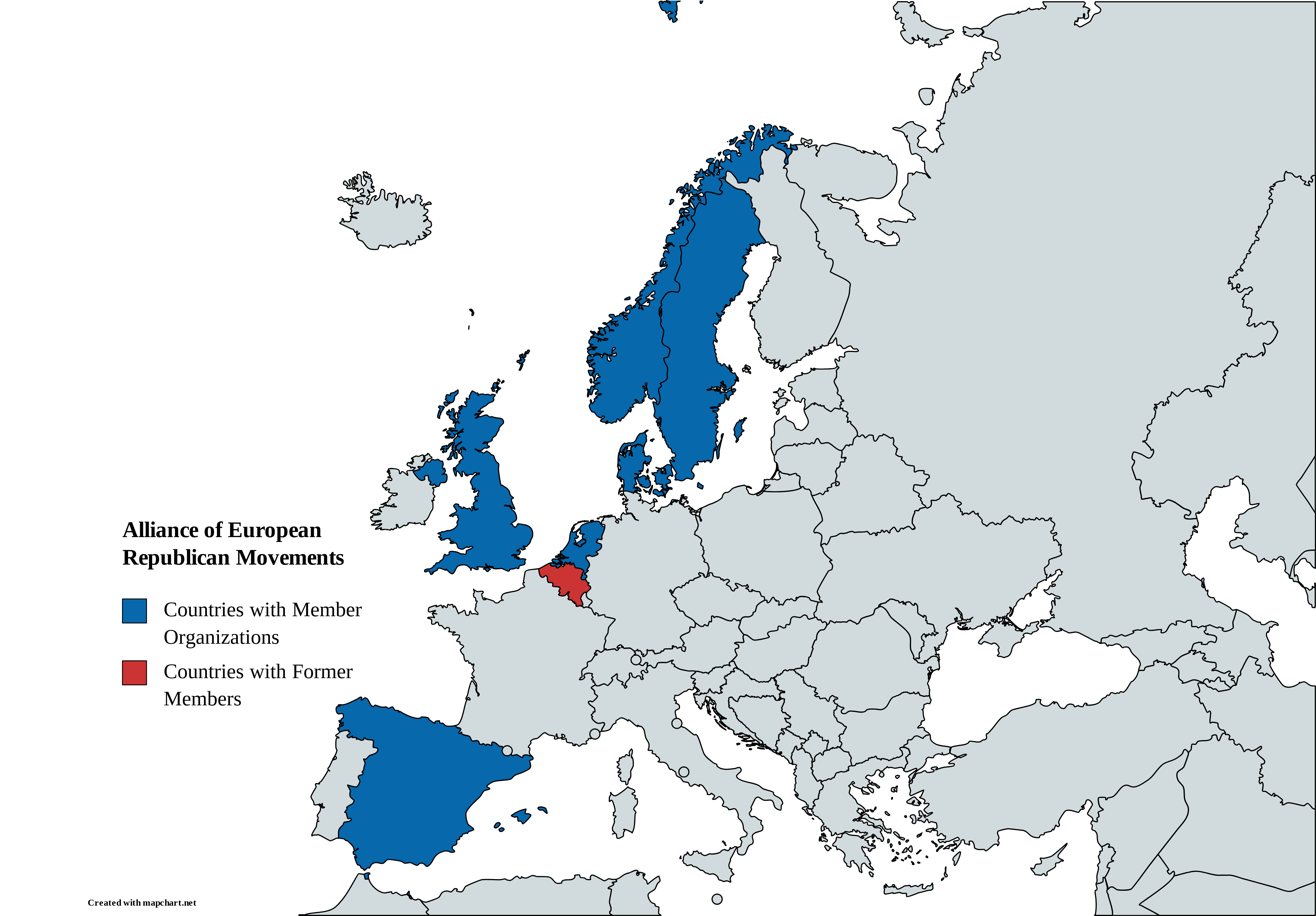
Map of Alliance of European Republican Movements member organizations

== Member organisations ==
- Denmark: Republik nu (formerly DRGB or Den Republikanske Grundlovsbevægelse or The Republican Constitutional Movement), launched in 2010.
- Netherlands: Republiek. (Formerly New Republican Society (NRG)).
- Norway: The Norwegian republican association Norge Som Republikk was founded in December 2000.
- Spain: In Spain the member organisation of AERM is Red Inter-Civico Republicana, a group that seeks to draw together the various strands of Spanish republicanism to campaign for the Spanish Third Republic.
- Sweden: The Republikanska Föreningen or Swedish Republican Association campaigns for a republic in Sweden based on the Finnish model.
- United Kingdom: The main republican organisation in Britain is Republic, reinvented as a campaigning pressure group in 2006.

== Former members ==
- Belgium: The Republican Circle (CRK), variously known in the three official languages of Belgium as Cercle républicain, Republikeinse Kring and Republikanischer Kreis, is no longer a member according to AERM's website.

== AERM Conventions ==
- 2010: Stockholm, Sweden
- 2011: London, United Kingdom
- 2012: Copenhagen, Denmark
- 2013: Brussels, Belgium
- 2014: Oslo, Norway
- 2015: Amsterdam, Netherlands
- 2016: Madrid, Spain
- 2017: Västerås, Sweden
- 2018: London, United Kingdom
- 2019: Copenhagen, Denmark
- 2020: Cancelled because of the COVID-19 pandemic
- 2021: Utrecht and Amsterdam, Netherlands
- 2022: Oslo, Norway
- 2023: Stockholm, Sweden
- 2024: Manchester, United Kingdom

== See also ==
- Dissolution of the union between Norway and Sweden
- Faroese independence movement
- Labour for a Republic
- Monarchies in Europe
- Republic (Faroe Islands)
- Republicanism in Spain
- Republicanism in Sweden
- Republicanism in Norway
- Republicanism in the Netherlands
- Republicanism in the United Kingdom
- Scottish independence
