= Republican Circle =

Belgian republican organization

Cercle républicain Republikeinse Kring Republikanischer Kreis
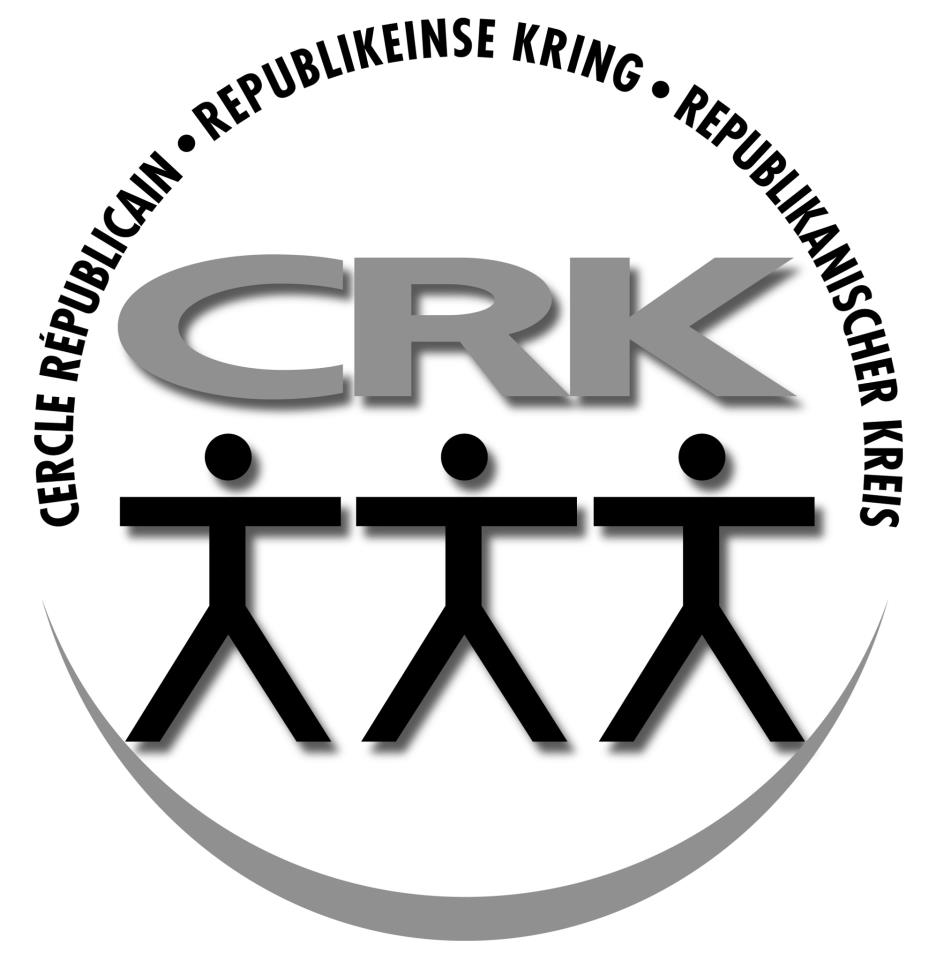
- Formation: 1 January 2000
- Type: Association without lucrative purpose
- Purpose: Advocacy of republicanism
- Region served: Belgium
- Chair: Philipp Bekaert
- Affiliations: Alliance of European Republican Movements (formerly)

The Republican Circle or CRK (Dutch: Republikeinse Kring, French: Cercle républicain, German: Republikanischer Kreis) is a Belgian trilingual republican association that aims to promote republican values and various republican forms of government whilst respecting cultural specificities.

== History ==
The association was founded on 1 January 2000, and organises debates, spreads information and provides speakers to conferences. The cause for its foundation was the wedding of Prince Philippe and Princess Mathilde in 1999. Some prominent members are Claude Boumal, Nadia Geerts (chair 2000–2010) and Philipp Bekaert (chair in 2013), all three of them connected to the VUB-ULB. In 2011, the CRK had 'a few hundred members'. There are both Francophone and Dutch-speaking members, and according to Bekaert, with the exception of Vlaams Belang, almost all political parties are represented. The association is mainly trying to argue that the monarchy is a backward and undemocratic institute. It does not take a position on a potential partition of Belgium. Bekaert himself opined that Belgium is not 'too complex' to require a king for stability between the communities, because Switzerland, despite having its own linguistic conflicts, has not had any need for a monarch in its long republican tradition either.

In August 2000, CRK members called for reopening the discussion about the monarchy. Amongst other things they recalled the Royal Question and the assassination of Julien Lahaut, leader of the Communist Party of Belgium, who allegedly yelled "Vive la république!" ("Long live the republic!") during the inauguration of Baudouin on 11 August 1950, which was repeated by Jean-Pierre Van Rossem in 1993. They emphasised that 'the monarchy is not more legitimate today than yesterday'.

On the occasion of the European Union's expansion on 1 May 2004, thirteen republican organisations from all the EU's monarchies petitioned the European Parliament to abolish the monarchy in the entire European Union. The petition was an initiative of the Republican Circle (CRK).

From 2003 until 2007, the association annually awarded the 'Prize for Vocal Republican Citizenship' and the 'Prize for Submissiveness to His Majesty'.

Vocal Republican Citizen
- 2003: Frieda Brepoels
- 2004: Peter Bate
- 2005: Delphine Boël
- 2006: Claude Semal
- 2007: Bob Elbracht
His Majesty's Subject
- 2003: Anne Quevrin
- 2004: Francis Delpérée
- 2005: ?
- 2006: Philippe Moureaux
- 2007: Armand De Decker

The CRK conducted an inquiry on how expensive a republic would be in comparison to a monarchy, and found that Belgian citizens pay three times the amount for their king than Germans do for President and a hundred times the amount the Swiss pay for their President. The CRK concluded that it's a 'myth' that republics are more expensive than monarchies, especially in the case of a parliamentary republic in which the president is appointed by Parliament (like in Germany, Israel and Italy) without expensive direct elections.

In 2010, the CRK became a member of the Alliance of European Republican Movements (AERM). In March 2013, the CRK hosted the AERM convention in Brussels.
