= Republiek (political organisation) =

Organization

Republiek Dutch Republic Movement
- Formation: 21 January 1998
- Type: Nonprofit organisation
- Purpose: Advocating that the Netherlands become a republic
- Headquarters: Oudegracht 36, Utrecht, The Netherlands
- Region served: Netherlands
- Members: 3,780
- Chair: Floris Müller
- Campaign Manager: Bram van Montfoort
- Affiliations: Alliance of European Republican Movements
- Website: republiek.org

Republiek is a Dutch republican pressure group advocating for the replacement of the Dutch Monarchy with a de jure parliamentary republic, founded in January 1998 in Amsterdam by Ewout Irrgang and Elisabeth van der Steenhoven, under the previous name Nieuw Republikeins Genootschap (NRG). It is a member organisation of the Alliance of European Republican Movements and is currently the largest organisation solely campaigning for a republican constitution for The Netherlands. Republiek states that its mission is: "To achieve the abolition of the Dutch monarchy in favour of a democratic republic".

== Aims ==
Republiek opposes the Dutch monarchy because of its hereditary nature and seeks to form a parliamentary republic through democratic means. Republiek seeks to bridge the discrepancy between the Dutch form of government and its democratic order by creating a republican form of government. It aims to achieve this by critically examining incidents and developments and stimulating discussion of the matter. Republiek is active in this field both nationally and regionally.

The association only wants to make use of legal means, including both spoken and written word. All forms of physical violence, as well as activities that are contrary to generally accepted forms of behaviour, are explicitly rejected. This includes personal attacks, for example on the members of the royal family. The association is open to anyone, regardless of political conviction or social standing, and has both members and sympathisers.

== History ==
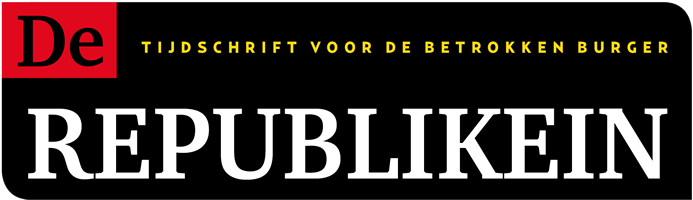
De Republikein, magazine of the 'old' and New Republicans

The immediate causes of the establishment of the NRG were the celebrations which marked the sixtieth anniversary of Queen Beatrix and the closing of the Dam in Amsterdam for these festivities. On 20 January 1998, the NRG released a Republican manifesto, and on 29 January of the same year former NRG spokesman Erik van den Muijzenberg, under the eyes of the international press, proclaimed the Third Republic of the Netherlands on Dam Square.

In 2005, the Republican Society and New Republican Society co-founded the magazine De Republikein ("The Republican"); all 1300 NRG members at the time automatically became subscribers.

From a small movement with a few members, the organization in eight years' time grew into a union with more than 1,300 members and seven regional offices as of 2006.

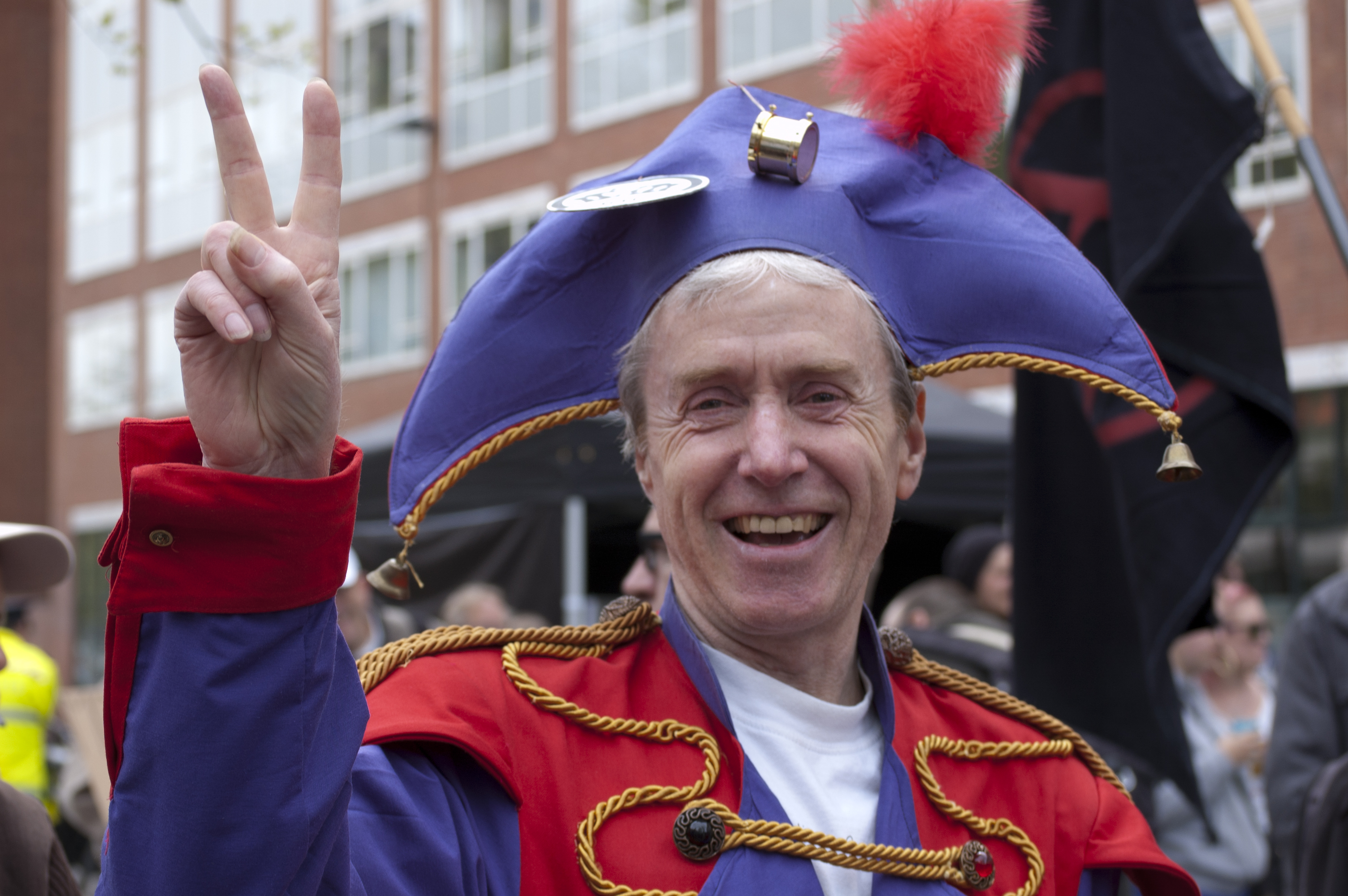
The NRG states the royal house is outdated, and thus protested against the monarchy on 30 April 2013

The society protested the wedding of Crown Prince Willem-Alexander and Princess Maxima Zorreguieta on 2 February 2002.

Following the enlargement of the European Union, thirteen Republican organizations from all the monarchies of the EU on 1 May 2004, sent a petition to the European Parliament. The thirteen organizations asked the abolishment of constitutional monarchy throughout the European Union. The petition is an initiative of the Belgian Republican Circle (Republikeinse Kring-CRK). In the Netherlands, the petition was signed by the NRG.

In June 2010, several European republican movements, including the NRG, founded the AERM: the Alliance of European Republican Movements. This organisation is an umbrella of republican organisations in the seven main European countries that are still monarchies.

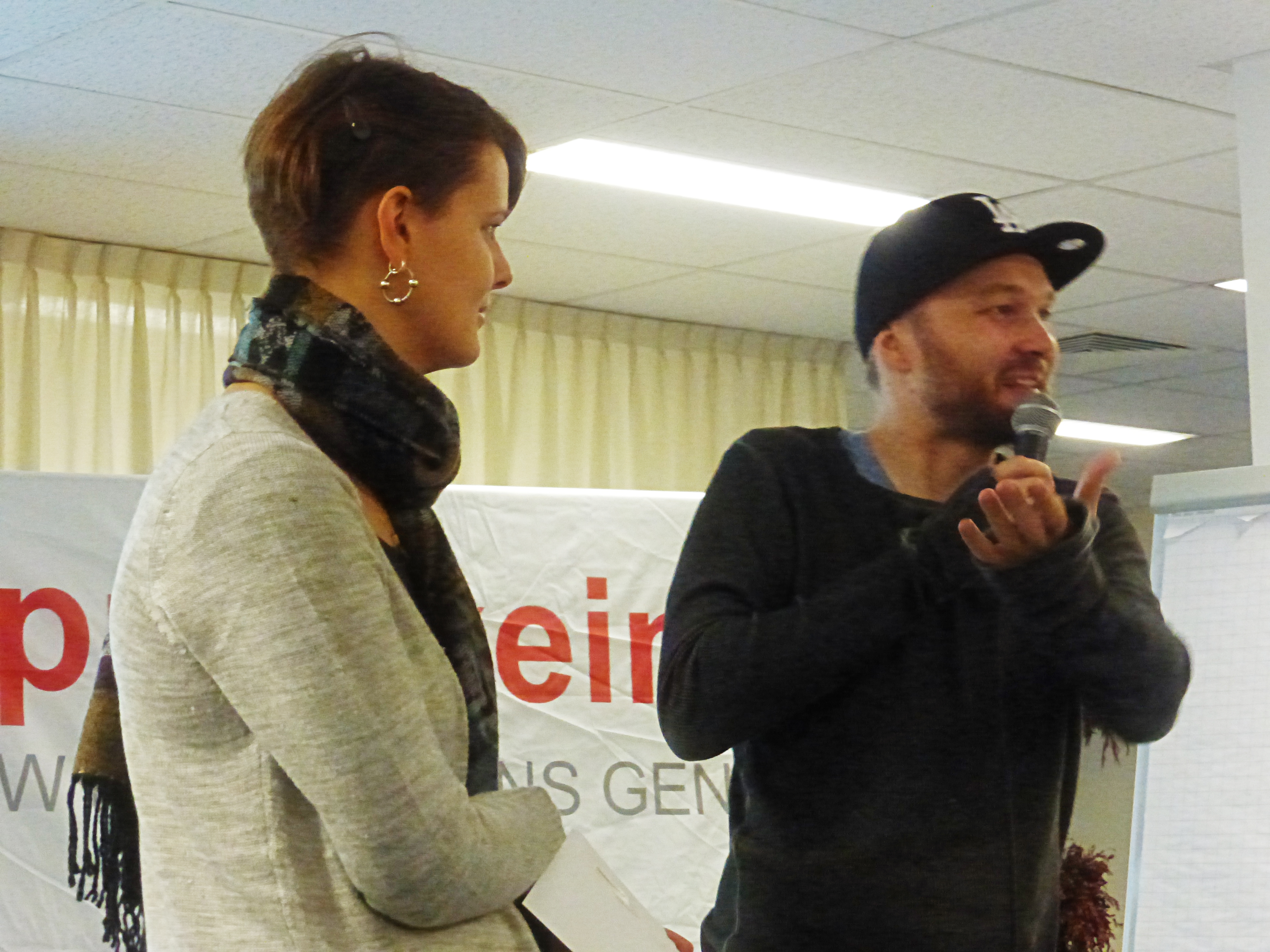
In 2015, Arjen Lubach succeeded Joanna (left) as Republican of the Year for satirising the Dutch monarchy

In early April 2013, the NRG reported having seen its membership grow rapidly by 800 people in the preceding two months (on top of the 1200 there were in January). It attributed this growth to the 'Orange hype' in the run-up to the investiture of Willem-Alexander later that month. Chair Anjo Clement claimed on 21 April 2013 that the monarchy would not exist in twenty years' time, because of the bumpy road Willem-Alexander has had on his way to become king, especially regarding his villa in Mozambique and the denial of Zorreguieta's part in Argentina's dictatorship during the Dirty War. A citizen's initiative on the monarch's salary started by the NRG was signed by over 13,000 people.

Each year, the NRG awards the title of Republican of the Year to the person that has best encouraged discussion on the abolishment of the monarchy. In 2015, comedian Arjen Lubach was given the award for the 22 March 2015 episode of his satirical talkshow Zondag met Lubach, in which he mocked the monarchy by proclaiming himself "Pharaoh of the Netherlands" and launched a citizens' initiative with more than 100,000 signatures to confirm it. He succeeded Utrecht student Joanna, who in 2013 caused national uproar by publicly protesting with a sign that said: "Weg met de monarchie. Het is 2013." ("Down with the monarchy. It's 2013").

== Organisation ==
From 2020, the board of Republiek has been formed by a General Board and a Daily Board. The daily board has a seat on the general board and is supported in its activities by a campaign team. Floris Müller has been chairman since 2020, Bram van Montfoort has been working as a campaign manager since 2018.

== Offsplits ==
Pro Republica logo

- At the end of 2003, disagreement arose in the NRG about the invitation policy for an NRG theme night. In protest, Peter Nugter of the Republican Socialists, founded the New Republican Fellowship in 2004. This association has never become active, and was later dissolved.
- In September 2004, board member Frits Hoogesteger left. He accused the NRG of onesidedness, because it allegedly only invited left-wing speakers. In January 2005, Hoogesteger founded the Republican Platform. Its website was updated for the last time in 2005.
- Pro Republica emerged from the seceded North Brabant regional branch of the NRG. After a period of division, it resumed collaboration with the NRG.
