= Prince Joachim Albert of Prussia =

Member of the House of Hohenzollern (1876–1939)

Prince Joachim Albert
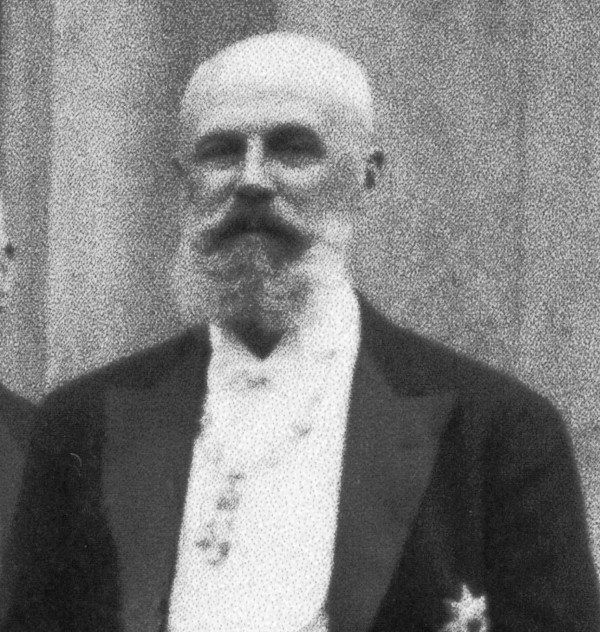
- Prince Joachim Albrecht, May 1928 Castle Kamenz
- Born: 27 September 1876; Hanover
- Died: 24 October 1939 (aged 63)
- Spouse: Marie Blich-Sulzer (m. 1909; died 1919) Karoline Kornelia Stockhammer (m. 1920; div. 1936)
Names
- German: Wilhelm Friedrich Karl Ernst Joachim Albrecht
- House: House of Hohenzollern
- Father: Prince Albert of Prussia
- Mother: Princess Marie of Saxe-Altenburg

Prince Joachim of Prussia (27 September 1876 – 24 October 1939) was a member of the House of Hohenzollern. He was the second eldest son of Prince Albert of Prussia and his wife Princess Marie of Saxe-Altenburg. He is notable for composing music, in particular military waltzes.

== Family and early life ==
Prince Joachim's paternal grandparents were Prince Albert of Prussia and Princess Marianne of the Netherlands. His maternal grandparents were Ernst I, Duke of Saxe-Altenburg and Agnes of Anhalt-Dessau.

Joachim had two brothers: Friedrich Heinrich Albrecht (1874–1940) and Friedrich Wilhelm (1880–1925).

In 1885, Joachim's father Prince Albert was chosen as regent for the Duchy of Brunswick. Like all male Hohenzollerns, Joachim and his brothers entered the army and became officers. Music always appealed to him however, and he soon made a name for himself composing. In 1898, he presented a military waltz he wrote to a family gathering at the Neues Palais in Potsdam. An orchestra played it, while Emperor Wilhelm conducted it with his baton. In 1905, he wrote the libretto and pantomime for "The Apple of Paris", which was well received in Berlin. He also composed ballets and symphonies, and wrote a volume of poetry and painted. During World War I, Joachim served with distinction until he received a war wound. This wound effectively ended his military career and allowed him to completely focus on his music.

== Marriages ==
On 3 September 1909, Joachim married Baroness Marie of Liebenberg (née Blich-Sulzer) (1872-1919) in Ischl, Austria. The marriage was never recognized by the family, and he had many public clashes with ex-Emperor Wilhelm. According to some sources, a previous marriage had led to Wilhelm banishing him by stationing him with the German colonial army in Africa; it is also believed that his resignation was demanded. His inheritance was also dramatically reduced. After the death of his first wife, he married secondly to Karoline Kornelia Stockhammer (1891-1952) on 9 October 1920 in Vienna. The couple divorced in 1936. Joachim died three years later, on 24 October 1939.

== Music ==
Like many of his family, Prince Joachim had a great love of music. Unlike the rest of them however, he spent his whole life playing and performing in different cities around the world. He also was an accomplished violin and cello player. He described himself as old-fashioned, especially in relation to music. He stated in 1927 that he was old-fashioned "because I am a thoroughly healthy individual. Much modern music is unnatural and discordant because composers and audiences have jaded nerves which need stirring up. I want my hearers to leave my concerts with the feeling that I have furnished them with esthetic [sic] delight and instilled harmony and beauty into their souls".

In 1920, Joachim was ordered under arrest by the German Minister of Defense Gustav Noske after he got into a fight with some French military officers. The dispute apparently began after a few of the aforementioned officers failed to stand up when musicians in a nightclub began to play the national anthem "Deutschland Uber Alles". The fight soon escalated, so that many bystanders joined in to defend both sides. Although he later denied his actions, enough scorn emerged against him among most of Europe's newspapers to merit the event's impact on his reputation.

In 1926, Joachim accepted an invitation to present his compositions in a series of concerts in leading American cities. He received this invite after playing in a number of welfare concerts in Berlin, and conducting his own works throughout the previous summer in Central Germany. One such concert was planned for Newark, in which Joachim would be conducting an orchestra to music written by himself. All of these concerts would have been done for various charitable organizations. After his arrival in the United States however, it soon emerged that he would do no performing while in the country.

== Ancestry ==
Ancestors of Prince Joachim Albert of Prussia

8. Frederick William III of Prussia
4. Prince Albert of Prussia
9. Duchess Louise of Mecklenburg-Strelitz
2. Prince Albert of Prussia
10. William I of the Netherlands
5. Princess Marianne of the Netherlands
11. Princess Wilhelmine of Prussia
1. Prince Joachim of Prussia
12. Georg, Duke of Saxe-Altenburg
6. Ernst I, Duke of Saxe-Altenburg
13. Duchess Marie Louise of Mecklenburg-Schwerin
3. Princess Marie of Saxe-Altenburg
14. Leopold IV, Duke of Anhalt
7. Princess Agnes of Anhalt-Dessau
15. Princess Frederica of Prussia
