= Prince Friedrich Wilhelm of Prussia =

Prince of Prussia (1880–1925)

Prince Friedrich Wilhelm
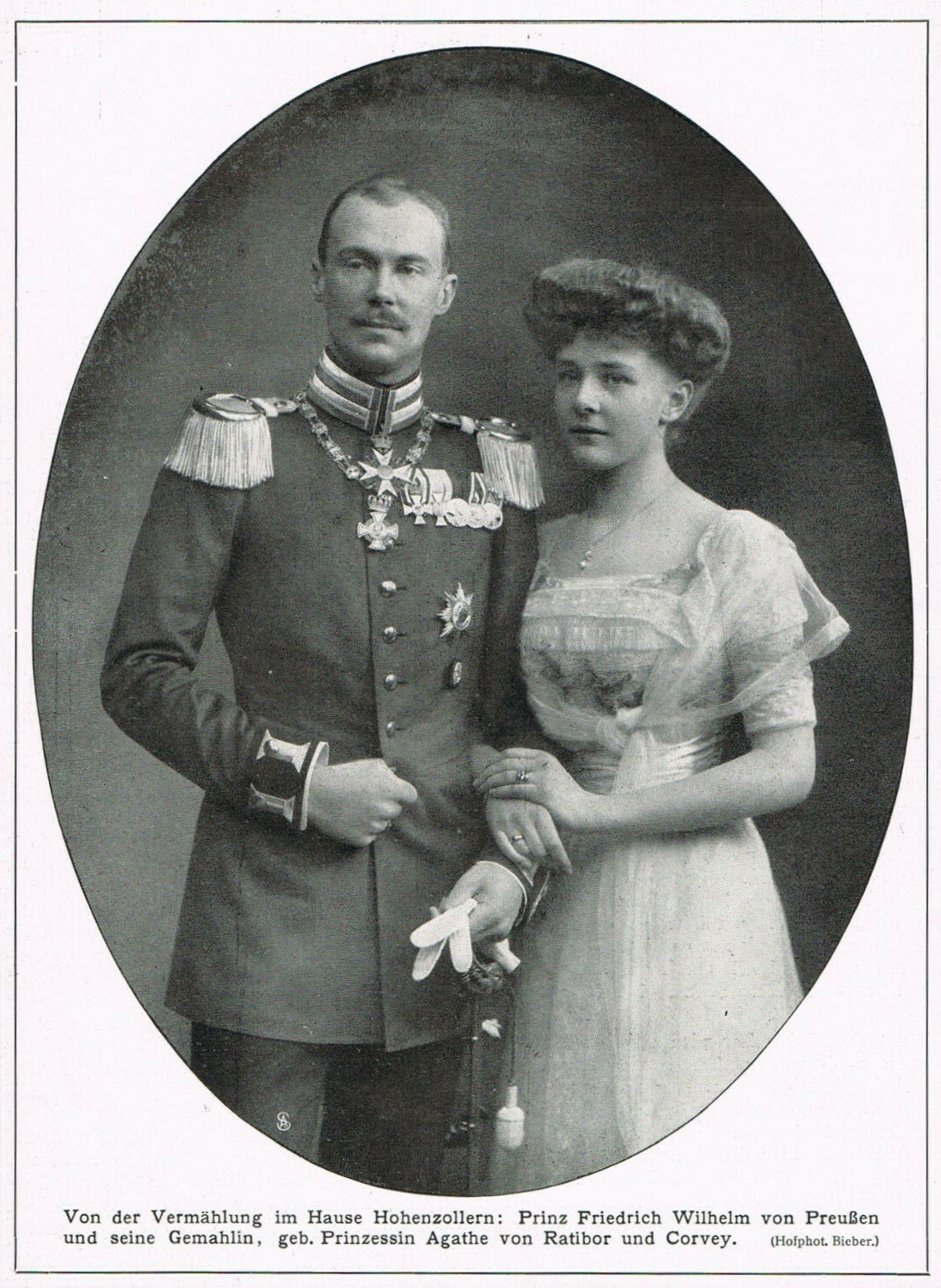
- Friedrich Wilhelm and his wife Agatha, 1910
- Born: 12 July 1880; Kamenz, Kingdom of Prussia, German Empire
- Died: 9 March 1925 (aged 44); Dresden, Weimar Republic
- Burial: Kamenz
- Spouse: Princess Agatha of Hohenlohe-Schillingsfürst (m. 1910)
- Issue: Princess Marie Therese, Mrs. Hug; Princess Louise Henriette, Mrs. Schmalz; Marianne, Princess Wilhelm of Hesse-Philippsthal-Barchfeld; Princess Elisabeth, Mrs. Mees
Names
- German: Friedrich Wilhelm Viktor Karl Ernst Alexander Heinrich
- House: Hohenzollern
- Father: Prince Albert of Prussia
- Mother: Princess Marie of Saxe-Altenburg

Prince Friedrich Wilhelm of Prussia (German: Friedrich Wilhelm Viktor Karl Ernst Alexander Heinrich Prinz von Preußen; 12 July 1880 – 9 March 1925) was a member of the House of Hohenzollern, great-grandson of King Frederick William III of Prussia.

== Early life and education ==
Friedrich Wilhelm was born at Kamenz Palace in Kamenz, Kingdom of Prussia, (now Kamieniec Ząbkowicki, Poland) youngest child of Prince Albert of Prussia (1837–1906), (son of Prince Albert of Prussia and Princess Marianne of the Netherlands) and his wife, Princess Marie of Saxe-Altenburg (1854–1898), (daughter of Ernst I, Duke of Saxe-Altenburg and Princess Agnes of Anhalt-Dessau). He was a great-grandson of King Frederick William III of Prussia and King William I of the Netherlands. He was a second cousin of Wilhelm II, German Emperor.

During his youth, he spent time in Berlin, also at his grandmother's Reinhartshausen Castle in Erbach and in Brunswick, where his father served as regent. A few years later he studied law at the University of Bonn, where he received the degree of Doctor of Philosophy. His main interests were in literature and music.

== Political career ==
After marriage, the Prince lived with his wife in Rudy. In 1912, was elected Landrat of Frankenstein District, where he remained until the abolition of the German monarchy and the establishment of the Weimar Republic. Previously, he participated actively in hostilities during the First World War, for which he was promoted to the rank of major general. Much of the time he traveled through Europe and the world, sometimes in important diplomatic missions, representing Emperor Wilhelm II. Sensing the fall of the monarchy in Germany, at the end of the war, he took up for discussion and exchange views with university professors on the reconstruction of the existing system of government, proposing the introduction of a constitutional monarchy modeled on the form of government of the United Kingdom.

In 1918, he was considered for the office of the King of Finland. However, his wife's Catholicism prevented this, and the Finns chose Prince Frederick Charles of Hesse (who was Lutheran as was his wife) instead.

After the war and the establishment of the republic in Germany, Friedrich Wilhelm became involved with the monarchists, proposing the restoration of the German Empire. He was determined to take over the role of regent until the heir to the throne reached the age of maturity. He died in 1925, aged 44 in Weisser Hirsch, a residential district in Dresden.

== Marriage and issue ==
Friedrich Wilhelm married 8 June 1910 at Potsdam to Princess Agathe Charlotte Pauline Marie of Hohenlohe-Schillingsfürst (1888–1960), daughter of Victor II, Duke of Ratibor, and his wife, Countess Marie Breuner-Enckevoirt.

They had four daughters:

- Princess Marie Therese of Prussia (2 May 1911– 3 January 2005), married in 1932 to Aloys Rudolph Hug, had issue.
- Princess Luise Henriette of Prussia (21 July 1912 – 12 October 1973), married in 1936 to Wilhelm Schmalz, had issue.
- Princess Marianne of Prussia (23 August 1913 – 1 March 1983), married in 1933 to Prince Wilhelm of Hesse-Philippsthal-Barchfeld, had issue.
- Princess Elisabeth of Prussia (9 February 1919 – 24 August 1961), married in 1948 to Heinz Mees, no issue.

== Honours and awards ==
He received the following decorations:

- Kingdom of Prussia:
  - Knight of the Black Eagle, 12 July 1890; with Collar, 17 January 1899
  - Knight of the Prussian Crown, 1st Class, 12 July 1890
  - Grand Commander's Cross of the Royal House Order of Hohenzollern, 12 July 1890
  - Grand Cross of the Red Eagle, with Crown, 12 June 1892
  - Iron Cross (1914), 2nd Class
  - Merit Cross for War Aid
- (Hohenzollern-Sigmaringen) Hohenzollern: Cross of Honour of the Princely House Order of Hohenzollern, 1st Class
- Duchy of Anhalt: Grand Cross of Albert the Bear
- Baden: Knight of the House Order of Fidelity, 1905
- Brunswick: Grand Cross of Henry the Lion
- (Saxe-Coburg and Gotha) (Duchy of Saxe-Altenburg) (Saxe-Meiningen) Ernestine duchies: Grand Cross of the Saxe-Ernestine House Order
- Lippe-Detmold: Cross of Honour of the House Order of Lippe, 1st Class with Golden Crown
- Mecklenburg: Grand Cross of the Wendish Crown, with Crown in Ore
- Reuss: Cross of Honour with Crown
- Saxe-Weimar-Eisenach: Grand Cross of the White Falcon
- Schaumburg-Lippe: Cross of Honour of the House Order of Schaumburg-Lippe, 1st Class

== Ancestry ==
Ancestors of Prince Friedrich Wilhelm of Prussia

16. Frederick William II of Prussia
8. Frederick William III of Prussia
17. Princess Frederica Louisa of Hesse-Darmstadt
4. Prince Albert of Prussia
18. Charles II, Grand Duke of Mecklenburg-Strelitz
9. Duchess Louise of Mecklenburg-Strelitz
19. Princess Friederike of Hesse-Darmstadt
2. Prince Albert of Prussia
20. William V, Prince of Orange
10. William I of the Netherlands
21. Princess Wilhelmina of Prussia
5. Princess Marianne of the Netherlands
22. Frederick William II of Prussia (= 16)
11. Princess Wilhelmine of Prussia
23. Princess Frederica Louisa of Hesse-Darmstadt (= 17)
1. Prince Friedrich Wilhelm of Prussia
24. Frederick, Duke of Saxe-Altenburg
12. Georg, Duke of Saxe-Altenburg
25. Duchess Charlotte Georgine of Mecklenburg-Strelitz
6. Ernst I, Duke of Saxe-Altenburg
26. Frederick Louis, Hereditary Grand Duke of Mecklenburg-Schwerin
13. Duchess Marie Louise of Mecklenburg-Schwerin
27. Grand Duchess Elena Pavlovna of Russia
3. Princess Marie of Saxe-Altenburg
28. Frederick, Hereditary Prince of Anhalt-Dessau
14. Leopold IV, Duke of Anhalt
29. Princess Amalie of Hesse-Homburg
7. Princess Agnes of Anhalt-Dessau
30. Prince Louis Charles of Prussia
15. Princess Frederica Wilhelmina of Prussia
31. Duchess Frederica of Mecklenburg-Strelitz

== Notes and sources ==
- L'Allemagne dynastique, Huberty, Giraud, Magdelaine, Reference: vol V page 242
- The Royal House of Stuart, London, 1969, 1971, 1976, Addington, A. C., Reference: page 298.
