= Princess Marie of Saxe-Altenburg (1854–1898) =

Princess Albert of Prussia

Princess Marie
- Princess Albert of Prussia
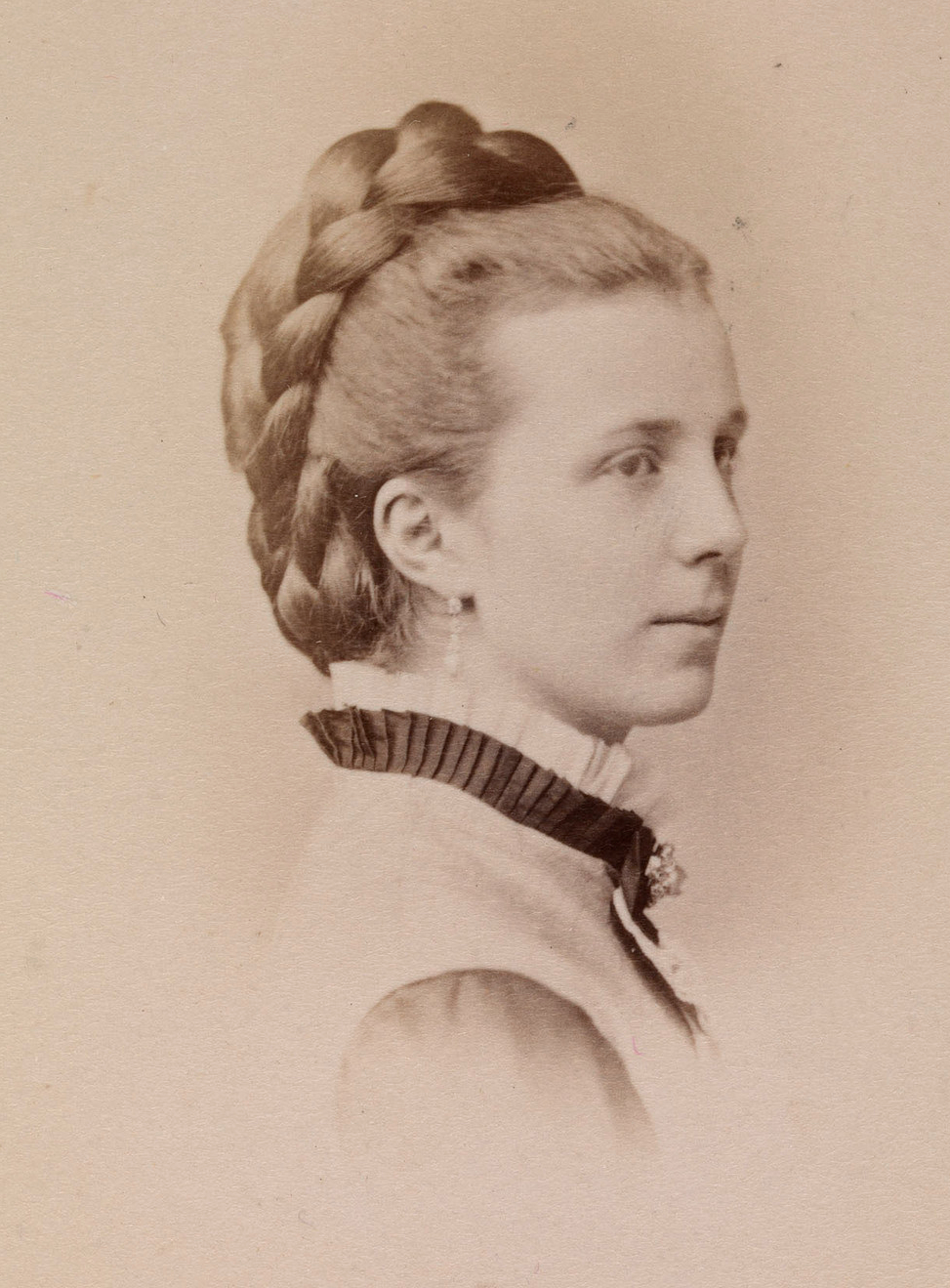
- Princess Marie in 1877
- Born: 2 August 1854; Eisenberg
- Died: 8 October 1898 (aged 44); Kamenz Castle
- Spouse: Prince Albert of Prussia (m. 1873)
- Issue: Prince Friedrich Heinrich; Prince Joachim Albert; Prince Friedrich Wilhelm
Names
- Marie Friederike Leopoldine Georgine Auguste Alexandra Elisabeth Therese Josephine Helene Sophie
- House: Saxe-Altenburg
- Father: Ernst I, Duke of Saxe-Altenburg
- Mother: Princess Agnes of Anhalt-Dessau

Princess Marie of Saxe-Altenburg (Marie Friederike Leopoldine Georgine Auguste Alexandra Elisabeth Therese Josephine Helene Sophie; 2 August 1854 – 8 October 1898) was the wife of Prince Albert of Prussia, Regent for the duchy of Brunswick.

== Family ==
Marie was the only surviving child of Ernst I, Duke of Saxe-Altenburg and his wife Princess Agnes of Anhalt-Dessau, as her younger brother Georg died as an infant. Because her father had no surviving sons to inherit his title, he was succeeded by Marie's cousin Ernst.

== Marriage and issue ==
Marie arrived at Potsdam on the evening of 18 April 1873, where she was received by Prince Albert of Prussia, her fiance. The couple drove to Bellevue Castle, where they were received by the Emperor and Empress.

On 9 April in Berlin, Marie married Prince Albert, grandson of Frederick William III of Prussia. Other reports have them being married on 19 April. Albert's parents had been unhappily married to each other and later divorced; as he chose to wait before getting married and was 36 at the time of their wedding, this is believed to be the reason he did not marry earlier. Spectators commented that the wedding ceremony was grander than most, with Dragoon Guards opening the procession and the Emperor and Empress in attendance. Marie was described as possessing "girlish beauty, and [a] modest unpretending demeanor" that "at once captivated the hearts of the multitude".

They had three sons:

- Prince Friedrich Heinrich Albrecht (15 April 1874 – 13 November 1940)
- Prince Joachim Albrecht (27 September 1876 – 24 October 1939); married Marie von Blich-Sulzer and Karoline Kornelia Stockhammer
- Prince Friedrich Wilhelm (12 July 1880 – 9 March 1925); married Princess Agatha of Hohenlohe-Schillingsfürst

== Later life ==
In 1885, Albert was appointed Regent for the Duchy of Brunswick, replacing Ernest Augustus, Crown Prince of Hanover, who had been removed from office by German Chancellor Otto von Bismarck. Ernest Augustus was also a distant relative of Marie's, as his mother Queen Marie was born a princess of Saxe-Altenburg. After accepting the regency, Albert and Marie resided chiefly in Brunswick, Berlin, and Kamenz.

Princess Marie died on 8 October 1898 at Kamenz Castle. Emperor Wilhelm II and Empress Augusta Victoria attended her funeral, which was held at the castle where she died.

Prince Albert died in 1906. They were buried in the Mausoleum auf dem Hutberge in the park of Schloss Kamenz/Silesia. After World War II, the mausoleum was plundered and they were reburied in the park.

== Ancestry ==
Ancestors of Princess Marie of Saxe-Altenburg (1854–1898)

8. Frederick, Duke of Saxe-Altenburg
4. Georg, Duke of Saxe-Altenburg
9. Duchess Charlotte Georgine of Mecklenburg-Strelitz
2. Ernst I, Duke of Saxe-Altenburg
10. Frederick Louis, Hereditary Grand Duke of Mecklenburg-Schwerin
5. Duchess Marie Louise of Mecklenburg-Schwerin
11. Grand Duchess Elena Pavlovna of Russia
1. Princess Marie of Saxe-Altenburg
12. Frederick, Hereditary Prince of Anhalt-Dessau
6. Leopold IV, Duke of Anhalt
13. Landgravine Amalie of Hesse-Homburg
3. Princess Agnes of Anhalt-Dessau
14. Prince Louis Charles of Prussia
7. Princess Frederica Wilhelmina of Prussia
15. Duchess Frederica of Mecklenburg-Strelitz
