= USS Moccasin (ID-1322) =

German-built cargo liner

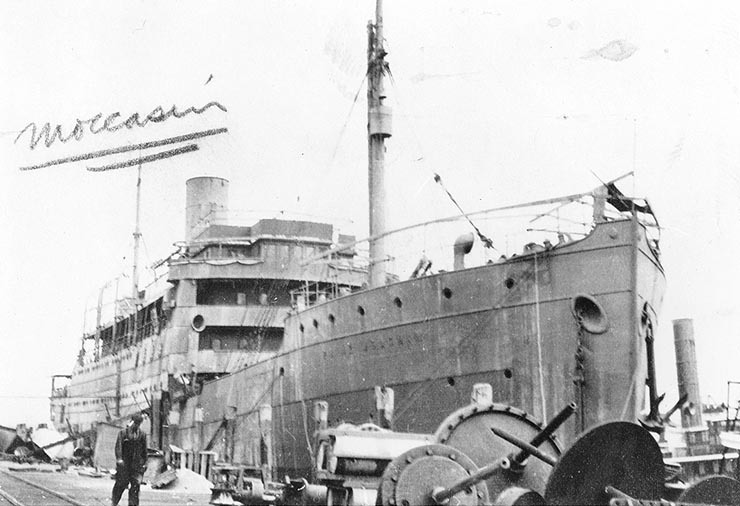
- The ship at an unknown date, with "Prinz Joachim" faintly legible on her starboard bow

History
- Name: 1903: Prinz Joachim; 1917: Moccasin; 1920: Porto Rico
- Namesake: 1903: Prince Joachim Albert; 1917: moccasin
- Owner: 1903: Hamburg America Line; 1917: US Shipping Board; 1923: NY & Porto Rico SS Lines
- Operator: 1920: Munson Steamship Line
- Port of registry: 1903: (German Empire) Hamburg; 1919: (United States) New York
- Route: 1903: Hamburg – Mexico; 1906: New York – Caribbean
- Builder: Flensburger Schiffbau, Flensburg
- Yard number: 218
- Launched: 21 March 1903
- Completed: 4 October 1903
- Commissioned: into US Navy, 26 February 1918
- Decommissioned: from US Navy, 2 June 1919
- Identification: 1903: code letters RNBJ; by 1913: call sign DSP; 1918: Naval Registry ID-1365; US official number 215812; by 1920: code letters LJGW
- Fate: scrapped 1933–34

General characteristics
- Class & type: Prinz-class cargo liner
- Tonnage: 4,760 GRT, 2,981 NRT, 4,704 DWT
- Displacement: 9,060 tons
- Length: 370.8 ft (113.0 m)
- Beam: 45.2 ft (13.8 m)
- Draft: 1 ft 0 in (0.3 m)
- Depth: 25.2 ft (7.7 m)
- Decks: 2
- Installed power: 381 NHP
- Propulsion: 1 × quadruple-expansion engine; 1 × screw
- Speed: 12 knots (22 km/h)
- Capacity: by 1912: 92,865 cu ft (2,630 m^{3}) refrigerated holds
- Complement: 174
- Armament: 1 × 6-inch/50-caliber gun; 1 × 3-inch/50-caliber gun

USS Moccasin (ID-1322) was a cargo liner that was launched in Germany in 1903 as Prinz Joachim. The US seized her in 1917. In 1918–19, she was renamed Moccasin and briefly served in the United States Navy. In 1920, she was returned to US merchant service and renamed Porto Rico. She was scrapped in 1933 or 1934.

As Prinz Joachim, the ship took relief to Jamaica after the 1907 Kingston earthquake, and she contributed to relief after the 1910 Costa Rica earthquakes. She survived running aground off Jamaica in 1910 and in the Bahamas in 1911.

== Prinz-class ocean liners ==
Between 1901 and 1903, HAPAG had seven new cargo liners built, each named after a prince of the House of Hohenzollern. Five of them were single-screw, all built to the same dimensions, and formed a class. Reiherstieg Schiffswerfte & Maschinenfabrik in Hamburg built Prinz Eitel Friedrich and Prinz Waldemar. AG "Neptun" in Rostock built Prinz Sigismund. Flensburger Schiffbau-Gesellschaft in Flensburg built Prinz August Wilhelm and Prinz Joachim.

At the same time, Bremer Vulkan Schiffbau & Machinenfabrik in Bremen-Vegesack built Prinz Adalbert and Prinz Oskar. These were about 32 feet (10 m) longer and 4 feet (1.2 m) broader than the other five, and were twin-screw ships. They thus form either a sub-class or a separate class.

== Building ==
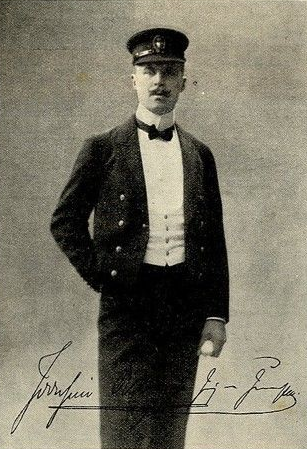
Prince Joachim Albert of Prussia in 1906

Flensburger Schiffbau built Prinz August Wilhelm and Prinz Joachim as yard numbers 217 and 218. They were almost identical. Prinz Joachim was launched on 21 March 1903 and completed on 4 October. She was named after Prince Joachim Albert of Prussia. Her registered length was 370.8 ft (113.0 m), her beam was 45.2 ft (13.8 m), her depth was 25.2 ft (7.7 m) and her draft was 1 ft 0 in (0.3 m). Her tonnages were 4,760 GRT, 2,981 NRT, and 9,060 tons displacement.

A quadruple-expansion engine drove Prinz Joachim's single screw. It was rated at 381 NHP and gave her a speed of 12 knots (22 km/h).

== Peacetime HAPAG service ==
HAPAG registered Prinz Joachim at Hamburg. Her code letters were RNBJ. In October 1903, she joined her sister ship Prinz August Wilhelm on HAPAG's route between Hamburg and Mexico.

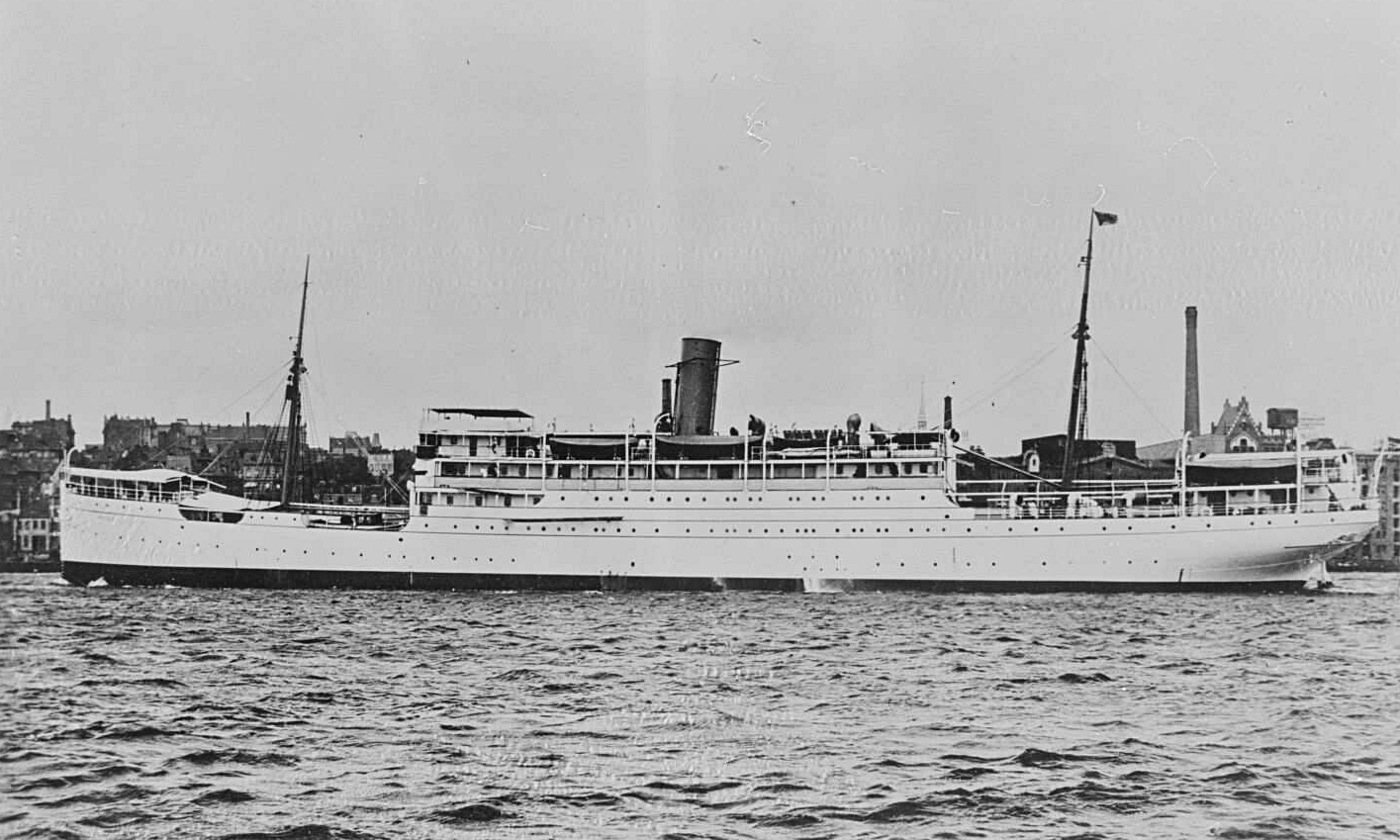
Prinz Joachim with her hull painted white for cruising

In September 1905, the Royal Mail Steam Packet Company (RMSP) announced that it would start running a fast passenger service between New York and Jamaica. HAPAG responded by announcing that it would put Prinz August Wilhelm and Prinz Joachim on its Atlas Service, which ran various routes between New York and the Caribbean. In June 1906, HAPAG announced that it would transfer its cruise ship Prinzessin Victoria Luise to the New York – Jamaica route, and that Prinz Eitel Friedrich, Prince Waldemar, Prinz August Wilhelm, and Prinz Joachim would all work the route between New York and Colón via Kingston.

On 14 January 1907, an earthquake struck Kingston. New Yorkers formed a relief committee, which had Prinz Joachim loaded with relief supplies including food including barrels of beef, flour, and lard. She was to sail on 19 January, but fog delayed her until the next day.

On 5 June 1907, Prinz Joachim reached New York from Central America carrying passengers including former President of Honduras Marco Aurelio Soto, and the US explorers Hiram Bingham III and Alexander H. Rice Jr.

On 4 November 1909, just after Prinz Joachim docked in New York, the Purser's personal steward let himself into the Purser's office, unlocked the safe, stole $8,065 in US currency that passengers had entrusted to the Purser, and then absconded from the ship. It was the first such theft from a ship in New York for 25 years.

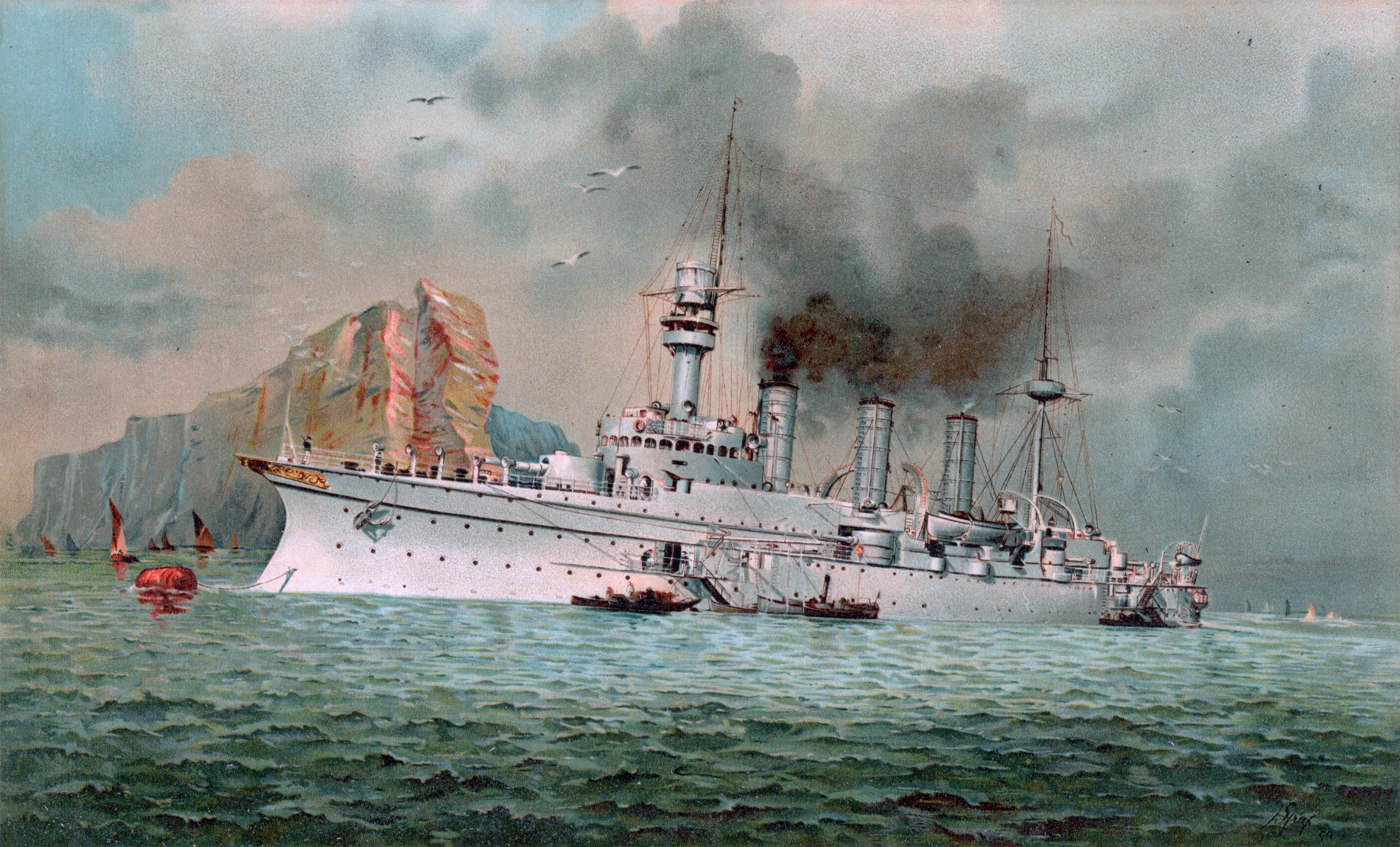
The cruiser SMS Hertha

On 9 January 1910, Prinz Joachim was leaving Kingston for Colón when she ran aground on soft mud. The German cruiser SMS Hertha went to her assistance. The next day, both her sister ship Prinz Eitel Friedrich and Hertha tried to pull her free, without success. However, by 11 January, she had been refloated, undamaged, and resumed her voyage to Colón.

In April and May 1910, a series of earthquakes destroyed the city of Cartago, Costa Rica. Prinz Joachim was in Puerto Limón at the time, and contributed her ship's doctor and five of her stewards to a relief expedition that was sent by train to Cartago. The five stewards were all former Imperial German Army nurses.

By 1910, Prinz Joachim was equipped with wireless telegraphy. By 1913, her call sign was DSP. In the fall of 1910, Prinz Joachim made a 51-day Caribbean cruise. She used her wireless to report her progress to HAPAG's New York office. The cruise included a visit to Colón, which coincided with President Taft visiting Colón aboard a United States Navy squadron. Prinz Joachim displayed an illuminated sign of more than 2,000 electric lights saying "Welcome Taft".

=== Aground off Samana Cay ===
On Saturday 18 November 1911, Prinz Joachim left New York for Kingston. The former Congressman William Jennings Bryan and some of his family were among her passengers. At 03:40 hrs on 22 November, she grounded on rocks off Samana Cay in the Bahamas. Prinz Joachim sent wireless signals calling for help, but received no answer for "several hours", because not all ships carried wireless equipment, and not all those that did carry it had enough wireless operators to man their receivers 24 hours a day.

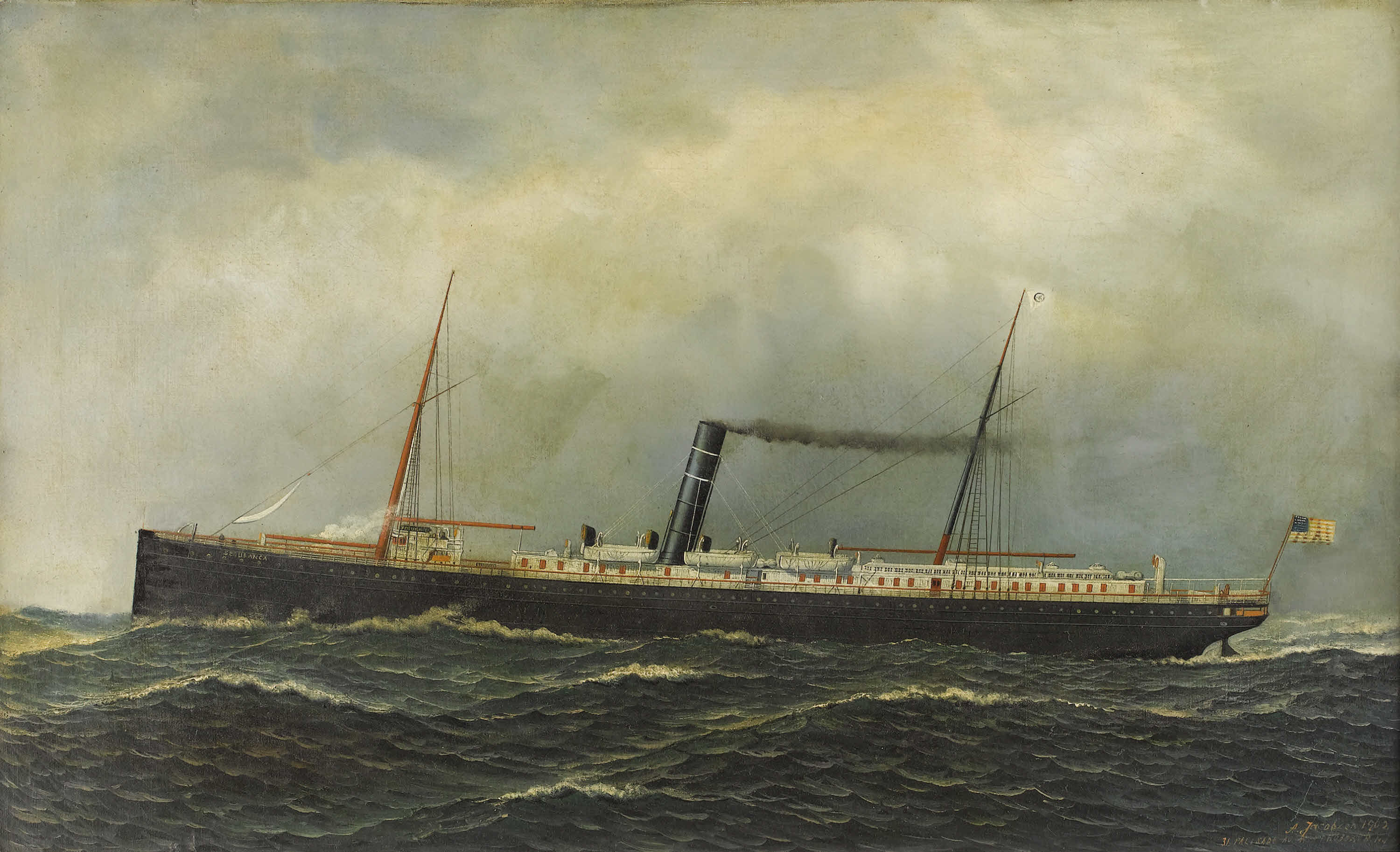
A painting by Antonio Jacobsen of the Ward Line steamship Seguranca

The Ward Line steamship Seguranca was the first ship to arrive to help. She took off all 84 of Prinz Joachim's passengers, plus some of her mail.

A number of boats transferred passengers between the two ships. At the end of the operation, a high sea drove one of Prinz Joachim's boats off course, and prevented it from returning to the ship. It had 18 crew, commanded by her second officer. The Norwegian steamship Fritzoa rescued the second officer and his crew, and landed them at Felton, Mayarí, Cuba.

Seguranca took the passengers to Nassau, Bahamas, where all but eight of them were transferred to the Ward Line steamship Vigilancia. WJ Bryan praised Prinz Joachim's Master, Captain Fey, but recommended that every ship that had wireless should carry two wireless operators, so that one or other might always be on watch. USS Peoria took off the remainder of Prinz Joachim's mail, and the steamship Admiral Schley took off those of her stewards who were no longer needed as she no longer had any passengers.

Prinz Joachim's remaining crew started to jettison some of her cargo to lighten her. By then, many wreckers had arrived, hoping to salvage anything of value from the ship. One of the jettisoned items was a wooden box containing explosives. Six wreckers from Florida, in three boats, struggled with each other to take the box from the water. The explosives detonated, destroying all three boats and killing all six people. Prinz Joachim was eventually refloated.

=== Costa Rican bananas ===
HAPAG had a contract with the United Fruit Company to ship bananas from Costa Rica until the end of 1911, when United Fruit chose not renew it. The Atlantic Fruit Company then contracted HAPAG to ship fruit from Costa Rica, with Prinz Joachim due to leave Puerto Limón with the fist shipment on 12 June 1912. The Lindo brothers of Jamaica, who were to supply Atlantic Fruit from their Costa Rica banana plantations, withdrew from the partnership, but a month later Prinz Joachim was still maintaining the service.

For the season from September 1912 to January 1913, HAPAG advertised Prinz Joachim making round trips from New York to Fortune Island (now Long Cay), Santiago, Kingston, Colón, and Puerto Limón.

As built, Prinz Joachim's holds included 3,130 cubic feet (89 m^{3}) of refrigerated space, with J & E Hall refrigerating machinery. However, by 1912, the American Linde Refrigerating Co had increased her refrigerated capacity to 92,865 cubic feet (2,630 m^{3}), and installed the same aboard her sister ship Prinz August Wilhelm.

== Laid up in New York ==
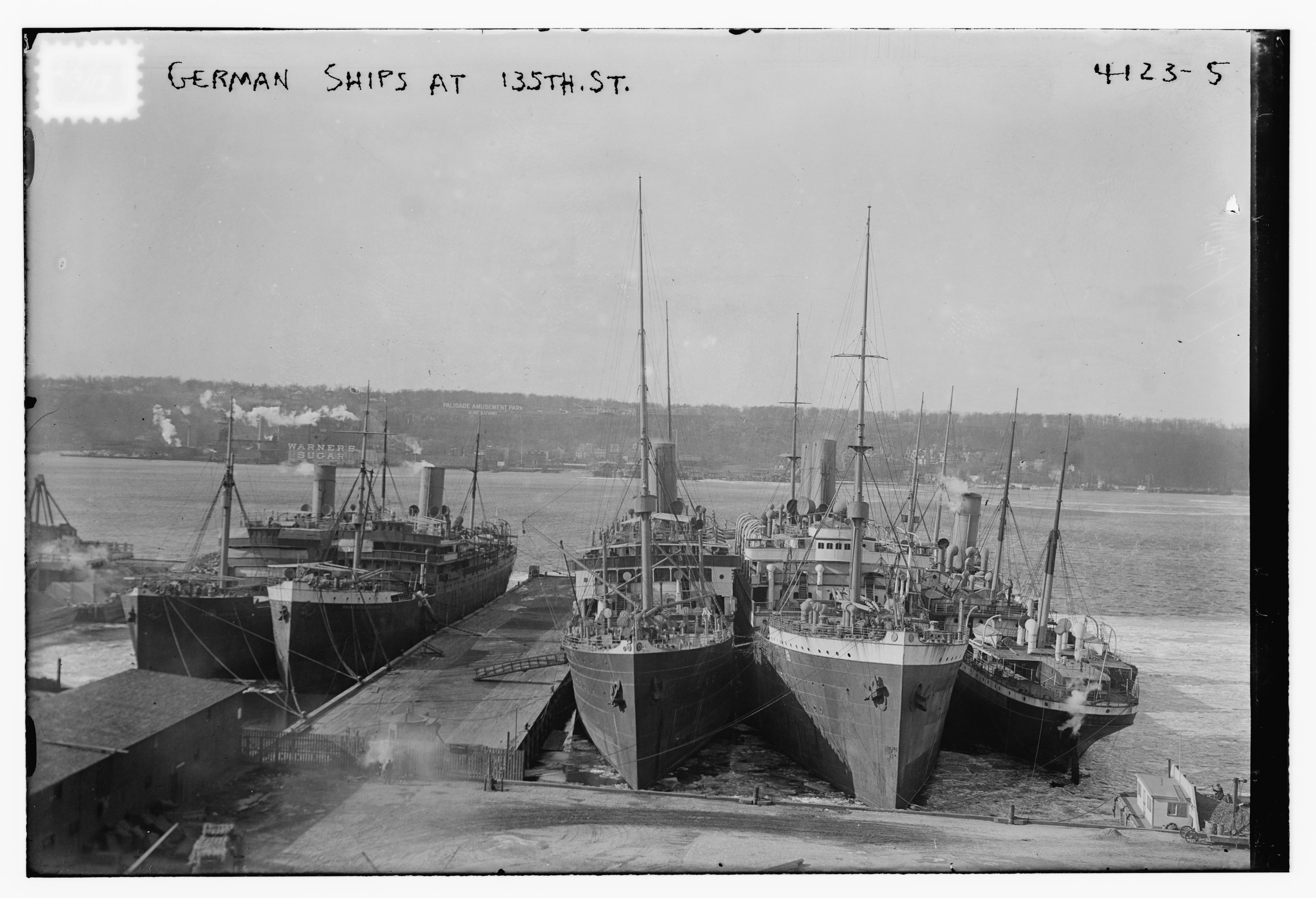
HAPAG ships in New York in 1915. Prinz Joachim is on the left, alongside her sister ship Prinz Eitel Friedrich. Centre right are König Wilhelm II and Hamburg. On the right is Allemannia.

On 1 August 1914, Prinz Joachim was due to leave New York for the Caribbean. However, at 11:00 hrs that morning, with the First World War imminent, HAPAG announced the suspension of its Atlas Service. Prinz Joachim's passengers were transferred to RMSP's Orotava and United Fruit's Pastores.

By 7 August 1914, HAPAG ships were sheltering in US ports. The company considered selling them to US interests, so that they could return to service registered in the then-neutral USA. HAPAG also offered to loan Prinz Joachim to the American Red Cross for up to two months, on a non-profit basis, for $1,100 a day.

On 7 May 1915, a U-boat sank RMS Lusitania off the coast of Ireland. The 1,199 people killed included 128 US citizens. The US government anticipated that if it went to war with the Central Powers, merchant crews of those countries might sabotage their ships to prevent the USA seizing them. On 12 May, therefore, 70 United States Customs Service inspectors searched German and Austro-Hungarian ships in the Port of New York and New Jersey for explosives. But the USA did not intern Central Powers ships in US ports. By April 1916, they were still free to leave if they wished.

However, on the night of 31 January to 1 February 1917, the Collector of the Port of New York put a police guard on all Central Powers ships in his port. Prinz Joachim was moored with Prinz Eitel Friedrich, König Wilhelm II, Hamburg, and Allemannia. 20 officers arrived overnight to guard them. On 3 February, the Navy Secretary ordered the seizure of all Central Powers ships in US ports.

== US transatlantic service ==
On 6 April, the US declared war on the Central Powers. On 30 June, President Woodrow Wilson authorised the United States Shipping Board (USSB) to assume ownership of 87 German ships in US-controlled ports. However, by then the USSB had already had many of the ships repaired and put into service, without awaiting Presidential authority. By 30 December, Prinz Joachim had been repaired, and the USSB had renamed her Moccasin. Late in 1917, the United States Army chartered her.

On 26 February 1918, the US Navy commissioned her as USS Moccasin, with the Naval Registry ID-1365. She was defensively armed with one 6-inch/50-caliber gun and one 3-inch/50-caliber gun. She was assigned to the Naval Overseas Transportation Service. She loaded frozen food, and, on 14 March 1918, left New York with a convoy to Europe. She reached Bordeaux, France on 13 April. She continued to carry frozen food from New York to Europe until 1919.

Moccasin also repatriated small groups of US troops. Late on 31 December 1918, she reached Gravesend Bay from Brest, France, carrying explosives and troops. 47 officers and seven enlisted men transferred from her to a tugboat that landed them at Hoboken, New Jersey. On 26 February, Moccasin left Brest again. She reached New York on 20 March carrying 33 casuals. On 24 April, she left Bordeaux, reaching New York on 8 May.

== US Latin American services ==
On 2 June 1919, Moccasin was decommissioned and returned to the USSB. By then, she was registered in New York, and her code letters were LJGW. On 15 August 1919, the USSB invited bids to repair her and convert her to burn oil fuel. Tietjen & Lang Dry Dock Company won the contract with a bid of $390,000. The USSB appointed the Munson Steamship Line to manage her as one of six ships on a cargo and first class passenger service to and from the east coast of South America, also serving the Caribbean and Central America.

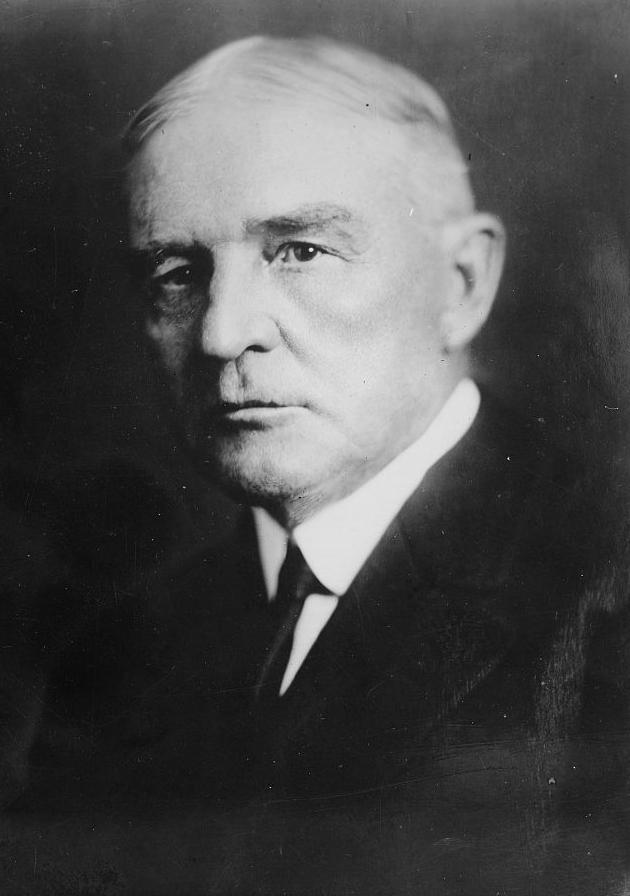
USSB Chairman John Barton Payne

On 27 December 1919, Moccasin was due to leave New York on her first voyage on the new service. This was only three weeks before Prohibition in the United States was due to be implemented. The USSB's lawyers claimed that the new law would not apply to USSB ships once they were outside the 3-nautical-mile (6 km) limit of the USA's territorial waters. However, the USSB Chairman, John Barton Payne, ordered that liquor would not be sold on its ships. This cast doubt on whether the new service could compete against ships registered in other countries, which did not have prohibition. The USSB therefore considered selling the ships instead. By the time Moccasin left New York, 14 passengers had cancelled, and only 36 embarked. She also carried 7,000 tons of general cargo.

Moccasin called at Saint Thomas, U.S. Virgin Islands and Rio de Janeiro, and reached Buenos Aires on 26 January, 25 days after leaving New York. Argentinian newspapers praised her passenger accommodation, but commented on how small she was, and that she looked "unpainted". She left Buenos Aires on 1 February. However, before Moccasin had reached her destination, the USSB announced that it was considering transferring her to the New York and Porto Rico Line service to Puerto Rico. Payne admitted to the Congressional Commerce Committee that the liquor ban compromised the viability of the new service to South America.

Shortly after her return to New York, Moccasin partly sank at her berth in the Erie Basin at Red Hook, Brooklyn. The USSB began an investigation on 3 March 1920. This was one of a series of mishaps that befell ships that the US had seized from Germany. The USSB claimed that there was no evidence of sabotage, despite a rumour that her seacocks had been opened. After the accident, she was reconditioned at Brooklyn Navy Yard.

By June 1920, the USSB had renamed the ship Porto Rico, and appointed the Porto Rico Steamship Company to run her to and from Puerto Rico. By 1923, the New York & Porto Rico Steam Ship Lines owned the ship. She was scrapped in 1933 or 1934.

== Bibliography ==
- Fourth Annual Report of the United States Shipping Board (PDF) (Report). Washington, DC: Government Printing Office. 1 December 1920.
- Haws, Duncan (1980). The Ships of the Hamburg America, Adler and Carr Lines. Merchant Fleets in Profile. Vol. 4. Cambridge: Patrick Stephens Ltd. ISBN 0-85059-397-2.
- Kludas, Arnold (1996). Die Geschichte der deutschen Passagierschiffahrt 1850 bis 1990 (in German). Vol. II. Augsburg: Weltbild. ISBN 3-89350-821-X.
- Lloyd's Register of British and Foreign Shipping. Vol. I.–Steamers. London: Lloyd's Register of Shipping. 1904 – via Internet Archive.
- Lloyd's Register of British and Foreign Shipping. Vol. I.–Steamers. London: Lloyd's Register of Shipping. 1910 – via Internet Archive.
- Lloyd's Register of British and Foreign Shipping. Vol. I.–Sailing Vessels, &c. London: Lloyd's Register of Shipping. 1912 – via Internet Archive.
- Lloyd's Register of Shipping. Vol. II.–Steamers. London: Lloyd's Register of Shipping. 1919 – via Internet Archive.
- Lloyd's Register of Shipping. Vol. II.–Steamers. London: Lloyd's Register of Shipping. 1920 – via Internet Archive.
- Lloyd's Register of Shipping. Vol. II.–Steamers and Motor Vessels. London: Lloyd's Register of Shipping. 1923 – via Internet Archive.
- Lloyd's Register of Shipping (PDF). Vol. II.–Steamers and Motorships of 300 tons gross & over. London: Lloyd's Register of Shipping. 1933 – via Southampton City Council.
- The Marconi Press Agency Ltd (1913). The Year Book of Wireless Telegraphy and Telephony. London: The St Katherine Press.
