= Grand Duchess Alexandra Pavlovna of Russia =

Grand Duchess of Russia

Grand Duchess Alexandra Pavlovna
- Archduchess of Austria; Palatina of Hungary
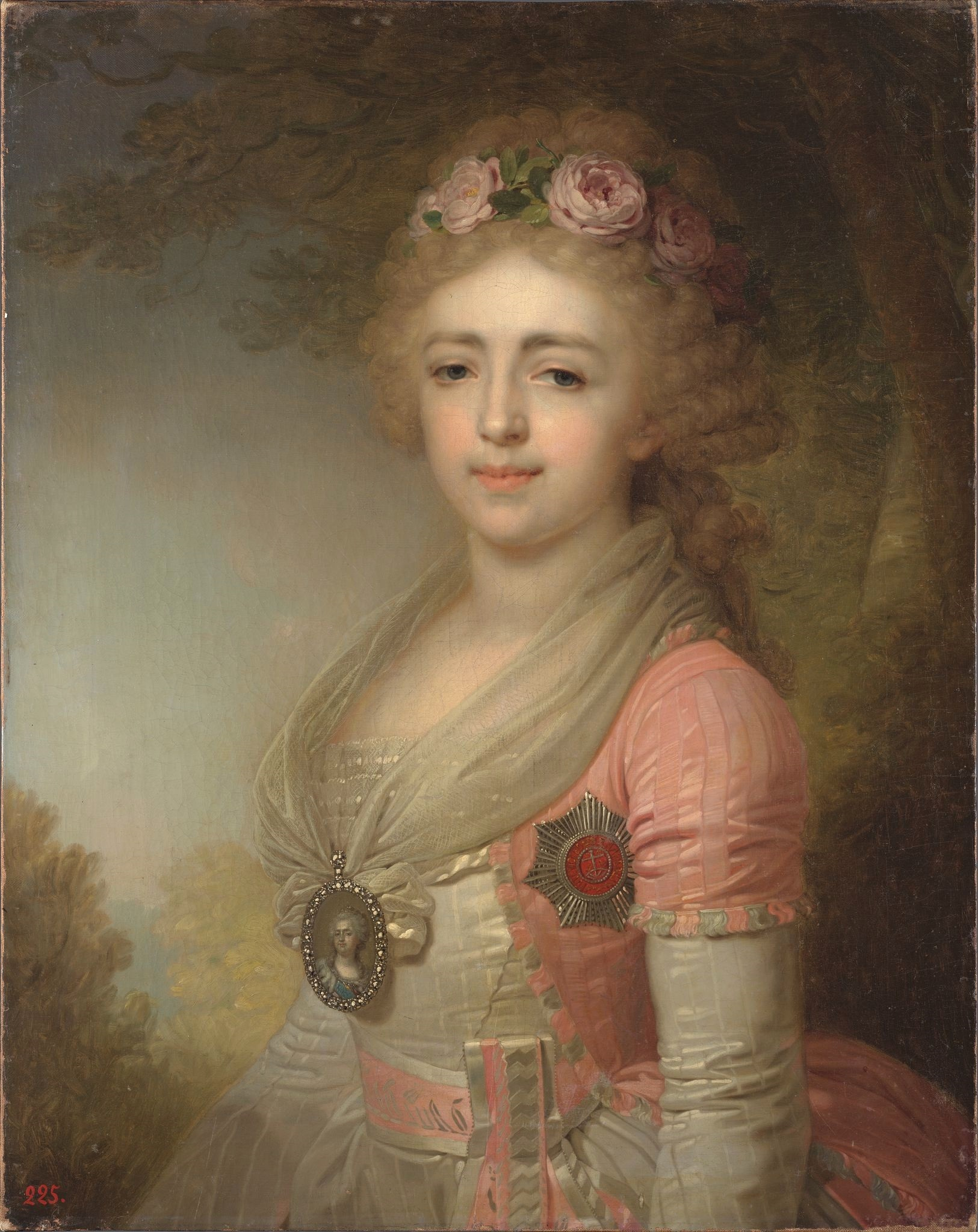
- Portrait c. 1795–1799
- Born: 9 August 1783; Catherine Palace, Tsarskoye Selo, Russian Empire
- Died: 16 March 1801 (aged 17); Buda, Kingdom of Hungary
- Spouse: Archduke Joseph, Palatine of Hungary (m. 1799)
- Issue: Archduchess Alexandrina Paulina
- House: Holstein-Gottorp-Romanov
- Father: Paul I of Russia
- Mother: Sophie Dorothea of Württemberg

Grand Duchess Alexandra Pavlovna of Russia (Russian: Александра Павловна: 9 August [O.S. 29 July] 1783 – 16 March [O.S. 4 March] 1801) was a daughter of Emperor Paul I of Russia and sister of emperors Alexander I and Nicholas I. She married Archduke Joseph, Palatine of Hungary. Her marriage was the only Romanov-Habsburg marital alliance to date.

== Birth ==
Grand Duchess Alexandra Pavlovna was born in Tsarskoye Selo as the third child and eldest daughter of Tsesarevich Paul and his second wife Sophie Dorothea of Württemberg (renamed Maria Feodorovna after her wedding). The gender of the child disappointed her paternal grandmother, Catherine the Great. She wrote:

A third child was born and was a girl, which was named Alexandra in honor of her older brother. To tell the truth, I infinitely more like boys than girls.

The Empress' secretary Alexander Khrapovitsky wrote that the Empress considered the newborn Grand Duchess Alexandra very ugly, especially compared with her older brothers. The comparison with her younger sister Elena, was also unfavorable to her: the Empress noted that the six-month-old Elena was much smarter and more charming than the two-year Alexandra. However, as a gift for the birth of Alexandra, Catherine II gave her son Gatchina Palace.

Gradually the Empress started to have better feelings about her granddaughter. On 12 March 1787, she wrote to her:

Alexandra Pavlovna, I'm always pleased that you're clever, don't cry and was always funny; you're smart, and I'm happy with that. Thank you, that you love me, I'll love you.

In turn, Alexandra was particularly attached to her grandmother. Catherine II noted:

She loves me more than anyone in the world, and I think she's ready for anything just to please me, or at least for had my attention even for a moment.

== Education ==
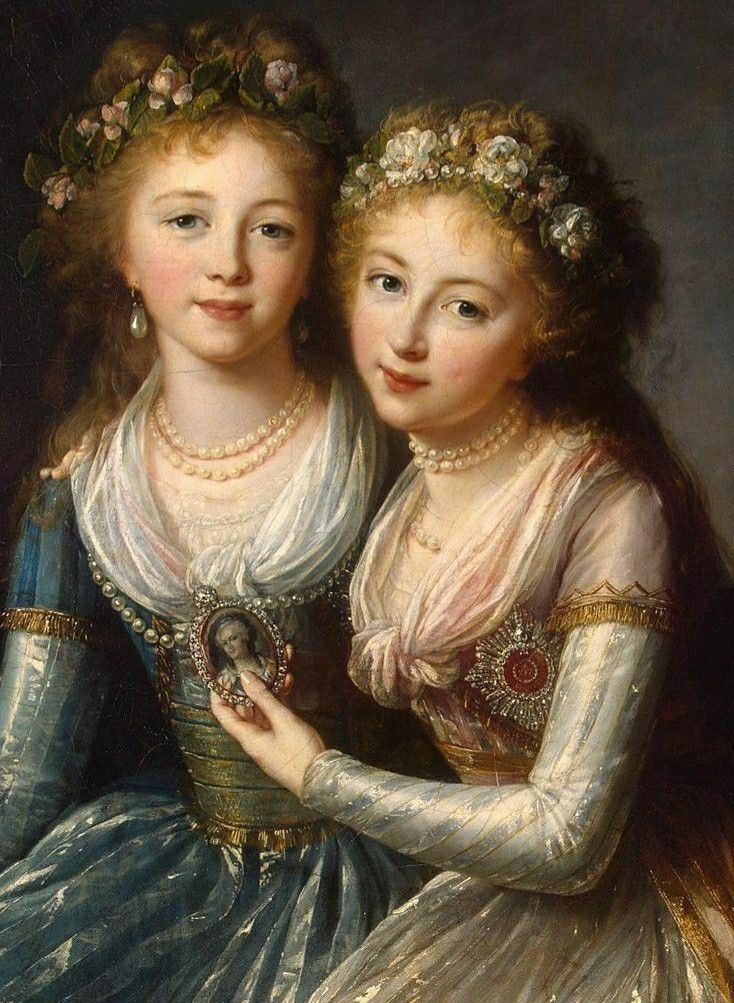
Grand Duchesses Alexandra and Elena Pavlovna, by Elisabeth Vigée Le Brun, c. 1795–1797.

She received the usual education of Russian princesses and was taught French and German as well as music and drawing. Alexandra was very close to her younger sister Elena, and they were often painted together.

Alexandra's upbringing, as well as her sister's, was entrusted to Charlotte von Lieven, who acted as governess.

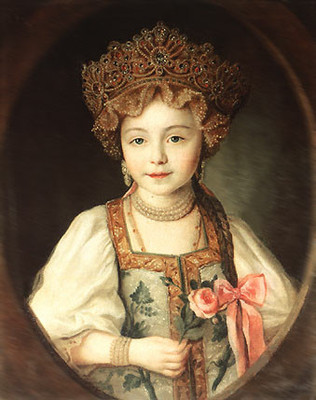
A little Grand Duchess Alexandra Pavlovna dressed in kokoshnik and sarafan, 1790s.

The older Grand Duchess was a very diligent student. In 1787, her mother proudly wrote about her four-year-old daughter, that "she continues to be diligent, making notable advances and begins to translate from German". Alexandra was fascinated by drawing and "I think she has a great talent in this art", and the music and singing, and "in these arts has found remarkable abilities".

In 1790, in her letter to the Baron von Grimm, Catherine II gave a description of her granddaughter:

The third is a portrait of Grand Duchess Alexandra. During her first six years of life, I didn't find any special on her, but since a year and a half ago, suddenly she made a surprising change: she became more prettier and took a posture that seems older than her years. She speaks four languages, had a good writing and drawing, playing with the harpsichord, singing, dancing, learning easily and show a great gentleness of character.

== Gustav IV ==
In 1794, the Empress began to think about the future of the Grand Duchess. Alexandra Pavlovna was eleven years old, and "that summer a girl should be considered an adult." In the letters of those years Catherine II expresses the idea of bringing to Russia "landless princes", who after marrying her granddaughters would get the position and means for life in their new homeland.

It is time for the older one to get married. She and the other sister, beautiful. They are all good, and all find them charming. Bridegrooms will have to look for them in the afternoon with fire. Ugly we do not need, fools – also; but poverty – not a vice. Well they must have body and soul.

But the fate of Alexandra turned out differently. In 1792, news arrived at the Russian court regarding the murder of King Gustav III of Sweden (who was the Empress' first-cousin) and the accession to the throne of his 14-year-old son Gustav IV Adolf. Reportedly, the desire of the late Swedish monarch was to make an alliance with the Russian Imperial family by marrying his only son to one of the granddaughters of the Empress; however, according to another version, the idea of marriage belonged to the Empress, and even became one of the secret conditions of the Treaty of Värälä. The idea of this alliance was supported by the Swedish regent, the new King's uncle Charles, Duke of Södermanland.

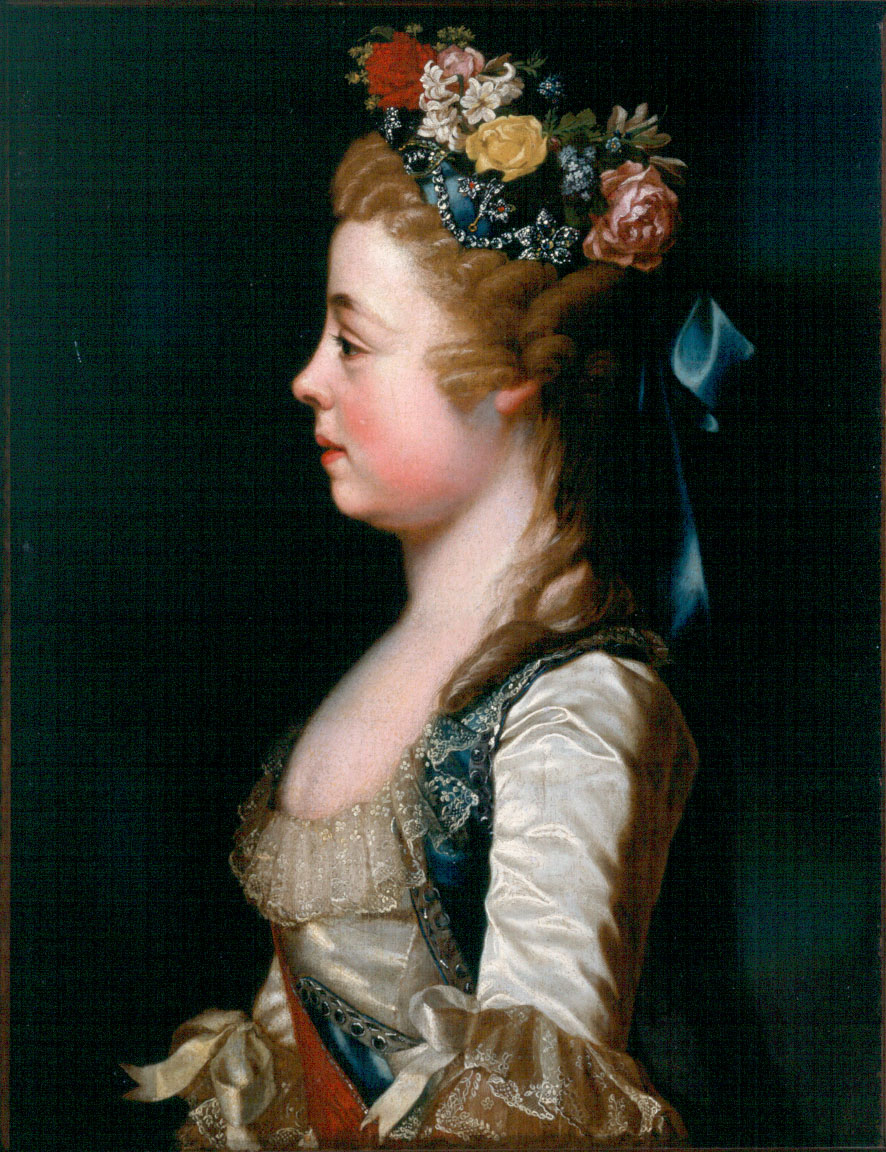
Profile portrait of Grand Duchess Alexandra Pavlovna around the age of eleven, by Dmitry Levitzky

In October 1793, on the occasion of the marriage of the Grand Duke Alexander Pavlovich with Princess Louise of Baden, Count Stenbock arrived in St. Petersburg with congratulations from the Swedish court, and started the official talks about marriage. Alexandra began to learn the Swedish language, as well as to prepare to think about her future husband.

Negotiations went with varying success. In January 1794, Catherine II wrote to her first-cousin, the Duke of Södermanland:

As with politics, and with a family point of view, I always looked up and now look at this alliance as the most desirable in all respects.

But on two issues the parties could not reach an agreement: The religion of the future Queen and the fate of Count Gustaf Mauritz Armfelt, member of the conspiracy against the Swedish regent, who took refuge in Russia. In retaliation, the regent began to negotiate a marriage between Gustav IV Adolf and Duchess Louise Charlotte of Mecklenburg-Schwerin. Pretending to ignore the machinations of the Swedish regent, the Empress wrote in April 1795 to Baron von Grimm:

The girl can wait patiently for my decision of her fate until the adulthood of the King, as she is only eleven years old. If the matter is not settled, it may be comforted, because that will be the loser, who marries another. I can safely say that it is difficult to find an equal to her beauty, talent and kindness, not to mention the dowry, which for a poor Swedish itself is the subject of importance. In addition, this marriage would strengthen the world for many years.

On 1 November 1795 the Swedish court officially announced the engagement between Gustav IV Adolf and Duchess Louise Charlotte of Mecklenburg-Schwerin, and in the official church prayer in Sweden the intended bride began to be mentioned. Catherine II stood to protect her granddaughter:

Let the regent hate me, let him look for an opportunity and deceive me – good luck! – But why does he marry the King with that plain and ugly girl? How did the King deserve such cruel punishment, while he was thinking to marry the Grand Duchess, whose beauty is talked about by everyone with one voice?

But the Empress was not limited to just words: she refused to accept the ambassador who came with the message of the engagement's announcement. Count Alexander Suvorov was sent to the Swedish border for "exploring the castles", and in Stockholm Major General Count Andrei Budberg was instructed to prevent the marriage. While the Swedish court was waiting for the arrival of the bride, the King suddenly changed his mind and broke off the engagement. In April 1796, talks about the "Russian marriage" were resumed by Catherine II, who invited Gustav IV Adolf to visit her in St. Petersburg.

Gustav IV Adolf and his uncle the Duke of Södermanland arrived incognito for a meeting with the bride. A series of brilliant parties were arranged in their honor. The Swedish sovereign and Alexandra fell in love at first sight. The passion of Gustav IV Adolf for the Grand Duchess was evident: he danced with her constantly and had intimate conversations with her.

Everyone notices that His Majesty is only dancing with Alexandra, and that their conversations are not interrupted... I think my girl doesn't feel aversion for the aforementioned young man; she no longer has a confused look and talks freely with her partner.

On 25 August 1796, Gustav IV Adolf asked the Empress for permission to marry the Grand Duchess. The negotiations with Sweden were led by Counts Platon Zubov and Arkady Morkov. However, they were concerned with the question of the faith of the future Queen. The procurator-general Alexander Samoylov wrote:

They said that as honest men they are obliged to announce to me that Sweden's laws require that the Queen profess the same religion of the King.

Only on 2 September Gustav IV Adolf agreed that Alexandra would keep her Eastern Orthodox faith. Four days later, on 6 September, the Swedish embassy formally requested the hand of the Grand Duchess. The groom and the bride's father visited some military maneuvers, and poet Gavrila Derzhavin wrote a "Concert for the engagement of the King of Sweden with Grand Duchess Alexandra Pavlovna". The official engagement was scheduled to take place on 11 September in the Throne Room of the Winter Palace. However, when Counts Zubov and Morkov were to sign the marriage contract in the morning of that day, they found that there was no article about the freedom of religion of the Grand Duchess, which was erased by order of the king. Despite the pleas of the Russian envoys, the King was firm that he would never give his people an Orthodox queen, and locked himself in his room. The Empress, her court and Alexandra, who was dressed as a bride, waited for him for more than four hours. Following the announcement of the final rejection of the king, the Empress had a small attack of apoplexy, and a grief-stricken Alexandra, in tears, locked herself in her room; the Swedish embassy declared that the engagement was canceled due to illness of the King. On 12 September Gustav IV Adolf was present at the ball on the occasion of the birthday of Grand Duchess Anna Feodorovna (born Princess Juliane of Saxe-Coburg-Saalfeld), wife of Grand Duke Konstantin Pavlovich, but he was given a cold reception. Alexandra wasn't present at the ball, and the Empress had spent a little more than 15 minutes there, citing illness. Although the engagement didn't take place, talks about a marriage continued for a while. On 22 September 1796 the Swedish King had left Russia, with the Empress warning her son: "They're just your sons and their wives, but your four daughters should all be ill with colds."

Catherine II died two months later, on 17 November, and the marriage negotiations were continued by Alexandra Pavlovna's father and new Emperor Paul I of Russia. But in spite of all attempts, the main issue, the religion of the Grand Duchess, was not settled, and the marriage negotiations were finally stopped.

Soon, the Imperial family suffered another blow. In October 1797 Gustav IV Adolf married Princess Frederica of Baden, a younger sister of Grand Duchess Elizabeth Alexeievna, Alexandra's sister-in-law. Empress Maria Feodorovna blamed both her daughter-in-law for intriguing in favor of her sister and her husband the Emperor for "allowing himself these sharp and biting antics against her daughter".

== Marriage ==
In 1799, three years after her failed betrothal with the King of Sweden, another marital project originated for Alexandra. Previously in 1798, Dukes Ferdinand Augustus and Alexander Frederick of Württemberg who were the brothers of the Empress Maria Feodorovna, arrived in St. Petersburg to serve in the Imperial Russian Army. They expressed the interest of Austria to join with Russia in a coalition against the rising power of the French Republic and Napoleon, and to cement this alliance, it was decided to arrange a marriage between Alexandra and Archduke Joseph of Austria, Palatine (Governor) of Hungary and younger brother of Francis II, Holy Roman Emperor.

Archduke Joseph personally came to Russia to see his bride. The meeting between them was successful. In mid-February, the betrothal ball was held. Later, a marriage contract was signed in which Alexandra would be allowed to kept her Russian Orthodox faith. In October, Count Fyodor Rostopchin wrote:

Believe me, that's not good started to strengthen the alliance with the Austrian court by ties of blood... Of all the sisters she will be given the least successful marriage. She will have nothing to wait for, and her children even more so.

On 25 September, a decree was published about the royal title of Alexandra. In Russia, she was referred to as "Her Imperial Highness Grand Duchess the Archduchess of Austria" with the French prefix of "Palatine d'Hongrie". The wedding took place on 30 October at Gatchina Palace, one week after the wedding of her sister Elena. To celebrate both events, poet Gavrila Derzhavin wrote the ode "the wedding celebrations of 1799".

On 21 November, the couple went to Austria. Countess Varvara Golovina remembered that Alexandra was sad to leave Russia, and her father Emperor Paul I "constantly repeated, would not see her since her sacrifice."

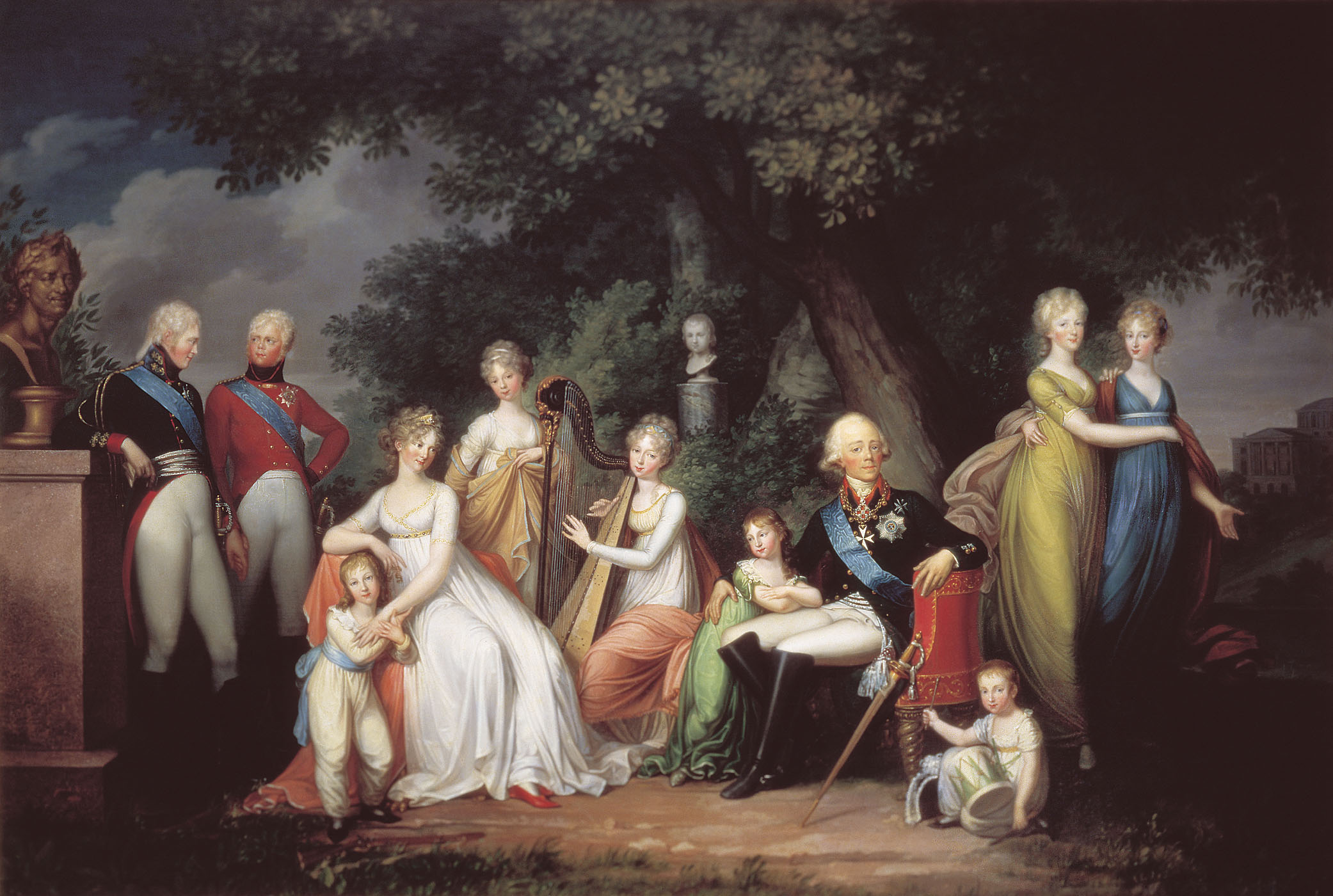
Family portrait of the House of Romanov in 1800, with Grand Duchess Alexandra Pavlovna (by this point Palatina of Hungary) in yellow at the very right, next to her sister Elena Pavlovna, by Gerhard von Kügelgen. Both Alexandra Pavlovna and her father would die the next year.

According to Alexandra's confessor, Andrei Samborski, Alexandra was given a cold reception in Vienna. However, other sources offer a different view. Queen Maria Carolina of Naples (the Emperor's mother-in-law) and her daughters arrived in Vienna in August 1800 for a long stay. Maria Carolina's daughter, Princess Maria Amalia of Naples and Sicily, wrote in her journal that on 15 August the Queen and her daughters were introduced to Alexandra, whom she described as "very beautiful". Maria Amalia and Alexandra became friends during this time; and the Princess of Naples wrote in her journal that the Russian Grand Duchess and her husband had a friendly relationship with the rest of the imperial family and took part in the family gatherings, parties and balls in Vienna, which contrasts with the version given by Andrei Samborski. For instance, in January 1801, Maria Amalia wrote in her journal that the imperial family used to attend balls in Archduke Joseph's residence in Vienna, where "beautiful Alexandra, always serious and sad, has a magnificent household."

When she was presented to Emperor Francis II, she reminded him of his first wife Elisabeth of Württemberg, who was her maternal aunt; this caused the jealousy of Empress Maria Theresa, Francis II's second wife, who was also envious of Alexandra's beauty and fine jewelry. Imperial confessor Andrew Samborski wrote:

Remembering the happy cohabitation with her led him (the Emperor) in extreme confusion of mind which afflicted the heart of the Empress, his present wife. After this, she became in the innocent victim of the Empress' implacable vengeance...The Empress not forgotten and humiliated her parents and siblings when she called them a family of freaks, due to the treatment that Grand Duke Constantine gave to his wife.

Once, Alexandra turned up to a ball beautifully dressed, with magnificent jewellery. The Empress was incensed at being upstaged by the Archduchess, and ordered her to remove her jewellery and also told her that she could no longer wear them. Heeding her instructions, Alexandra only decorated her hair with flowers when she attended a play some time later. The flowers highlighted her beauty, leading her to be applauded and being given a standing ovation, making Maria Theresa even more furious. Archduke Joseph could not protect his wife from these attacks. Furthermore, her Eastern Orthodox faith aroused the hostility of the Roman Catholic Austrian court, who urged her to convert.

Pavlovna was popular among Hungarians, both the nobles and the commoners. According to the legend, it was her suggestion to add the color green as the third color to the flag of Hungary. Hungarians had been using red and silver, then red and white as their national colors for centuries at the time. However, in the late 18th century, a third color was proposed to be added to the flag, to follow the style of the French tricolor. Pavlovna suggested green as a symbol for hope. By the mid-19th century, the red-white-green Hungarian tricolor became widespread.

== Death ==
Grand Duchess Alexandra Pavlovna, Archduchess of Austria and Palatina of Hungary, in Hungarian dress, c. 1800

Due to his responsibilities as Palatine, after a short stay in the Imperial court, Archduke Joseph and his wife moved to Hungary, where they settled in the Alcsút Palace, although they also normally returned to Vienna to spend time with the imperial family.

On 7 May 1800, the composer Ludwig van Beethoven played in the presence of Archduke Joseph and his wife Alexandra at the Buda Castle. This was part and main event of a week-long celebration organized by the Archduke in honor of his beautiful wife Alexandra.

Soon Alexandra was expecting her first child. The pregnancy was hard, as she was tormented by bouts of nausea. The doctor, following the orders of Empress Maria Theresa, was "more skilled in intrigues than in medicine, and moreover, with rude manners"; in addition, the cook prepared meals that she could not eat.

The childbirth, which lasted several hours, tormented Alexandra. Imperial confessor Andrew Samborski wrote:

When the midwife noticed that the natural forces of the Grand Duchess left her, then she presented it to the Palatine and talk to him about the exhaustion of his wife and received from His Highness the consent to use tools, which he pulled out a child who lived only a few hours.

A daughter, Archduchess Alexandrina Paulina of Austria, was born on 8 March 1801, but died within hours. She was named after her mother. Upon learning of the death of her daughter, Alexandra Pavlovna said:

Thank God that my daughter was now with the angels, without experiencing the misery that we are exposed to.

On the eighth day after the birth, Alexandra was allowed to get up, but in the evening she developed puerperal fever, which finally caused her early death on 16 March 1801 aged 17.

Hungarian historian Sándor Domanovszky related the event as follows:

On 8 March at 3 a.m. and after a long hesitation saw the light the daughter of the Archduchess, but she was so small and weak that she died on the same day. The young mother is a deep blow to stun. It had been two days earlier signs of a fever. Sickness didn't stop during the following days. Was held a consultation on 10 March, which established a gastric disease. The patient's condition rapidly deteriorated, however, during the next few days, so she was treated on 12 March against typhoid. During the night of 14–15 March, the Archduchess became delirious. This state of affairs lasted the whole day, until the morning of 16 March when she quietly breathed her last. The news of her death arrived to St. Petersburg within eight days after the death of her tyrannical father.

Her death occurred a week before her father's murder, which happened on 23 March 1801. News of her death reached her mother and siblings in Russia only at the end of the month. Both the events were terrible blows for the Romanov family.

== Burial ==
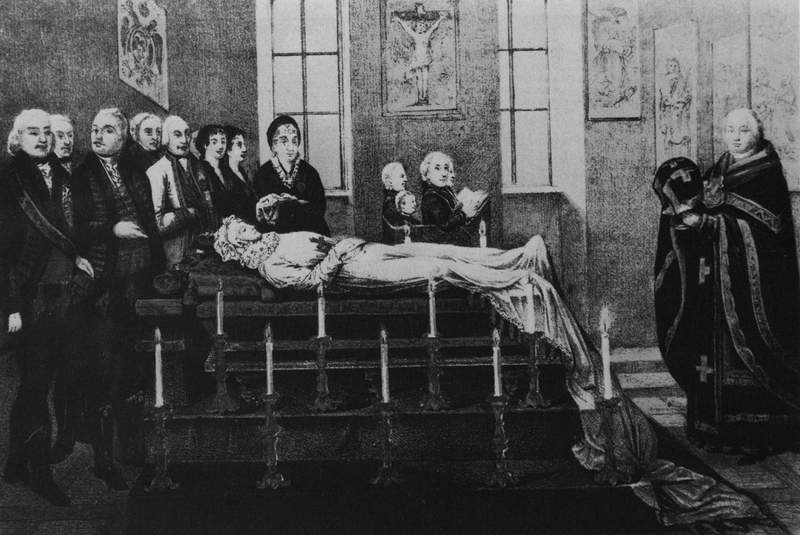
Burial in Buda (1801)

On 12 May, the body of the Archduchess was placed in the crypt of the Capuchin monastery of Víziváros (now Main Street 20).

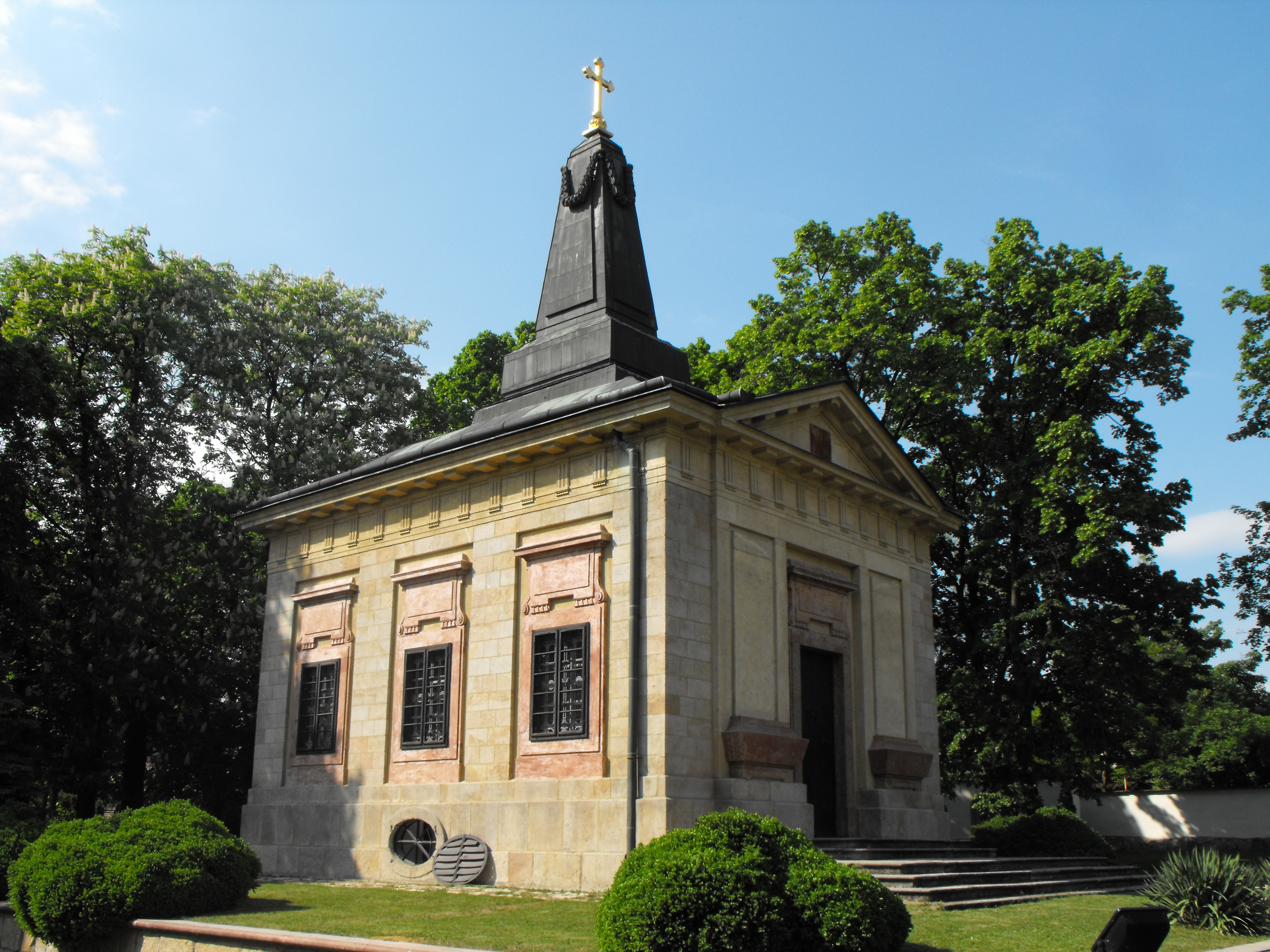
Chapel of Grand Duchess Alexandra Pavlovna in Üröm, Pest

Because the Austrian court refused her burial in any Catholic cemeteries, Alexandra's remains remained unburied at Víziváros monastery until 1803, when her widower built a mausoleum dedicated to her in Üröm near Pest, following the late Archduchess' wishes, and after her definitive burial in this place, an Eastern Orthodox service was held in her memory. In 1809, during the invasion of Napoleon's troops, Archduke Joseph ordered that the coffin with his wife's remains must be placed in Buda Castle for precaution, with a special Orthodox chapel prepared for this purpose. Once the threat of war was over, Alexandra's coffin was returned to the Üröm Mausoleum, which became a place of pilgrimage for the local Orthodox community. During the Congress of Vienna, Alexander I and the Grand Duchesses Maria Pavlovna and Ekaterina Pavlovna visited the grave of their sister.

Archduke Joseph remained a widower for several years, and only in 1815 remarried Princess Hermine of Anhalt-Bernburg-Schaumburg-Hoym, who died two years later in 1817, also after giving birth, though this time fraternal twins who survived. In 1819 the Archduke contracted his third and last marriage with Duchess Maria Dorothea of Württemberg, who bore him five children, of whom three survived infancy.

== Archives ==
Alexandra's letters to her grandfather Frederick II Eugene, Duke of Württemberg, together with letters from her siblings, written between 1795 and 1797 are preserved in the State Archive of Stuttgart (Hauptstaatsarchiv Stuttgart) in Stuttgart, Germany.

Alexandra's letters to her sister-in-law Maria Theresa of Naples and Sicily are preserved in the Haus-, Hof- und Staatsarchiv in Vienna, Austria.

== Ancestry ==
Ancestors of Grand Duchess Alexandra Pavlovna of Russia

16. Frederick IV, Duke of Holstein-Gottorp
8. Charles Frederick, Duke of Holstein-Gottorp
17. Princess Hedvig Sophia of Sweden
4. Peter III of Russia
18. Peter I of Russia
9. Grand Duchess Anna Petrovna of Russia
19. Catherine I of Russia
2. Paul I of Russia
20. John Louis I, Prince of Anhalt-Dornburg
10. Christian August, Prince of Anhalt-Zerbst
21. Christine Eleonore von Zeutch
5. Catherine II of Russia
22. Christian August of Holstein-Gottorp, Prince of Eutin
11. Princess Joanna Elisabeth of Holstein-Gottorp
23. Margravine Albertina Frederica of Baden-Durlach
1. Grand Duchess Alexandra Pavlovna of Russia
24. Frederick Charles, Duke of Württemberg-Winnental
12. Charles Alexander, Duke of Württemberg
25. Margravine Eleonore Juliane of Brandenburg-Ansbach
6. Frederick II Eugene, Duke of Württemberg
26. Anselm Franz, 2nd Prince of Thurn and Taxis
13. Princess Marie Auguste of Thurn and Taxis
27. Princess Maria Ludovika of Lobkowicz
3. Duchess Sophie Dorothea of Württemberg
28. Philip William, Margrave of Brandenburg-Schwedt
14. Frederick William, Margrave of Brandenburg-Schwedt
29. Princess Johanna Charlotte of Anhalt-Dessau
7. Margravine Friederike of Brandenburg-Schwedt
30. Frederick William I of Prussia
15. Princess Sophia Dorothea of Prussia
31. Princess Sophia Dorothea of Hanover

== Honours ==
- Dame Grand Cordon of the Order of Saint Catherine (1783)

== See also ==
- Alexandra Land

== Bibliography ==
- Volovik Oleg Evgenyevitch. Velikaya Kniaginya Alexandra Pavlovna. Semia, Jizny, Sudba, Pamiaty. Interpressfact. 2005. Budapest. ISBN 963-218-146-8 http://dinastia.org | http://rulit.org
- Palmer, Alan, Alexander I tsar of War and Peace, 1974. ISBN 0-06-013264-7
- Troyat, Henri, Catherine the Great, 1980. ISBN 0-425-05186-2
- Vendôme, Duchesse de (Princesse Henriette de Belgique): La Jeunesse de Marie-Amélie, Reine des Français, d’après son journal, París, Plon, 1935.
