= Prince Friedrich Heinrich Albrecht of Prussia =

German prince (1874–1940)

Prince Friedrich Heinrich Albrecht
- Prince of Prussia
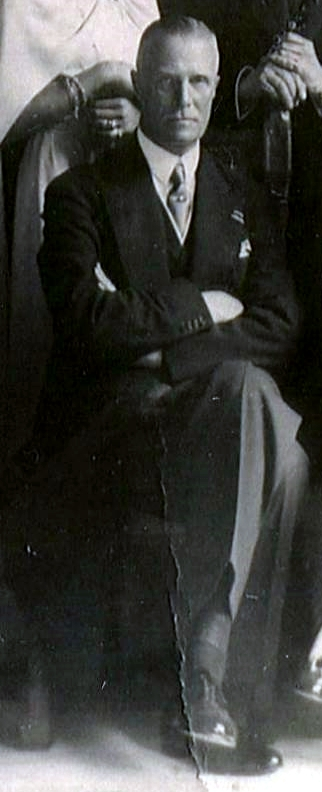
- Friedrich Heinrich in 1936
- Born: 15 April 1874; Kamenz, Kingdom of Prussia
- Died: 13 November 1940 (aged 66); Seidenberg, Nazi Germany
Names
- German: Wilhelm Ernst Alexander Friedrich Heinrich Albrecht
- House: Hohenzollern
- Father: Prince Albert of Prussia
- Mother: Princess Marie of Saxe-Altenburg

Prince Friedrich Heinrich Albrecht, Prince of Prussia (German: Wilhelm Ernst Alexander Friedrich Heinrich Albrecht Prinz von Preußen; 15 April 1874 in Hanover – 13 November 1940 in Seidenberg) was a Prussian officer, member of the house of Hohenzollern, and a great-grandson of Friedrich Wilhelm III of Prussia. He was persecuted for being homosexual.

== Early life ==
Friedrich Heinrich was the oldest son of Prince Albert of Prussia (1837–1906) and his wife, Princess Marie of Saxe-Altenburg (1854–1898). He stood over six feet tall.

He studied law at Friedrich-Wilhelms University in Bonn. In 1895, he became a member of the fraternity "Corps Borussia Bonn," and later became an honorary member of the Burschenschaft Vandalia Berlin. He traveled to Italy, Norway, and Sweden.

== Military career ==
After university, he took up a career as a commissioned officer. He began as a major in the 1st Guard Dragoon Regiment "Queen Victoria of Great Britain and Ireland," and then was called to the command of the German General Staff in 1902.

In 1904, he became the commander of the 1st Brandenburg Dragoon Regiment Number 2; he would rise to colonel on 21 May 1906.

== Homosexuality ==
He was relieved of his post as Commander of the Regiment at the beginning of 1907 and expelled from the Prussian Army because of his homosexuality. He was allowed to reenlist at the beginning of World War I as a private, but was denied promotion.

At the end of 1906, at the wishes of Kaiser Wilhelm II and as the heir of his deceased father, Friedrich Heinrich was voted the Herrenmeister of the Order of Saint John. However, due to increasing knowledge of his homosexuality, Prince Eitel Friedrich became the Herrenmeister instead. Journalist Maximilian Harden published an article on 27 April 1907 that this change in leadership was because the prince "suffers from an inherited version of inverted sex drive." This is likely a reference to his homosexual ancestor Prince Henry of Prussia (1726–1802).

In response to this publicity, Friedrich Heinrich left Berlin on the advice of Theobald von Bethmann Hollweg. He spent time in the south of France and Egypt before returning to Germany, where he lived in seclusion on his estates in Silesia.

At the beginning of 1910, he gave up his presidency of the Academy of Charitable Sciences at Erfurt to his brother Prince Friedrich Wilhelm of Prussia.

== Later years ==
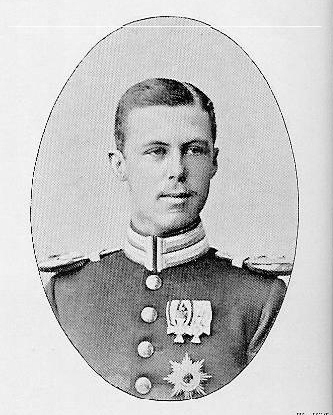
Prince Friedrich Heinrich of Prussia in his uniform (1895), before he was expelled from the Prussian Army due to homosexuality in 1907 by the Emperor Wilhelm II

His inheritance included the towns of Kamenz and Zawidów (German: Seidenberg) in the southeastern area of Province of Lower Silesia; his contributions to the economic development of the area and care for the townsfolk made him locally popular. With his own money, he established the Evangelical Church of the Holy Cross in Wölfelsgrund in 1911 and the Church of the Resurrection in Zawidów in 1913, and brought in deaconesses for local nursing homes. He also promoted local forestry and dispensed honors to locals.

He was never married and died without descendants, ending the paternal line of his grandfather, Prince Albrecht of Prussia, as his younger brother, Prince Friedrich Wilhelm (1880–1925) had only four daughters. He died on 13 November 1940 in Zawidów, at the age of 66. He was buried in the Mausoleum auf dem Hutberge, Kamenz, in what is today Poland.

After his death, Prince Waldemar of Prussia, the eldest son of Prince Henry of Prussia and the grandson of Friedrich III inherited the castle in Kamenz.

== Honours ==
- Kingdom of Prussia:
  - Knight of the Order of the Black Eagle, 15 July 1884; with Collar, 17 January 1893
  - Knight of the Order of the Prussian Crown, 1st Class, 15 July 1884
  - Grand Commander's Cross of the Royal House Order of Hohenzollern, 15 July 1884
  - Grand Cross of the Order of the Red Eagle, with Crown, 12 June 1892
- Austria-Hungary: Grand Cross of the Order of Saint Stephen, 1898
- Kingdom of Bavaria: Knight of the Order of Saint Hubert, 1898
- Denmark: Knight of the Order of the Elephant, 29 August 1903
- Baden: Knight of the House Order of Fidelity, 1904
- Spain: Grand Cross of the Order of Charles III, 30 May 1906
