= Ernst I of Saxe-Altenburg =

Duke of Saxe-Altenburg from 1853 to 1908

Ernst I
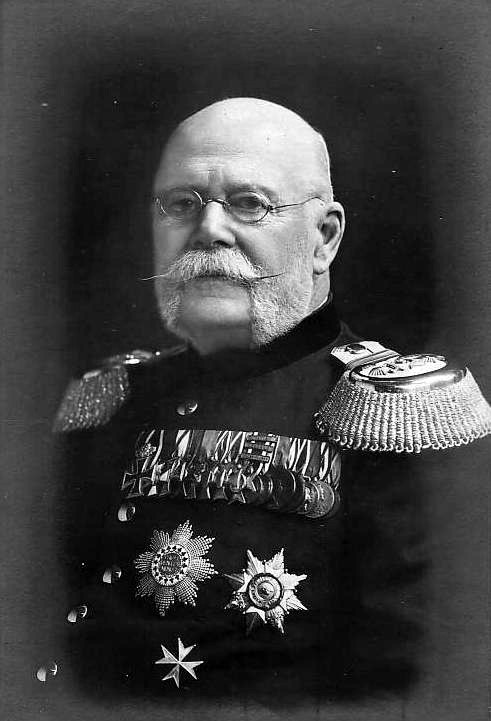
- Photograph, c. 1870

Duke of Saxe-Altenburg
- Reign: 3 August 1853 – 7 February 1908
- Predecessor: George
- Successor: Ernst II
- Born: 16 September 1826; Hildburghausen
- Died: 7 February 1908 (aged 81); Altenburg
- Spouse: Agnes of Anhalt-Dessau (m. 1853; died 1897)
- Issue: Marie, Princess Albert of Prussia
Names
- Ernst Frederick Paul Georg Nikolaus
- House: Wettin
- Father: Georg, Duke of Saxe-Altenburg
- Mother: Marie Luise of Mecklenburg-Schwerin
- Religion: Lutheranism

Ernst I, Duke of Saxe-Altenburg (German: Ernst I. Friedrich Paul Georg Nikolaus von Sachsen-Altenburg) (16 September 1826 in Hildburghausen – 7 February 1908 in Altenburg), was a duke of Saxe-Altenburg. He was the first son of Georg, Duke of Saxe-Altenburg and Marie Luise of Mecklenburg-Schwerin. In 1853, he succeeded his father as Duke of Saxe-Altenburg. He was of a retiring disposition and he took little active part in running the country. After a reign that lasted 55 years, he died without a living direct male heir; because of this, he was succeeded by his nephew, Ernst.

== Marriage ==
He was married in Dessau on 28 April 1853 to Agnes of Anhalt-Dessau (1824–1897). Agnes was a sister of Friedrich I, Duke of Anhalt.

They had two children:

- Marie (b. Eisenberg, 2 August 1854 – d. Camenz, 8 October 1898), married on 19 April 1873 to Albrecht of Prussia.
- Georg (b. Altenburg, 1 February 1856 – d. Altenburg, 29 February 1856) died in infancy.

== Honours and decorations ==
German honours

- (Saxe-Coburg and Gotha) (Duchy of Saxe-Altenburg) (Saxe-Meiningen) Ernestine duchies:
  - Joint Grand Master of the Saxe-Ernestine House Order, 3 August 1853
  - Service Award Cross (25 years)
- Saxe-Weimar-Eisenach: Grand Cross of the White Falcon, 24 February 1849
- Saxony: Knight of the Rue Crown, 1848
- Ascanian duchies: Grand Cross of Albert the Bear, 3 January 1852; with Swords, 1872
- Baden:
  - Knight of the House Order of Fidelity, 1881
  - Knight of the Order of Berthold the First, 1881
- Bavaria: Knight of St. Hubert, 1853
- Brunswick: Grand Cross of Henry the Lion, with Swords, 1876
- Hanover:
  - Knight of St. George, 1855
  - Grand Cross of the Royal Guelphic Order
  - Grand Cross of the Order of Ernst August
- Schaumburg-Lippe:
  - Cross of Honour of the House Order of Lippe, 1st Class with Crown
  - Military Merit Medal
- Mecklenburg:
  - Grand Cross of the Wendish Crown, with Collar
  - Military Merit Cross, 2nd Class (Schwerin)
- (Duchy of Nassau) Nassau Ducal Family: Knight of the Gold Lion of Nassau
- Oldenburg: Grand Cross of the Order of Duke Peter Friedrich Ludwig, with Golden Crown and Collar, 9 February 1852
- Kingdom of Prussia:
  - Knight of the Black Eagle, with Collar
  - Knight of the Red Eagle, 1st Class
  - Grand Commander of the Royal House Order of Hohenzollern
  - Knight of Honour of the Johanniter Order
  - Iron Cross, 2nd Class
- Württemberg: Grand Cross of the Württemberg Crown, 1868

Foreign honours

- Austrian Empire: Grand Cross of St. Stephen, 1859
- Belgium: Grand Cordon of the Royal Order of Leopold
- Denmark: Knight of the Elephant, 28 October 1882
- Netherlands: Grand Cross of the Netherlands Lion
- Ottoman Empire: Order of Osmanieh, 1st Class in Diamonds
- Kingdom of Romania: Grand Cross of the Star of Romania
- Russian Empire:
  - Knight of St. Andrew
  - Knight of St. George, 4th Class
- Kingdom of Serbia: Grand Cross of the Cross of Takovo
- Sweden-Norway: Knight of the Seraphim, 24 February 1864
- Grand Duchy of Tuscany: Grand Cross of the Military Order of St. Stephen

== Ancestry ==
Ancestors of Ernst I of Saxe-Altenburg

Ernest Frederick III, Duke of Saxe-Hildburghausen
Frederick, Duke of Saxe-Altenburg
Princess Ernestine of Saxe-Weimar
Georg, Duke of Saxe-Altenburg
Charles II, Grand Duke of Mecklenburg-Strelitz
Duchess Charlotte Georgine of Mecklenburg-Strelitz
Princess Friederike of Hesse-Darmstadt
Ernst I, Duke of Saxe-Altenburg
Friedrich Franz I, Grand Duke of Mecklenburg-Schwerin
Frederick Louis, Hereditary Grand Duke of Mecklenburg-Schwerin
Louise of Saxe-Gotha-Altenburg
Marie Luise of Mecklenburg-Schwerin
Paul I of Russia
Elena Pavlovna of Russia
Sophia Dorothea of Württemberg

German royalty
Preceded by Georg	Duke of Saxe-Altenburg; 1853–1908	Succeeded by Ernst II
