= Princess Agnes of Anhalt-Dessau =

Duchess of Saxe-Altenburg from 1853 to 1897

Princess Agnes
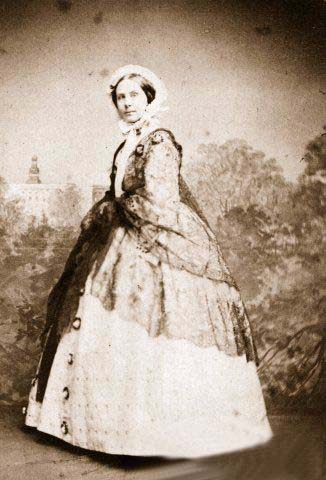
- Princess Agnes in the 1860s

Duchess consort of Saxe-Altenburg
- Tenure: 3 August 1853 – 23 October 1897
- Born: 24 June 1824; Dessau
- Died: 23 October 1897 (aged 73); Hummelshain
- Spouse: Ernst I, Duke of Saxe-Altenburg (m. 1853)
- Issue: Marie, Princess Albert of Prussia; Prince Georg
Names
- German: Friederike Amalie Agnes
- House: Ascania
- Father: Leopold IV, Duke of Anhalt
- Mother: Princess Frederica of Prussia

Princess Agnes of Anhalt-Dessau (Frederica Amalia Agnes; 24 June 1824 – 23 October 1897) was the eldest daughter of Leopold IV, Duke of Anhalt and Princess Frederica of Prussia. She was a member of the House of Ascania, and by her marriage to Ernst I, Duke of Saxe-Altenburg, Duchess consort of Saxe-Altenburg.

== Family ==
Agnes' father Duke Leopold was a child of Frederick, Hereditary Prince of Anhalt-Dessau by his wife Landgravine Amalie of Hesse-Homburg. Her mother Princess Frederica was the daughter of Prince Louis Charles of Prussia (brother of King Frederick William III of Prussia) by his wife Frederica of Mecklenburg-Strelitz.

Agnes was an older sister of Frederick I, Duke of Anhalt and Maria Anna, Princess Frederick Charles of Prussia. Through Maria Anna, Agnes was an aunt of Elisabeth Anna, Grand Duchess of Oldenburg and Louise Margaret, Duchess of Connaught and Strathearn.

== Marriage ==
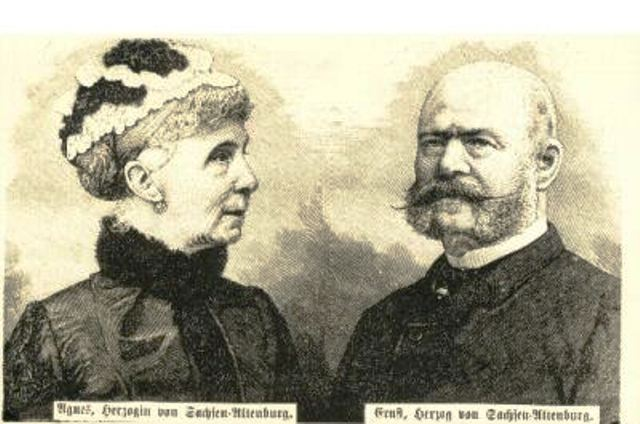
Agnes with her husband Ernst I, Duke of Saxe-Altenburg

On 28 April 1853, Agnes married Ernst of Saxe-Altenburg. He was a son of Georg, Duke of Saxe-Altenburg and Marie Luise of Mecklenburg-Schwerin, and succeeded his father as Duke of Saxe-Altenburg later that year. They had two children:

- Princess Marie Friederike Leopoldine Georgine Auguste Alexandra Elisabeth Therese Josephine Helene Sophie (2 August 1854 – 8 October 1898), married on 19 April 1873 to Prince Albrecht of Prussia.
- Prince Georg Leopold Ernst Joseph Alexander Friedrich Ludwig Johann Albert (1 February 1856 – 29 February 1856).

As their only son died as an infant, the duchy would be inherited by their nephew Ernst upon Ernst I's death in 1908.

== Life ==
Agnes was regarded as a talented painter.

Like many noblewomen of her time, she took an interest in charity, especially in nursing and the care of troops wounded in the Franco-German war.

In 1878 on the 25th anniversary of the couple's marriage, Ernst gave his wife the miniature newly created Knight's Cross First Class of the Saxe-Ernestine House Order, the so-called "Princesses Cross". On the occasion of the anniversary, the Ernst-Agnes-Stiftung (Ernst-Agnes Foundation) was established.

Agnes died on 23 October 1897, at the age of 73. In the city of Altenburg, Agnesplatz is named after her. She is buried in the Herzogin-Agnes-Gedächtniskirche (Duchess Agnes Memorial Church).

== Author ==
She was the author of Ein Wort an Israel ("A Word to Israel") (Leipzig, 1893), a book which dealt with antisemitism and Christianity in Germany. The book, published 1893 in German as Ein Wort an Israel as no. 37-38 of the academic series Institutum Judaicum zu Leipig. Schriften, was also translated into Italian as Una parola ad Israele.

== Sources ==
- Martin, Frederick (1866). The Statesman's Year Book, 1866. London: Macmillan and Co.
- Schoeppl, Heinrich Ferdinand: Die Herzoge von Sachsen-Altenburg. Bozen 1917, Neudruck Altenburg 1992.

Princess Agnes of Anhalt-Dessau House of Ascania Born: 24 June 1824 Died: 23 October 1897
German royalty
Preceded by Marie Louise of Mecklenburg-Schwerin	Duchess Consort of Saxe-Altenburg; 3 August 1853 – 23 October 1897	Succeeded by Adelaide of Schaumburg-Lippe
