= Georg, Duke of Saxe-Altenburg =

Duke of Saxe-Altenburg from 1848 to 1853

Georg
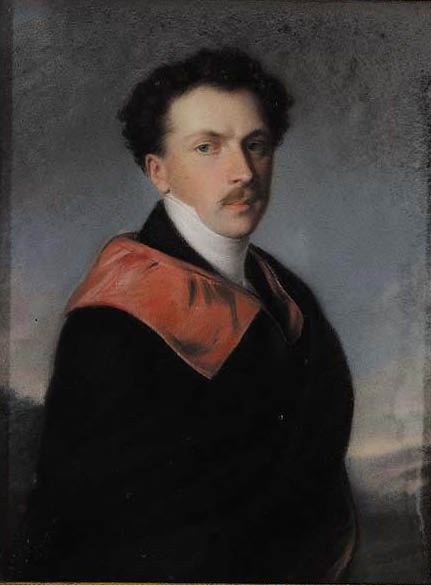

Duke of Saxe-Altenburg
- Reign: 30 November 1848 – 3 August 1853
- Predecessor: Joseph
- Successor: Ernst I
- Born: 24 July 1796; Hildburghausen
- Died: 3 August 1853 (aged 57); Hummelshain
- Spouse: Duchess Marie Louise of Mecklenburg-Schwerin (m. 1825)
- Issue: Ernst I; Prince Albrecht Frederick; Prince Moritz
Names
- Georg Karl Frederick
- House: Wettin
- Father: Frederick, Duke of Saxe-Hildburghausen
- Mother: Duchess Charlotte Georgine of Mecklenburg-Strelitz
- Religion: Lutheranism

Georg Karl Frederick (24 July 1796 in Hildburghausen – 3 August 1853 in Hummelshain) was Duke of Saxe-Altenburg from 1848 to 1853.

== Early life ==
Georg was born on 24 July 1796, the fourth but second surviving son of Frederick, Duke of Saxe-Hildburghausen (of Saxe-Altenburg from 1826) and Duchess Charlotte Georgine of Mecklenburg-Strelitz.

Georg served in the Austrian army from 1804 onwards. He fought in the Wars of Liberation along with older brother Joseph in which he entered Paris victoriously alongside Karl Philipp, Prince of Schwarzenberg in the Battle of Leipzig. During the Italian campaign in 1814, the prince was wounded in the left thigh and had to end his military career.

He went back to Hildburghausen where he lived with his brother Joseph in Hildburghausen Castle. From 1816 to 1820, Georg studied at Heidelberg University and was appointed personal adjutant by Maximilian I of Bavara and in 1822, he was awarded with the Order of Saint Hubert by the King. He received permission to take up permanent residence in Hildburghausen, where he remodeled the castle in Hellingen. He founded a youth militia in Hildburghausen and municipal saving banks.

== Marriage and issue ==
Georg married Duchess Marie Louise of Mecklenburg-Schwerin in Ludwigslust on 7 October 1825. She was a daughter of Frederick Louis, Hereditary Grand Duke of Mecklenburg-Schwerin and Grand Duchess Elena Pavlovna of Russia.

They had three sons:

1. Ernst I Frederick Paul Georg Nikolaus (b. Hildburghausen, 16 September 1826 – d. Altenburg, 7 February 1908); married Princess Agnes of Anhalt-Dessau.
2. Albrecht Frederick August Bernhard Ludwig Anton Carl Gustav Eduard (b. Hildburghausen, 31 October 1827 – d. Ludwigslust, 28 May 1835) died in childhood.
3. Moritz Franz Friedrich Constantin Alexander Heinrich August Carl Albrecht (b. Eisenberg, 24 October 1829 – d. Arco, Italy, 13 May 1907); married Princess Augusta of Saxe-Meiningen.

== Adult years ==
In 1826, following the extinction of the senior line of Saxe-Gotha-Altenburg, Ernestine duchies were reorganized. As part of the territorial adjustment, Georg's father, Frederick, Duke Saxe-Hildburghausen left the Duchy of Saxe-Hildburghausen on 17 November 1826, and became Duke of the newly created Saxe-Altenburg, though he remained in Hildburghausen until 1829.

When he moved to Christiansburg Castle in Eisenburg, he farewell words to the town council were, "It made me happy to remain among the inhabitants of this town for a few more years after the departure of my relatives, as I believe that by staying longer I can be of service to my good countrymen."

The Eisenberg superintendent, Christian Wilhelm Klötzner, described him as "A noble figure, handsome face, bright friendly eyes, dignified bearing, with a clear mind, deep heart, firm will, keen sense of nature and art, affable, simply content with his own needs, frugal yet cheerful, and in his love for his wife and sons the model of a proper family father". When his father Frederick, Duke of Saxe-Altenburg died on 29 September 1834, his older brother succeeded him as Joseph, Duke of Saxe-Altenburg. He later lived in the Prince's palace in Altenburg.

== Reign and death ==
When Joseph, Duke of Saxe-Altenburg was forced to abdicated on 30 November 1848 during the Revolutions of 1848, He succeeded his brother as Duke of Saxe-Altenburg. He reformed the financial administration, founded the "Georg Society" to promote art and crafts, and continued to develop Eisenberg Castle. In 1850, he established a loan fund for poor craftsmen and used his own funds for poor relief, earning him the nickname Georg the Good. He ceremoniously the Altenburg battalion of his brother Eduard, which had fought victoriously in the First Schleswig War.

He suffered from health issues as early as 28 May 1853, he handed over the government to his son Ernst. Georg died in Hummelshain hunting lodge on 3 August 1853 at the age of 57.

== Ancestry ==
Ancestors of Georg, Duke of Saxe-Altenburg

8. Ernst Frederick II, Duke of Saxe-Hildburghausen
4. Ernest Frederick III, Duke of Saxe-Hildburghausen
9. Countess Caroline of Erbach-Fürstenau
2. Frederick, Duke of Saxe-Altenburg
10. Ernest Augustus I, Duke of Saxe-Weimar-Eisenach
5. Princess Ernestine of Saxe-Weimar
11. Margravine Sophie Charlotte of Brandenburg-Bayreuth
1. Georg, Duke of Saxe-Altenburg
12. Duke Charles Louis Frederick of Mecklenburg-Strelitz
6. Charles II, Grand Duke of Mecklenburg-Strelitz
13. Princess Elisabeth Albertine of Saxe-Hildburghausen
3. Duchess Charlotte Georgine of Mecklenburg-Strelitz
14. Prince George William of Hesse-Darmstadt
7. Princess Friederike of Hesse-Darmstadt
15. Countess Maria Louise Albertine of Leiningen-Dagsburg-Falkenburg

Preceded by Joseph	Duke of Saxe-Altenburg; 1848–1853	Succeeded by Ernst I
