= Duchess Marie Louise of Mecklenburg-Schwerin =

Duchess of Saxe-Altenburg from 1848 to 1853

Princess Marie Louise
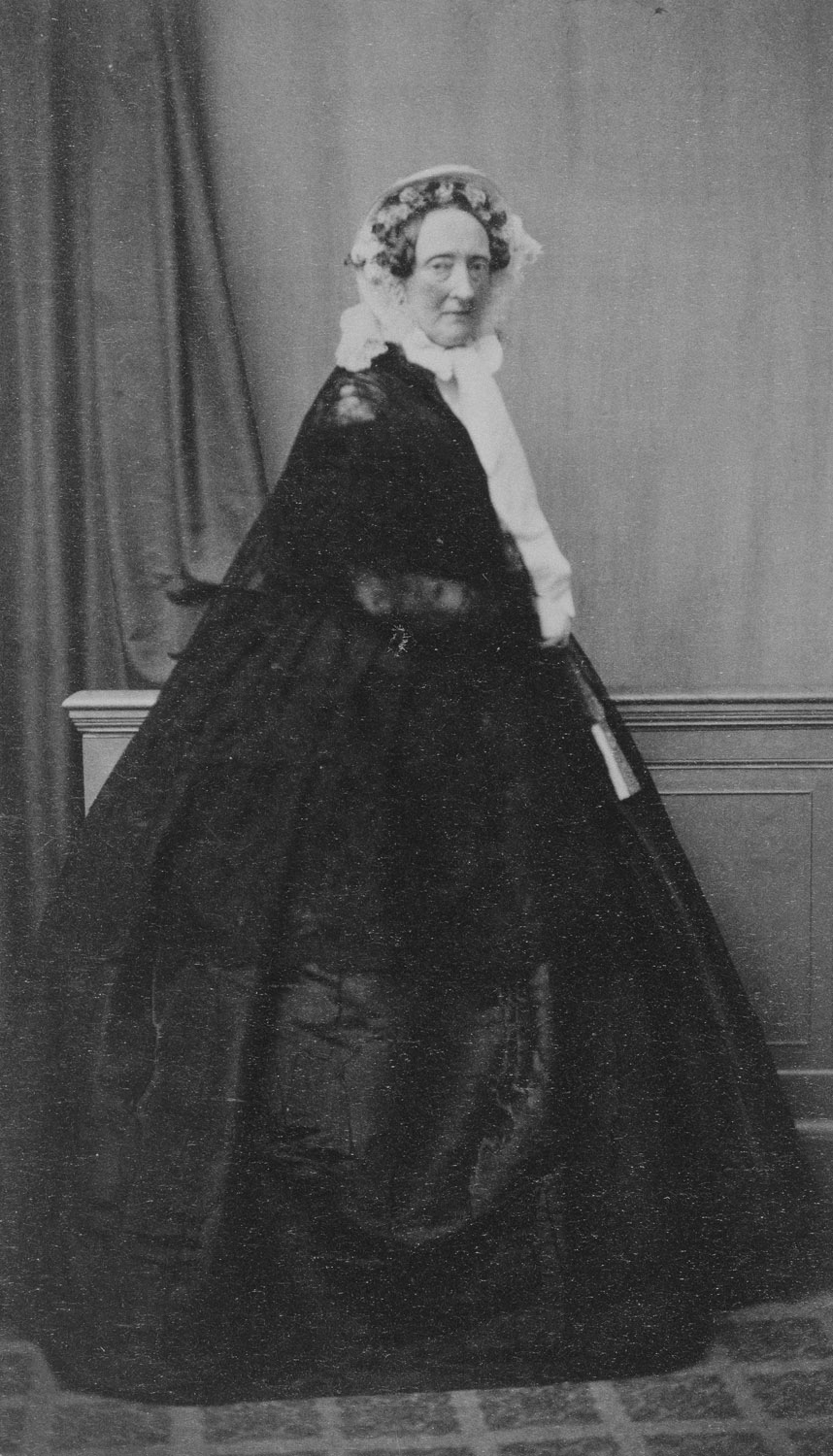
- Marie Louise c. 1855

Duchess consort of Saxe-Altenburg
- Tenure: 30 November 1848 – 3 August 1853
- Born: 31 March 1803; Ludwigslust Palace, Duchy of Mecklenburg-Schwerin, Holy Roman Empire
- Died: 26 October 1862 (aged 59); Elisabethenburg Palace, Duchy of Saxe-Meiningen, German Confederation
- Spouse: Georg, Duke of Saxe-Altenburg (m. 1825; died 1853)
- Issue: Ernst I, Duke of Saxe-Altenburg; Prince Albrecht; Prince Moritz
Names
- German: Marie Luise Friederike Alexandrine Elisabeth Charlotte Catherine
- House: Mecklenburg-Schwerin
- Father: Frederick Louis, Hereditary Grand Duke of Mecklenburg-Schwerin
- Mother: Grand Duchess Elena Pavlovna of Russia

Duchess Marie Louise of Mecklenburg-Schwerin (German: Herzogin Marie Luise Friederike Alexandrine Elisabeth Charlotte Catherine Mecklenburg-Schwerin; 31 March 1803 – 26 October 1862) was the Duchess of Saxe-Altenburg. She was the daughter of Frederick Louis, Hereditary Grand Duke of Mecklenburg-Schwerin, and Grand Duchess Elena Pavlovna of Russia. In 1825, she married Georg, Duke of Saxe-Altenburg, and became his consort.

== Early life ==
Marie Louise was born on 31 March 1803 in the Ludwigslust Palace in Ludwigslust, Mecklenburg-Schwerin. She was the second child and first daughter of Frederick Louis, Hereditary Grand Duke of Mecklenburg-Schwerin, and Grand Duchess Elena Pavlovna of Russia. Frederick Louis was the son of Frederick Francis I, Grand Duke of Mecklenburg-Schwerin, and Princess Louise of Saxe-Gotha-Altenburg, while Elena Pavlovna was the daughter of Paul I of Russia and Duchess Sophie Dorothea of Württemberg. Through her father's second marriage, she had a younger half-sister, Helene whom, through her marriage in 1837 to the eldest son of Louis Philippe I, became the Duchess of Orleans.

== Marriage ==
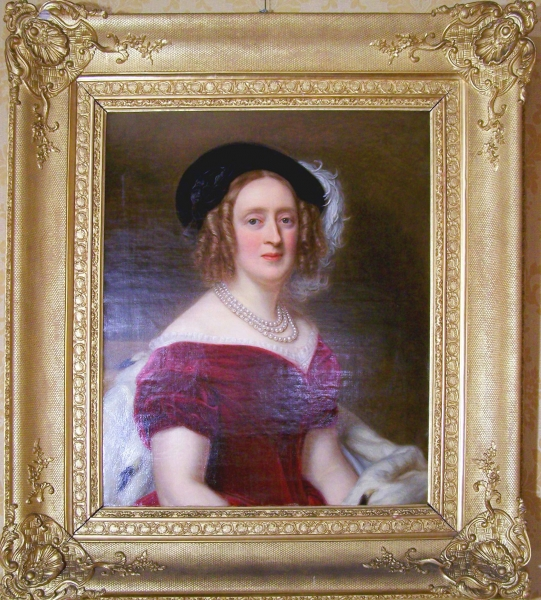
Portrait of Marie Louise by Joseph Karl Stieler, 1851

On 7 October 1825 in Ludwigslust, at the age of 22, Marie Louise married 29-year-old Georg, Duke of Saxe-Altenburg. Georg was the son of Frederick, Duke of Saxe-Altenburg, and Duchess Charlotte Georgine of Mecklenburg-Strelitz. The newly-wedded couple would live in Charlottenburg Palace in Hildburghausen until 1829.

The marriage was, reportedly, very happy. The local superintendent Klötzner said: "in his love for his wife and sons, he was the model of a real family man."

They had three sons:

1. Ernst I, Duke of Saxe-Altenburg (b. Hildburghausen, 16 September 1826 – d. Altenburg, 7 February 1908); married Princess Agnes of Anhalt-Dessau.
2. Prince Albrecht Frederick August (b. Hildburghausen, 31 October 1827 – d. Ludwigslust, 28 May 1835).
3. Prince Moritz of Saxe-Altenburg (b. Eisenberg, 24 October 1829 – d. Arco, Italy, 13 May 1907); married Princess Augusta of Saxe-Meiningen.

== Ancestry ==
Ancestors of Duchess Marie Louise of Mecklenburg-Schwerin

8. Duke Louis of Mecklenburg-Schwerin
4. Frederick Francis I, Grand Duke of Mecklenburg-Schwerin
9. Princess Charlotte Sophie of Saxe-Coburg-Saalfeld
2. Frederick Louis, Hereditary Grand Duke of Mecklenburg-Schwerin
10. Prince John August of Saxe-Gotha-Altenburg
5. Princess Louise of Saxe-Gotha-Altenburg
11. Princess Louise Reuss of Schleiz
1. Duchess Marie Louise of Mecklenburg-Schwerin
12. Peter III of Russia
6. Paul I of Russia
13. Princess Sophie of Anhalt-Zerbst; Catherine II of Russia
3. Grand Duchess Elena Pavlovna of Russia
14. Frederick II Eugene, Duke of Württemberg
7. Duchess Sophie Dorothea of Württemberg
15. Princess Friederike of Brandenburg-Schwedt

== Bibliography ==
- The Royal House of Stuart, London, 1969, 1971, 1976, Addington, A. C., Reference:
- Het Groothertogelijk Huis Mecklenburg, Bergen-op-Zoom, 1901–1902, Juten, W. J. F., Reference: page 112

Duchess Marie Louise of Mecklenburg-Schwerin House of Mecklenburg Born: 31 March 1803 Died: 26 October 1862
German royalty
Preceded by Duchess Amelia of Württemberg	Duchess consort of Saxe-Altenburg; 30 November 1848 – 3 August 1853	Succeeded by Princess Agnes of Anhalt-Dessau
