= Grand Duchess Elena Pavlovna of Russia =

Grand Duchess of Russia

Grand Duchess Elena Pavlovna
- Hereditary Princess of Mecklenburg-Schwerin
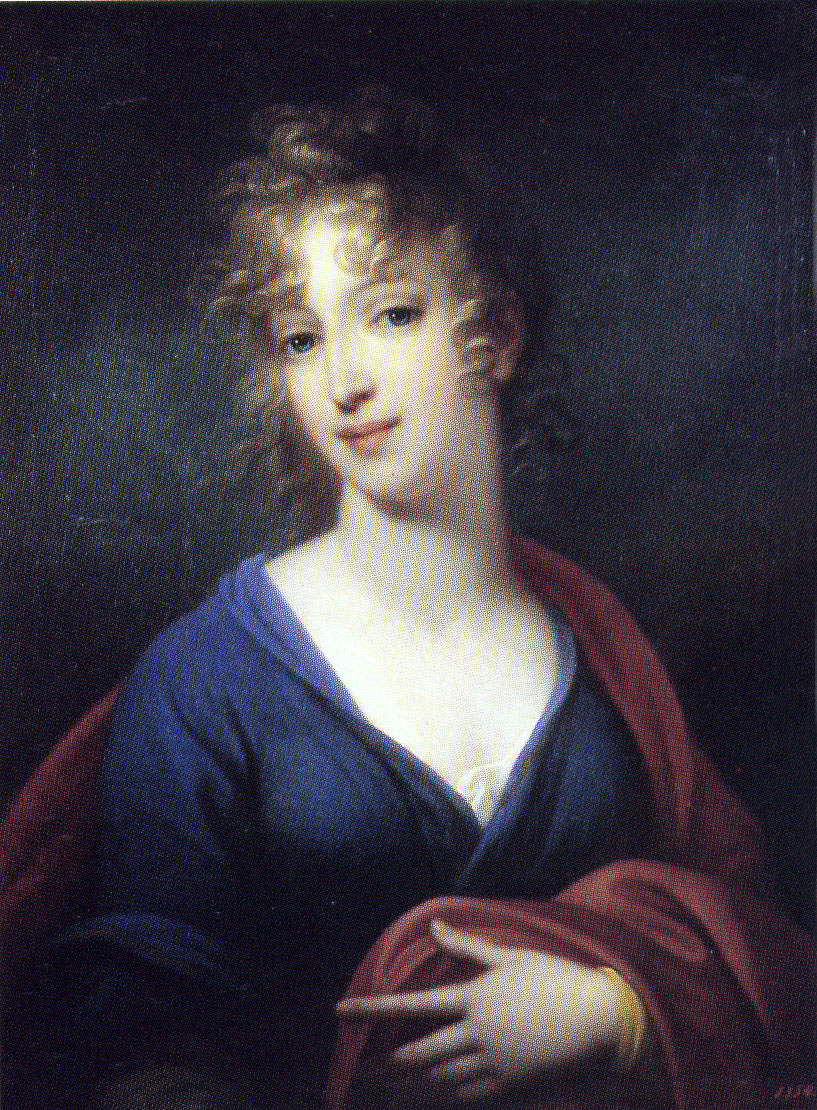
- Portrait by Josef Grassi, 1802
- Born: 24 December 1784; Saint Petersburg, Russian Empire
- Died: 24 September 1803 (aged 18); Ludwigslust, Mecklenburg-Schwerin
- Burial: Helena Paulovna Mausoleum, Ludwigslust, Germany
- Spouse: Frederick Louis, Hereditary Prince of Mecklenburg-Schwerin (m. 1799)
- Issue: Paul Frederick, Grand Duke of Mecklenburg-Schwerin; Marie Louise, Duchess of Saxe-Altenburg
- House: Holstein-Gottorp-Romanov
- Father: Paul I of Russia
- Mother: Sophie Dorothea of Württemberg

Elena Pavlovna (Russian: Елена Павловна; 24 December [O.S. 13 December] 1784 – 24 September [O.S. 12 September] 1803) was a grand duchess of Russia as the daughter of Paul I, the Russian emperor, and later became the Hereditary Princess of Mecklenburg-Schwerin as the wife of the Hereditary Prince Frederick Louis (1778–1819), who later become Hereditary Grand Duke.

== Early life ==
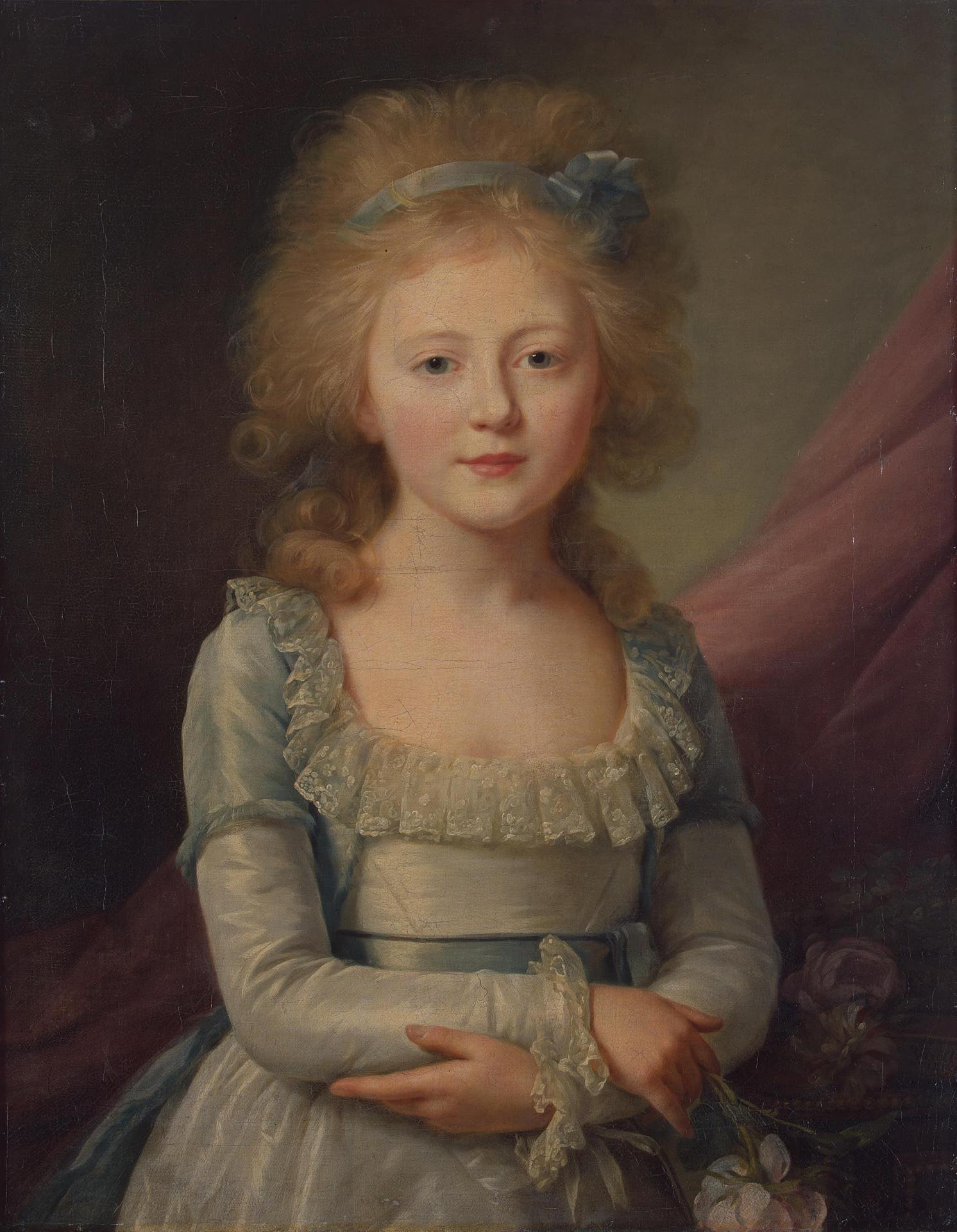
Elena Pavlovna painted by Jean-Louis Vollie, 1792, around the age of seven

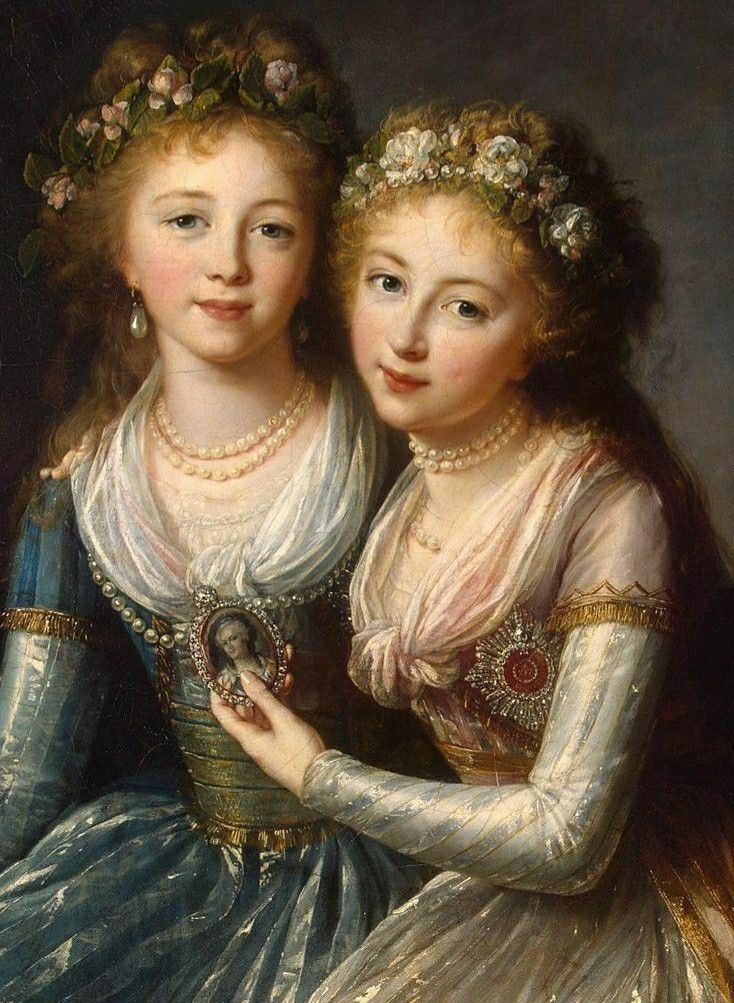
Elena Pavlovna (right, in pink) with her elder sister Alexandra Pavlovna (left, in blue) painted by Élisabeth Vigée Le Brun, c. 1795–1797

Grand Duchess Elena Pavlovna Romanova was born in Saint Petersburg in the Russian Empire as the fourth child and second daughter of Tsesarevich Paul Petrovich of Russia (1754–1801) and his second wife, Tsesarevna Maria Feodorovna, born Duchess Sophie Dorothea of Württemberg (1759–1828).

Out of her nine siblings, Elena was closest to her elder sister Alexandra Pavlovna, whom their paternal grandmother Catherine the Great compared unfavourably to Elena. At the age of six months, Elena was deemed smarter and more charming than her two-year-old sister Alexandra. However, as the sisters matured, Catherine loved both of them equally.

Elena was educated privately at home, for the first years, under the supervision of her grandmother, Catherine the Great. Her education was focused mainly on fine arts, literature and music.

== Marriage and life in Schwerin ==
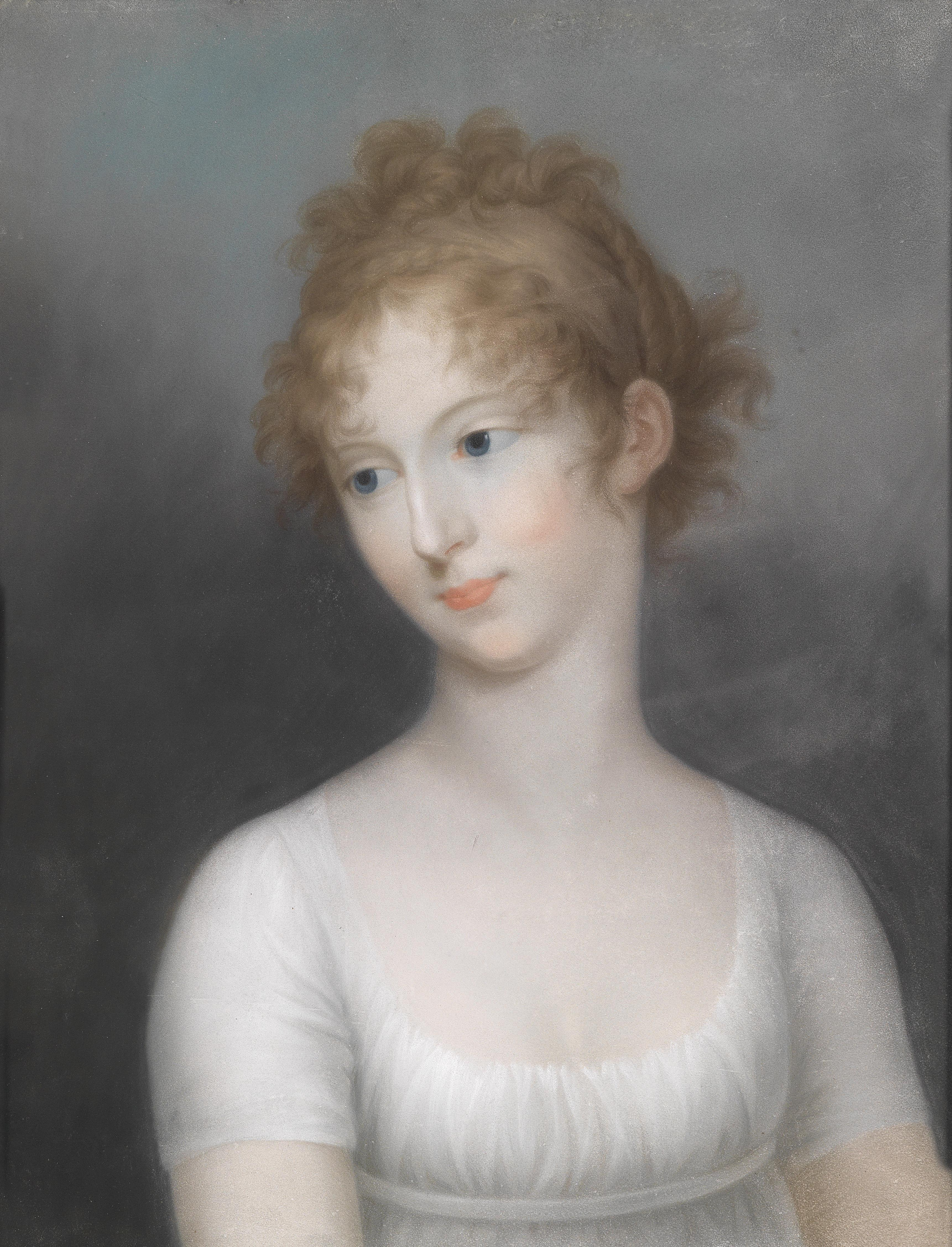
Portrait by Friedrich Erhard Wagener

In 1798, negotiations took place about the marriage of Elena Pavlovna and the heir of the Duchy of Mecklenburg-Schwerin, Hereditary Grand Duke Frederick Louis (1778–1819), the eldest son of Frederick Francis I, Grand Duke of Mecklenburg-Schwerin, and Princess Louise of Saxe-Gotha-Altenburg. The formal betrothal was celebrated on 5 May 1799, and on 23 October 1799, they were married at the Great Gatchina Palace near Saint Petersburg.

Elena Pavlovna moved to Schwerin with her husband and led a content married life there. On 15 September 1800 she gave birth to her firstborn son, Paul Frederick, who would go on to inherit the throne of the grand duchy. He was named after his grandfathers. On 16 March 1801, Elena Pavlovna's sister Archduchess Alexandra Pavlovna of Austria died in Buda in childbirth. Only eight days later her father was assassinated. On 31 March 1803 she gave birth to a daughter, Marie Louise, named after her grandmothers, who would later become the duchess of Saxe-Altenburg.

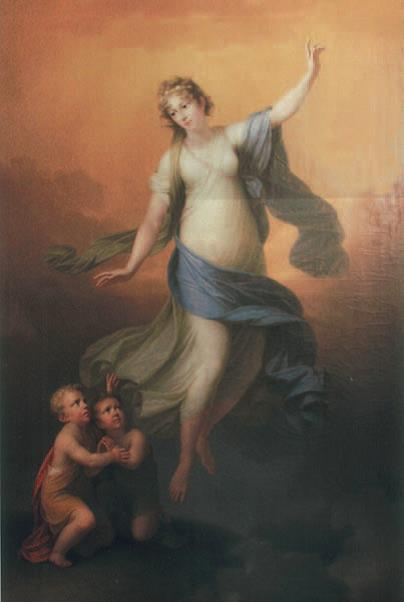
Apotheosis of Elena Pavlovna by Rudolph Suhrlandt, 1806

== Death and burial ==
In September 1803, Elena Pavlovna fell gravely ill and died suddenly on 24 September. She was buried in the Helena Paulovna Mausoleum in Ludwigslust. Her widower, Frederick Louis, remarried two times and had more children, but never succeeded to the throne, as his father outlived him.

== Issue ==
Hereditary Princess Elena Pavlovna had two children with her husband, Hereditary Prince Frederick Louis (1778–1819), both of whom survived to adulthood:

- Paul Frederick, Grand Duke of Mecklenburg-Schwerin (15 September 1800 – 7 March 1842), who inherited the throne of the duchy, married Princess Alexandrine of Prussia (1803–1892) in 1822 and had issue.
- Marie Louise Friederike Alexandrine Elizabeth Charlotte Catherine, Duchess of Saxe-Altenburg (31 March 1803 – 26 October 1862), who married Georg, Duke of Saxe-Altenburg on 7 October 1825 and had issue.

== Letters ==
Elena Pavlovna's letters to her maternal grandfather, Frederick II Eugene, Duke of Württemberg, written between 1795 and 1797, are preserved in the State Archive of Stuttgart in Stuttgart, Germany.

== Ancestry ==
Ancestors of Grand Duchess Elena Pavlovna of Russia

8. Charles Frederick, Duke of Holstein-Gottorp
4. Peter III of Russia
9. Grand Duchess Anna Petrovna of Russia
2. Paul I of Russia
10. Christian August, Prince of Anhalt-Zerbst
5. Catherine II of Russia
11. Princess Johanna Elisabeth of Holstein-Gottorp
1. Grand Duchess Elena Pavlovna of Russia
12. Charles Alexander, Duke of Württemberg
6. Frederick II Eugene, Duke of Württemberg
13. Princess Marie Auguste of Thurn and Taxis
3. Duchess Sophie Dorothea of Württemberg
14. Frederick William, Margrave of Brandenburg-Schwedt
7. Princess Friederike of Brandenburg-Schwedt
15. Princess Sophia Dorothea of Prussia

== Bibliography ==
- Alan Palmer: Alexander I.
- Zoé Oldenbourg: Katharina II.
