= Friedrich, Hereditary Prince of Anhalt =

Friedrich
- Hereditary Prince of Anhalt
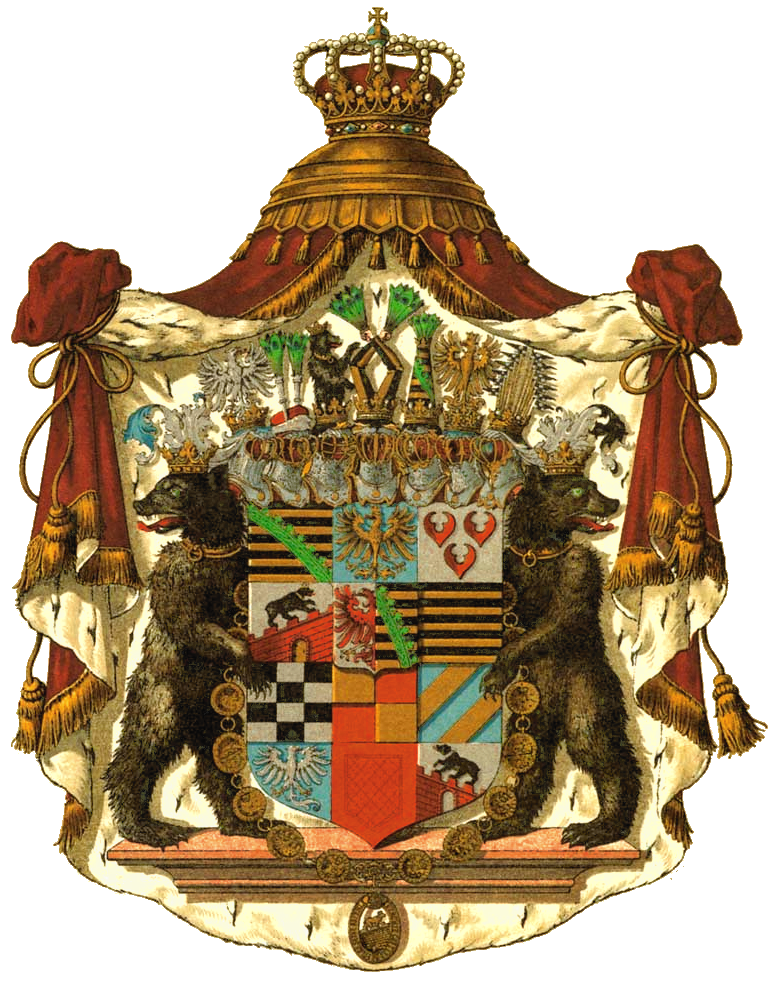

Head of the House of Ascania
- Period: 18 February 1947 - 9 October 1963
- Predecessor: Joachim Ernst, Duke of Anhalt (as Duke of Anhalt)
- Successor: Eduard Prinz von Anhalt
- Born: 11 April 1938; Ballenstedt, Free State of Anhalt, Nazi Germany
- Died: 9 October 1963 (aged 25); Munich, Bavaria, West Germany
Names
- Leopold Friedrich Franz Sieghard Hubertus Erdmann Erbprinz von Anhalt
- House: Ascania
- Father: Joachim Ernst, Duke of Anhalt
- Mother: Editha Marwitz von Stephani

Leopold Friedrich Franz Sieghard Hubertus Erdmann, Hereditary Prince of Anhalt (11 April 1938 – 9 October 1963) was the head of the House of Ascania, the family which ruled the Duchy of Anhalt until 1918.

== Life ==
He was born at Ballenstedt Castle, a castle belonging to the ducal family of Anhalt, as the eldest son of Duke Joachim Ernst of Anhalt and his second wife, Editha Marwitz (von Stephani, by adoption).

Prince Friedrich succeeded his father as head of the Ducal House of Anhalt and titular Duke of Anhalt following his death in NKVD special camp number 2 (formerly Buchenwald concentration camp) as a prisoner of the Soviet Union on 18 February 1947. The succession of Prince Friedrich was disputed by his uncle, Prince Eugen, who also claimed the headship of the house after the death of Duke Joachim Ernst.

Prince Friedrich died on 9 October 1963 in Munich, Bavaria after being involved in a car crash. Following his death, he was succeeded as head of the ducal house by his younger brother, Prince Eduard.

== Ancestry ==
Ancestors of Friedrich, Hereditary Prince of Anhalt

16. Leopold IV, Duke of Anhalt
8. Frederick I, Duke of Anhalt
17. Princess Frederica of Prussia, Duchess of Anhalt-Dessau
4. Eduard, Duke of Anhalt
18. Prince Eduard of Saxe-Altenburg
9. Princess Antoinette of Saxe-Altenburg
19. Princess Amalie of Hohenzollern-Sigmaringen
2. Joachim Ernst, Duke of Anhalt
20. Georg, Duke of Saxe-Altenburg
10. Prince Moritz of Saxe-Altenburg
21. Duchess Marie Louise of Mecklenburg-Schwerin
5. Princess Louise of Saxe-Altenburg
22. Bernhard II, Duke of Saxe-Meiningen
11. Princess Augusta of Saxe-Meiningen
23. Princess Marie Frederica of Hesse-Kassel
1. Friedrich, Prince of Anhalt
6. Wilhelm Horn
3. Editha Marwitz von Stephani
7. Irmgard Klara Franziska Marwitz

Friedrich, Hereditary Prince of Anhalt House of Ascania Born: 11 April 1938 Died: 9 October 1963
Titles in pretence
Preceded by Duke Joachim Ernst	— TITULAR — Duke of Anhalt; 18 February 1947 – 9 October 1963; Reason for succession failure: Duchy abolished in 1918	Succeeded by Prince Eduard
Honorary titles
Preceded by Duke Joachim Ernst	Grand Master of the Order of Albert the Bear; 18 February 1947 – 9 October 1963	Succeeded by Prince Eduard
