= Joachim Ernst, Duke of Anhalt =

Duke of Anhalt in 1918

Joachim Ernst
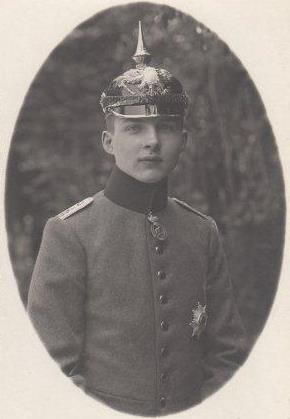
- Joachim Ernst in 1918

Duke of Anhalt
- Reign: 13 September 1918 – 12 November 1918
- Predecessor: Eduard
- Successor: Monarchy abolished
- Born: 11 January 1901; Dessau, Duchy of Anhalt
- Died: 18 February 1947 (aged 46); NKVD special camp Nr. 2, Weimar, Allied-occupied Germany
- Spouse: Elisabeth Strickrodt, Countess of Askanien (m. 1927; div. 1929) Edda Marwitz von Stephani (m. 1929)
- Issue: Princess Alexandra; Princess Anna Luise; Prince Friedrich; Princess Edda; Prince Eduard
Names
- Joachim Ernst Wilhelm Karl Albrecht Leopold Friedrich Moritz Erdmann Herzog von Anhalt
- House: Ascania
- Father: Eduard, Duke of Anhalt
- Mother: Princess Louise Charlotte of Saxe-Altenburg

Joachim Ernst, Duke of Anhalt (Joachim Ernst Wilhelm Karl Albrecht Leopold Friedrich Moritz Erdmann; 11 January 1901 – 18 February 1947) was the last ruler of the Duchy of Anhalt, a state of the German Empire, from 13 September to 12 November 1918.

Thus Joachim Ernst was the last ruler of a constituent state within the German Empire to succeed to the throne before the abolition of the German monarchies in 1918, and the only German monarch to be born in the 20th century. His abdication ended the rule of the House of Ascania in central Germany, which had lasted since the 11th century.

== Biography ==
=== Early life ===
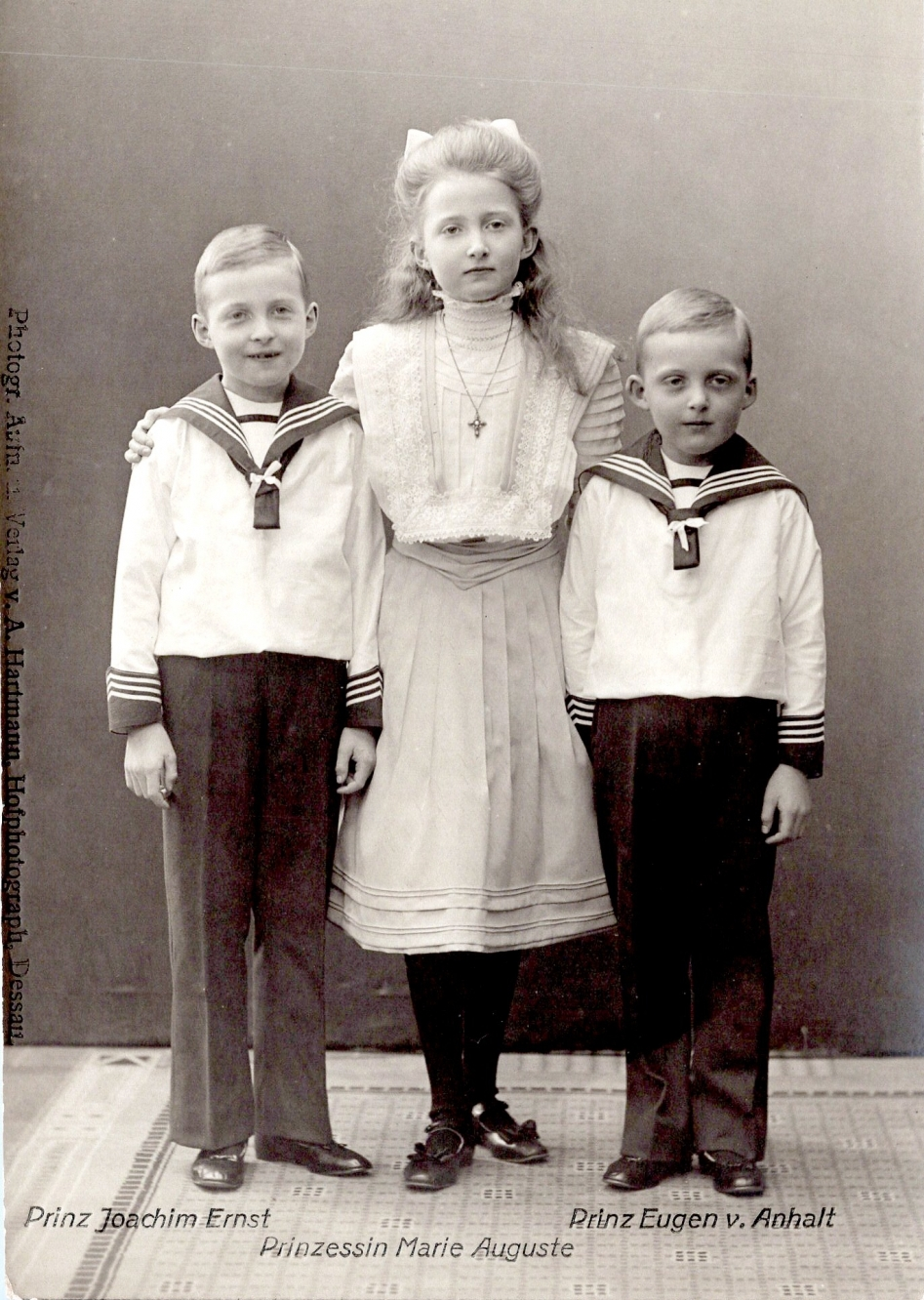
Prince Joachim Ernst with his elder sister Princess Marie Auguste and younger brother Prince Eugen in 1910

Prince Joachim Ernst was born on 11 January 1901 in Dessau, the then capital of the small duchy of Anhalt in central Germany. He was the fourth child and eldest surviving son of Prince Eduard of Anhalt (1861–1918) and Princess Louise Charlotte of Saxe-Altenburg (1873–1953). His father was the third son of the then reigning Duke Friedrich I of Anhalt (1831–1904) and his wife Princess Antoinette of Saxe-Altenburg (1838–1908), and his mother was a daughter of Prince Moritz of Saxe-Altenburg (1829–1907) and his wife Princess Augusta of Saxe-Meiningen (1843–1919).

=== Reign ===
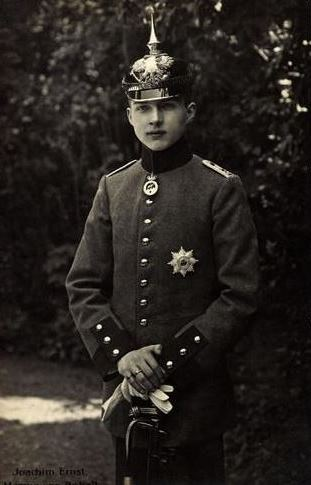
Joachim Ernst in May 1918

He succeeded his father as Duke of Anhalt on 13 September 1918. However, due to his age, his uncle Prince Aribert of Anhalt was appointed regent. His brief reign came to an end on 12 November 1918, with his uncle abdicating in his name following the German revolution. As a result of this revolution, the monarchy of Anhalt was abolished along with the other monarchies of the German states, ending the House of Ascania's rule in central Germany, which had lasted for almost a millennium since the 11th century.

=== Later life ===
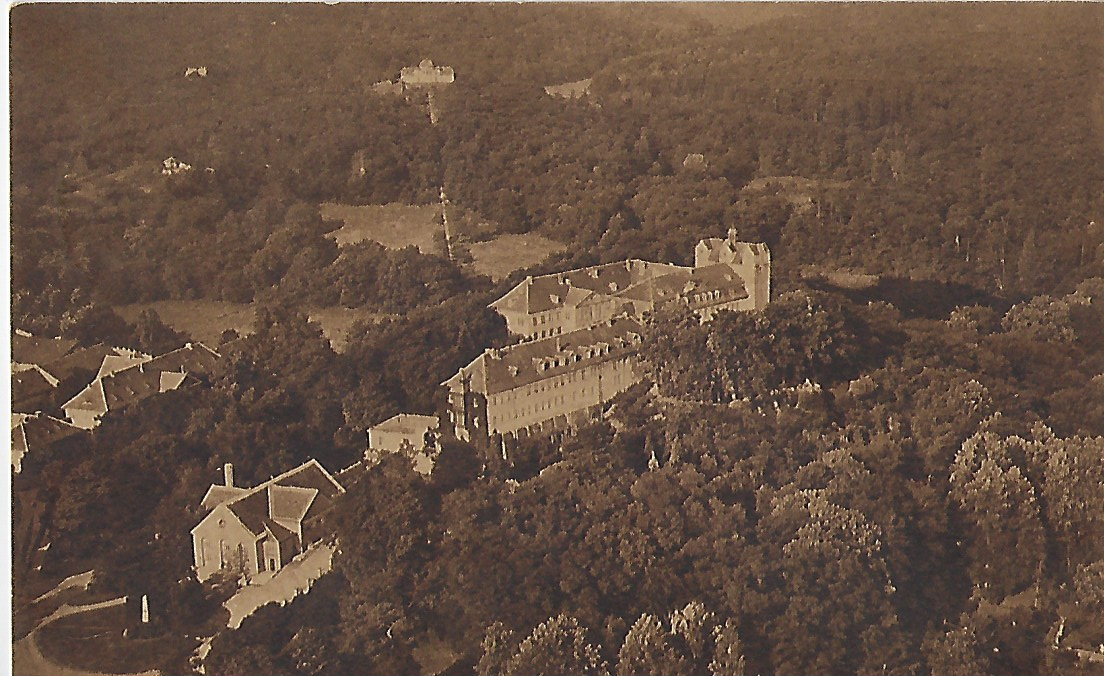
Ballenstedt Castle in the Harz Mountains in 1939

After 1918, the duchy of Anhalt became a republic as the Free State of Anhalt within the Weimar Republic. Today, it is part of the German state of Saxony-Anhalt. Ballenstedt Castle in the Harz Mountains remained in the possession of the ducal family as a private property. All of the duke's children were born there.

Joachim Ernst joined the ruling Nazi Party in 1939. Later he became a critic of Nazi rule, and in winter 1944 was arrested and spent three months in the Dachau concentration camp.

He welcomed the overthrow of Nazi rule, and remained in the Soviet occupation zone in Germany, believing that his record as an anti-Nazi would protect him. But to his surprise he was arrested on 31 August 1945 by the NKVD during a general round up of 'Junkers' or Prussian landed gentry. His entire 20,000 hectare estate was seized. He died in the NKVD special camp Nr. 2 (the former Buchenwald concentration camp) near Weimar on 18 February 1947.

Following his death, the headship of the Ducal House of Anhalt was disputed between his elder son, Prince Friedrich, and brother Prince Eugen.

== Marriages and children ==
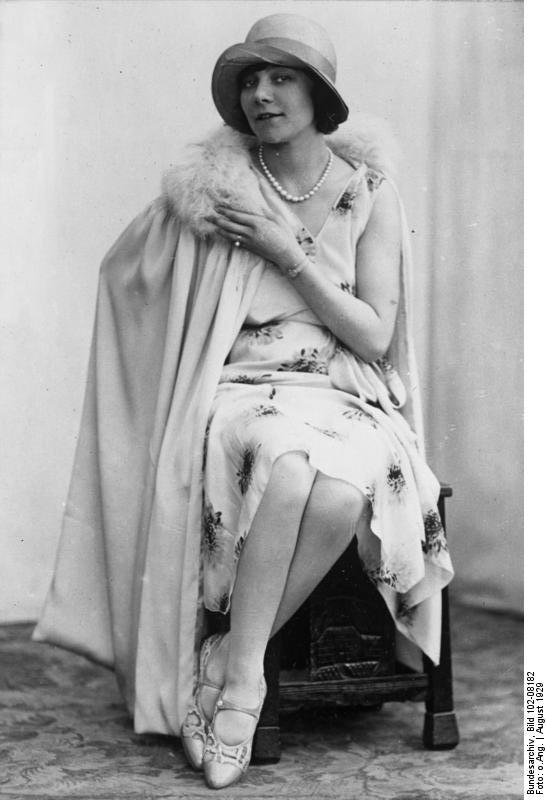
Elisabeth Strickrodt in August 1929

In Ballenstedt Castle on 3 March 1927, Joachim Ernst married firstly Elisabeth Strickrodt (Plauen, 3 September 1903 – Berlin-Zehlendorf, 5 January 1971), a daughter of an opera singer. She was created Countess of Askanien, but they were divorced in 1929, without issue.

In Ballenstedt Castle on 15 October 1929, Joachim Ernst married secondly Editha "Edda" Charlotte Wilhelmine Marwitz von Stephani (Düsseldorf, 20 August 1905 – Garmisch-Partenkirchen, 22 February 1986), natural daughter of Wilhelm Horn by Irmgard Klara Franziska Marwitz. She married firstly in 1926 and divorced from Maximilian, Edler von Rogister and was adopted as an adult by Bertha von Stephani, reputedly for a payment of 10,000 marks, in order to improve her social standing. They had five children:

- Marie Antoinette Elisabeth Alexandra Irmgard Edda Charlotte (14 July 1930 – 22 March 1993), married firstly 1957 (div. 1968) Karl-Heinz Guttmann and had one son, and married secondly 1974 (div. 1976) Max Riederer.
  - Joachim Ernst Guttmann (b. 1963), who married in 2006 Bettina Pahn. They had one child:
    - Leonhardt Held (b. 31 July 2008)
- Anna Luise Marie Friederike Elisabeth Alice (26 March 1933 – 1 November 2003), married 1966 (div. 1970) Thomas Birch (b. 27 September 1927, New York City). They have one son:
  - James Anhalt-Birch (b. 12 April 1968, New York City).
- Leopold Friedrich Franz Sieghard Hubertus Erdmann (11 April 1938 – 9 October 1963).
- Edda Adelheid Antoinette Emma Elisabeth (born 30 January 1940), married 1974 Albert Darboven.
- Eduard Julius Ernst August Erdmann (born 3 December 1941), married 1980 (div. 2014) Corinne Krönlein.

== Honours and awards ==
=== Dynastic honours ===
House of Ascania

- Sovereign Knight Grand Cross with Collar of the Ducal Order of Albert the Bear.

Joachim Ernst, Duke of Anhalt House of Ascania Born: 11 January 1901 Died: 18 February 1947
Regnal titles
Preceded by Eduard	Duke of Anhalt; 13 September – 12 November 1918	Vacant Monarchy abolished
Honorary titles
Preceded by Eduard	Grand Master of the Order of Albert the Bear; 13 September 1918 – 18 February 1947	Succeeded by Friedrich
Titles in pretence
Loss of title Republic declared	— TITULAR — Duke of Anhalt; 12 November 1918 - 18 February 1947	Succeeded by Friedrich
