= Prince Moritz =

Prince Moritz may refer to:

- Prince Moritz of Anhalt-Dessau (1712–1760)
- Moritz, Landgrave of Hesse (1926–2013)
- Prince Moritz of the Princely Family of Liechtenstein
- Prince Moritz of Saxe-Altenburg (1829–1907)

== See also ==
- Georg Moritz, Hereditary Prince of Saxe-Altenburg (1900–1991)
- Prince Maurice (disambiguation)
- Prince Maurits (disambiguation)
