= Peter Erler =

German historian

Peter Erler (born 10 April 1961 in Weißenfels) is a German historian. The focus of his professional research is on the history of German emigrants in the Soviet Union, Soviet internment camps in Germany, together with political developments more generally in the Soviet occupation zone (1945–1949) and the German Democratic Republic (1949–1990).

Between 1980 and 1985 Peter Erler studied history and pedagogy at the Kuban State University, Krasnodar in the Soviet Union. Since 1992 he has worked with both the Forschungsverbund SED-Staat, a department at the Free University of Berlin, established in 1992 to perform research on "the external and internal pre-conditions for the forty year existence of a second German Dictatorship" and the Berlin-Hohenschönhausen Memorial Museum. He is also a member of the editorial staff of the newspaper of the Forschungsverbund.
