= Order of Henry the Lion =

Duchy of Brunswick order (1834–1918)

House Order of Henry the Lion
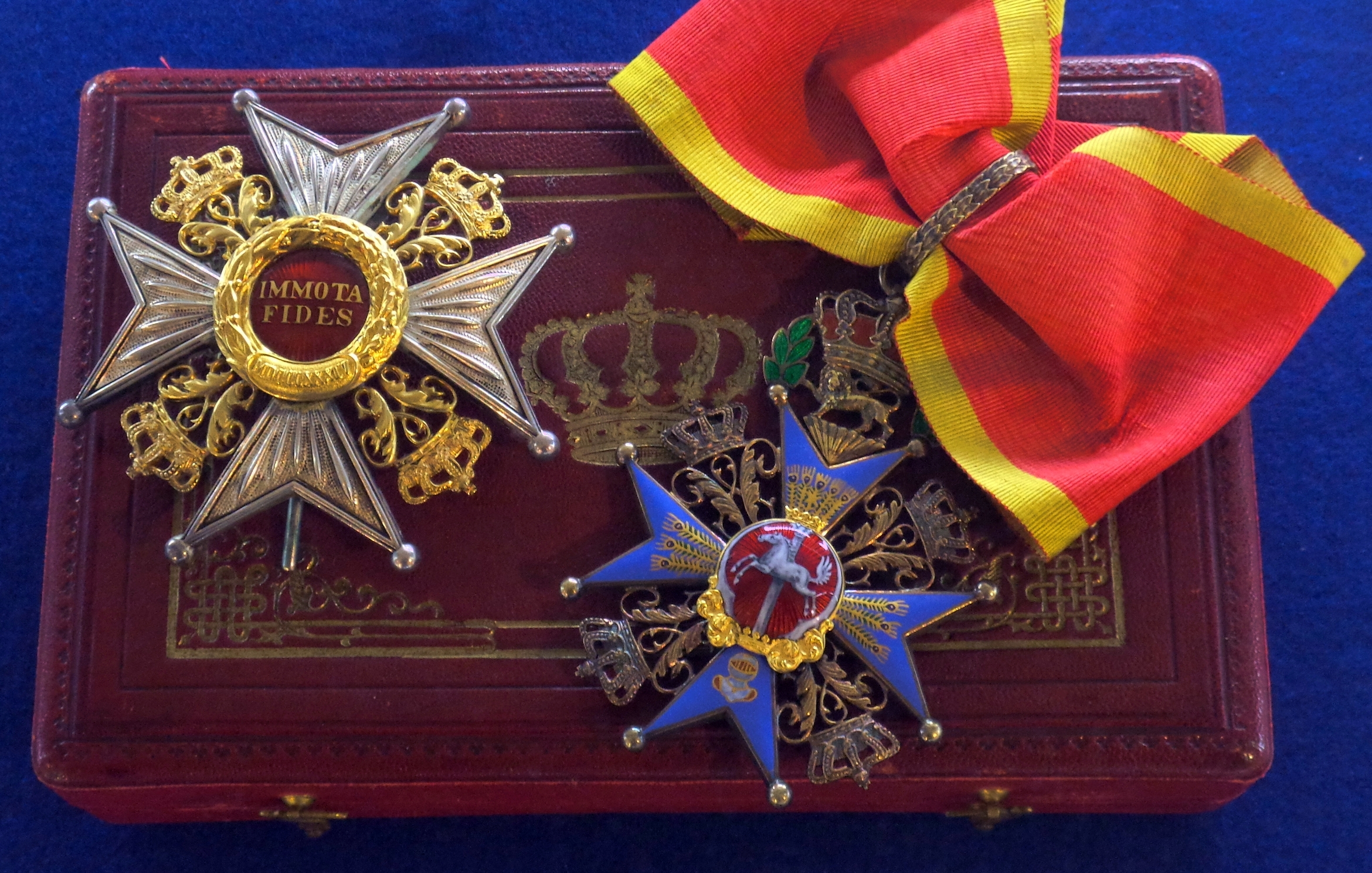
- Insignia of a Grand Commander grade set of the Order of Henry the Lion

Awarded by the Duke of Brunswick
- Type: Order
- Motto: IMMOTA FIDES (in Latin)
- Status: Dynastic Order
- Grades: Five

Statistics
- First induction: 1834
- Last induction: 1918
- Total inductees: 14,124

The House Order of Henry the Lion In German: Hausorden Heinrichs des Löwen, was the House Order of the Duchy of Brunswick. It was instituted by William VIII, Duke of Brunswick on 25 April 1834. The ribbon of the Order was red with yellow edges. It had five grades: Grand Cross, Grand Commander with Sash, Commander, Knight 1st Class, Knight 2nd Class, plus Medal of Merit for Science and Arts, the Cross of Merit and the Medal of Honour. The Order was named in honour of Henry the Lion, who remains a popular figure to this day.

== Order Grades ==
When the Order was founded in 1834 it was originally established with just four main classes and also an affiliated Cross of Merit:

- Grand Cross
- Commander 1st class
- Commander 2nd class
- Knight
- Cross of Merit 1st and 2nd class

When the Franco-Prussian War broke out in 1870, swords were introduced to all classes so the order could also act as an award for war merit. These swords were attached under the bottom arm of the blue cross, and on the breast star on grades this was applicable. On March 8, 1877, the Duke decreed that the knights class would be divided into first and second class grades. In 1903 the form order used to set up a silver medal that was also attached to the order. In 1908 a first class was introduced. There was also the officer's cross, as well as a fourth class added and the badge of honour divided into two classes - silver and bronze - from this point on. One year later there were changes regarding the awarding of swords. This was now awarded for war merit crossing the center shield, and in addition, the swords were introduced over the cross. Awards were made to holders of a higher class if they had already been awarded a lower class with swords for war merit. Until the end of the monarchy in November 1918, the medal was awarded in the following order of precedence:

- Grand Cross (with collar; BrH.G.Kr.)
- 1st class (BrH1)
- Commander 1st and 2nd class (BrH2a and BrH2b)
- Officer's Cross (BrH2c)
- Knights 1st and 2nd class (BrH3a and BrH3b)
- 4th class (BrH4)
- Cross of Merit 1st and 2nd class (BrH5a and BrH5b)
- Badges of honour 1st and 2nd class (BrE1 and BrE2)

== Insignia design ==
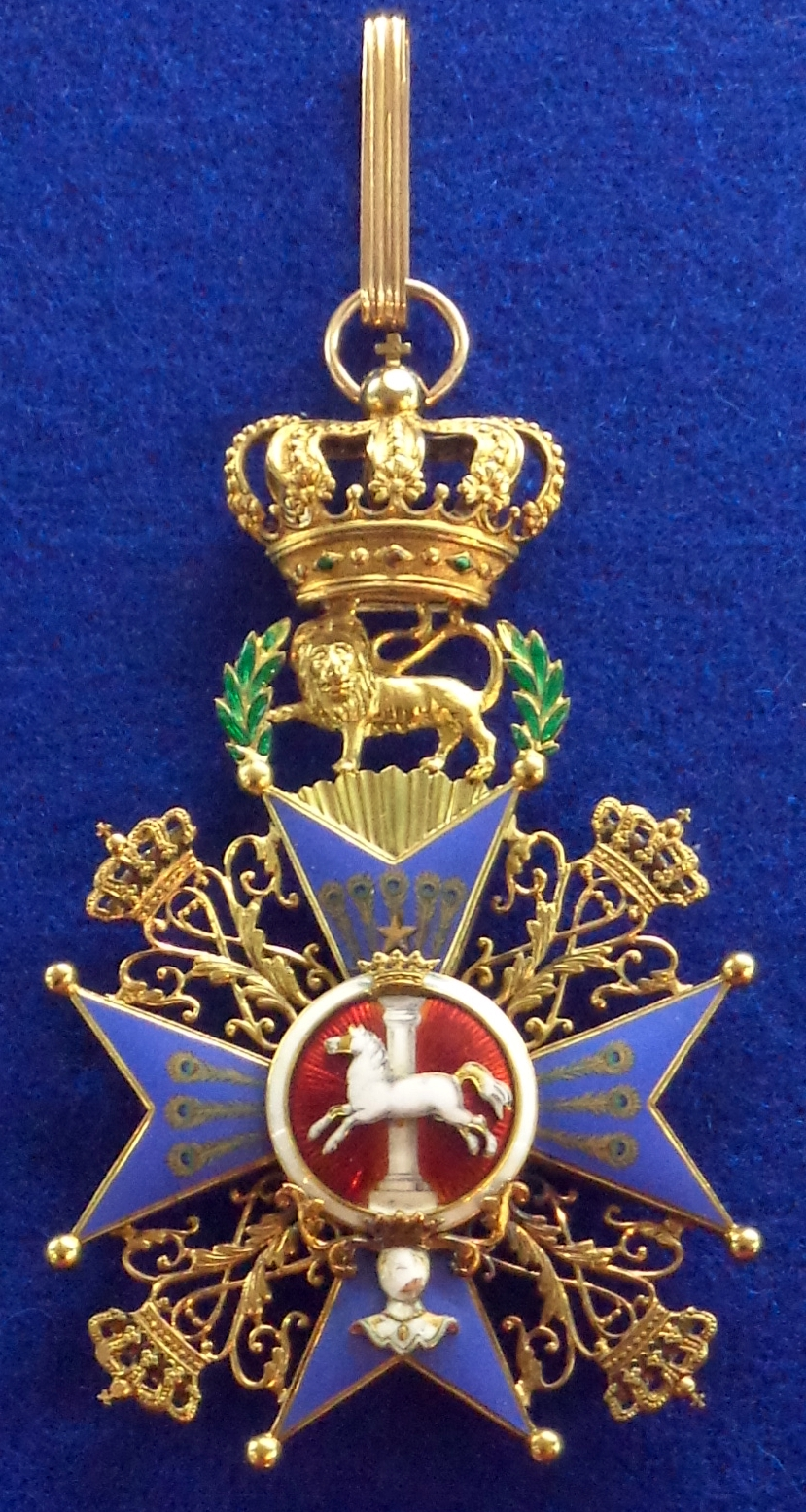
Badge of the Order (Commanders class)

The badge of the order is a golden, four-armed eight-pointed, light blue enamelled St. John's Cross with a red, blasted central shield on which the crowned column with the jumping Saxon steed and on the wings of the helmet and the peacock feathers of the coat of arms are attached.

A lion connects the crown and cross, between the wings there are crowned “W” for the founder of the order Duke Wilhelm. The motto IMMOTA FIDES (unshakable loyalty) is written on the lapel of the middle shield with the foundation's Roman date MDCCCXXXIV all around.

In contrast to all other classes, the cross of the knights II class is made of silver. The fourth class is also made of silver and is only enamelled in the central medallion.

The Cross of Merit of both classes is a high cross with a medallion attached and the crowned initial of the founder "W" can be seen in it. On the arms of the cross is the motto of the order: IM / MO / TA / FIDES. A green enamelled oak wreath also runs between the cross arms of the 1st class .

The badge of honour is a round medal, with the first class in silver and the second class in bronze. In the obverse is the founders "W" initial, enclosed by a wreath of oak leaves and surmounted by a crown. On the reverse the two-line order motto already described, and above it is a six-pointed star while below are two crossed oak branches.

The breast star of the Grand Cross was a silver eight-pointed star with a stylised version of the blue enamelled cross with a central red medallion bearing the orders motto, and a crowned gold "W" in the very centre. The breast star for the Grand Commander is different, made up of a silver representation of the orders badge, with four golden crowned "W"s between each of the four arms. The central medallion is a made up of a red enamelled disk featuring the orders motto in gold, surrounded by a golden wreath.

== Wearing method ==
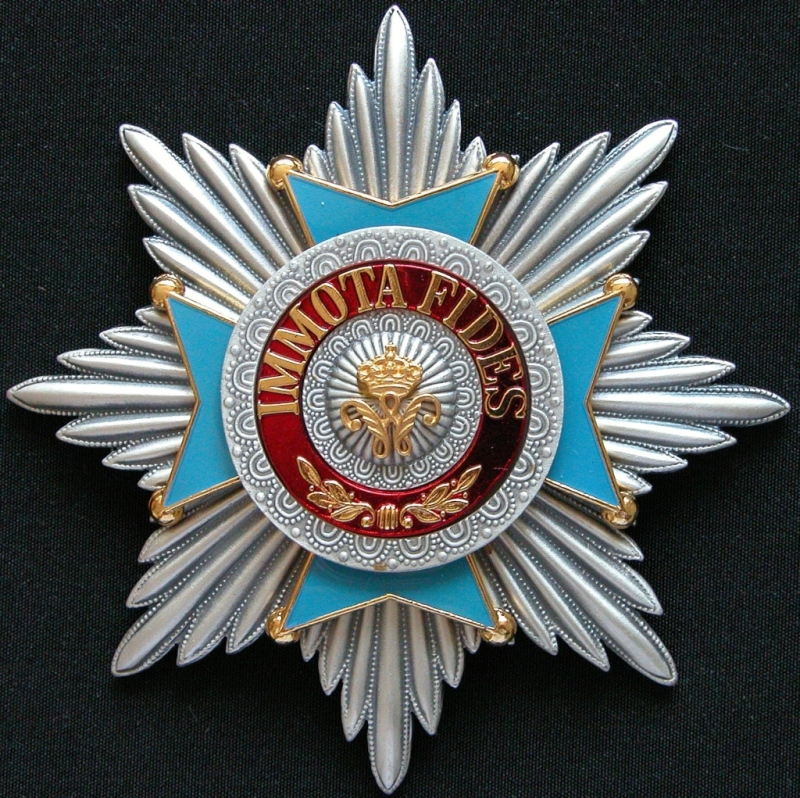
Breast star of the Grand Cross class

The Grand Cross class was carried on a red and yellow sash, worn from the left shoulder and worn with the Grand Cross breast star. On special occasions the badge of the order could also be worn from the collar of the order. The collar was a special class of the Grand Cross and it is not clear if everyone awarded the Grand Cross also received the collar.

The Grand Commander class was also worn on a sash like the Grand Cross, but a different style, but also sometimes on a neck ribbon like the commander class. This grade also came with the Grand Commander class breast star, which was different in design from that of the Grand Cross.

The Commander II class was worn, suspended from a ribbon around the neck and did not come with a breast star.

The officer's cross is a plug-in cross which, like the rest of the classes of the order, was worn on the left side of the chest.

The knights class is worn on a ribbon attached to the left side of the chest.

All versions of the decoration are carried on a crimson ribbon with yellow edges in different sizes according to the relevant classes.

== Recipients ==
The following award numbers can be determined from the registration lists of the Lower Saxony State Archives:

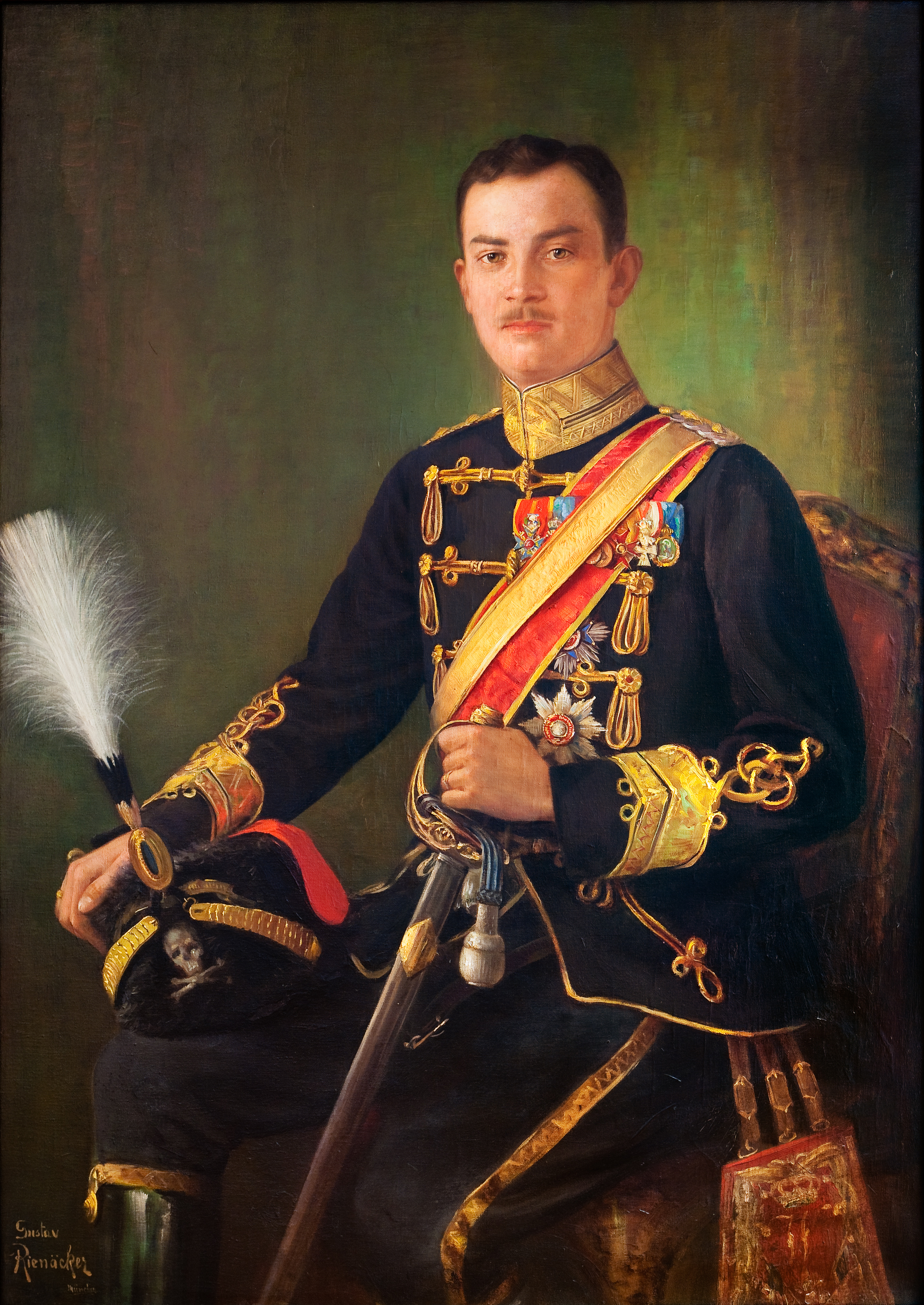
Ernest August, Duke of Brunswick und Lüneburg, wearing the Grand Cross of the Order

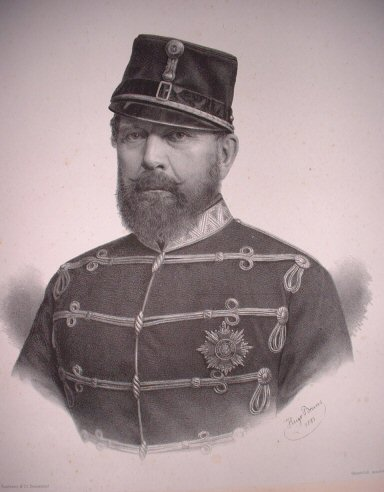
William VIII of Brunswick, founder of the order.

Order class	1834-1858	1859-1879	1880-1911	1912-1918	total
Grand Cross	121	72	185	43	421
Grand Cross (with swords under the cross)		9	25		34
Grand Cross (with Swords)				2	2
Grand Cross (with swords on the ring)		1	12		13
1st class			58	60	118
1st class (with swords on the ring)			2		2
Commander 1st class	95	70	238	65	468
Commander 1st class (with swords under the cross)		12	12	1	25
Commander 1st class (with swords)				2	2
Commander 1st class (with swords on the ring)		9	15	1	25
Commander II class	131	130	443	101	805
Commander II class (with swords under the cross)		22	36		58
Commander II class (with swords)			1	1	2
Commander II class (with swords on the ring)		3	17	5	25
Officer's Cross			126	100	226
Officer's Cross (with Golden Swords)			1	1	2
Officer's Cross (with Silver swords)			3		3
Knight's Cross 1st class	329	323	753	31	1,436
Knight's Cross 1st class (with swords under the cross)		92	43		135
Knight's Cross 1st class (with swords)			1	1	2
Knight's Cross 1st class (with swords on the ring)			21	1	22
Knight's Cross II. class		38	1,372	286	1,696
Knight's Cross II. class (with swords under the cross)		2	77		79
Knight's Cross II. class (with swords)			2	6	8
Knight's Cross II. class (with swords on the ring)			1		1
IV class			268	256	524
IV class (with swords)			1		1
Golden Cross of Merit	80	183	1,211	344	1,818
Golden Cross of Merit (with Swords)			10	9	19
Silver Cross of Merit	167	412	2,379	451	3,409
Silver Cross of Merit (with Swords)			140	3	143
Decoration of honour 1st class					1,804
Decoration of honour II. class					796

Four copies of the Grand Cross were made, studded with diamonds were awarded for exceptionally special merits. The first was made in 1835 for 1,200 guilders, the second in 1837 for 963 pounds, and the third and fourth for 7,000 gold marks each.

Known recipients

- see: Bearer of the Order of Henry the Lion
- Duke Adolf Friedrich of Mecklenburg
- Adolphus Frederick V, Grand Duke of Mecklenburg-Strelitz
- Prince Albert of Prussia (1809–1872)
- Prince Albert of Prussia (1837–1906)
- Archduke Albrecht, Duke of Teschen
- Alexander of Battenberg
- Prince Alexander of Hesse and by Rhine
- Prince Aribert of Anhalt
- Prince Arthur, Duke of Connaught and Strathearn
- Prince August of Württemberg
- Prince Augustus of Prussia
- Prince Bernhard of Saxe-Weimar-Eisenach (1792–1862)
- Theobald von Bethmann Hollweg
- Otto von Bismarck
- Bernhard von Bülow
- Carol I of Romania
- Charles Alexander, Grand Duke of Saxe-Weimar-Eisenach
- Charles Augustus, Hereditary Grand Duke of Saxe-Weimar-Eisenach (1844–1894)
- Prince Charles of Prussia
- Chulalongkorn
- Constantine I of Greece
- Eduard, Duke of Anhalt
- Ernest Augustus, Duke of Brunswick
- Prince Ernest Augustus, 3rd Duke of Cumberland and Teviotdale
- Ernest Louis, Grand Duke of Hesse
- Ernst I, Duke of Saxe-Altenburg
- Ernst II, Duke of Saxe-Altenburg
- Ernest II, Duke of Saxe-Coburg and Gotha
- Franz Joseph I of Austria
- Archduke Franz Karl of Austria
- Frederick II, Grand Duke of Baden
- Frederick Augustus II, Grand Duke of Oldenburg
- Frederick Francis II, Grand Duke of Mecklenburg-Schwerin
- Frederick I, Duke of Anhalt
- Frederick I, Grand Duke of Baden
- Frederick III, German Emperor
- Frederick William IV of Prussia
- Frederick William, Grand Duke of Mecklenburg-Strelitz
- Prince Friedrich of Saxe-Meiningen
- Prince Friedrich Karl of Prussia (1828–1885)
- Prince Friedrich Leopold of Prussia
- Georg, Prince of Schaumburg-Lippe
- George I of Greece
- George V of Hanover
- George, King of Saxony
- Prince George, Duke of Cambridge
- Erich von Gündell
- Günther Victor, Prince of Schwarzburg
- Gustav, Prince of Vasa
- Wilhelm von Hahnke
- Prince Heinrich of Hesse and by Rhine
- Duke Henry of Mecklenburg-Schwerin
- Prince Henry of Prussia (1862–1929)
- Dietrich von Hülsen-Haeseler
- Prince Joachim of Prussia
- Duke John Albert of Mecklenburg
- Prince Julius of Schleswig-Holstein-Sonderburg-Glücksburg
- Archduke Karl Ludwig of Austria
- Karl Theodor, Duke in Bavaria
- Grand Duke Kirill Vladimirovich of Russia
- Maximilian von Laffert
- Prince Leopold of Bavaria
- Fritz von Loßberg
- Louis IV, Grand Duke of Hesse
- Archduke Ludwig Viktor of Austria
- Luitpold, Prince Regent of Bavaria
- Edwin Freiherr von Manteuffel
- Maximilian I of Mexico
- Duke Maximilian Emanuel in Bavaria
- Duke William of Mecklenburg-Schwerin
- Emperor Meiji
- Klemens von Metternich
- Alfred Meyer-Waldeck
- Milan I of Serbia
- Helmuth von Moltke the Elder
- Prince Moritz of Saxe-Altenburg
- Prince Nikolaus Wilhelm of Nassau
- August Ludwig von Nostitz
- Duke Philipp of Württemberg
- Philipp, Prince of Eulenburg
- Hans von Plessen
- Prince Friedrich Wilhelm of Prussia
- Rupprecht, Crown Prince of Bavaria
- Prince William of Schaumburg-Lippe
- Eberhard Graf von Schmettow
- Archduke Stephen of Austria (Palatine of Hungary)
- Otto Graf zu Stolberg-Wernigerode
- Alfred von Tirpitz
- Prince Valdemar of Denmark
- Alfred von Waldersee
- Wilhelm II, German Emperor
- Wilhelm, German Crown Prince
- William I of Württemberg
- William I, German Emperor
- William II of Württemberg
- William Ernest, Grand Duke of Saxe-Weimar-Eisenach
- William IV, Grand Duke of Luxembourg
- Duke William of Württemberg
- William, Duke of Brunswick
- William, Prince of Hohenzollern
- Friedrich Graf von Wrangel
- Paku Alam VIII, Prince of Pakualaman

== Gallery ==
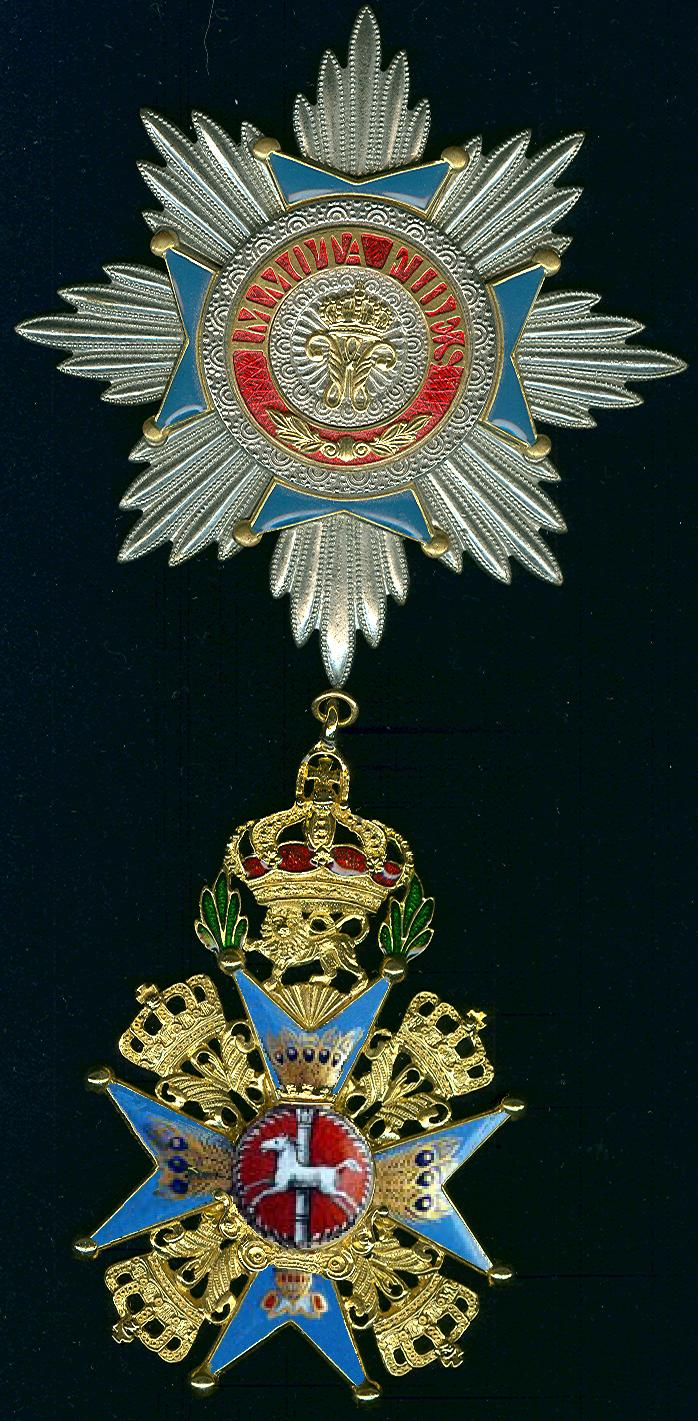
Badge and star of the Grand Cross grade

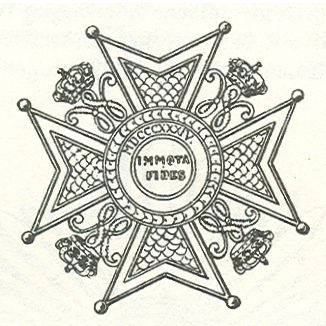
Design of the Grand Commanders grade star

Design of the collar of the order

Coat of Arms of the Duchy of Brunswick showing the collar of the order at the bottom

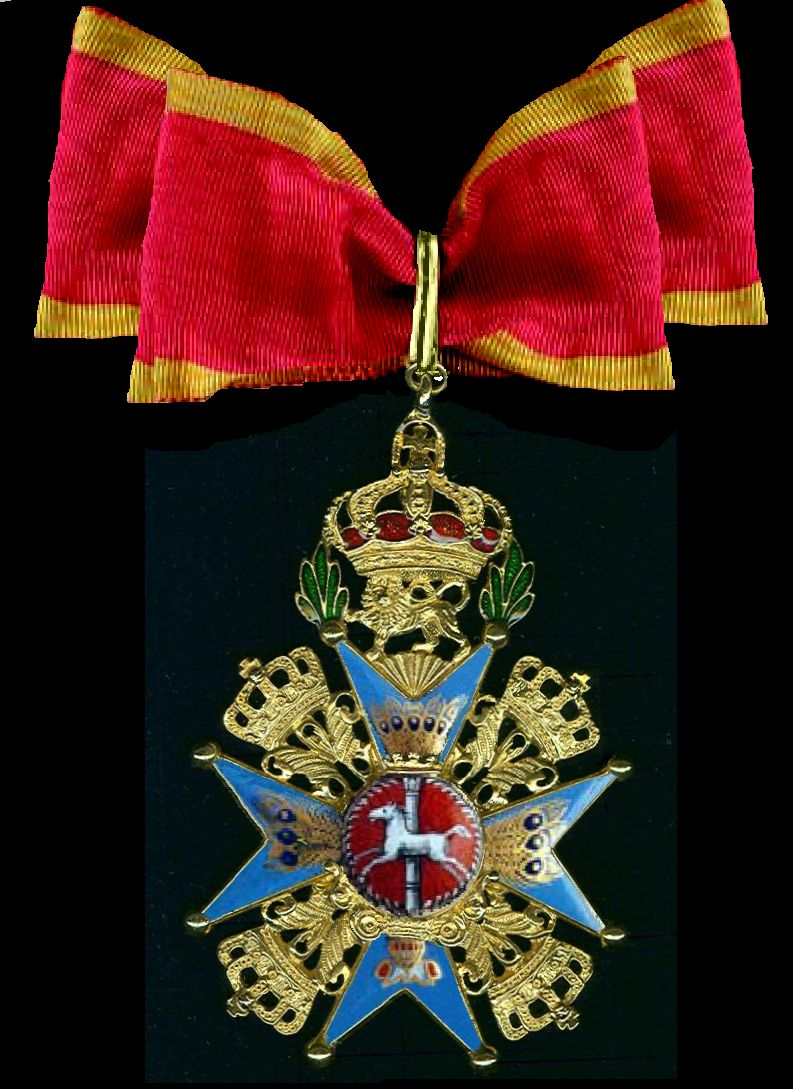
Commanders class of the order

== See also ==
- Henry the Lion
