= Georg Moritz, Hereditary Prince of Saxe-Altenburg =

Georg Moritz
- Hereditary Prince of Saxe-Altenburg
- Georg Moritz in 1914

Head of the House of Saxe-Altenburg
- Reign: 22 March 1955 – 13 February 1991
- Predecessor: Ernst II
- Born: 13 May 1900; Potsdam, Prussia
- Died: 13 February 1991 (aged 90); Rendsburg, Germany
Names
- Wilhelm Georg Moritz Ernst Albert Frederick Karl Konstantin Eduard Max Erbprinz von Sachsen-Altenburg
- House: House of Saxe-Altenburg
- Father: Ernst II, Duke of Saxe-Altenburg
- Mother: Princess Adelaide of Schaumburg-Lippe

George Moritz, Hereditary Prince of Saxe-Altenburg (William George Moritz Ernest Albert Frederick Charles Constantine Edward Maximilian; 13 May 1900 – 13 February 1991), was the last head of the ducal house of Saxe-Altenburg and nominal Duke of Saxe-Altenburg. He devoted much of his life to promote anthroposophy.

== Life ==
Born in Potsdam, Prussia, he was the eldest son of Prince Ernest of Saxe-Altenburg and Princess Adelaide of Schaumburg-Lippe, his first wife. At the time of his birth, his father, then the third-in-line to succeed the Ducal throne, lived with his wife in Prussia as a Captain and commander of the 1st Regiment of Foot Guards in Potsdam. George Moritz and his three siblings were all born and lived there.

The death of his father Prince Moritz on 13 May 1907, made Prince Ernest the Hereditary Prince of Saxe-Altenburg, and nine months later (7 February 1908) with the death of his uncle Duke Ernest I he became in the new ruler of the Duchy of Saxe-Altenburg as Ernest II. Then, the whole family moved from Potsdam to Altenburg. George Moritz, now Hereditary Prince, lived at the Ducal court until March 1913, when his father sent him to Dresden to continue his education at the King Georg High School (German: König-Georg-Gymnasium); in addition to this, he received his military training at the 8th Thuringian Infantry Regiment N°153.

After Germany lost World War I, Duke Ernest II was forced to abdicate the government of the Duchy on 13 November 1918, and spent the rest of his life like a private citizen. Two years later (17 January 1920) the divorce between George Moritz' parents was formally pronounced.

Even in his youth, George Moritz was interested in anthroposophy. In the early 1930s, his meeting with Siegfried Pickert was a turning point in his life. His life after that point centered around Hamborn Castle, where beginning in 1931, he actively taught and promoted anthroposophy. In 1936 he rented the farm near the Castle.

Although the Nazi regime banned anthroposophy, the research with disabled children was allowed to continue in Hamborn until June 1941, thanks to the mediation of George Moritz. He counted on the protection of Rudolf Hess who until 1941 was a supporter of anthroposophy. However, eventually the Gestapo stopped the research and George Moritz, along with the managing director of the institution Adolf Ammerschläger, was placed in protective custody for nine and a half months.

In 1946, George Moritz returned to Hamborn Castle, where he campaigned again for the employees and guests of the convalescent home and especially for those living in the youth boarding school. Among other things, he worked on the board of the local social charity until 1968. He lived modestly in a small apartment in the Castle, surrounded by an extensive library.

When his father died in 1955, George Moritz became the head of the house of Saxe-Altenburg and nominal Duke of Saxe-Altenburg. He never married and his only brother and heir presumptive, Frederick, died also unmarried in 1985.

On 13 February 1991 George Moritz died as a result of pneumonia in Rendsburg hospital. With his death the house of Saxe-Altenburg became extinct, although the family name continued due to the adoption in 1942 of Franz, Count Praschma (1934-2012) by Princess Marie (6 June 1888 - 12 November 1947), second daughter of Prince Albert of Saxe-Altenburg.

The representation of the Ducal house was merged with that of Saxe-Weimar-Eisenach.

George Moritz was the godfather of German journalist Rolf Seelmann-Eggebert.

== Ancestry ==
Ancestors of Georg Moritz, Hereditary Prince of Saxe-Altenburg

8. Georg, Duke of Saxe-Altenburg
4. Prince Moritz of Saxe-Altenburg
9. Duchess Marie Louise of Mecklenburg-Schwerin
2. Ernst II, Duke of Saxe-Altenburg
10. Bernhard II, Duke of Saxe-Meiningen
5. Princess Augusta of Saxe-Meiningen
11. Marie Fredericka of Hesse-Kassel
1. Georg Moritz, Hereditary Prince of Saxe-Altenburg
12. George William, Prince of Schaumburg-Lippe
6. Prince William of Schaumburg-Lippe
13. Princess Ida of Waldeck and Pyrmont
3. Princess Adelaide of Schaumburg-Lippe
14. Prince Frederick Augustus of Anhalt-Dessau
7. Princess Bathildis of Anhalt-Dessau
15. Princess Marie Luise Charlotte of Hesse-Kassel

Georg Moritz, Hereditary Prince of Saxe-Altenburg House of Saxe-Altenburg Cadet branch of the House of Wettin Born: 13 May 1900 Died: 13 February 1991
Titles in pretence
Preceded by Ernst II	— TITULAR — Duke of Saxe-Altenburg; 1955–1991; Reason for succession failure: Duchy abolished in 1918	Extinct
