= Eduard Prinz von Anhalt =

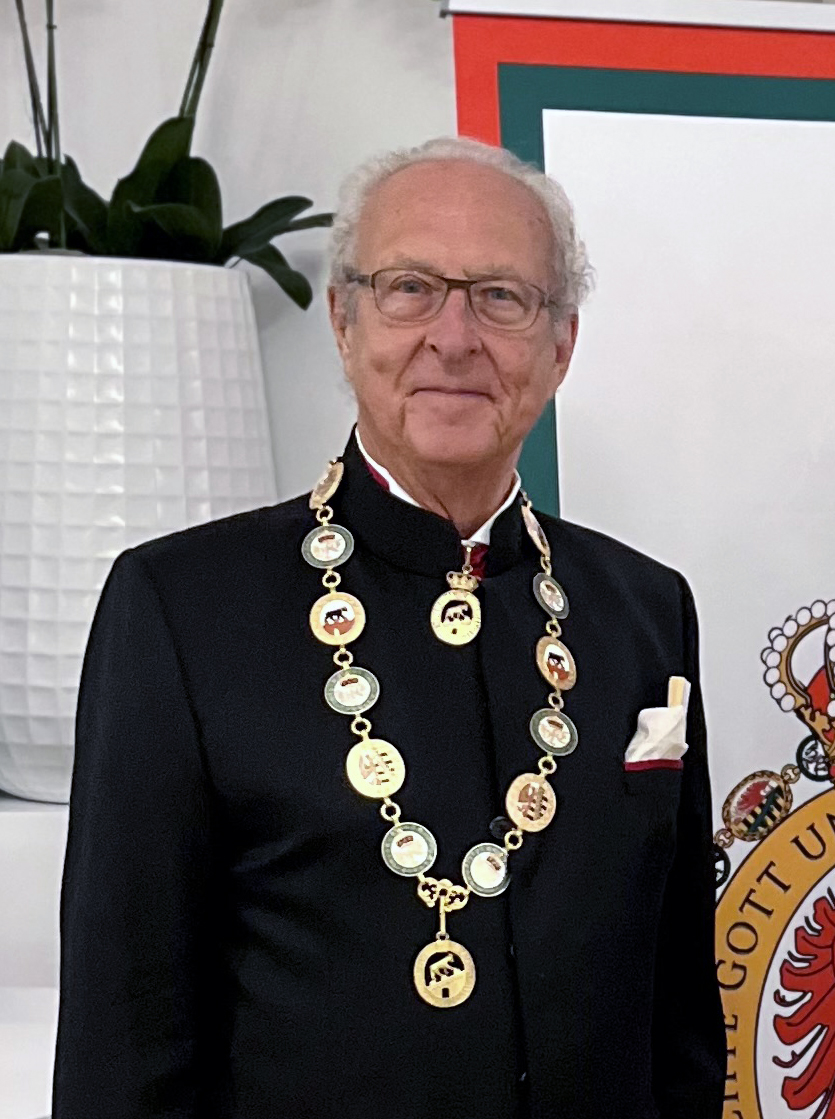
- Prince Eduard in 2023

Head of the House of Ascania
- Period: 9 October 1963 – present
- Predecessor: Friedrich
- Heir apparent: Julia Katharina, Hereditary Princess of Anhalt
- Born: 3 December 1941 (age 84); Ballenstedt, Harz District, Anhalt, Germany
- Spouse: Corinne Krönlein (m. 1980; div. 2014)
- Issue: 3
Names
- Eduard Julius Ernst August Erdmann Prinz von Anhalt
- House: Ascania
- Father: Joachim Ernst, Duke of Anhalt
- Mother: Editha Marwitz von Stephani
- Religion: Lutheranism

Eduard Julius Ernst August Erdmann Prinz von Anhalt (born 3 December 1941), also referred to by the courtesy title Prince Eduard, is the head of the House of Ascania, the family which ruled the Duchy of Anhalt until 1918.

== Life and family ==
Eduard was born at Schloss Ballenstedt in Ballenstedt, in what is now the German state of Saxony-Anhalt, the youngest of the five children of the last reigning duke of Anhalt, Joachim Ernst, and of his second wife, Editha "Edda" Charlotte Wilhelmine Marwitz, who allegedly paid 10,000 marks to Bertha von Stephani to improve her social standing by adult adoption.

On 9 October 1963, Eduard's older brother, Friedrich, died childless in a car crash. Eduard uses the title prince of Anhalt, but is referred to by others as duke of Anhalt. The succession of Eduard and his brother was disputed by their uncle, prince Eugen, who also claimed the headship of house, after the death of duke Joachim Ernst. The death without male issue in 1980 of prince Eugen left prince Eduard as the sole claimant to the headship of the house.

Eduard lived in the United States for several years, working in a number of retail sales positions, before returning to West Germany in 1967. He has been a journalist and columnist for numerous West German magazines. He has also hosted a television programme Adel verpflichet ("Noblesse oblige") for RTL Television. Subsequently, Anhalt became a frequent West German television commentator for royal events.

In 1978, Eduard wrote a book about his family's traditions, Askanische Sagen Über die Entstehung der Deutschen (English: Ascanian legends about the origins of the Germans). A revised and expanded edition of the book with the title Sagenhaftes Askanien: Geschichten und Legenden (English: Incredible Ascania, stories and legends) was published in 2004.

Eduard has served as deputy chairman of the "Société des Amis" of the Almanach de Gotha reboot.

In April 1990, Eduard asserted ownership of the family seat Schloss Ballenstedt, which had been confiscated by the Communist authorities in East Germany, after World War II. He was unsuccessful, and there were lengthy administrative disputes, although relations with the town administration of Ballenstedt subsequently improved.

After a further long legal fight with the town administration, which had insisted on first right of refusal, in May 2000 Eduard managed to purchase, for 400,000 D-Marks, another property of the family which had been requisitioned. This was the small, but historic domed neoclassical hunting lodge, Röhrkopf, built in 1770, which lies within the former park of Schloss Ballenstedt. It has now become the family seat and three holiday-apartments for general rental have been constructed within its garden. Fear of lingering animosity towards the family, including over issues of restitution, inhibited his children from resettling in Anhalt, although after her divorce, his wife bought a home in Dessau and worked to promote the region.

A difficulty for Eduard has been the adult adoptees of his aunt Princess Marie-Auguste of Anhalt. Adopted for what has been presumed to be monetary reasons, and laying claim to be princes of Anhalt, they are estimated to number 35 persons. Outside of Germany, the most notable of the adoptees is Frédéric Prinz von Anhalt (formerly Hans Lichtenberg), the last husband of actress Zsa Zsa Gabor. In 2010, Eduard released a statement restating that such individuals would never be officially recognised by the family as members of the House of Anhalt-Ascania.

Eduard gained international attention in August 2010, when he claimed to have advanced knowledge of the engagement of his distant cousin Prince William of Wales to Catherine Middleton. Although a spokesperson for the British royal family denied Eduard's claim, the engagement was indeed announced a few months later.

== Marriage and children ==
On 21 July 1980, in Munich, Eduard married Corinne Gisa Elisabeth Krönlein (born 19 August 1961, Würzburg), daughter of Günther Krönlein (a relative of Rhenish missionary Johann Georg Krönlein) and wife Anneliese Benz, in a civil ceremony. The couple renewed their vows in a religious ceremony on 7 June 1986 in S-charl, near Scuol, Switzerland, but later divorced in 2014. Eduard and Corinne have three daughters.

== Succession ==
Eduard is the last male of what is considered the "House of Ascania", itself from the Billung dynasty, traced back ultimately to the Count Wichmann (Wychmannus comes) in 811 AD. If Eduard died without male issue, the House would be considered extinct. The male line of Ascanians survives, however, in the Counts von Westarp, descendants of Prince Franz of Anhalt-Bernburg-Schaumburg-Hoym and his morganatic wife Karoline Westarp and the Counts von Waldersee who descend from Count Franz Johann von Waldersee (1763–1823), illegitimate son of Leopold III, Duke of Anhalt-Dessau (1740–1817) and his mistress Eleonore Hofmeyer (1739–1816). In 2010 Eduard modified the House of Anhalt-Ascania Laws, abolishing the Salic or Semi-Salic laws; recognising his first born daughter as his heir; and ruling that gender would in future be irrelevant in determining the line of descent.

== Honours ==
=== Dynastic orders ===
- House of Ascania: Sovereign Knight Grand Cross with Collar of the Ducal Order of Albert the Bear
- Two Sicilian royal family: Bailiff Knight Grand Cross of Justice and Honour with Collar of the Two Sicilian Royal Sacred Military Constantinian Order of Saint George

Eduard Prinz von Anhalt House of Ascania Born: 3 December 1941
Titles in pretence
Preceded by Friedrich	— TITULAR — Duke of Anhalt; 9 October 1963 – present Reason for succession failure: Duchy abolished in 1918	Incumbent
