= Princess Marie-Auguste of Anhalt =

German princess (1898–1983)

Marie Auguste of Anhalt
- Princess Joachim of Prussia
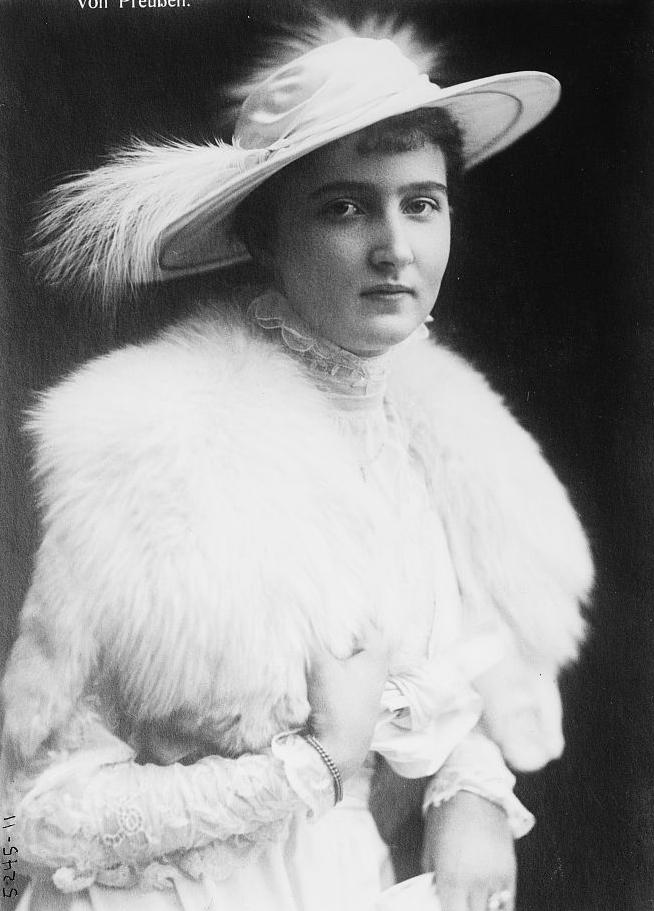
- Born: 10 June 1898; Ballenstedt, Anhalt, Germany
- Died: 22 May 1983 (aged 84); Essen, North Rhine-Westphalia, West Germany
- Spouse: Prince Joachim of Prussia (m. 1916; div. 1919) Johannes-Michael Freiherr von Loën (m. 1926; div. 1935)
- Issue: Prince Karl Franz of Prussia
Names
- German: Marie Auguste Antoinette Friederike Alexandra Hilda Luise
- House: Ascania
- Father: Eduard, Duke of Anhalt
- Mother: Princess Louise Charlotte of Saxe-Altenburg

Princess Marie Auguste of Anhalt (10 June 1898 – 22 May 1983) was the daughter of Eduard, Duke of Anhalt, and his wife, Princess Louise Charlotte of Saxe-Altenburg. She married and divorced a son of Kaiser Wilhelm II, then married and divorced a baron.

== Early life and family ==
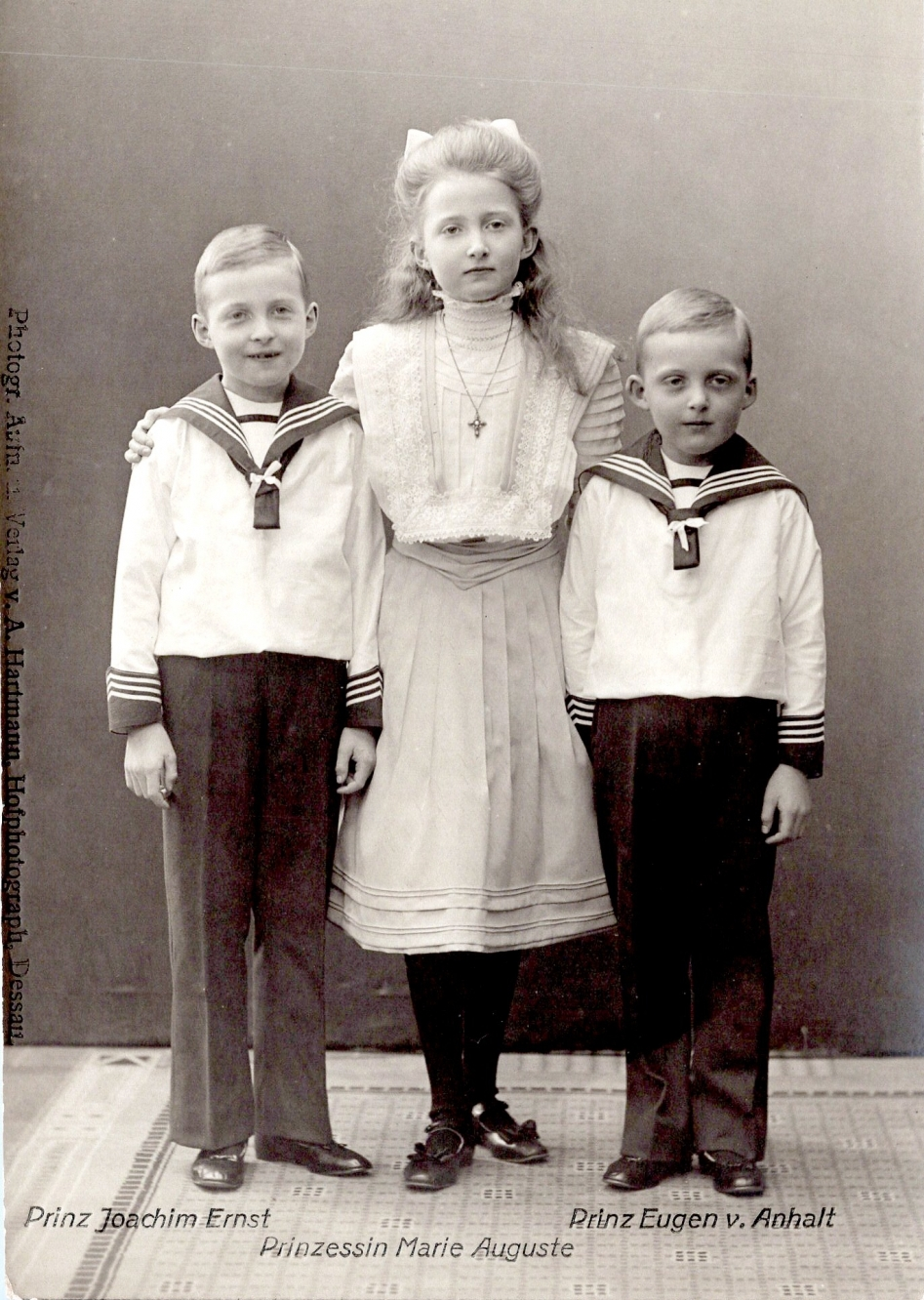
Princess Marie Auguste with her younger brothers Prince Joachim Ernst and Prince Eugen in 1910.

On 10 June 1898, Marie-Auguste was born in Ballenstedt, Anhalt, Germany, to the then Prince Eduard of Anhalt and his wife Princess Louise Charlotte of Saxe-Altenburg. Her father would not succeed his brother Frederick II until 1918, the year he also died. Her paternal grandparents were Frederick I, Duke of Anhalt and Princess Antoinette of Saxe-Altenburg. Her maternal grandparents were Prince Moritz of Saxe-Altenburg and Princess Augusta of Saxe-Meiningen.

Marie-Auguste was raised in Dessau, the capital of the duchy of Anhalt. She had five siblings, but her elder sister Friederike and brother Leopold died while infants. Marie-Auguste was an elder sister of Prince Joachim Ernst, who would become the last Duke of Anhalt for a few months in 1918.

== First marriage and divorce ==
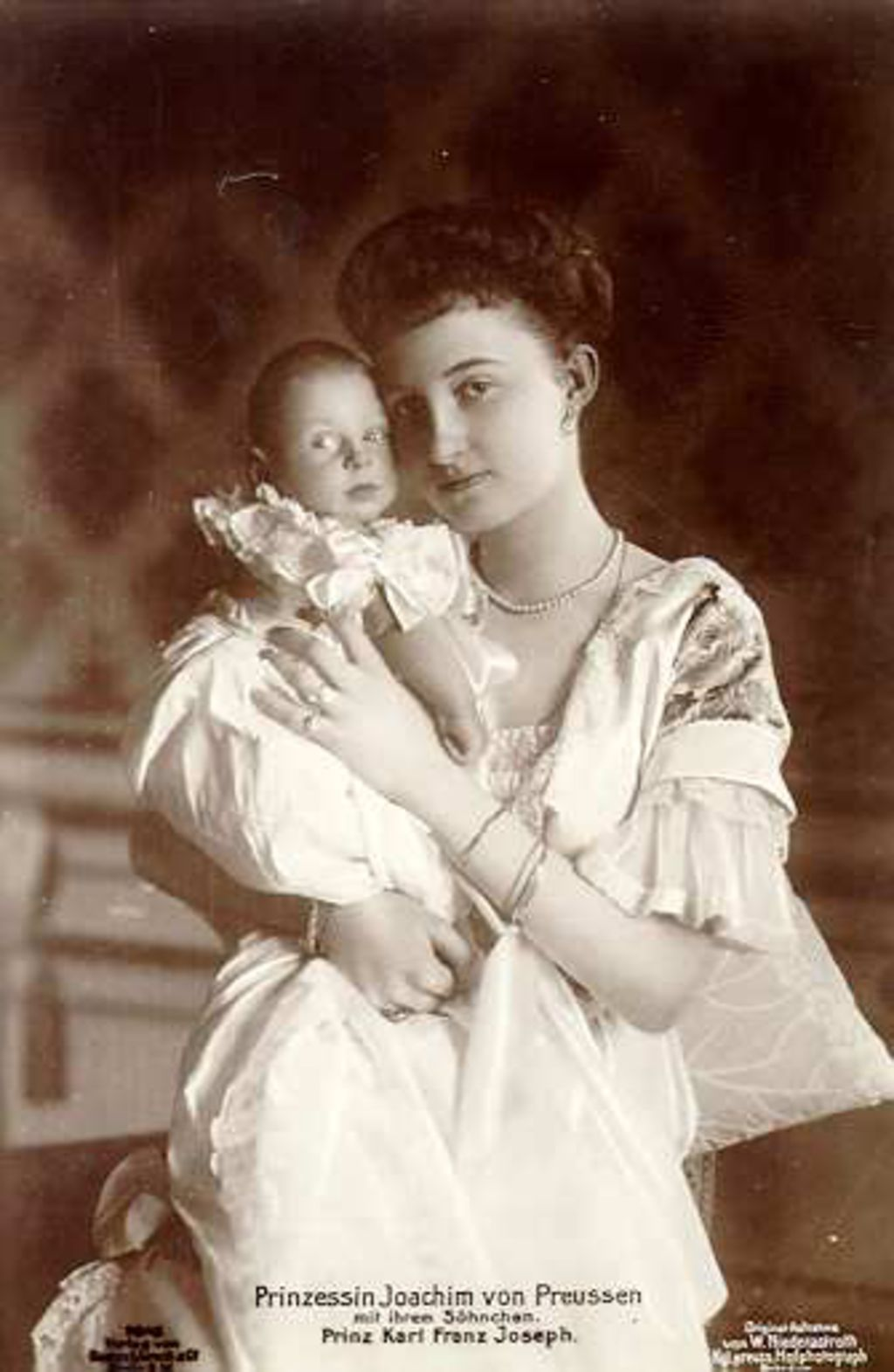
Marie-Auguste with her son.

On 11 March 1916 in Berlin, Marie-Auguste married Prince Joachim of Prussia, the youngest son of German Emperor Wilhelm II, by his first wife, Augusta Victoria of Schleswig-Holstein. Marie-Auguste and Joachim, who was Wilhelm's last unmarried child, had been officially engaged since 14 October of the previous year. The wedding was celebrated at Bellevue Palace, and was attended by Joachim's father and mother Empress Augusta Viktoria, the Duke and Duchess of Anhalt, as well as other relatives. They had a simple Lutheran ceremony.

The couple had one son, Prince Karl Franz Josef Wilhelm Friedrich Eduard Paul (15 December 1916 in Potsdam – 23 January 1975 in Arica, Chile). Their grandson, Prince Franz Wilhelm, married Maria Vladimirovna of Russia, a pretender to the Imperial Russian throne.

The couple were divorced soon after the end of WWI. The direct causes of the divorce are not really known to the public, only that there had been no previous report of marital troubles before the divorce was announced. According to another report, Marie-Auguste had previously abandoned her husband and child to run away with another man, had been forcibly brought back home on the orders of the Kaiser, and had filed for divorce as soon as the war ended, when she saw that her husband's family were at their lowest ebb. Regardless of the reasons, this event was one of the main reasons why Prince Joachim died by suicide only weeks after the divorce was finalized.

== After the divorce ==
On 18 July 1920, very shortly after the divorce, Joachim shot himself in Potsdam. One source reports that he had been in financial straits and suffered from "great mental depression". His own brother Prince Eitel Friedrich of Prussia commented that he suffered from "a fit of excessive dementia".

After Joachim's suicide, Marie-Auguste's son Karl Franz was taken into the custody of his paternal uncle Prince Eitel Friedrich. As the acting head of the House of Hohenzollern, he claimed this right, due to the fact that the Emperor Wilhelm had issued an edict placing Hohenzollern powers in Eitel Friedrich's hands. This action was later declared to have been unlawful, and in 1921, Marie-Auguste was given full custody of her son, despite the fact that she had previously run away from her husband and despite numerous servants having testified against her, with Eitel Friedrich's counsel arguing that Marie-Auguste was unfit to have custody of Karl Franz. However, she appeared in court and pleaded that she was heartbroken, which may have helped to win the case for her. In 1922, Marie-Auguste sued her former father-in-law for the financial support that had been promised in the marriage contract between her and Prince Joachim. Wilhelm's advocate argued that the laws of the House of Hohenzollern were no longer in force, so there was no longer a financial obligation to support her.

== Second marriage and divorce ==
On 27 September 1926, she married Johannes-Michael Freiherr von Loën (b. 1902), a childhood friend. They were divorced in 1935, and Marie-Auguste reverted to her maiden name. On 1 May 1934, she joined the Nazi Party.

In 1980, Princess Marie-Auguste legally adopted the businessman Hans Lichtenberg, who subsequently took the name Frédéric Prinz von Anhalt. According to Prinz von Anhalt, who thereafter proceeded to sell knighthoods and marriages related to his new station, he gave her $4,000 a month (German sources say 2,000 Deutsche Mark a month) in financial support.

== Death ==
Princess Marie-Auguste died on 22 May 1983 at Essen, North Rhine-Westphalia, West Germany.

== Ancestry ==
Ancestors of Princess Marie-Auguste of Anhalt

16. Frederick, Hereditary Prince of Anhalt-Dessau
8. Leopold IV, Duke of Anhalt
17. Landgravine Amalie of Hesse-Homburg
4. Frederick I, Duke of Anhalt
18. Prince Louis Charles of Prussia
9. Princess Frederica of Prussia, Duchess of Anhalt-Dessau
19. Frederica of Mecklenburg-Strelitz
2. Eduard, Duke of Anhalt
20. Frederick, Duke of Saxe-Altenburg
10. Prince Eduard of Saxe-Altenburg
21. Duchess Charlotte Georgine of Mecklenburg-Strelitz
5. Antoinette of Saxe-Altenburg
22. Charles, Prince of Hohenzollern-Sigmaringen
11. Princess Amalie of Hohenzollern-Sigmaringen
23. Princess Marie Antoinette Murat
1. Marie-Auguste of Anhalt
24. Frederick, Duke of Saxe-Altenburg (= 20)
12. Georg, Duke of Saxe-Altenburg
25. Duchess Charlotte Georgine of Mecklenburg-Strelitz (= 21)
6. Prince Moritz of Saxe-Altenburg
26. Frederick Louis, Hereditary Grand Duke of Mecklenburg-Schwerin
13. Duchess Marie Louise of Mecklenburg-Schwerin
27. Grand Duchess Elena Pavlovna of Russia
3. Princess Louise Charlotte of Saxe-Altenburg
28. George I, Duke of Saxe-Meiningen
14. Bernhard II, Duke of Saxe-Meiningen
29. Luise Eleonore of Hohenlohe-Langenburg
7. Princess Augusta of Saxe-Meiningen
30. William II, Elector of Hesse
15. Princess Marie Frederica of Hesse-Kassel
31. Princess Augusta of Prussia
