= Princess Louise Charlotte of Saxe-Altenburg =

German noblewoman and princess

Princess Louise Charlotte
- Princess Edward of Anhalt
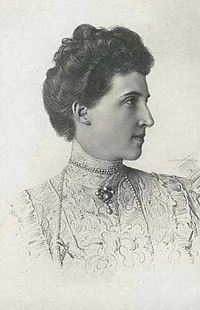
- Born: 11 August 1873; Altenburg
- Died: 14 April 1953 (aged 79); Altenburg
- Spouse: Prince Eduard of Anhalt (m. 1895; div. 1918)
- Issue: Princess Friederike; Prince Leopold; Princess Marie-Auguste; Joachim Ernst, Duke of Anhalt; Prince Eugen; Prince Wolfgang
Names
- Marie Agnes Louise Charlotte
- House: Saxe-Altenburg
- Father: Prince Moritz of Saxe-Altenburg
- Mother: Princess Augusta of Saxe-Meiningen

Princess Louise Charlotte of Saxe-Altenburg (Marie Agnes Louise Charlotte; 11 August 1873 – 14 April 1953) was a German noblewoman. She was a princess of Saxe-Altenburg by birth and a Princess of Anhalt by marriage.

== Life ==
She was born on 11 August 1873 and was the daughter of Prince Moritz of Saxe-Altenburg and his wife, Princess Augusta of Saxe-Meiningen. Her father was a son of Georg, Duke of Saxe-Altenburg, and a younger brother of Ernst I, Duke of Saxe-Altenburg.

Louise Charlotte's mother was the daughter of Bernhard II, Duke of Saxe-Meiningen, and Princess Marie Frederica of Hesse-Kassel. Her uncle Ernst I was succeeded as ruling Duke of Saxe-Altenburg by her brother Ernst II, Duke of Saxe-Altenburg.

Louise Charlotte died in Altenburg in 1953, at the age of 79.

== Marriage and issue ==
She married Prince Eduard of Anhalt, a younger son of Frederick I, Duke of Anhalt, in Altenburg on 6 February 1895. They divorced on 26 January 1918, a few months before he reigned briefly as Duke of Anhalt. They had six children together:

- Frederique Margaretha (11 June 1896 - 18 November 1896)
- Leopold Frederick Maurice Ernest Constantine Aribert Eduard (10 February 1897- 26 December 1898)
- Marie-Auguste (1898-1983), married Prince Joachim of Prussia, the youngest son of Emperor Wilhelm II of Germany
- Joachim Ernst, the last ruling Duke of Anhalt
- Eugen (1903-1980), married Anastasia Jungmeier (1901-1970); their daughter Princess Anastasia (b. 1940) married Maria Emanuel, Margrave of Meissen
- Wolfgang Albert Maurice Frederick William Ernest (1912-1936), died at the age of 23
