= Trockenborn-Wolfersdorf =

- Municipality
- Location of Trockenborn-Wolfersdorf within Saale-Holzland-Kreis district
- Interactive map of Trockenborn-Wolfersdorf
- Location within Germany Location within Thuringia
- Coordinates: 50°47′17″N 11°41′42″E
- Country: Germany
- State: Thuringia
- District: Saale-Holzland-Kreis
- Municipal assoc.: Hügelland/Täler

Government
  - Mayor (2022–28): Dieter Hoog

Area
  - Total: 18.93 km^{2} (7.31 sq mi)
- Elevation: 300 m (980 ft)

Population (2025-12-31)
  - Total: 621
  - Density: 32.8/km^{2} (85.0/sq mi)
- Time zone: UTC+01:00 (CET)
  - Summer (DST): UTC+02:00 (CEST)
- Postal codes: 07646
- Dialling codes: 036428
- Vehicle registration: SHK, EIS, SRO
- Website: www.huegelland-taeler.de

Trockenborn-Wolfersdorf is a municipality in the district Saale-Holzland, in Thuringia, Germany.

Wolfersdorf Castle, a hunting lodge of the Dukes of Saxe-Altenburg, received its name Schloss Fröhliche Wiederkunft ("Palace of Happy Returning") when its first owner, John Frederick I, Elector of Saxony, returned there in 1552 to meet his family after a five years absence as a war prisoner. The last Sovereign, Ernst II, Duke of Saxe-Altenburg, died there in 1955 as a citizen of East Germany.

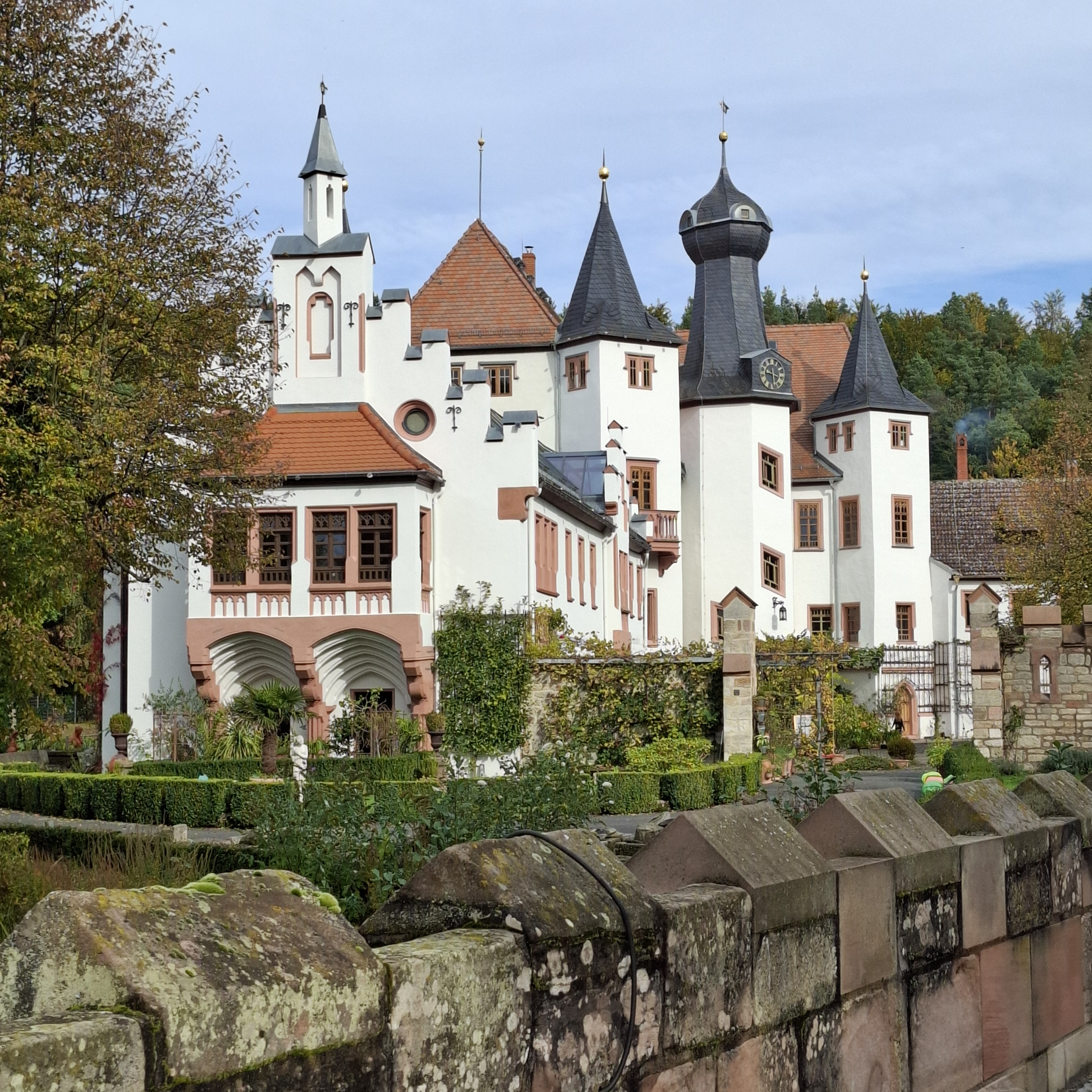
Wolfersdorf Castle ("Palace of Happy Returning")
