= Prince Maurice (disambiguation) =

Prince Maurice may refer to:

- Prince Moritz of Anhalt-Dessau (1712–1760)
- Prince Maurice of Battenberg (1891–1914)
- Moritz, Landgrave of Hesse (1926–2013)
- Prince Maurizio, Duke of Montferrat (1762–1799)
- Prince Maurice of the Netherlands (1843–1850)
- Maurice, Prince of Orange (1567–1625)
- Maurice of the Palatinate (1620–1652)
- Prince Maurice of Savoy (1593–1657)
- Prince Maurice of Teck (March–September 1910), son of Alexander Cambridge, 1st Earl of Athlone

== See also ==
- Charles Maurice de Talleyrand-Périgord (1754–1838)
- John Maurice, Prince of Nassau-Siegen (1604–1679)
- Maurice Henry, Prince of Nassau-Hadamar (1626–1679)
- William Maurice, Prince of Nassau-Siegen (1649–1691)
- Prince Maurits (disambiguation)
- Prince Moritz (disambiguation)
