= NKVD special camp No. 2 =

NKVD special camp located at the site of the former Nazi Buchenwald concentration camp

NKVD special camp No. 2 was an NKVD special camp located at the site of the former Nazi Buchenwald concentration camp.

Between 1945 and February 10, 1950, the camp was administered by the Soviet Union and served as Special Camp No. 2 of the NKVD. It was part of a "special camps" network operating since 1945, formally integrated into the Gulag in 1948. Another "special camp" in Soviet occupied Germany was NKVD special camp Nr. 7 at the former Sachsenhausen concentration camp.

Between August 1945 and the camp's dissolution on March 1, 1950, 28,455 prisoners, including 1,000 women, were held by the Soviet Union at Buchenwald. The 22-year-old American-born John H. Noble and his father were amongst the inmates. A total of 7,113 people died in Special Camp Number 2, according to Soviet records, including Joachim Ernst, Duke of Anhalt. They were buried in mass graves in the woods surrounding the camp. Their relatives did not receive any notification of their deaths. Prisoners included alleged opponents of Stalinism and alleged members of the Nazi Party or Nazi organizations; others were imprisoned due to identity confusion and arbitrary arrests. The NKVD did not allow the prisoners to have any contact with the outside world. Unlike the prisoners held at the former Sachsenhausen and Bautzen camps, no prisoners at Special camp Nr. 2 were put on trial before a Soviet military tribunal.

On January 6, 1950, Soviet Minister of Internal Affairs Sergei Nikiforovich Kruglov ordered all special camps, including Buchenwald, to be handed over to the East German Ministry of Internal Affairs. There is an account of the Soviet NKVD camp by former inmate Maria Linke. Born in tsarist-era Russia as the daughter of a German foundry manager, she was taken into custody due to her fluent Russian.

== Notable prisoners ==
- Joachim Ernst, Duke of Anhalt (1901–1947), Duke of Anhalt
- Helmut Bischoff (1908–1993), police officer, SS-Obersturmbannführer and senior government councilor
- Paul Grimm (1907–1993), historian
- Karl Ritter von Halt (1891–1964), sport official
- Fred Kaltenbach (1895–1945), American radio propagandist
- Walter Meyer (1904–1949), Olympian gold medalist
- John H. Noble (1923–2007), American-German entrepreneur
- Max Poepel (1896–1966), politician of the NSDAP and Lord Mayor of Aue
- Paul Reckzeh (1913–1996), doctor and Gestapo informant
- Marianne Simson (1920–1992), actress
- Hans H. Zerlett (1892–1949), screenwriter and director
