= Prince Maurits =

Prince Maurits may refer to:

- Maurice, Prince of Orange (1567–1625)
- Prince Maurice of the Netherlands (1843–1850)
- Prince Maurits of Orange-Nassau, van Vollenhoven (born 1968)

== See also ==
- Prince Maurice (disambiguation)
- Prince Moritz (disambiguation)
