= Elisabeth Strickrodt =

German actress and princess

Elisabeth
- Countess of Askanien
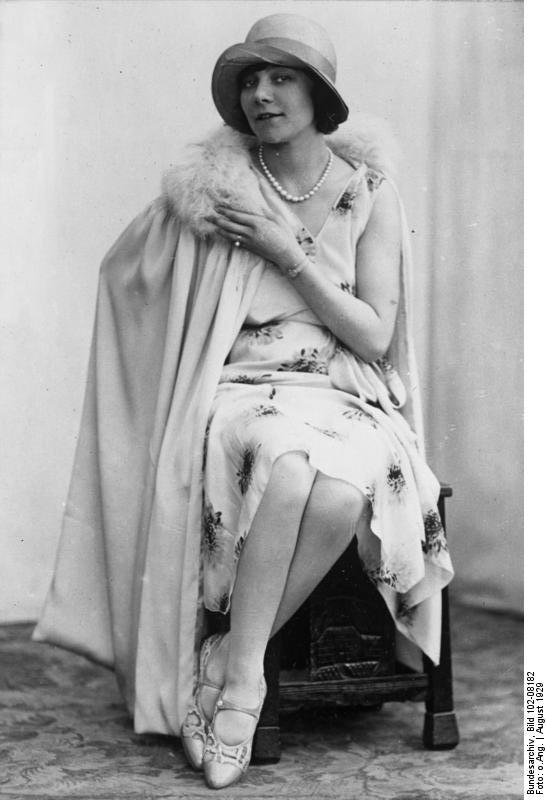
- Born: 3 September 1903; Plauen, Kingdom of Saxony; German Empire
- Died: 5 January 1971 (aged 67); Zehlendorf, Steglitz-Zehlendorf; West Berlin
- Spouse: Joachim Ernst, Duke of Anhalt (m. 1927; div. 1929)
- House: Ascania (by marriage)
- Father: Ferdinand August Kurt Strickrodt
- Mother: Ottilie Franziska Elisabeth Wettstein

Elisabeth Strickrodt, Countess of Askanien, formerly Elisabeth, Duchess of Anhalt, (3 September 1903 – 5 January 1971) was a German actress and the first wife of Joachim Ernst, Duke of Anhalt.

== Biography ==
Elisabeth Strickrodt was born on 3 September 1903 in Plauen to Ferdinand August Kurt Strickrodt, an opera singer, and Ottilie Franziska Elisabeth Wettstein. Strickrodt worked as an actress.

On 3 March 1927 she married Joachim Ernst, Duke of Anhalt at Ballenstedt Castle. Prior to the marriage she was created Countess of Askanien. Upon her marriage she became the Duchess of Anhalt. These titles were not recognized by the German government, as royal and noble titles were abolished in 1919. She and Joachim Ernst divorced in 1929.

Strickrodt died on 5 January 1971 in Zehlendorf.
