= Camp Fünfeichen =

World War II German prisoner-of-war camp

Stalag II-A / Oflag II-E
- Neubrandenburg, Mecklenburg
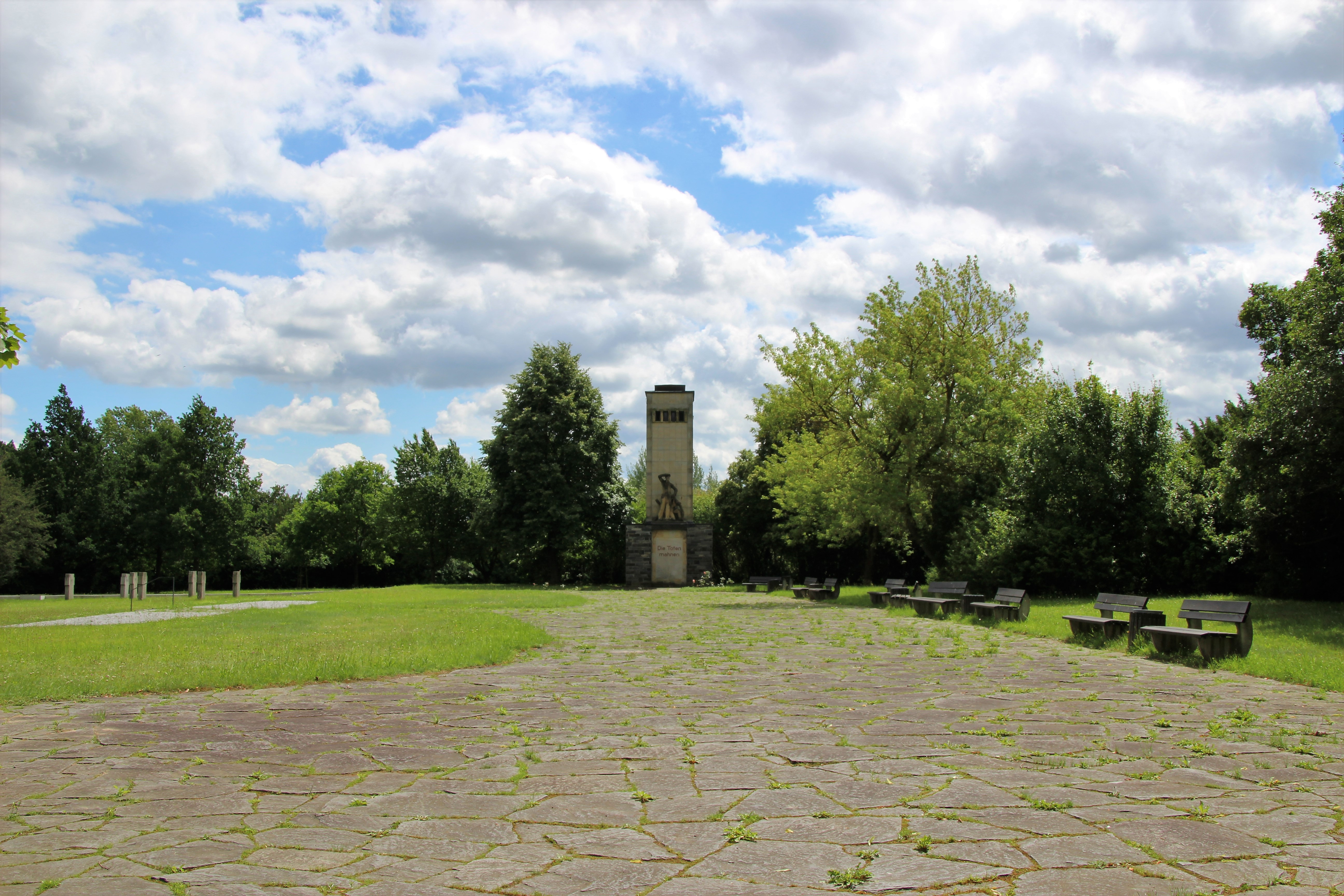
- Memorial at the site of the camp

Site information
- Type: Prisoner-of-war camp, NKVD camp
- Controlled by: Nazi Germany and NKVD

Location
- Germany, 1937
- Coordinates: 53.5219°N 13.2918°E

Site history
- In use: 1939–1945 and 1945–1948

Garrison information
- Occupants: Polish, Dutch, Belgian, French, British, Yugoslav (mostly Serb), Greek, Soviet, Italian, American prisoners of war

Camp Fünfeichen (German: Lager Fünfeichen) was a World War II German prisoner-of-war camp located in Fünfeichen, a former estate within the city limits of Neubrandenburg, Mecklenburg, northern Germany. Built as Stalag II-A Neubrandenburg in 1939, it was extended by the officer camp Oflag II-E in 1940 (renamed Oflag-67, 1944). After the Soviet takeover in 1945 until 1949 it was used as special camp, NKVD-camp Nr. 9 of the Soviet secret service (NKVD). Today, the site of the camp is a memorial.

== Stalag II-A ==
The camp was built in September 1939 to house Polish prisoners from the German September 1939 offensive. The first POWs arrived on 12 September. Some were used for completing the camp construction while housed in tents during the winter. Others were sent to work on farms. From May/June 1940 Dutch and Belgian prisoners arrived from the Battle of France, followed by French. A number of the French were from African colonial regiments and were used for the worst work such as collecting trash.

A new camp for officers, Oflag II-E was created close by and Polish warrant officers and ensigns were transferred to it. In 1941 more prisoners arrived from the Balkans Campaign mostly British and Yugoslavians (mostly Serbs). In late summer 1941 Soviet prisoners from Operation Barbarossa arrived and were placed in a separate enclosure built south of the main camp.

In September 1943 some Italian internees were transferred to Stalag II-A from Italy after the capitulation. From November 1944 to early January 1945 American soldiers captured in various operations during the Allied drive eastward arrived. Most were immediately sent to Arbeitskommandos. From February to April 1945 Neubrandenburg was a waypoint in the forced march westward of Allied prisoners from POW camps further east. The camp was finally liberated on 28 April 1945 when a Soviet armoured division reached Neubrandenburg.

=== Evacuation and repatriation ===
In the middle of April most of the prisoners in the camp and in the outlying Arbeitskommandos were marched westward ahead of the advancing Red Army. Within a few days they were liberated by British troops pushing eastward.

=== Prisoner census ===
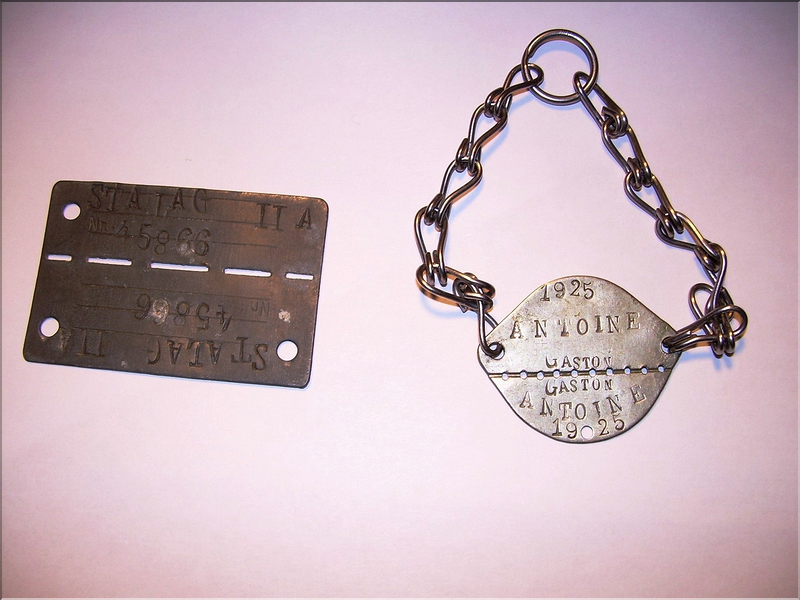
Plaque and bracelet of French prisoner Gaston Antoine, 1940

The official prisoner census of 1 December 1944 records:

- 12,581 French
- 8,694 Russians
- 1,976 Serbs
- 950 Americans
- 738 Poles
- 527 Italians
- 200 British

For a total of 25,720 including 21 officers. Only about 3,500 were in the camp itself, the rest were in outlying sub-camps.

=== Sub-camps ===
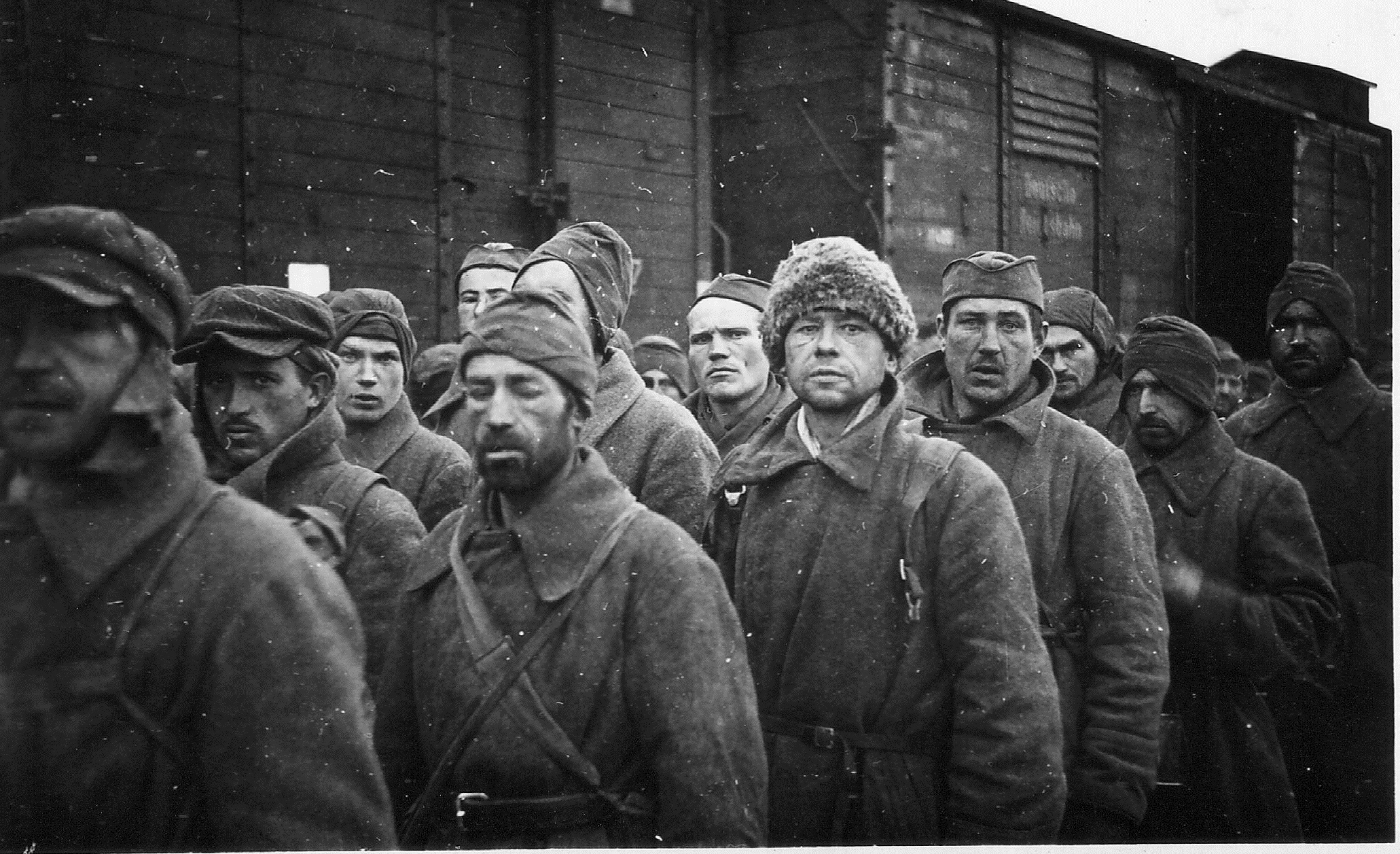
Soviet POWs from Stalag II-A sent to a forced labour subcamp in Teterow

Stalag II-A had about 50 subcamps, known as Arbeitskommando. The largest was Teterow, several miles west of Neubrandenburg, which held about 175 prisoners living in a multi-storey brick building. They worked on the railway lines. Another was at Parchim.

== Oflag II-E ==
Polish prisoners from the German September 1939 offensive were placed in Stalag II-A. After some time the officers were separated out and placed initially in the garages of the adjoining German Army armoured division. Then a separate camp, Oflag II-E, was built for them on the west side of the highway.

From May and June 1940 Dutch and Belgian prisoners arrived from the Battle of France, followed by French. In 1941 more officer prisoners arrived from the Balkans Campaign mostly British, Yugoslavian, Serbs and Greeks. By February 1944 most of the officers had been transferred to other Oflags. Only Dutch officers and a few Russian officers remained. The camp was renumbered Oflag-67. It was liberated by a Soviet armoured division on 28 April 1945.

=== Prisoner census ===
The official prisoner census of 1 December 1944 records:

- 1,322 Dutch officers and 372 non-commissioned officers
- 169 Russian officers

== NKVD Special Camp Number 9 ==
The Soviet administration of post-war Germany, SMAD, took over the former Stalag and turned it into a special camp of the Soviet secret service (NKVD). About 15,000 men, women and children were interned in the camp, and 5,000 of them died, primarily of starvation and disease. Between July and September 1948, 5,181 detainees were released. 2,801 prisoners were transferred to other NKVD special camps, the former Nazi concentration camps in Buchenwald (NKVD special camp Nr.2) and Sachsenhausen (NKVD special camp Nr.7).

== Memorial ==
Since 1993, the site of the former camp has been a memorial, the Mahn- und Gedenkstätte Fünfeichen.

== See also ==
- List of prisoner-of-war camps in Germany

== General sources ==
- "Just One More River to Cross" by John M. Ryan. American Heritage, June/July 2005.
- Story of American Henry H. Gould—includes description of Teterow.
- Very detailed description of camp life—a family history (in Polish)
- Photos of Stalg II-A (PDF) (in German)
- Mahn- und Gedenkstätte Fünfeichen (in German)
