= Ernst II of Saxe-Altenburg =

Last duke of Saxe-Altenburg from 1908 to 1918

Ernst II
- The Duke in 1915

Duke of Saxe-Altenburg
- Reign: 7 February 1908 – 13 November 1918
- Predecessor: Ernst I
- Born: 31 August 1871; Altenburg, Saxe-Altenburg
- Died: 22 March 1955 (aged 83); Fröhliche Wiederkunft Castle, Trockenborn-Wolfersdorf, East Germany
- Spouse: Princess Adelaide of Schaumburg-Lippe (m. 1898; div. 1920) Maria Triebel (m. 1934)
- Issue Detail: Charlotte, Princess Sigismund of Prussia; Georg Moritz, Hereditary Prince of Saxe-Altenburg; Princess Elisabeth; Prince Frederick
Names
- German: Ernst Bernhard Georg Johann Karl Friedrich Peter Albert
- House: Wettin
- Father: Prince Moritz of Saxe-Altenburg
- Mother: Princess Augusta of Saxe-Meiningen
- Religion: Lutheranism

Ernst II (31 August 1871 – 22 March 1955) was the last reigning duke of Saxe-Altenburg and a German general active during World War I.

== Early life ==
He was the fourth child and only son of Prince Moritz, the youngest son of Georg, Duke of Saxe-Altenburg and Princess Augusta of Saxe-Meiningen.

The death of his father, on the 13 May 1907, made him first in the line of succession to the duchy of Saxe-Altenburg. He inherited the dukedom when his uncle and namesake, Ernst I, died without any surviving male issue.

== First marriage ==
In 1898 in Bückeburg, Ernst married his first wife, Princess Adelaide of Schaumburg-Lippe, a granddaughter of George William, Prince of Schaumburg-Lippe. They had four children:

- Princess Charlotte (Potsdam, 4 March 1899 – Hemmelmark bei Eckernförde, 16 February 1989); married on 11 July 1919 Prince Sigismund of Prussia and had issue.
  - Princess Barbara of Prussia (full name: Barbara Irene Adelheid Viktoria Elisabeth Bathildis) (1920–1994). She married Duke Christian Louis of Mecklenburg in 1954 and had two daughters, including Donata Mecklenburg-Solodkoff.
  - Prince Alfred of Prussia (full name: Alfred Friedrich Ernst Heinrich Conrad) (1924–2013). He married Maritza Farkas in 1984, and they had no children.
- Georg Moritz, Hereditary Prince of Saxe-Altenburg (Potsdam, 13 May 1900 – Rendsburg, 13 February 1991), never married, no issue.
- Princess Elisabeth Karola (Potsdam, 6 April 1903 – Breiholz, 30 January 1991), never married, no issue.
- Prince Frederick Ernst (Potsdam, 15 May 1905 – Rosenheim, 23 February 1985), never married, no issue.

== World War I ==
During World War I, Ernst refused all honorary appointments at the Kaiser's headquarters, which would have been considerably safer than other areas. Resigning from his courtesy rank of Generalleutnant, he requested and was granted the colonelcy and the command of his duchy's regiment, the 153rd (8th Thuringian) Infantry. His regiment participated in the Battle of Mons. He replaced Paul von Reichenau as commander of the 15th Infantry Brigade when Reichenau was killed in action in 1914. Quickly promoted to General der Infanterie, he led several brigades on the western front. In 1915, he was awarded the Pour le Mérite award and was given command of the 8th Infantry Division, further distinguishing himself in the Battle of the Somme. In late 1916, he relinquished his field command because of illness and returned to Altenburg for the remainder of the war.

A great lover of science, Ernst had a wireless installation fitted inside his castle in Altenburg at the start of the war, especially to communicate with airships. Ernst also had a lifelong interest in wireless telegraphy and telephony, and he was considered an expert of aeronautics.

When Germany lost the war, all German princes lost their titles and states. Ernst was one of the first princes to realize that major changes were coming and quickly arrived at an amicable settlement with his subjects. He was forced to abdicate the government of the duchy on 13 November 1918 and spent the rest of his life as a private citizen.

== Later life ==
After his abdication Ernst, with a moderate fortune, retired to a hotel in Berlin. Two years later, in 1920, his marriage ended in divorce. Later that year, Ernst announced his engagement to Helena Thomas, an opera singer. They had met while she was temporarily filling an engagement at the Ducal Theatre in Altenburg during the war. The marriage never took place, however.

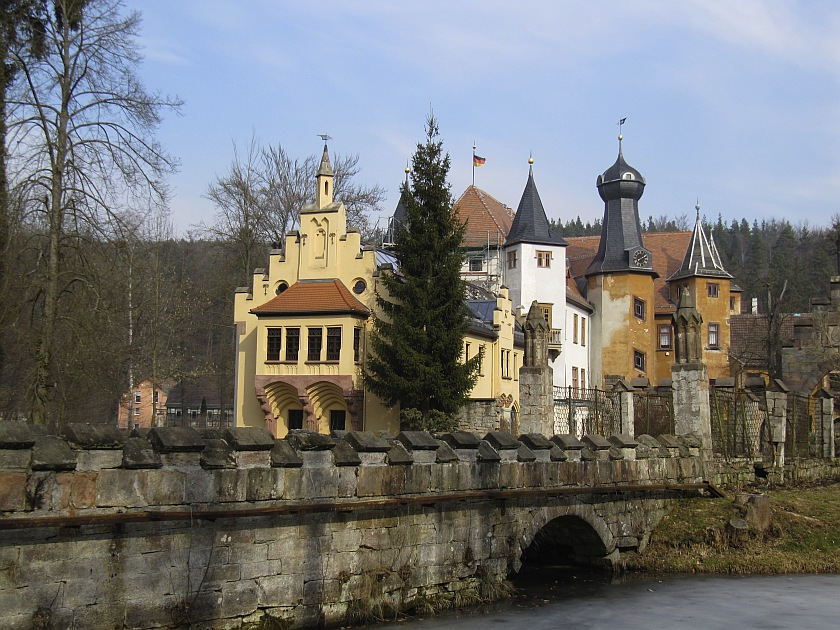
Wolfersdorf Castle ("Palace of Happy Returning")

On 15 July 1934 Ernst married his second wife, Maria Triebel, who had been his companion for many years, at his home, Schloss Fröhliche Wiederkunft ("Palace of Happy Returning") at Wolfersdorf. This hunting lodge received its name when its first owner, John Frederick I, Elector of Saxony, returned there in 1552 to meet his family after five years of absence as a war prisoner. It was a morganatic marriage, and she received only the title of "Baroness Rieseneck". They had no children.

Still interested in science, Ernst established a modern observatory in Wolfersdorf, employing Kurd Kisshauer in 1922. On 1 May 1937, Ernst joined the Nazi Party

Ernst became the only former reigning German prince who accepted German Democratic Republic citizenship after World War II, refusing an offer to leave his beloved "Palace of Happy Returning" and relocate to the British occupation zone. The palace had been confiscated by the Soviet occupiers, but Ernst had been granted free use of it until his death. In March 1954, with the death of Charles Edward, former Duke of Saxe-Coburg and Gotha, he became the last survivor of the German princes who had reigned until 1918. One year later, he died at the palace.

== Honours ==
He received the following orders and decorations:

- (Saxe-Coburg and Gotha) (Duchy of Saxe-Altenburg) (Saxe-Meiningen) Ernestine duchies: Grand Cross of the Saxe-Ernestine House Order, 1889; Joint Grand Master, 7 February 1908
- Principality of Lippe: Cross of Honour of the House Order of Lippe, 1st Class
- Mecklenburg: Grand Cross of the Wendish Crown, with Crown in Ore
- Oldenburg: Grand Cross of the Order of Duke Peter Friedrich Ludwig, with Golden Crown
- Kingdom of Prussia:
  - Knight of the Red Eagle, 1st Class
  - Knight of the Black Eagle, 1908
  - Pour le Mérite (military), 30 May 1915
- Kingdom of Saxony:
  - Knight of the Rue Crown
  - Knight of the Military Order of St. Henry, 9 November 1914; Commander 2nd Class, 28 August 1916
- Württemberg: Grand Cross of the Württemberg Crown, 1893
- Saxe-Weimar-Eisenach: Grand Cross of the White Falcon, 1892
- Brunswick: Grand Cross of Henry the Lion, 1894
- Duchy of Anhalt: Grand Cross of Albert the Bear
- Principality of Bulgaria: Grand Cross of St. Alexander
- Ottoman Empire: Order of Osmanieh, 1st Class

Ernst II of Saxe-Altenburg House of Saxe-Altenburg Cadet branch of the House of Wettin Born: 31 August 1871 Died: 22 March 1955
German royalty
| Preceded by Ernst I, Duke of Saxe-Altenburg | Duke of Saxe-Altenburg; 1908–1918 | Duchy abolished |
| Preceded by Ernst I, Duke of Saxe-Altenburg | Head of the Ducal House of Saxe-Altenburg; 1908–1955 | Succeeded by Prince Georg Moritz of Saxe-Altenburg |
