= NKVD special camps in Germany 1945–1950 =

Post–World War II internment camps in the Soviet-occupied parts of Germany

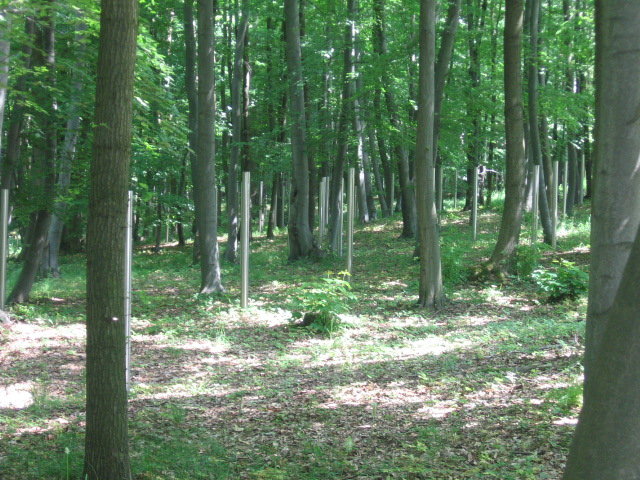
Some 1,100 metal steles mark the small mass graves where 7,000 of the dead from the Buchenwald NKVD special camp Nr. 2 were buried.

NKVD special camps (German: Speziallager) were NKVD-run late and post-World War II internment camps in the Soviet-occupied parts of Germany from May 1945 to January 6, 1950. They were set up by the Soviet Military Administration in Germany (SMAD) and run by the Soviet Ministry of Internal Affairs (MVD). On 8 August 1948, the camps were made subordinate to the Gulag. Because the camp inmates were permitted no contact with the outside world, the special camps were also known as silence camps (German: Schweigelager).

The Soviet occupation authorities did not admit to the existence of the camps until the Western press led the Soviet Union to respond with a moderate propaganda campaign of their own admitting and defending the camps' existence. No inmates were released before 1948. On January 6, 1950, the camps were handed over to the East German government, who tried the remaining detainees. Officially, 157,837 people were detained, including 122,671 Germans and 35,166 citizens of other nations, at least 43,035 of whom did not survive. The actual number of German prisoners was about 30,000 higher. There are no known contemporary photos of the conditions behind the special camp walls.

== Inmates ==
The NKVD Main Camp Administration (GULAG) controlled the special camps from Moscow. All of the camp commanders were senior Soviet military officers and the camps were laid out to GULAG camp specifications just as in Siberia or Central Asia. The camps, however, were not slave labor camps attached to factories or collective farms. On the contrary, prisoners were not allowed to work. Strictly speaking they were not death camps such as the Nazi annihilation camps in Poland, but the death rate nevertheless was very high due to malnourishment and disease.

=== Charges ===
People were arrested because of alleged ties to the Nazis, because they were hindering the establishment of Stalinism, or at random. The legal basis for the arrests was the Beria-order No. 00315 of 18 April 1945, ordering the internment without prior investigation by the Soviet military of "spies, saboteurs, terrorists and active NSDAP members", heads of Nazi organizations, people maintaining "illegal" print and broadcasting devices or weapon deposits, members of the civil administration, and journalists. This was the same type of NKVD order for administrative arrest and deportation to Gulag camps in the Soviet Union used extensively by the Soviet security services where the victims had absolutely no legal recourse.

Inmates were classified "sentenced" or "interned" depending on whether they were tried by a Soviet military tribunal (SMT) or not. A decree issued by the Allied Control Council on 30 October 1946 made a trial prior to internment obligatory, yet in November 1946 only 10% of the inmates were "sentenced", this proportion rose to 55% in early 1950.

Of the "interned", 80% were members of the Nazi Party in early 1945, two thirds in late 1945, and less than half after February 1946. Of the "sentenced", 25% were members of the Nazi Party in 1945, 20% in 1946, 15% in 1947, just above 10% in 1948, and less than 10% since 1949. A significant actual prosecution of Nazi war crimes by the SMT did not take place. Among the alleged Nazis were also boys suspected to be Werwolf members: About 10,000 internees were youths and children, half of whom did not return.

Among the inmates were many supporters or members of the Social Democratic Party of Germany (SPD), which the Soviet authorities sought to suppress, particularly from 1946. When the Social Democratic Party was merged into the Communist Party of Germany (KPD), renamed Socialist Unity Party of Germany (SED), Social Democrats were interned to ensure Marxist–Leninist dominance in the party. Also, people were interned as "spies" because they were suspected of opposing the authoritarian regime, e.g. for having contacts with organizations based in the Western occupation zones, on the basis of Article 58 of the Soviet penal code dealing with "anti-Soviet activities". In the Bautzen special camp, 66% of the inmates fell into this category.

=== Isolation policy ===
The Soviet authorities enforced a policy of total isolation of the inmates. A decree of 27 July 1945 reads: "The primary purpose of the special camp is the total isolation of the contingent therein and the prevention of flights", and prohibits all mail and visitors. Another decree of 25 July 1946 confirmed the "total isolation from the outside world" as a primary purpose, and further reads:

[Inmates of special camps] are to be isolated from the society by special measures, they are not to be legally charged, and in contrast to the usual procedure in legal cases, their cases are not to be documented.

No inmate could contact a relative, nor the other way around (with some exceptions in the early stage of the camps). Relatives were not able to retrieve any information and were not even informed of inmate deaths. Exceptions were not made. In one case, the chief of special camp No. 8 asked the supreme chief of the special camps, Colonel Mikhail Sviridov, whether people arrested in their summer clothes were allowed to request winter clothes from their relatives, and pointed out that the situation was very urgent and that some of the inmates did not even have shoes. Sviridov forbade contact.

In late 1947 the inmates were allowed limited access to Communist newspapers, which represented their first contact with the outside world since their arrests.

=== First releases ===
A first 27,749 were released mid-1948 after a revision of 43,853 cases by a joint commission of SMAD, MGB and MVD (the successor of the NKVD). Among the released were primarily people whose arrest was based on a suspected Nazi background, which was found to be of low significance by the commission.

=== Numbers and casualties ===
The total number of detainees and deaths is uncertain. In 1990 the Soviet Ministry for the Interior released numbers, which were based upon a collection of data compiled after the dissolution of the camps by the last head of its administration in 1950. According to these numbers, 122,671 Germans, 34,706 citizens of the Soviet Union, and 460 foreign citizens had been received. While 40,244 detainees were deported to the Soviet Union, 45,635 were released, 786 were shot and 43,035 died. 6,680 Germans were turned over to POW camps, 128 inmates managed to escape. 14,202 German detainees were handed over to the East German Ministry of the Interior. A critical examination of the data by Natalja Jeske concluded that approximately 30,000 more Germans were detained in the special camps than officially acknowledged. The official number of deaths is nonetheless considered to be accurate. Older estimates, according to which 65,000 to 130,000 or between 50,000 and 80,000 interned persons had died, are too high. Most people died from starvation and diseases. The death rate was particularly high from the end of 1946 to early 1947, when the already low food rations had been reduced further. The food rations for detainees did not differ significantly from the food rations in the Soviet occupation zone in general, but the prisoners were cut off from the black market.

Among the dead were an estimated 12,000 discovered in 1990 in mass graves near the Sachsenhausen concentration camp. Six thousand of the captives in Sachsenhausen were German officers sent there from Western Allied camps. The major causes of death of the prisoners were starvation, disease, particularly tuberculosis and dysentery or torture and execution. Their health was completely neglected.

== Camps in Soviet Military Administration in Germany (SMAD) ==
A total of ten camps existed, set up in former Nazi concentration camps, former stalags, barracks, or prisons.

- NKVD special camp Nr. 1 in the former Stalag IV-B near Mühlberg
- NKVD special camp Nr. 2 in Buchenwald
- NKVD special camp Nr. 3 in Hohenschönhausen (later Stasi-Arbeitslager X)
- NKVD special camp Nr. 4 in Bautzen (since 1948 Nr. 3)
- NKVD special camp Nr. 5 in Ketschendorf / Fürstenwalde
- NKVD special camp Nr. 6 in Jamlitz near Lieberose
- NKVD special camp Nr. 7 in Weesow near Werneuchen (until August 1945) and Sachsenhausen (since August 1945)
- NKVD special camp Nr. 8 in Torgau (Fort Zinna)
- NKVD special camp Nr. 9 in Fünfeichen, Neubrandenburg
- NKVD special camp Nr. 10 in Torgau (Seydlitz-Kaserne)

In addition, numerous prisons were either directly assigned to or seized by the NKVD.

== Prisons and camps in East Central Europe prior to May 1945 ==
Numerous prisons and filtration camps were set prior to May 1945, in an area that is today Poland and Russia, Slovakia, Romania and Yugoslavia. The Soviet forces detained German civilians in the regions they conquered in early 1945. Some were sent for Forced labor of Germans in the Soviet Union and others transferred to the NKVD special camps in occupied Germany after May 1945. These temporary prisons and camps were set up according to the same Beria-doctrine as their counterparts west of the Oder-Neisse line. Almost the complete male German population remaining east of Oder and Neisse, numbering several tens of thousands, was arrested as "Hitlerites" by the NKVD. Only very few actual Nazis were among them.

According to records from the Soviet archives by early May 1945 215,540 persons were interned by the Red Army on the territory of present-day Poland: 138,200 Germans, 36,660 Poles, 27,880 USSR citizens and 10,800 from other countries. Amongst the 215,540 detained 148,540 were sent to the USSR, 62,000 were held in prisons in the battle area and 5,000 died

As of 10 May 1945, there were NKVD camps in what is today Poland and Russia

- Rembertów
- Łódź
- Poznań
- Danzig (Gdansk)
- Kraków
- Schneidemühl (Piła)
- Schwiebus (Świebodzin)
- Landsberg (Warthe) (Gorzow)
- Preußisch Eylau (Bagrationovsk)
- Domtau (Долгоруково)
- Panart (unidentified)
- Mysłowice

NKVD prisons in

- Grudziądz
- Gollnow (Goleniow)
- Stargard
- Insterburg (Chernyakhovsk)
- Tapiau (Gvardeysk)
- Bartenstein (Bartoszyce)
- Königsberg (Kaliningrad),
- Wadowice
- Bielsko-Biała and
- Ratibor (Racibórz);

and NKVD camps as well as NKVD prisons in

- Tost (Toszek)
- Oppeln (Opole) and
- Rawicz.

An additional NKVD prison was in Slovak Ružomberok.

A couple of weeks after the war had come to an end, the prisoners were subsequently transferred to the Soviet Occupation Zone. While immediately after the Soviet occupation of that zone some people detained west of the Oder-Neisse line were transferred to Landsberg east of that line, inmates from camps east of the line who had not been deported to the Soviet Union for forced labor were transferred to camps west of the line following the Potsdam agreement.

While the abovementioned camps and prisons were all listed in attachment 1 to the Beria-doctrine 00461, signed by Beria's substitute Tshernyshow, there were other camps not included in this list. Already on 15 December 1944, Beria had reported to Stalin and Molotov that

- 7890 German citizens were interned in 15 camps in Romania, and
- 16804 German citizens were interned in 22 camps in Yugoslavia.

These were all the people holding German citizenship remaining in these countries.

Additional NKVD camps in Poland, which were likewise not listed in the Beria-doctrine 00461, are known from Polish sources. These camps included

- Działdowo (Soldau)
- Ciechanów
- Nasarzewo near Mlawa
- Mątwy near Inowroclaw
- Antonienhütte (Nowy Bytom)
- Pleß (Pszczyna)
- Sosnowiec
- Cieszyn
- Chorzów
- Knurów
- Szopienice
- Katowice-Ligota
- Gleiwitz (Gliwice)

and others.

== Handover to East Germany ==
The Political Bureau of the Central Committee of the Communist Party of the Soviet Union decided on 28 September 1949 to hand the camps over to the authorities of the German Democratic Republic (East Germany), that was about to be formed from the Soviet occupation zone in Germany. The East German republic was officially founded on 7 October 1949. On 6 January 1950, Soviet Minister of Internal Affairs Kruglov ordered the handing over to the East German Ministry of Internal Affairs of 10,513 inmates for further detention and of 3,500 for trial.

These trials were the so-called Waldheim trials (German: Waldheimer Prozesse) - a series of show-trials. They took place in Waldheim prison in Saxony and handed down previously prepared and overly long sentences. The trials often lasted only a few minutes, and took place behind closed doors. The judges refused to admit evidence for the accused. The sentences were based on the original NKVD arrest protocols, which often involved torture. By June 1950 over 3,000 had been condemned to various additional prison sentences. Many of the convicted had already spent over four years interned in the special camps, and more than half were emaciated and sick. The Waldheim trials introduced the vigorous use of the judicial system as an instrument of political repression of all dissident elements in the GDR. Many of these sentences were revised in 1952. Before the hand-over, a number of inmates were deported to Siberia - their fate remains unknown as of 2015.

== See also ==
- Special camp (disambiguation), for other types of Soviet special camps
- German atrocities committed against Soviet prisoners of war
- Soviet atrocities committed against prisoners of war during World War II
