= Eduard, Duke of Anhalt =

Duke of Anhalt in 1918

Eduard
- Eduard in 1916

Duke of Anhalt
- Reign: 21 April 1918 – 13 September 1918
- Predecessor: Friedrich II
- Successor: Joachim Ernst
- Born: 18 April 1861; Dessau, Anhalt-Dessau
- Died: 13 September 1918 (aged 57); Berchtesgaden, Bavaria
- Spouse: Princess Louise Charlotte of Saxe-Altenburg (m. 1895; div. 1918)
- Issue: Princess Friederike; Prince Leopold; Princess Marie-Auguste; Joachim Ernst, Duke of Anhalt; Prince Eugen; Prince Wolfgang
Names
- Eduard Georg Wilhelm Maximilian
- House: Ascania
- Father: Friedrich I, Duke of Anhalt
- Mother: Princess Antoinette of Saxe-Altenburg

Eduard Georg Wilhelm Maximilian (18 April 1861 – 13 September 1918) was a German prince of the House of Ascania and the penultimate ruler of the Duchy of Anhalt from April to September 1918.

== Early life ==
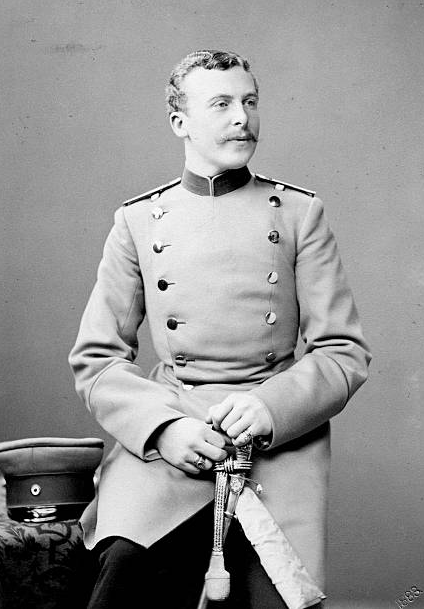
Prince Eduard in 1883

Prince Eduard was born at Dessau, the capital of the Duchy of Anhalt, in 1861 as the third son of Duke Friedrich I of Anhalt and his wife Princess Antoinette of Saxe-Altenburg. As Eduard's eldest brother, Leopold, died without male offspring in 1886, and the next brother, Frederick, had no issue, Eduard became heir presumptive and Hereditary Prince following the death of their father, Duke Friedrich I, in 1904.

== Reign ==
Eduard succeeded his brother Duke Friedrich II of Anhalt on 21 April 1918, but his brief reign came to an end five months later with his own death on 13 September 1918. He was succeeded by his eldest surviving son Prince Joachim Ernst under the regency of Eduard's younger brother, Prince Aribert.

== Marriage and children ==
Duke Eduard married Princess Louise Charlotte of Saxe-Altenburg in Altenburg on 6 February 1895. She was a daughter of Prince Moritz of Saxe-Altenburg and his wife Princess Augusta of Saxe-Meiningen. They had six children before divorcing in 1918.

- Princess Friederike of Anhalt (1896-1896)
- Prince Leopold of Anhalt (1897–1898)
- Princess Marie-Auguste of Anhalt (1898–1983) married in 1916 Prince Joachim of Prussia
- Prince Joachim Ernst of Anhalt (1901–1947)
- Prince Eugen Friedrich Ernst August Heinrich Adolf Aribert of Anhalt (1903–1980) married Anastasia Jungmeier (b. 25 July 1901, Straubing – d. 20 February 1970, Vevey) on 2 October 1935. Albeit he claimed to be his brother Joachim's immediate successor, the latter considered his marriage a morganatic one.
  - Anastasia of Anhalt (b. 22 December 1940) married in 1962 Maria Emanuel, Margrave of Meissen
- Prince Wolfgang of Anhalt (b. 12 July 1912, Schloss Ballenstedt – d. 10 April 1936)

== Ancestry ==
Ancestors of Eduard, Duke of Anhalt

8. Frederick, Hereditary Prince of Anhalt-Dessau
4. Leopold IV, Duke of Anhalt
9. Landgravine Amalie of Hesse-Homburg
2. Frederick I, Duke of Anhalt
10. Prince Louis Charles of Prussia
5. Princess Frederica of Prussia, Duchess of Anhalt-Dessau
11. Duchess Frederica of Mecklenburg-Strelitz
1. Eduard, Duke of Anhalt
12. Frederick, Duke of Saxe-Altenburg
6. Prince Eduard of Saxe-Altenburg
13. Duchess Charlotte Georgine of Mecklenburg-Strelitz
3. Princess Antoinette of Saxe-Altenburg
14. Karl, Prince of Hohenzollern-Sigmaringen
7. Princess Amalie of Hohenzollern-Sigmaringen
15. Marie Antoinette Murat

Eduard, Duke of Anhalt House of Ascania Born: 18 April 1861 Died: 13 September 1918
Regnal titles
Preceded by Friedrich II, Duke of Anhalt	Duke of Anhalt; 1918	Succeeded by Joachim Ernst, Duke of Anhalt
