= Princess Augusta of Saxe-Meiningen =

Augusta of Saxe-Meiningen
- Princess Moritz of Saxe-Altenburg
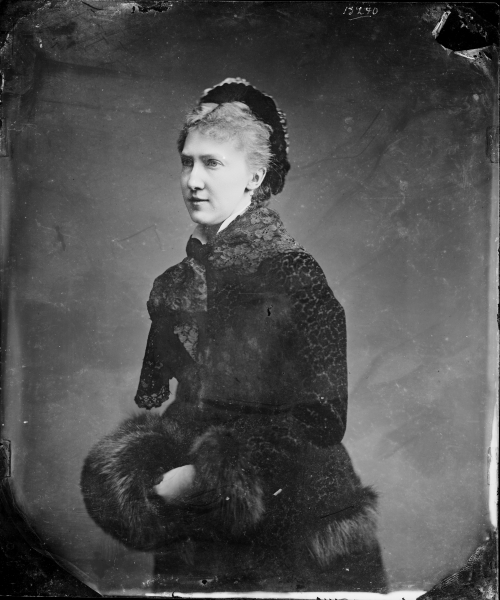
- Augusta in 1880
- Born: 6 August 1843; Meiningen, Saxe-Meiningen
- Died: 11 November 1919 (aged 76); Altenburg, Weimar Republic
- Spouse: Prince Moritz of Saxe-Altenburg (m. 1862; died 1907)
- Issue: Marie Anne, Princess of Schaumburg-Lippe; Grand Duchess Elizabeth Mavrikievna of Russia; Princess Margarethe; Ernst II, Duke of Saxe-Altenburg; Luise Charlotte, Princess Edward of Anhalt
Names
- German: Auguste Luise Adelheid Karoline Ida
- House: Saxe-Meiningen
- Father: Bernhard II, Duke of Saxe-Meiningen
- Mother: Princess Marie Frederica of Hesse-Kassel

Princess Augusta of Saxe-Meiningen (6 August 1843 – 11 November 1919) was the daughter of Bernhard II, Duke of Saxe-Meiningen, and Princess Marie Frederica of Hesse-Kassel. She was the mother of Ernst II, Duke of Saxe-Altenburg.

== Family and early life ==
Augusta was the only daughter of the Duke and Duchess of Saxe-Meiningen. Her only sibling was Georg, who would succeed their father in 1866. Georg was seventeen years older than she was.

Augusta's paternal grandparents were Georg I, Duke of Saxe-Meiningen and Luise Eleonore of Hohenlohe-Langenburg. Her maternal grandparents were William II, Elector of Hesse and Princess Augusta of Prussia, daughter of Frederick William II of Prussia.

Like her brother, Augusta was born in Meiningen. Despite the large age difference, they seemed to have a good relationship. He was a great lover of theatre; in 1856, he wrote his parents stating how happy he was that Augusta was allowed to attend the theatre and how their mother was more tolerant than she had been when he was a child, when she had declared that no child under thirteen should be allowed in the theatre.

== Marriage ==
On 15 October 1862, Augusta married Prince Moritz of Saxe-Altenburg in Meiningen. He was fourteen years older, and was a younger son of Georg, Duke of Saxe-Altenburg and Marie Luise of Mecklenburg-Schwerin. They had five children:

Name	Birth	Death	Notes
Princess Marie Anne	14 March 1864	3 May 1918	married on 16 April 1882 to George, Prince of Schaumburg-Lippe.
Princess Elisabeth Augusta Marie Agnes	25 January 1865	24 March 1927	married on 27 April 1884 to Grand Duke Konstantin Konstantinovich of Russia; [upon her marriage, she took the name Elizaveta Mavrikievna in a Russian Orthodox baptism]
Princess Margarethe Marie Agnes Adelaide Karoline Fredericka	22 May 1867	17 June 1882	
Ernst II, Duke of Saxe-Altenburg	31 August 1871	22 March 1955	married Princess Adelaide of Schaumburg-Lippe
Princess Luise Charlotte Marie Agnes	11 August 1873	14 April 1953	married on 6 February 1895 to Prince Edward of Anhalt; they divorced in 1918, shortly before he became Duke of Anhalt and later died.

== Honours ==
- (Saxe-Coburg and Gotha) (Duchy of Saxe-Altenburg) (Saxe-Meiningen) Ernestine duchies: Insignia of the Saxe-Ernestine House Order
- Kingdom of Bavaria: Dame of the Order of Theresa, in Diamonds
- Russian Empire: Grand Cross of St. Catherine
