= Prince Moritz of Saxe-Altenburg =

Prince Moritz
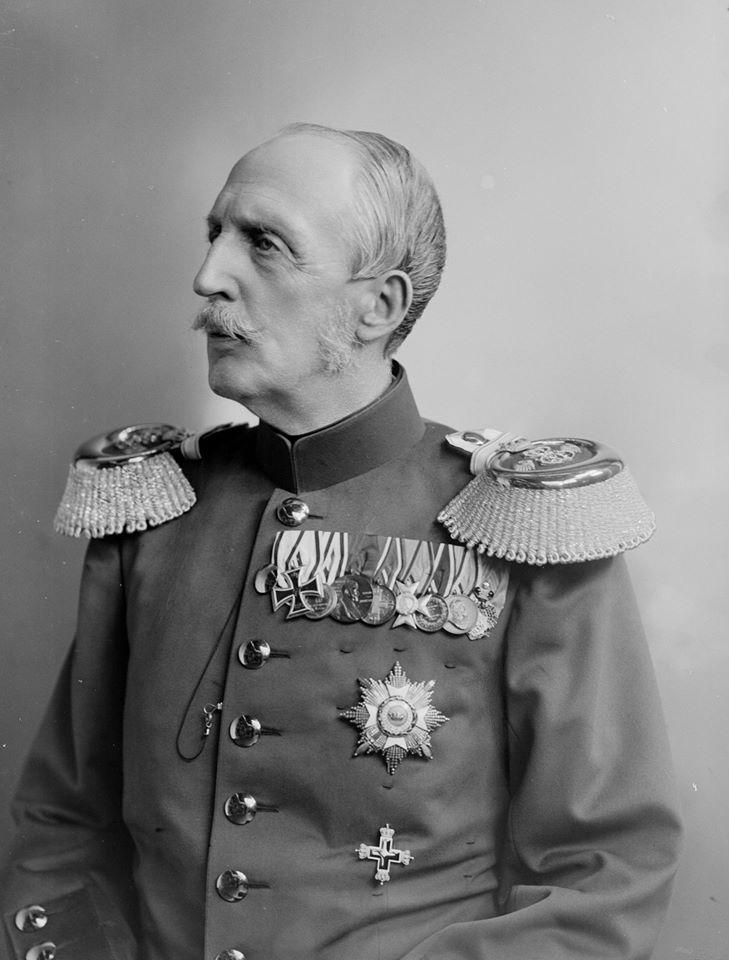
- Portrait by Arno Kersten
- Born: 24 October 1829; Eisenberg, Saxe-Altenburg
- Died: 13 May 1907 (aged 77); Arco, Tirol, Austria-Hungary
- Spouse: Princess Augusta of Saxe-Meiningen (m. 1862)
- Issue: Marie Anne, Princess of Schaumburg-Lippe; Grand Duchess Elizabeth Mavrikievna of Russia; Princess Margarethe; Ernst II, Duke of Saxe-Altenburg; Louise Charlotte, Princess Edward of Anhalt
Names
- German: Moritz Franz Friedrich Constantin Alexander Heinrich August Carl Albrecht
- House: House of Wettin
- Father: Georg, Duke of Saxe-Altenburg
- Mother: Duchess Marie Louise of Mecklenburg-Schwerin

Prince Moritz of Saxe-Altenburg (24 October 1829 in Eisenberg – 13 May 1907 in Arco, Austria-Hungary), was a member of the ducal house of Saxe-Altenburg. He was the father of Ernst II, Duke of Saxe-Altenburg.

== Biography ==
Moritz was born on 24 October 1829 in Eisenberg, as a member of the Ernestine branch of the House of Wettin, whose other, Albertine branch, was the ruling family of the Kingdom of Saxony.

He was the third, but second surviving son of Georg, Duke of Saxe-Altenburg and Duchess Marie Louise of Mecklenburg-Schwerin (the daughter of Frederick Louis, Hereditary Grand Duke of Mecklenburg-Schwerin and his first wife, Grand Duchess Elena Pavlovna of Russia).

Moritzstraße in Altenburg, capital of the Duchy is named after the Prince.

== Marriage and issue ==
In Meiningen on 15 October 1862, Moritz married Princess Augusta of Saxe-Meiningen, second child and only daughter of Bernhard II, Duke of Saxe-Meiningen, and Princess Marie Frederica of Hesse-Kassel.

They had five children, one son and four daughters:

- Princess Marie Anne (14 March 1864 – 3 May 1918), married on 16 April 1882 to Prince Georg of Schaumburg-Lippe. They had nine children.
- Princess Elisabeth Augusta Marie Agnes (25 January 1865 – 24 March 1927), married on 27 April 1884 to Grand Duke Konstantin Konstantinovich of Russia. Upon her marriage, she took the name Elizaveta Mavrikievna in a Russian Orthodox baptism. They had nine children.
- Princess Margarethe Marie Agnes Adelaide Karoline Fredericka (22 May 1867 - 17 June 1882), died young.
- Ernst II, Duke of Saxe-Altenburg (31 August 1871 – 22 March 1955), married Princess Adelaide of Schaumburg-Lippe and had issue; they divorced on 17 January 1920, shortly after the collapse of the German Empire. They had nine children.
- Princess Louise Charlotte (11 August 1873 – 14 April 1953), married on 6 February 1895 to Eduard, Duke of Anhalt, and divorced on 26 January 1918, shortly before he died. They had six children.

== Death ==
Prince Moritz died on 13 May 1907, in Arco, Tirol, Austro-Hungarian Empire, aged 77.

He was buried, alongside his wife, Princess Augusta of Saxe-Meiningen, in the Fürstengruft in the Friedhof, Altenburg, until 1974, when their bodies were reburied in a grave in the Friedhof, Altenburg, Thuringia, Germany.

== Honours ==
He received the following orders and decorations:

- (Saxe-Coburg and Gotha) (Duchy of Saxe-Altenburg) (Saxe-Meiningen) Ernestine duchies: Grand Cross of the Saxe-Ernestine House Order, November 1847
- Kingdom of Prussia:
  - Grand Cross of the Red Eagle, 18 October 1861
  - Iron Cross (1870), 2nd Class with White Band
  - Red Cross Medal, 1st Class, 27 January 1899
- Mecklenburg: Grand Cross of the Wendish Crown, with Crown in Ore
- Kingdom of Saxony: Knight of the Rue Crown, 1848
- Kingdom of Hanover:
  - Grand Cross of the Royal Guelphic Order, 1852
  - Grand Cross of the Order of Ernst August
- Oldenburg: Grand Cross of the Order of Duke Peter Friedrich Ludwig, with Golden Crown, 9 February 1852
- Saxe-Weimar-Eisenach: Grand Cross of the White Falcon, 4 February 1851
- Ascanian duchies: Grand Cross of Albert the Bear, 28 April 1853
- (Principality of Schaumburg-Lippe) Lippe:
  - Cross of Honour of the House Order of Lippe, 1st Class
  - Red Cross Medal, 1st Class
- Kingdom of Greece: Grand Cross of the Redeemer
- Russian Empire: Knight of St. Andrew
- Brunswick: Grand Cross of Henry the Lion
