= Friedrich Günther, Prince of Schwarzburg =

Friedrich Günther
- Prince of Schwarzburg
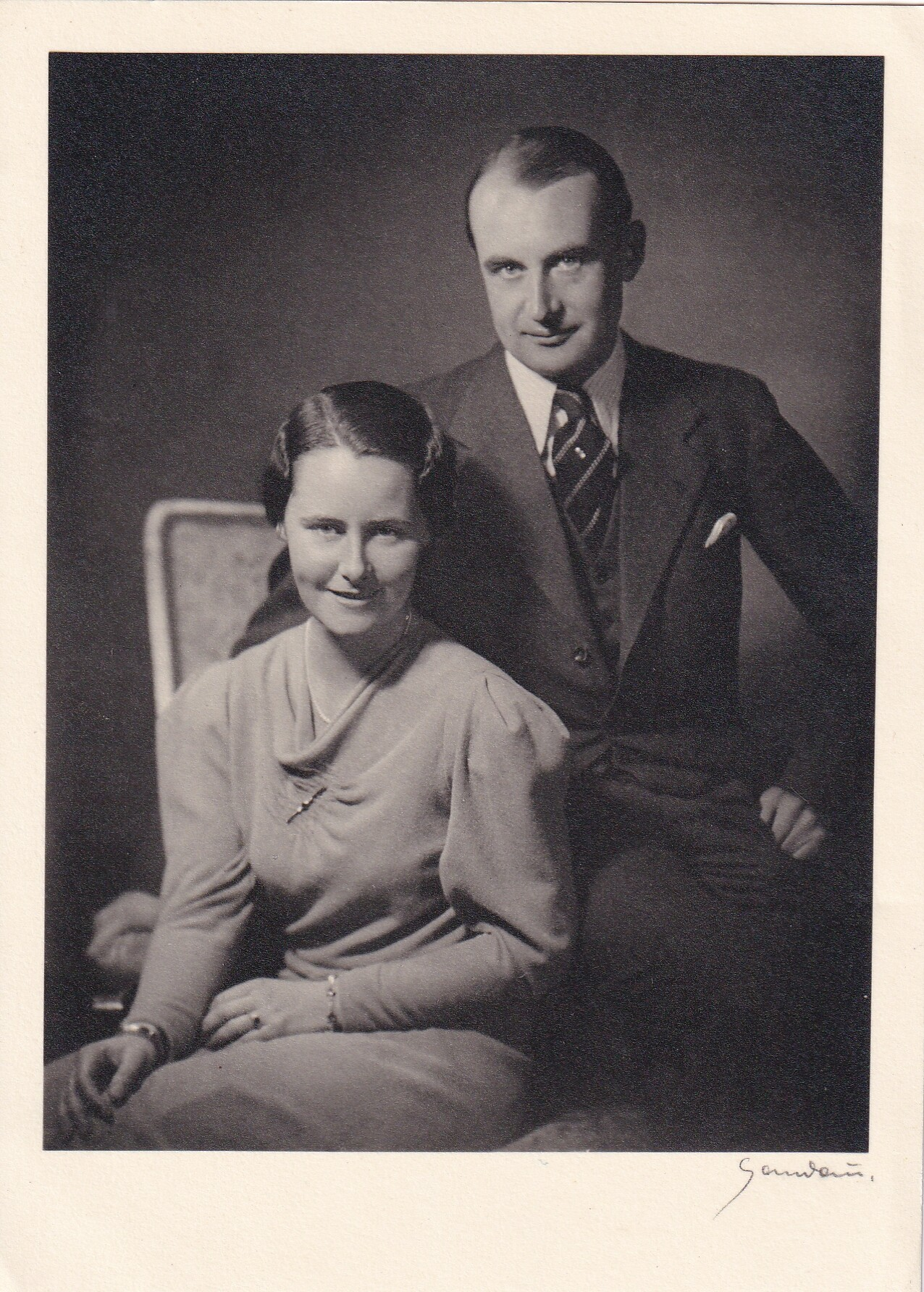
- Friedrich Günther and his wife Sophie, 1938
- Born: 5 March 1901; Großharthau, Kingdom of Saxony, German Empire
- Died: 9 November 1971 (aged 70); Munich, Bavaria, West Germany
- Spouse: Princess Sophie of Saxe-Weimar-Eisenach (m. 1938; div. 1938)
- House: Schwarzburg
- Father: Sizzo, Prince of Schwarzburg
- Mother: Princess Alexandra of Anhalt

Friedrich Günther, Prince of Schwarzburg (5 March 1901 – 9 November 1971) was the final head of the House of Schwarzburg and heir to the formerly sovereign principalities of Schwarzburg-Rudolstadt and Schwarzburg-Sondershausen.

== Early life ==
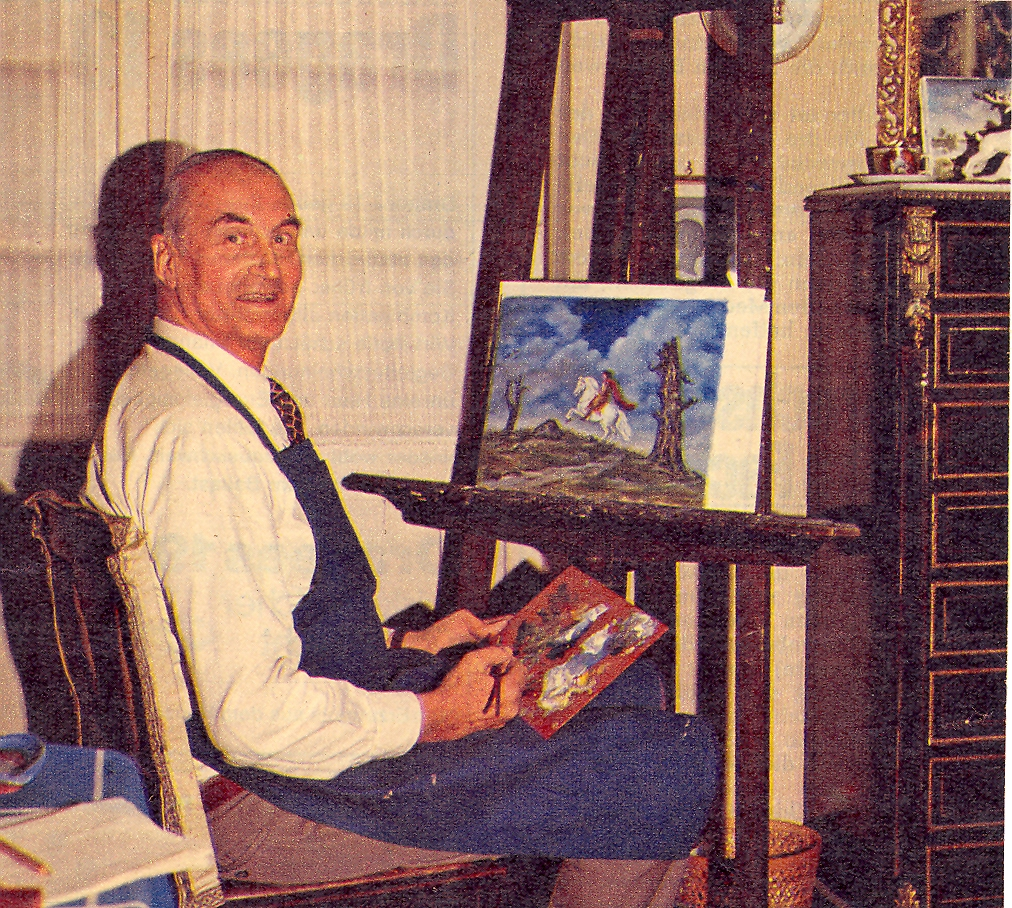
Friedrich Günther of Schwarzburg

He was born in Großharthau in the Kingdom of Saxony the son of Prince Sizzo von Leutenberg and his wife, Princess Alexandra of Anhalt. On 21 April 1896, his father was recognised as a dynast of the house as Prince Sizzo of Schwarzburg, having previously lacked succession rights due to his parents' morganatic marriage. In 1909 the two Schwarzburg principalities were united in a personal union under Prince Günther of Schwarzburg-Rudolstadt. This followed the extinction of the elder Sondershausen branch, at which point Friedrich Günther became second in line to the united principality, following Sizzo. But the German Revolution prompted Prince Günther to abdicate on 22 November 1918, thereby ending the rule of the House of Schwarzburg.

After Prince Günther's death on 16 April 1925, Sizzo succeeded as head of the deposed princely House of Schwarzburg until his own death on 24 March 1926, which left his son Friedrich Günther as the head of the family and claimant to the throne of the Principality of Schwarzburg.

== Marriage ==
Prince Friedrich Günther was married on 7 April 1938 at Heinrichau (present-day Henryków, Lower Silesian Voivodeship) to Princess Sophie of Saxe-Weimar-Eisenach, eldest daughter of William Ernest, Grand Duke of Saxe-Weimar-Eisenach. The marriage proved short-lived and less than a year later on 1 November 1938, they were divorced, without children.

== Death and succession ==
Following Friedrich Günther's death in 1971 in Munich, Bavaria, the House of Schwarzburg became extinct in the male line.

Historically the Schwarzburg principalities could descend by semi-Salic primogeniture: in the event of the extinction of all male dynasts (as happened with the death of Prince Friedrich Günther) females were, prior to abolition of the Principality of Schwarzburg in 1918, eligible to inherit the throne. Princess Marie Antoinette of Schwarzburg (1898–1984), the only sibling of Prince Friedrich Günther, by her 1925 marriage to Count Friedrich Magnus zu Solms-Wildenfels (1886–1945), was the mother of Friedrich Magnus (b. 1927), the sixth Count zu Solms-Wildenfels to bear that name and to head the Wildenfels cadet branch of the House of Solms. Neither of the latter's two sons, Michael (b. 1949) and Konstantin (b. 1950), nor his younger brother, Albrecht (b. 1929), has children.

Another interpretation of the succession to the principality of Schwarzburg in the event of the extinction of males of its Sondershausen and Rudolstadt branches was put forth by the German jurist, Hermann Schulze in 1883. He noted that inter-dynastic inheritance pacts contracted by semi-sovereign vassals of the Holy Roman Emperors remained legally enforceable in the German Empire after the abolition of the Holy Roman Empire itself in 1806, and conferred rights on male heirs superior to those of female heirs inheriting by semi-Salic primogeniture. In 1433 Count Heinrich of Schwarzburg and his son entered a pact with Botho, Count of Stolberg under which, if the Schwarzburg male line became extinct then Stolberg and the Counts of Hohenstein would share the majority of the Schwarzburg territories. With the extinction of the House of Hohenstein the houses of Schwarzburg and Stolberg renewed the pact on 28 January 1594. Philipp, 5th Prince zu Stolberg-Wernigerode (born 1967) is the seniormost male descendant by primogeniture of Botho of Stolberg. Philipp's first marriage in 2001 to Countess Caroline von Waldburg-Wolfegg-Waldsee (b. 1971) ended in a divorce. He then remarried in 2006 to Countess Leonille Douglas and has three children by her.

== Ancestry ==
Ancestors of Friedrich Günther, Prince of Schwarzburg

8. Louis Frederick II, Prince of Schwarzburg-Rudolstadt
4. Friedrich Günther, Prince of Schwarzburg-Rudolstadt
9. Caroline of Hesse-Homburg
2. Sizzo, Prince of Schwarzburg
10. George Bernhard of Anhalt-Dessau
5. Countess Helena of Raina
11. Therese Emma von Erdmannsdorff
1. Friedrich Günther, Prince of Schwarzburg
12. Leopold IV, Duke of Anhalt
6. Frederick I, Duke of Anhalt
13. Princess Frederica of Prussia, Duchess of Anhalt-Dessau
3. Princess Alexandra of Anhalt
14. Prince Eduard of Saxe-Altenburg
7. Princess Antoinette of Saxe-Altenburg
15. Princess Amalie of Hohenzollern-Sigmaringen

Friedrich Günther, Prince of Schwarzburg House of Schwarzburg Born: 5 March 1901 Died: 9 November 1971
Titles in pretence
Preceded by Prince Sizzo	— TITULAR — Prince of Schwarzburg-Rudolstadt; Prince of Schwarzburg-Sondershausen; 1926–1971; Reason for succession failure: Principalities abolished in 1918	Succeeded by Princess Marie Antoinette
