= Princess Marie Antoinette of Schwarzburg =

Princess Marie Antoinette
- Countess of Solms-Wildenfels
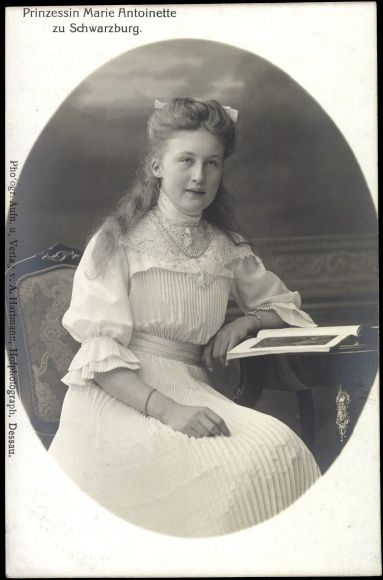
- Marie Antoninette, circa 1912
- Born: 7 February 1898; Großharthau, Kingdom of Saxony
- Died: 4 November 1984 (aged 86); Klingen, West Germany
- Spouse: Friedrich Magnus V, Count of Solms-Wildenfels (m. 1925; died 1945)
- Issue: Countess Anne of Solms-Wildenfels; Friedrich Magnus VI, Count of Solms-Wildenfels; Countess Jutta of Solms-Wildenfels; Count Albert of Solms-Wildenfels; Countess Kristin of Solms-Wildenfels
- House: Schwarzburg
- Father: Sizzo, Prince of Schwarzburg
- Mother: Princess Alexandra of Anhalt

Marie Antoinette, Princess of Schwarzburg (German: Marie Antoinette Prinzessin zu Schwarzburg; 7 February 1898 – 4 November 1984) was the eldest child of Sizzo, Prince of Schwarzburg.

== Early life and background ==
Marie Antoinette was born at Großharthau, Kingdom of Saxony, the first child of Sizzo, Prince of Schwarzburg (1860–1926), and his wife, Princess Alexandra of Anhalt (1868–1958). Her father was the son of Friedrich Günther, Prince of Schwarzburg-Rudolstadt, and Countess Helena von Reina (1835-1860); and her mother was the daughter of Frederick I, Duke of Anhalt, and Princess Antoinette of Saxe-Altenburg. Through her mother she was descendant of King Frederick William II of Prussia.

== Marriage ==
Marie Antoinette married on 4 January 1925 in Wildenfels to Friedrich Magnus V, Count of Solms-Wildenfels (1886–1945), only son of Friedrich Magnus IV, Count of Solms-Wildenfels (1847-1910) and his wife, Anna Jacqueline, Countess of Bentinck-Aldenburg-Middachten (1855-1903).

They had five children:

- Countess Anne of Solms-Wildenfels (1 January 1926 – 7 July 2015); unmarried and without issue.
- Friedrich Magnus VI, Count of Solms-Wildenfels (b. 18 January 1927); married three times. His first marriage was in 1948 to Katharina Duerst; they divorced in 1954 and remarried in 1966; had issue. His second marriage was in 1971 to Gisela Frania; they divorced in 1972 and had no issue. His third marriage was in 1994 to Gisella Marie Parsoll, with whom he had no issue.
- Countess Jutta of Solms-Wildenfels (b. 12 February 1928); married in 1957 Salim Farid Saad.
- Count Albrecht Sizzo of Solms-Wildenfels (28 May 1929 – 8 February 2010); married in 1970 Ingrid Gross.
- Countess Kristin of Solms-Wildenfels (b. 27 May 1938); married in 1971 Dietrich Gross.

== House of Schwarzburg ==
On 21 April 1896 her father was recognised as a dynast of the House of Schwarzburg, having previously not had dynastic rights due to his parents' morganatic marriage. Following her brother's death in 1971, the House of Schwarzburg became extinct in the male line.

== Ancestry ==
Ancestors of Princess Marie Antoinette of Schwarzburg

8. Ludwig Friedrich II, Prince of Schwarzburg-Rudolstadt
4. Friedrich Günther, Prince of Schwarzburg-Rudolstadt
9. Landgravine Karoline of Hesse-Homburg
2. Sizzo, Prince of Schwarzburg
10. Prince Georg Bernhard of Anhalt-Dessau
5. Countess Helena von Raina
11. Therese Emma von Erdmannsdorff
1. Princess Marie Antoinette of Schwarzburg
12. Leopold IV, Duke of Anhalt
6. Friedrich I, Duke of Anhalt
13. Princess Frederica Wilhelmina of Prussia
3. Princess Alexandra of Anhalt
14. Prince Eduard of Saxe-Altenburg
7. Princess Antoinette of Saxe-Altenburg
15. Princess Amalie of Hohenzollern-Sigmaringen

== Notes and sources ==
- Genealogisches Handbuch des Adels, Fürstliche Häuser, Reference: 1991 201

Princess Marie Antoinette of Schwarzburg House of Schwarzburg Born: 7 February 1898 Died: 4 November 1984
Titles in pretence
Preceded by Prince Friedrich Günther	— TITULAR — Princess of Schwarzburg-Rudolstadt; Princess of Schwarzburg-Sondershausen; 1971–1984; Reason for succession failure: Principalities abolished in 1918	Succeeded by Friedrich Magnus VI, Count of Solms-Wildenfels
