= Princess Alexandra of Anhalt =

Alexandra of Anhalt
- Princess of Schwarzburg
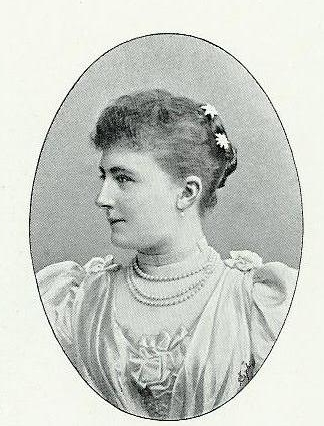
- Princess Alexandra in 1898
- Born: 4 April 1868; Dessau, Duchy of Anhalt
- Died: 26 August 1958 (aged 90); Schwetzingen, West Germany
- Spouse: Sizzo, Prince of Schwarzburg (m. 1897; died 1926)
- Issue: Marie Antoinette, Countess of Solms-Wildenfels; Princess Irene of Schwarzburg; Prince Friedrich Gunther of Schwarzburg
Names
- Alexandra Therese Marie
- House: Ascania
- Father: Frederick I, Duke of Anhalt
- Mother: Princess Antoinette of Saxe-Altenburg

Princess Alexandra Therese Marie of Anhalt (4 April 1868 - 26 August 1958) was a Princess of Anhalt and member of the House of Ascania by birth. As the wife of Sizzo, Prince of Schwarzburg, she was a Princess of Schwarzburg by marriage.

== Early life ==
Princess Alexandra was born on 4 April 1868 in Dessau as the youngest child of Frederick I, Duke of Anhalt and Princess Antoinette of Saxe-Altenburg.

== Marriage ==
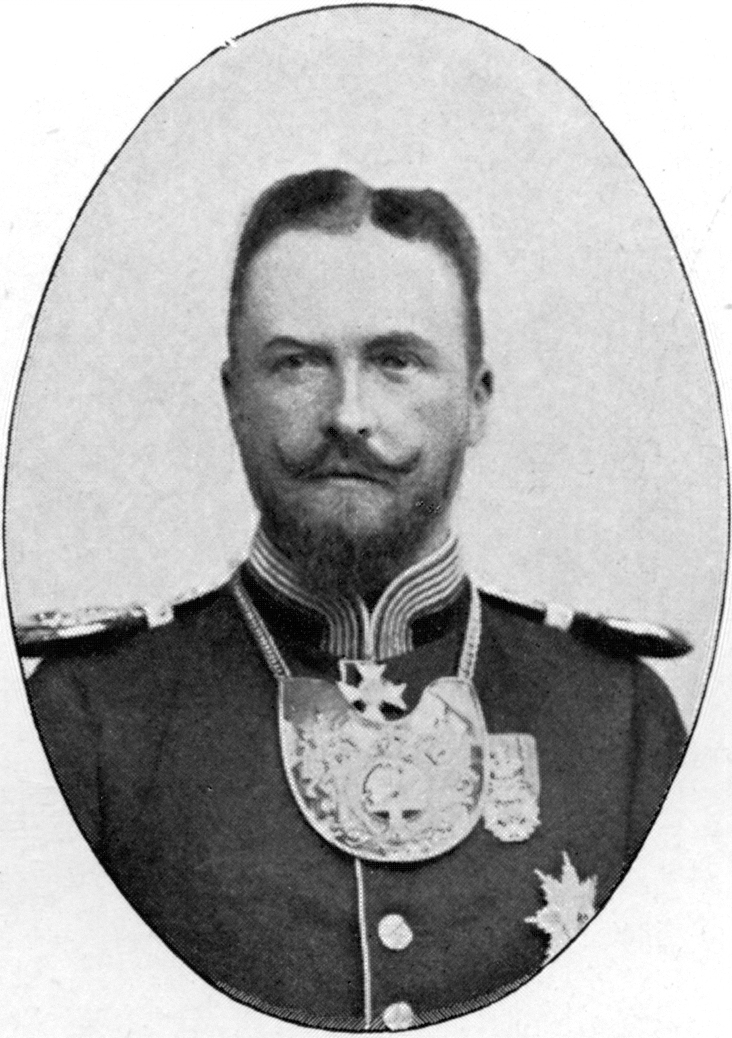
Alexandra's husband, Prince Sizzo

In the late 1880s false rumours of an engagement between Prince Albert Victor of Wales and Princess Alexandra emerged when in fact the couple had never even met.

In Dessau on 25 January 1897 Princess Alexandra was married to Prince Sizzo of Schwarzburg.

After their marriage the couple lived in Großharthau.

== Children ==
Name	Birth	Death	Notes
Princess Marie Antoinette of Schwarzburg	7 February 1898	4 November 1984	married Friedrich Magnus V, Count of Solms-Wildenfels, issue
Princess Irene of Schwarzburg	27 May 1899	28 February 1939
Friedrich Günther, Prince of Schwarzburg	5 March 1901	9 November 1971	married Princess Sophie of Saxe-Weimar-Eisenach

== Ancestry ==
Ancestors of Princess Alexandra of Anhalt

8. Frederick, Hereditary Prince of Anhalt-Dessau
4. Leopold IV, Duke of Anhalt
9. Landgravine Amalie of Hesse-Homburg
2. Frederick I, Duke of Anhalt
10. Prince Louis Charles of Prussia
5. Princess Frederica of Prussia
11. Duchess Frederica of Mecklenburg-Strelitz
1. Princess Alexandra of Anhalt
12. Frederick, Duke of Saxe-Altenburg
6. Prince Eduard of Saxe-Altenburg
13. Duchess Charlotte Georgine of Mecklenburg-Strelitz
3. Princess Antoinette of Saxe-Altenburg
14. Karl, Prince of Hohenzollern-Sigmaringen
7. Princess Amalie of Hohenzollern-Sigmaringen
15. Marie Antoinette Murat
