= Prince Aribert of Anhalt =

Regent of Anhalt in 1918

- Prince Aribert in 1909
- Born: 18 June 1866; Wörlitz, Duchy of Anhalt
- Died: 24 December 1933 (aged 67); Munich, Nazi Germany
- Spouse: Princess Marie Louise of Schleswig-Holstein (m. 1891; ann. 1900)
Names
- Aribert Joseph Alexander
- House: Ascania
- Father: Frederick I, Duke of Anhalt
- Mother: Princess Antoinette of Saxe-Altenburg

Prince Aribert Joseph Alexander of Anhalt (18 June 1866 – 24 December 1933) was regent of Anhalt from September to November 1918 on behalf of his underage nephew Joachim Ernst, Duke of Anhalt. As regent, following the German revolution, he abdicated in the name of his nephew on 12 November 1918, thus ending the rule of the House of Ascania in Anhalt.

== Early life ==
Prince Aribert was born in Wörlitz in the Duchy of Anhalt, then part of the German Confederation. He was the fourth son of Frederick I, Duke of Anhalt, and Princess Antoinette of Saxe-Altenburg. Anhalt was a sovereign duchy, from 1871 part of the German Empire.

== Marriage ==
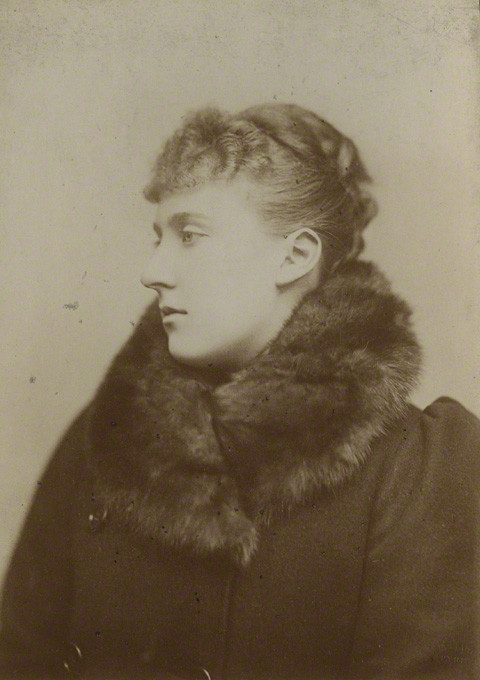
Princess Marie Louise in the 1890s

On 6 July 1891, he married Princess Marie Louise of Schleswig-Holstein at St. George's Chapel in Windsor Castle. Princess Marie Louise was the daughter of Prince Christian of Schleswig-Holstein and Princess Helena of the United Kingdom, making her a granddaughter of Queen Victoria. The bride's first cousin, the German Emperor Wilhelm II, had been instrumental in arranging the match.

In December 1900, the Duke of Anhalt used his prerogative as reigning Duke to annul the marriage. Princess Marie Louise, on an official visit to Canada at the time, immediately returned to England. According to her memoirs, she regarded her marriage vows as binding, so she never remarried. Her memoirs do, however, indicate rage over her marital experience and an obvious dislike of her former husband.

Though contemporary sources did not directly suggest it was a cause of his marriage dissolution, a number of contemporaries and subsequent historical accounts suggest Aribert was bisexual or homosexual, and some have suggested an indiscretion with a male attendant was the catalyst for the dissolution and that the marriage had never been consummated. However, other sources later suggested he was planning to remarry.

== Military career ==
Prince Aribert entered the Prussian Army on 21 September 1882 as a Secondelieutenant à la suite of the Anhaltisches Infanterie-Regiment Nr. 93. On 3 November 1885, while remaining à la suite of Infanterie-Regiment Nr. 93, he was assigned to the 1st Guards Dragoon Regiment (1. Garde-Dragoner-Regiment), where he was promoted to supernumary Premierlieutenant on 27 January 1891 and given a patent on 29 February 1892. On 27 January 1895, he was promoted to supernumary Rittmeister. On 14 November 1901 he was given the Charakter of a Major à la suite of the army. On 13 September 1912, he was given the Charakter of Oberstleutnant à la suite of the army.

During World War I, Prince Aribert served on the staff of the 8th Infantry Division and as a battalion and regimental commander. On 6 October 1914, he was promoted to Oberst à la suite of the army. In October 1917, he took command of the 16th Infantry Brigade. On 22 March 1918, he was promoted to Generalmajor à la suite of the army.

== Regent ==
When his nephew, Joachim Ernst, succeeded his father as Duke of Anhalt on 13 September 1918, Aribert was appointed regent due to the young age of Joachim Ernst. Aribert's brief regency came to an end on 12 November 1918 when he abdicated in the name of his nephew following the German revolution. The duchy subsequently became the Free State of Anhalt.

== Later life ==
Prince Aribert died in Munich aged 67 on 24 December 1933.

== Honours ==
Prince Aribert received the following orders and decorations:

- Duchy of Anhalt:
  - Order of Albert the Bear, Grand Cross with Swords
    - Grand Cross (1882)
    - Swords to the Grand Cross
  - Friedrich Cross
- Grand Duchy of Baden:
  - House Order of Fidelity (1889)
  - Order of Berthold the First (1889)
- Kingdom of Bavaria:
  - Order of Saint Hubert, Knight's Cross (1885)
  - Military Merit Order, 3rd Class with Swords (13 November 1914)
- Duchy of Brunswick: Order of Henry the Lion, Grand Cross (1888)
- Grand Duchy of Mecklenburg-Strelitz:
  - House Order of the Wendish Crown, Grand Cross with Crown in Ore (15 November 1888)
  - Cross for Distinction in War
- Kingdom of Prussia:
  - Order of the Red Eagle, 1st Class
  - Iron Cross 1st and 2nd Class
  - Officer's Service Decoration Cross
  - Centenary Medal of Kaiser Wilhelm I. (22 March 1897)
- Grand Duchy of Saxe-Weimar-Eisenach: Order of the White Falcon, Grand Cross
- (Saxe-Coburg and Gotha) (Duchy of Saxe-Altenburg) (Saxe-Meiningen) Saxon duchies: Ducal Saxe-Ernestine House Order
  - Grand Cross
  - Commander's Cross 2nd Class with Swords (23 May 1915)
- Principality of Schaumburg-Lippe: Order of the Cross of Honor, Grand Cross
- Hohenzollern principalities: Princely House Order of Hohenzollern, Cross of Honour 1st Class
- Kingdom of Bulgaria: Order of Saint Alexander, Grand Cross
- ~~United Kingdom: Honorary Grand Cross of the Bath (civil), with Collar, 14 July 1891~~ (annulled)

== Ancestry ==
Ancestors of Prince Aribert of Anhalt

8. Frederick, Hereditary Prince of Anhalt-Dessau
4. Leopold IV, Duke of Anhalt
9. Landgravine Amalie of Hesse-Homburg
2. Frederick I, Duke of Anhalt
10. Prince Louis Charles of Prussia
5. Princess Frederica of Prussia
11. Duchess Frederica of Mecklenburg-Strelitz
1. Prince Aribert of Anhalt
12. Frederick, Duke of Saxe-Altenburg
6. Prince Eduard of Saxe-Altenburg
13. Duchess Charlotte Georgine of Mecklenburg-Strelitz
3. Princess Antoinette of Saxe-Altenburg
14. Karl, Prince of Hohenzollern-Sigmaringen
7. Princess Amalie of Hohenzollern-Sigmaringen
15. Marie Antoinette Murat
