= Sizzo, Prince of Schwarzburg =

Sizzo
- Prince of Schwarzburg
- Sizzo in 1907
- Born: 3 June 1860; Rudolstadt, Schwarzburg-Rudolstadt
- Died: 24 March 1926 (aged 65); Großharthau, Weimar Republic
- Spouse: Princess Alexandra of Anhalt (m. 1897)
- Issue: Marie Antoinette, Countess of Solms Wildenfels; Princess Irene; Friedrich Günther, Prince of Schwarzburg
- House: House of Schwarzburg
- Father: Friedrich Günther, Prince of Schwarzburg-Rudolstadt
- Mother: Countess Helene of Raina

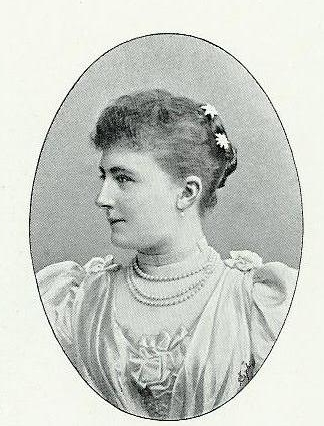
Princess Alexandra of Schwarzburg

Günther Sizzo, Prince of SchwarzburgGerman: [ˈɡʏntɐ ˈzɪtsoː](3 June 1860 – 24 March 1926) was the head of the House of Schwarzburg and pretender to the principalities of Schwarzburg-Rudolstadt and Schwarzburg-Sondershausen.

== Early life ==
He was born in Rudolstadt as the son of the reigning Prince of Schwarzburg-Rudolstadt, Friedrich Günther, and his second wife, Countess Helene of Reina. She died three days after giving birth to Prince Sizzo and his twin sister, Princess Helene. The mother of Prince Sizzo was the daughter of Prince George Bernhard of Anhalt-Dessau by his morganatic wife, Therese Emma von Erdmannsdorff.

Although Prince Sizzo's mother had been adopted by her uncle Prince Wilhelm of Anhalt and given the title of Princess of Anhalt on 1 August 1855 by the reigning Duke of Anhalt-Dessau, the marriage of his parents was still considered morganatic. Because of this, Prince Sizzo was not entitled to use the title of Prince of Schwarzburg-Rudolstadt. Instead, he was created Prince of Leutenberg on 21 June 1860. In spite of being denied the use of the title of Prince of Schwarzburg-Rudolstadt, Prince Sizzo was granted succession rights to the principality of Schwarzburg-Rudolstadt in the event of the extinction of all male dynasts. Although all members of the Rudolstadt branch consented to this, the members of the Sondershausen branch did not, as this stood against their prospects of inheriting Rudolstadt (in the future they died out even earlier, however).

== Recognition of rights ==
On 21 April 1896, Prince Sizzo's succession rights were recognised by all members of the House of Schwarzburg. In addition, he was made a full member of the house and able to use the title of Prince of Schwarzburg. Following the agreement, Prince Sizzo became the heir presumptive of Schwarzburg-Rudolstadt, ahead of the Sondershausen princes, and third in line to Schwarzburg-Sondershausen behind the reigning prince of Rudolstadt, Prince Günther Victor, who was second and the brother of the reigning prince of Schwarzburg-Sonderhausen, Leopold, who was first (died in 1906).

Following the death of Prince Karl Günther of Schwarzburg-Sondershausen on 28 March 1909, the Sondershausen branch became extinct and the Schwarzburg principalities were united in a personal union under Prince Günther Victor of Schwarzburg-Rudolstadt. Therefore, Prince Sizzo became the heir presumptive to the two principalities.

However, his chances of succeeding were ended on 22 November 1918, when Prince Günther Victor abdicated following the German revolution, which deposed all of the German monarchs. Following the death of Prince Günther Victor on 16 April 1925, Prince Sizzo succeeded him as head of the House of Schwarzburg. His tenure as head of the house would not last long and less than a year later, Prince Sizzo died in Großharthau with his only son, Prince Friedrich Günther, succeeding him as head of the house and pretender to the Schwarzburg principalities.

== Marriage and children ==
Prince Sizzo was married to Princess Alexandra of Anhalt on 25 January 1897 in Dessau. Princess Alexandra was the daughter of the reigning Duke of Anhalt, Friedrich I, and his wife Princess Antoinette of Saxe-Altenburg. Prince Sizzo and Princess Alexandra had two daughters and one son.

- Princess Marie Antoinette of Schwarzburg (1898–1984); married Friedrich Magnus V, Count of Solms-Wildenfels; had issue.
- Princess Irene of Schwarzburg (1899–1939)
- Prince Friedrich Günther of Schwarzburg (1901–1971); married Princess Sophie of Saxe-Weimar-Eisenach; the marriage ended in divorce with no issue.

== Honours and awards ==
- Kingdom of Saxony: Grand Cross of the Albert Order, with Golden Star, 1898

Sizzo, Prince of Schwarzburg House of Schwarzburg Born: 3 June 1860 Died: 24 March 1926
Titles in pretence
Preceded by Prince Günther	— TITULAR — Prince of Schwarzburg-Rudolstadt; Prince of Schwarzburg-Sondershausen; 1925–1926; Reason for succession failure: Principalities abolished in 1918	Succeeded by Prince Friedrich Günther
