= Leopold, Hereditary Prince of Anhalt =

Leopold
- Hereditary Prince of Anhalt
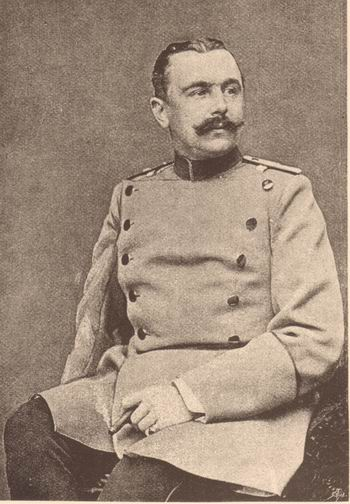
- Hereditary Prince Leopold of Anhalt
- Born: 18 July 1855; Dessau, Anhalt
- Died: 2 February 1886 (aged 30); Cannes, France
- Spouse: Princess Elisabeth of Hesse-Kassel (m. 1884)
- Issue: Antoinette, Princess Frederick of Schaumburg-Lippe
Names
- German: Leopold Friedrich Franz Ernst
- House: House of Ascania
- Father: Frederick I, Duke of Anhalt
- Mother: Princess Antoinette of Saxe-Altenburg

Leopold of Anhalt (18 July 1855 – 2 February 1886) was a German prince of the House of Ascania. From 1871 until his death, he was heir to the duchy of Anhalt.

== Early life ==
Prince Leopold was born on 18 July 1855 in Dessau as the first child of Hereditary Prince Frederick of Anhalt-Dessau-Köthen and his wife Princess Antoinette of Saxe-Altenburg. He was named after his grandfather Duke Leopold of Anhalt-Dessau-Köthen.

In 1863 his grandfather, Duke Leopold, became Duke of the united Duchy of Anhalt following the death of the last Duke of Anhalt-Bernburg.

On 22 May 1871, Duke Leopold died and Prince Leopold's father succeeded to the Duchy of Anhalt. Leopold himself now became hereditary prince.

== Marriage and issue ==
In the autumn of 1883, Hereditary Prince Leopold proposed to Princess Viktoria of Prussia, daughter of Crown Prince Frederick William of Prussia and Princess Victoria of the United Kingdom. But his proposal was refused. In April 1884 Friedrich von Holstein recorded that:

Princess Viktoria – or her mother – turned down the hereditary Prince of Anhalt last autumn.

In the end of December 1883 Hereditary Prince Leopold was engaged to Princess Elisabeth of Hesse-Kassel, the eldest daughter of Prince Frederick William of Hesse-Kassel and Princess Anna of Prussia. When hearing of this engagement, Queen Victoria, whose daughter apparently had not informed her mother of the rejected proposal, wrote:

but I regret that you have not got him en réserve for Vicky if her fond hopes cannot be realised.

Leopold and Elisabeth were married on 26 May 1884 at Schloss Philippsruhe in Hanau. They had one daughter:

1. Antoinette (Schloss Georgium, 3 March 1885 – Dessau, 3 April 1963), married on 26 May 1909 to Prince Frederick of Schaumburg-Lippe.

== Death ==
Less than one year after the birth of his daughter, Leopold died unexpectedly in Cannes on 2 February 1886. As he had no sons, he was succeeded as Hereditary prince by his younger brother Frederick who would eventually become Duke Frederick II of Anhalt.

Princess Elisabeth never remarried and survived her husband by almost 70 years. She died in Dessau on 7 June 1955.

== Honours ==
- Duchy of Anhalt: Grand Cross of the House Order of Albert the Bear, 1873
- (Saxe-Coburg and Gotha) (Duchy of Saxe-Altenburg) (Saxe-Meiningen) Ernestine duchies: Grand Cross of the Saxe-Ernestine House Order, 1875
- Hohenzollern: Cross of Honour of the Princely House Order of Hohenzollern, 1st Class
- Mecklenburg: Grand Cross of the House Order of the Wendish Crown, with Crown in Ore, 17 April 1877

== Ancestry ==
Ancestors of Leopold, Hereditary Prince of Anhalt

8. Frederick, Hereditary Prince of Anhalt-Dessau
4. Leopold IV, Duke of Anhalt
9. Landgravine Amalie of Hesse-Homburg
2. Frederick I, Duke of Anhalt
10. Prince Louis Charles of Prussia
5. Princess Frederica Wilhelmina of Prussia
11. Duchess Frederica of Mecklenburg-Strelitz
1. Leopold, Hereditary Prince of Anhalt
12. Frederick, Duke of Saxe-Altenburg
6. Prince Eduard of Saxe-Altenburg
13. Duchess Charlotte Georgine of Mecklenburg-Strelitz
3. Princess Antoinette of Saxe-Altenburg
14. Karl, Prince of Hohenzollern-Sigmaringen
7. Princess Amalie of Hohenzollern-Sigmaringen
15. Marie Antoinette Murat
