= Friedrich II of Anhalt =

Duke of Anhalt from 1904 to 1918

Frederick II
- Friedrich II in 1909

Duke of Anhalt
- Reign: 24 January 1904 – 21 April 1918
- Predecessor: Frederick I
- Successor: Eduard
- Born: 19 August 1856; Dessau, Duchy of Anhalt
- Died: 21 April 1918 (aged 61); Ballenstedt, Duchy of Anhalt
- Spouse: Princess Marie of Baden (m. 1889)
Names
- Leopold Frederick Edward Carl Alexander; German: Leopold Friedrich Eduard Karl Alexander
- House: House of Ascania
- Father: Frederick I, Duke of Anhalt
- Mother: Princess Antoinette of Saxe-Altenburg

Frederick II (German: Leopold Friedrich II. Eduard Karl Alexander Herzog von Anhalt; 19 August 1856 – 21 April 1918) was the Duke of Anhalt from 1904 until 1918.

== Early life ==
He was born in Dessau in 1856, he was the second son of Hereditary Prince Frederick of Anhalt-Dessau and his wife Princess Antoinette of Saxe-Altenburg.

His father succeeded as Duke of Anhalt on 22 May 1871 and Frederick became heir apparent and Hereditary Prince following the death of his elder brother Leopold on 2 February 1886.

== Marriage ==
Frederick was married on 2 July 1889 at Karlsruhe to Princess Marie of Baden (26 July 1865 – 29 November 1939). She was a daughter of Prince Wilhelm of Baden and his wife Princess Maria of Leuchtenberg, as well as an elder sister of Prince Maximilian of Baden, 8th Chancellor of Germany. The marriage produced no issue.

== Reign ==
On 24 January 1904, Frederick succeeded his father as Duke of Anhalt.

During his reign he was known for his love of music and maintained a Court Theatre which became celebrated throughout Europe.

He was Grand Master of the Order of Albert the Bear and a Knight of the Order of the Black Eagle. In 1914, during World War I, he instituted the Friedrich Cross as a decoration for merit in time of war.

He died at Ballenstedt Castle on 21 April 1918. As his marriage to Marie of Baden was without issue, he was succeeded as duke by his younger brother Eduard.

== Honours and arms ==
Royal monogram.

Coin of Frederick II of Anhalt, Struck 1914
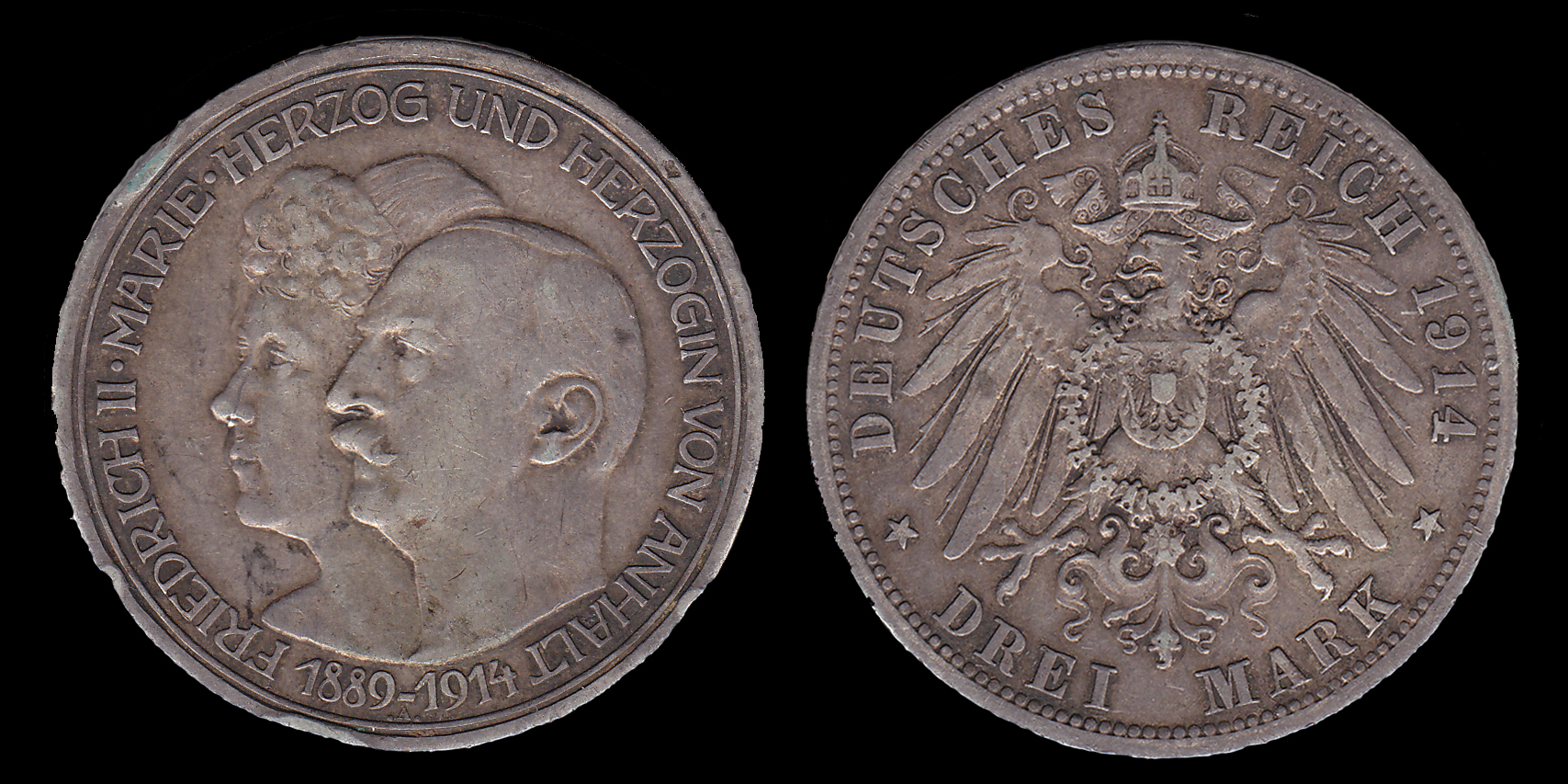
First side of the image: Obverse: (German) FRIEDRICH II MARIE HERZOG UND HERZOGIN VON ANHALT, 1889-1914, in English: "Frederick II, Marie, Duke and Duchess of Anhalt, 1889-1914"
Second side of the image: Reverse: (German) DEUTSCHES REICH, 1914, DREI MARK, in English: "The German Reich, 1914, Three Marks."

German orders and decorations

- Anhalt:
  - Grand Cross of the Order of Albert the Bear, 1873; Grand Master, 24 January 1904
  - Founder of the Friedrich Cross, 1914
- Baden:
  - Knight of the House Order of Fidelity, 1889
  - Knight of the Order of Berthold the First, 1889
- Bavaria: Knight of St. Hubert, in Diamonds, 1883
- (Saxe-Coburg and Gotha) (Duchy of Saxe-Altenburg) (Saxe-Meiningen) Ernestine duchies: Grand Cross of the Saxe-Ernestine House Order
- Mecklenburg: Grand Cross of the Wendish Crown, with Crown in Ore, 17 April 1877
- Prussia:
  - Knight of the Red Eagle, 1st Class
  - Knight of Honour of the Johanniter Order
- Hohenzollern: Cross of Honour of the Princely House Order of Hohenzollern, 1st Class
- Württemberg: Grand Cross of the Württemberg Crown, 1889

Foreign orders and decorations

- (Austrian Empire) (Kingdom of Hungary) Austria-Hungary: Grand Cross of the Royal Hungarian Order of St. Stephen, 1908
- Denmark: Knight of the Elephant, 14 July 1902
- Kingdom of Greece: Grand Cross of the Redeemer
- Ottoman Empire: Order of Osmanieh, 1st Class
- Kingdom of Romania: Grand Cross of the Star of Romania
- Kingdom of Serbia: Grand Cross of the Cross of Takovo

== Ancestry ==
Ancestors of Friedrich II of Anhalt

8. Frederick, Hereditary Prince of Anhalt-Dessau
4. Leopold IV, Duke of Anhalt
9. Landgravine Amalie of Hesse-Homburg
2. Frederick I, Duke of Anhalt
10. Prince Louis Charles of Prussia
5. Princess Frederica of Prussia, Duchess of Anhalt-Dessau
11. Duchess Frederica of Mecklenburg-Strelitz
1. Friedrich II, Duke of Anhalt
12. Frederick, Duke of Saxe-Altenburg
6. Prince Eduard of Saxe-Altenburg
13. Duchess Charlotte Georgine of Mecklenburg-Strelitz
3. Princess Antoinette of Saxe-Altenburg
14. Karl, Prince of Hohenzollern-Sigmaringen
7. Princess Amalie of Hohenzollern-Sigmaringen
15. Marie Antoinette Murat

Friedrich II of Anhalt House of Ascania Born: 18 August 1856 Died: 22 April 1918
Regnal titles
Preceded by Frederick I	Duke of Anhalt; 1904–1918	Succeeded by Eduard
