= Solms =

- Town
- Coat of arms

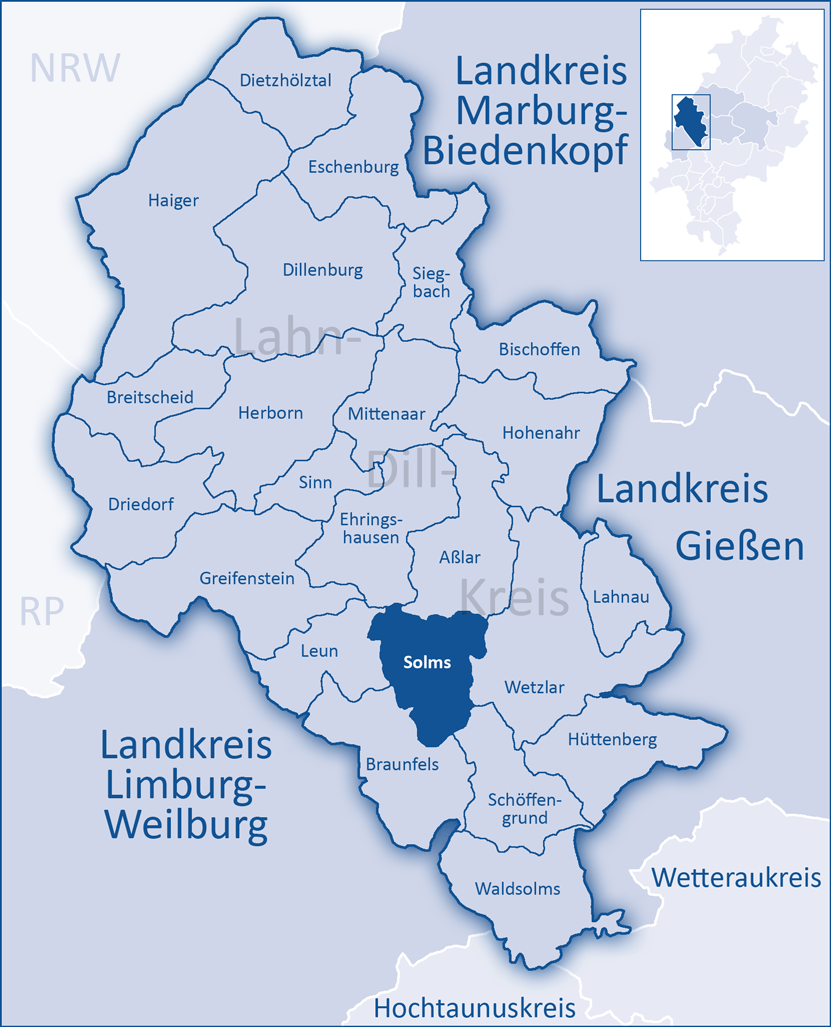
- Location of Solms within Lahn-Dill-Kreis district
- Interactive map of Solms
- Location within Germany Location within Hesse
- Coordinates: 50°32′23″N 08°24′26″E
- Country: Germany
- State: Hesse
- Admin. region: Gießen
- District: Lahn-Dill-Kreis

Government
  - Mayor (2022–28): Frank Inderthal (SPD)

Area
  - Total: 34.02 km^{2} (13.14 sq mi)
- Elevation: 144 m (472 ft)

Population (2025-12-31)
  - Total: 13,567
  - Density: 398.8/km^{2} (1,033/sq mi)
- Time zone: UTC+01:00 (CET)
  - Summer (DST): UTC+02:00 (CEST)
- Postal codes: 35606
- Dialling codes: 06442
- Vehicle registration: LDK
- Website: www.solms.de

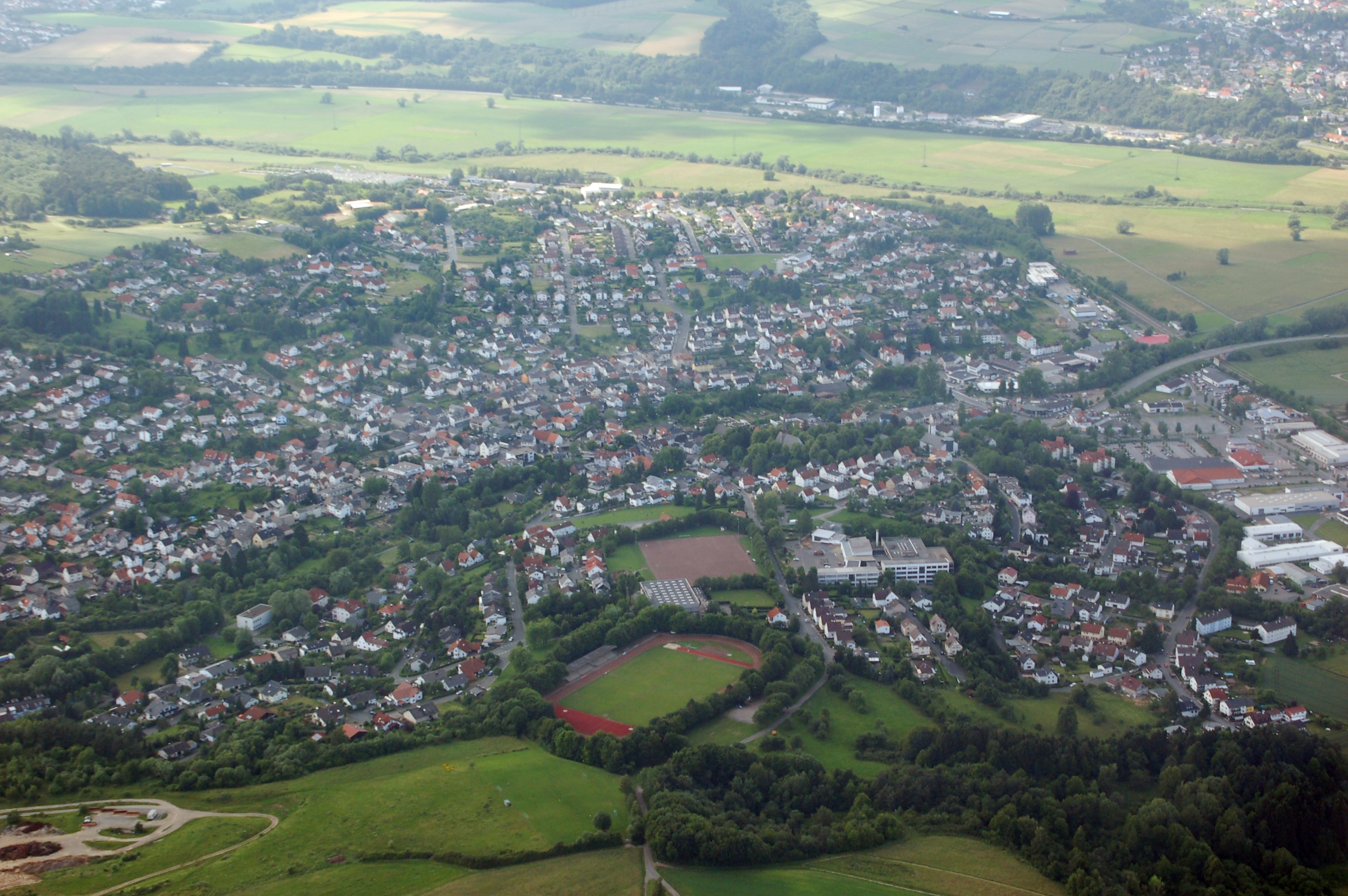
Burgsolms

Solms (German pronunciation: [zɔlms]) is a town west of Wetzlar in the Lahn-Dill-Kreis, Hessen, Germany with around 13,500 inhabitants as of 2024. In the constituent community of Burgsolms once stood the ancestral castle of the Counts and Princes of Solms.

== Geography ==
=== Location ===
Solms lies right in the Lahn valley at the mouth of the eponymous little river Solmsbach and is nestled between the foothills of both the Taunus and Westerwald at heights from 140 to 400 m above sea level. It is about 7 km west of Wetzlar and 30 km northeast of Limburg an der Lahn.

=== Neighbouring communities ===
Solms borders in the north on the community of Ehringshausen and the town of Aßlar, in the east on the town of Wetzlar, in the southeast on the community of Schöffengrund, in the southwest on the town of Braunfels and in the west on the town of Leun (all in the Lahn-Dill-Kreis).

=== Constituent communities ===
The town consists of the following centres:

- Albshausen
- Burgsolms
- Niederbiel
- Oberbiel
- Oberndorf

Solms is a town west of Wetzlar in the Lahn-Dill-Kreis, Hessen, Germany with around 13,500 inhabitants. In the constituent community of Burgsolms once stood the ancestral castle of the Counts and Princes of Solms.

== Politics ==
=== Town council ===
The municipal elections in 2011 yielded the following results:

Party	Seats
Freie Wählergruppe (FWG)	23.4
Social Democratic Party (SPD)	40.3
Christian Democratic Union (CDU)	23.0
Free Democratic Party (FDP)	2.6
Greens	10.7

Note: FWG is a citizens' coalition.

=== Town of Solms Youth Council ===
Since 2002 there has been a Town of Solms Youth Council serving as the town's official board representing youth's interests and needs. It is elected every two years by children and youths who either live in the town or go to the comprehensive school.

=== Partnerships ===
The town of Solms maintains partnerships with the following places:

- Liezen, Styria, Austria
- La Grand-Combe, Gard, France
- Schmiedefeld am Rennsteig, Thuringia, Germany

== Economy and infrastructure ==
Oberbiel is home to two commercial-industrial areas. A shipping company has set up shop at the newer one, while the older one, on an island in the river Lahn, was established in the early 20th century. It was originally home to a brad factory, a wireworks and a ball bearing factory.

County of Solms Grafschaft Solms
- 1129–1258
- Coat of arms
- Status: State of the Holy Roman Empire
- Capital: Solms
- Government: Principality
- Historical era: Middle Ages
  - Established: 1129
  - Partitioned to S-Braunfels and S-Burg-Solms: 1258
Preceded by	Succeeded by
Duchy of Franconia / Duchy of Franconia	Solms-Braunfels / Solms; Solms-Burg-Solms / Solms
- Full style: Count of Solms, Lord of Münzenberg, Wildenfels and Sonnenwalde

County of Solms: Town of Solms Grafschaft Solms-Burg-Solms
- 1258–1415
- Status: State of the Holy Roman Empire
- Capital: Solms
- Government: Principality
- Historical era: Middle Ages
  - Partitioned from Solms: 1258
  - Annexed to S-Braunfels: 1415
Preceded by	Succeeded by
Solms / County of Solms	Solms-Braunfels / Solms

== History ==
Solms had its first documentary mention in 788 in a donation document from the Lorsch Monastery. The villages that nowadays form the town of Solms belonged for centuries to the County of Solms, an independent state within the Holy Roman Empire, elevated to a county in 1223, until it was dissolved in 1806. Early branches of the House of Solms were Burgsolms (extinguished 1415), Konigsberg (near Biebertal, extinguished 1364), Old and New Hohensolms (at Hohenahr, extinguished in the 14th century) and Braunfels. The still existing lines are the princely branches of Solms-Braunfels, Solms-Hohensolms-Lich with their seat in Lich and Solms-Baruth, furthermore the Counts of Solms-Laubach with their seat in Laubach, Solms-Rödelheim-Assenheim with their seat in Assenheim, Solms-Sonnewalde and Solms-Wildenfels. The Burgsolms castle at Solms, ancestral seat of the family since around 1100, was destroyed in 1384 by a coalition of nearby towns under the leadership of Wetzlar, forcing count John to move to Greifenstein castle.

After a short while being part of the Duchy of Nassau, Solms passed to Prussia in 1815.

As part of Hesse's municipal reforms, the communities of Albshausen and Oberbiel voluntarily merged on 1 July 1971 to form Bielhausen, while Burgsolms and Oberndorf did the same to form Solms. By state law, these two new communities were amalgamated with Niederbiel on 1 January 1977 to make the new greater community of Solms, which in 1978 was granted town rights.

A new residential area has been being built on the western edge of Oberbiel since the 1990s.

== Sightseeing ==
- Kloster Altenberg (Altenberg Monastery) - Burial place of the blessed Gertrud von Altenberg (1227-1297), Saint Elisabeth's daughter
- Grube Fortuna (Oberbiel) - Visitors' Mine including a light and mine railway museum (Iron ore was mined here until 1983.)
- Stone Bench (Oberbiel Forest) - A secluded place, that may have originally served as a hunting post
- Jewish Cemetery (Burgsolms) - Tombstones from 1705 to 1939
- Gallows of Solms (Forest between Burgsolms/Oberndorf and Albshausen) - Memorial against death penalty: Erected in stone in 1750, the gallows has never been used for an execution.
- Schäferburg ("Shepherd's castle", Niederbiel) - Log cabin and barbecue area on the edge of the forest (Westerwald side) overlooking the city and the Lahn valley
- Former Hunting Lodge Dr. Roth, later a children's home (Albshausen) - A kind of counterpart to Niederbiel's "Schäferburg" on the Taunus side (built around 1920)
- Old Station Braunfels-Oberndorf (Oberndorf) - Representative building on the disused Solmsbach-valley-route to Brandoberndorf

== Images ==
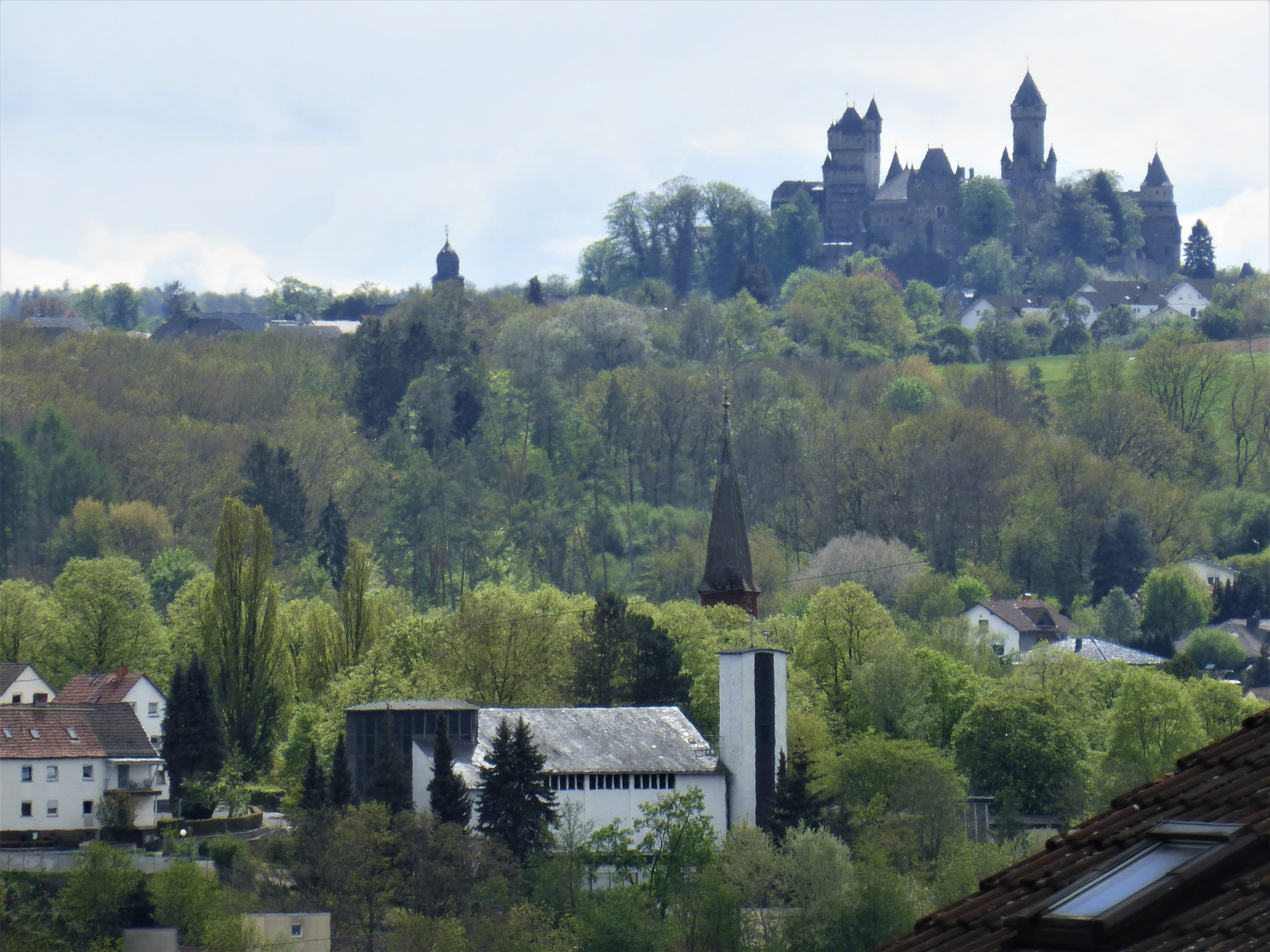
The churches of Burgsolms in front of Braunfels castle

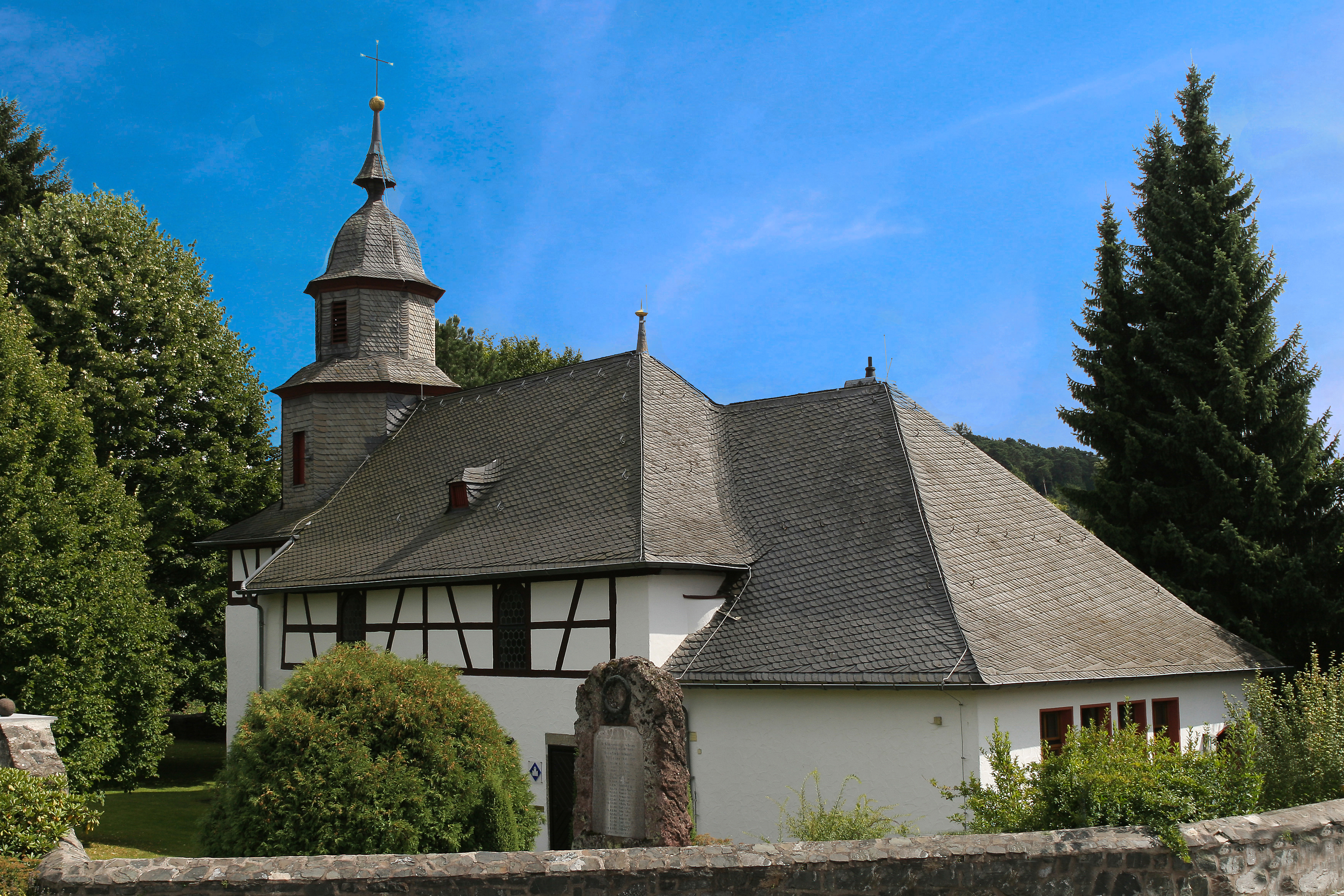
Oberndorf

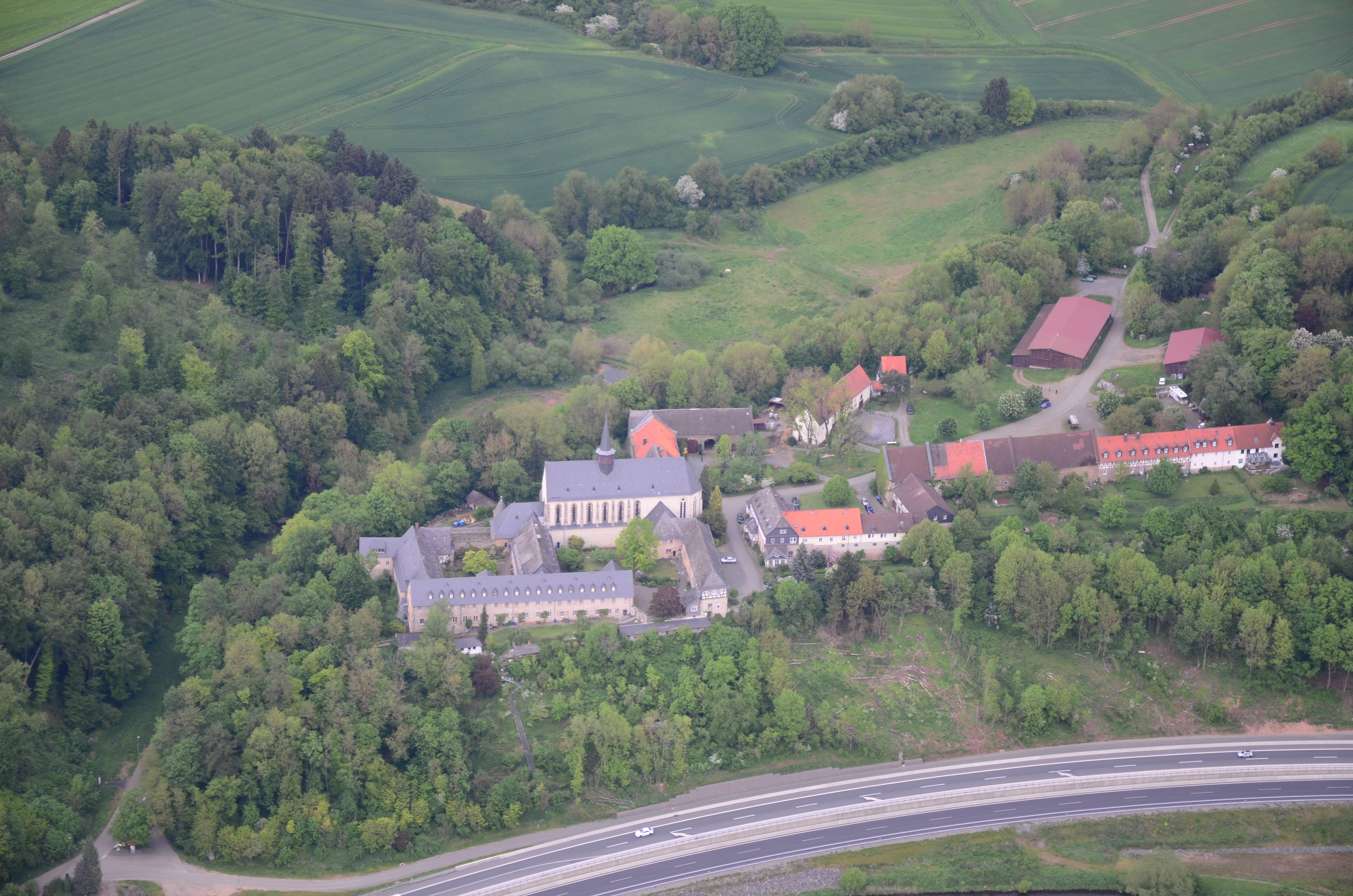
Altenberg Abbey

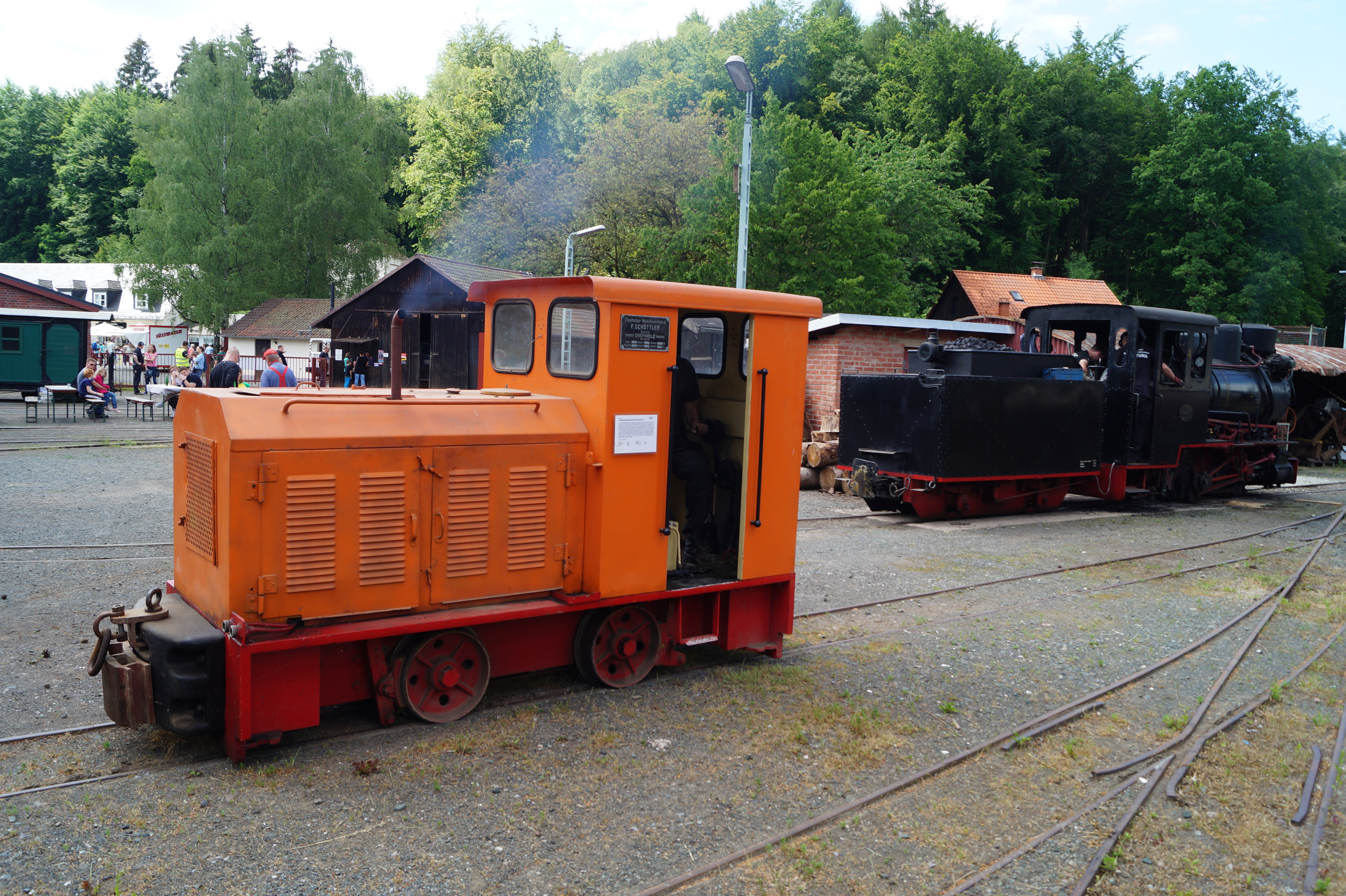
Visitors' Mine Fortuna

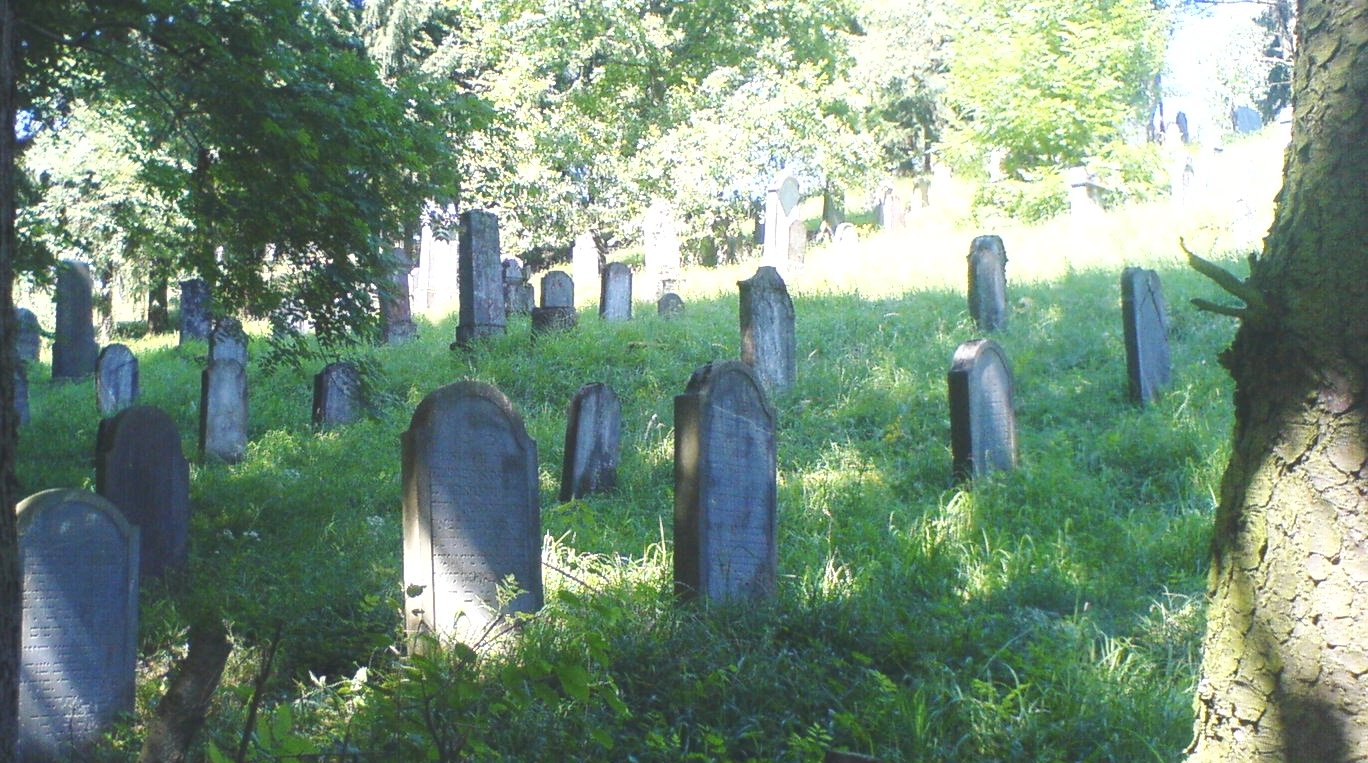
Jewish Cemetery

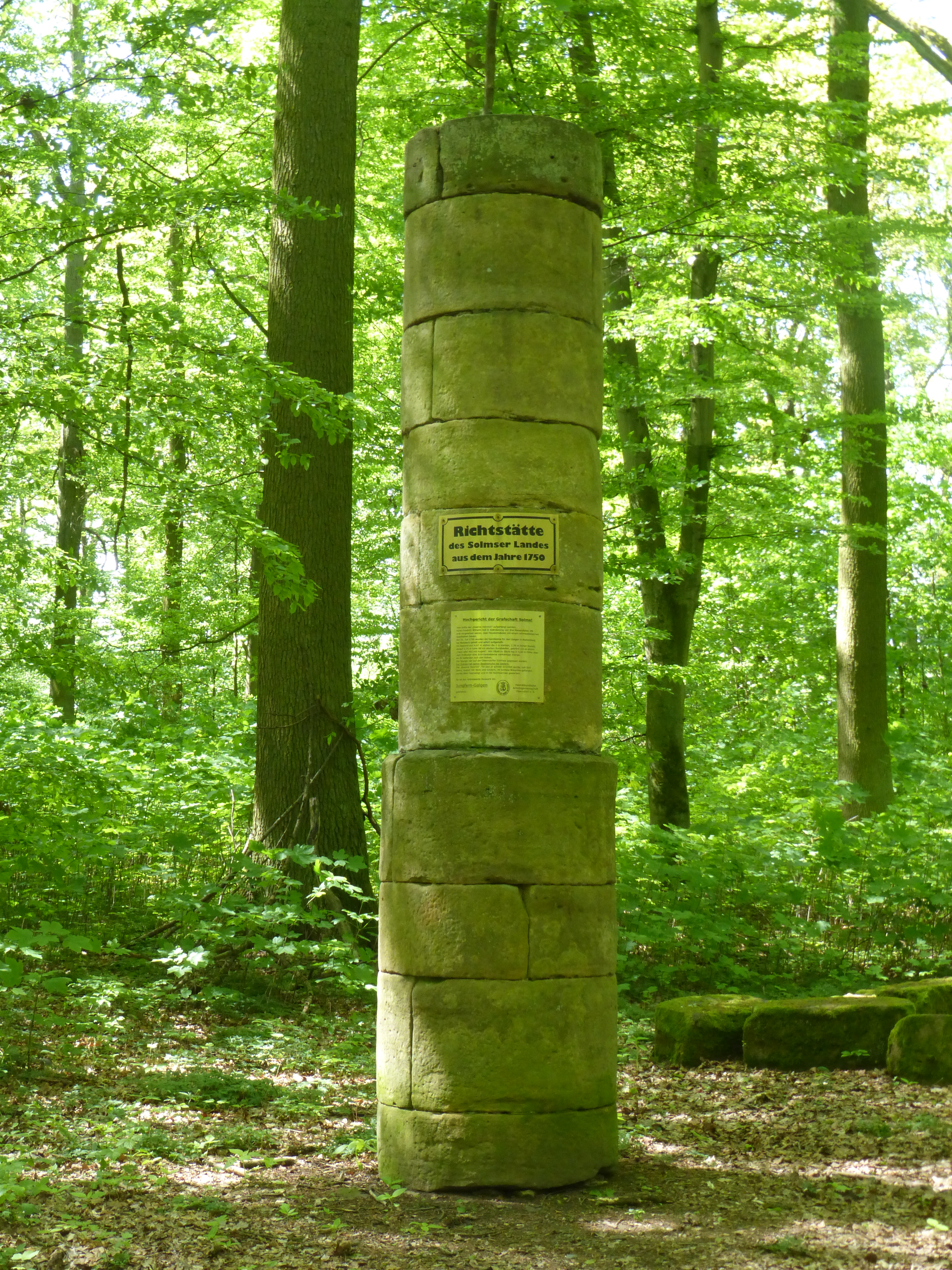
Gallows

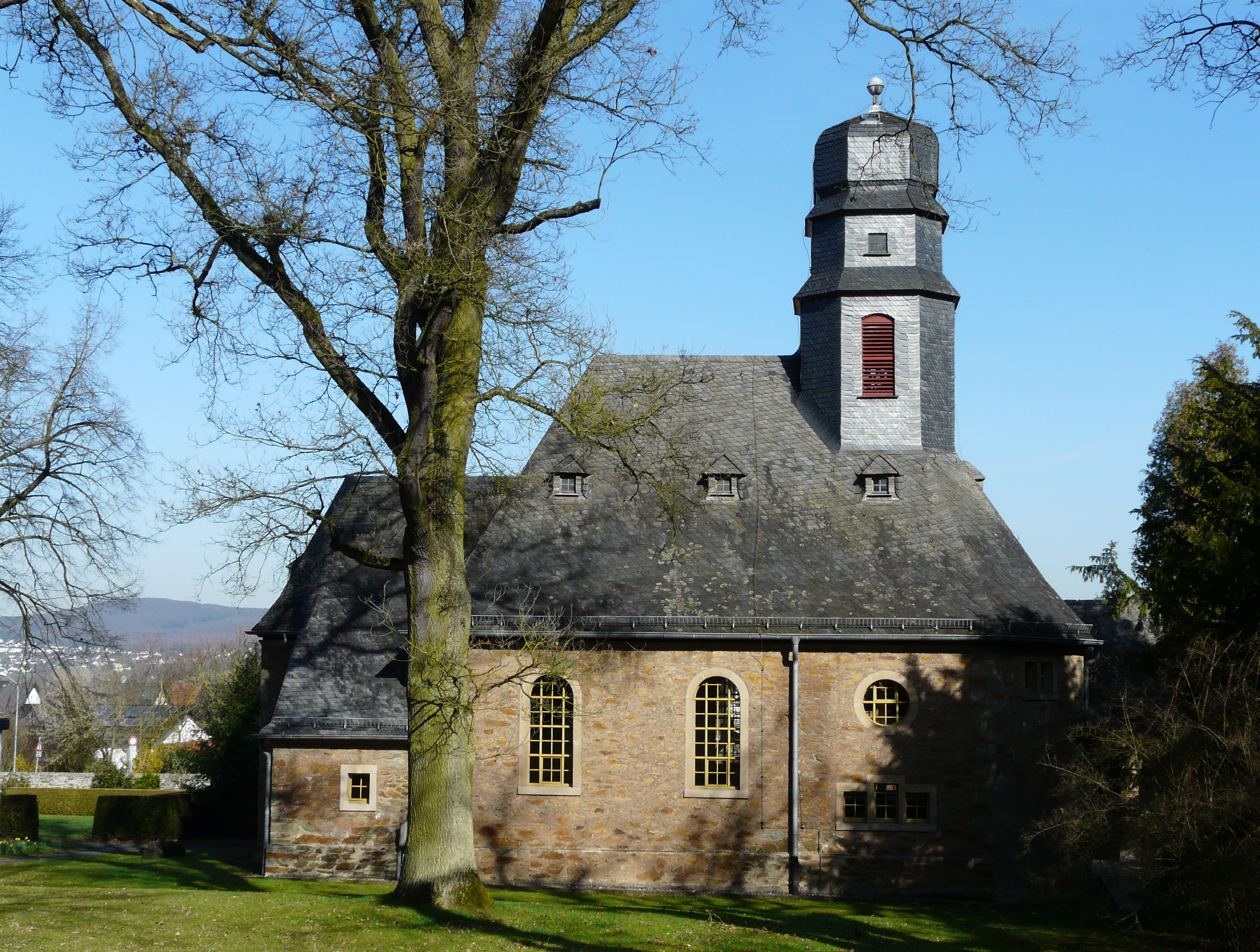
Albshausen church

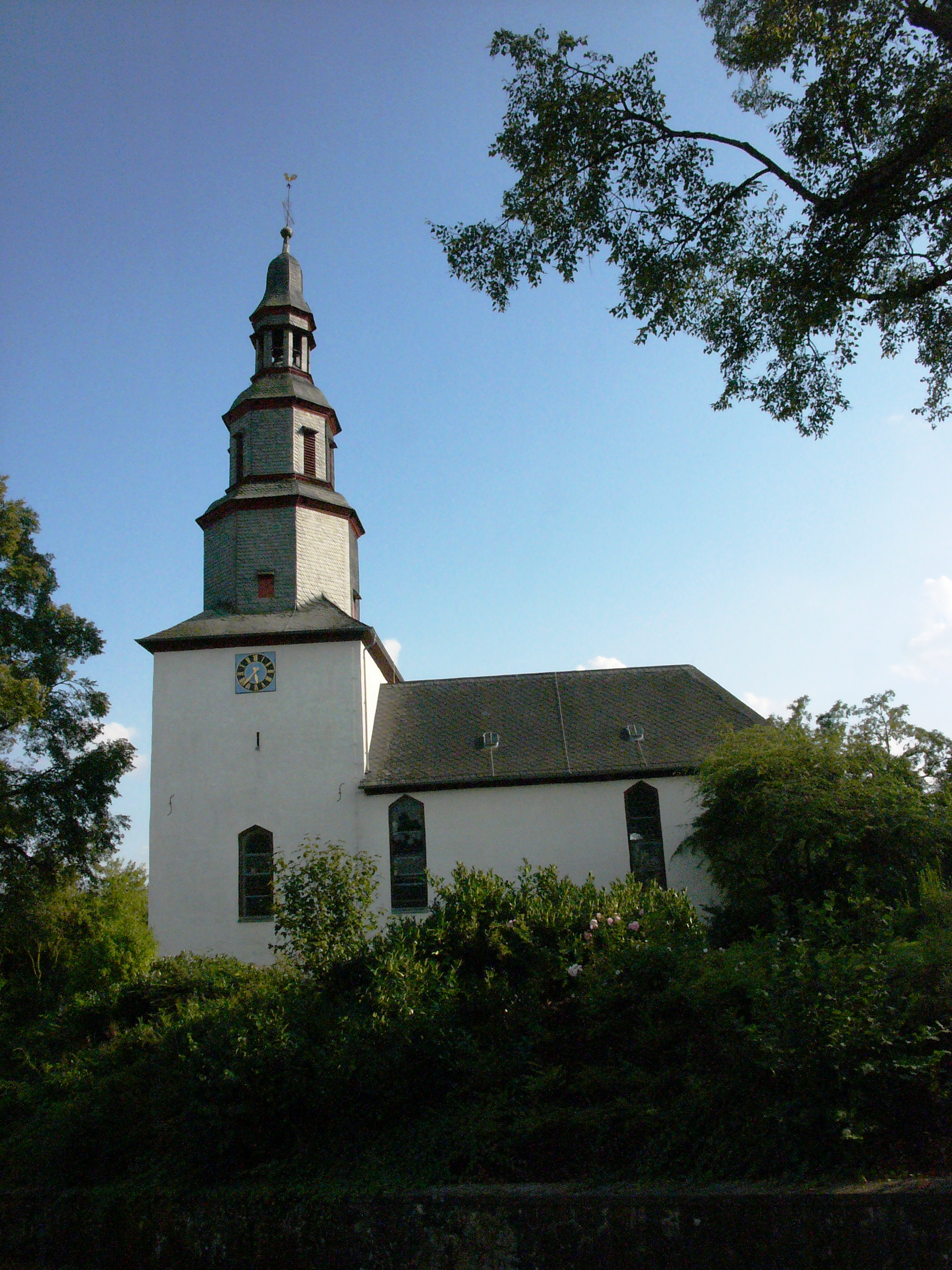
Niederbiel church
