= Princess Sophie of Saxe-Weimar-Eisenach (1911–1988) =

Princess Sophie
- Princess consort of Schwarzburg
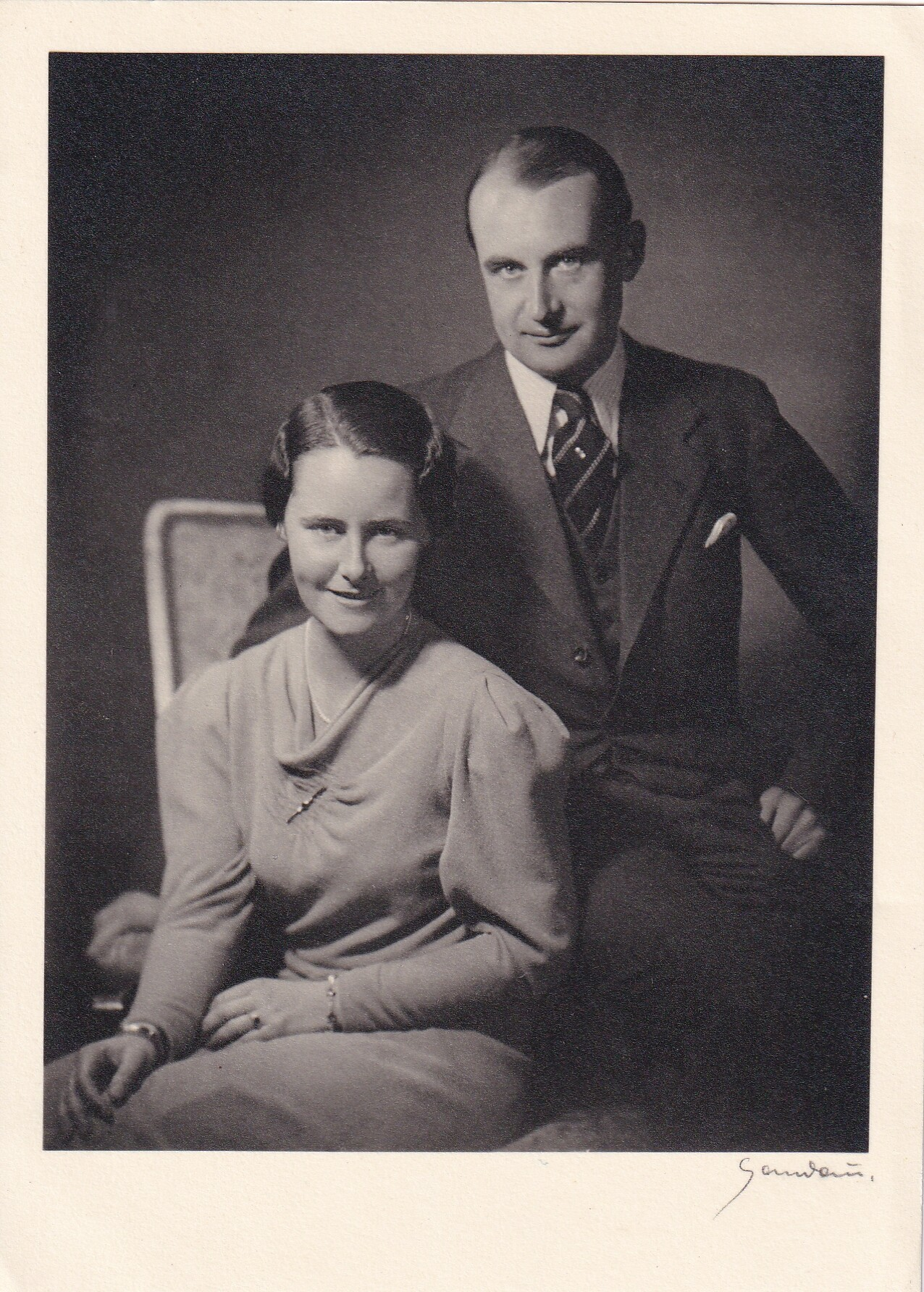
- Sophie and her husband Friedrich Günther, 1938
- Born: 20 March 1911; Weimar, Saxe-Weimar-Eisenach
- Died: 21 November 1988 (aged 77); Hamburg, West Germany
- Spouse: Friedrich Günther, Prince of Schwarzburg (m. 1938; div. 1938)
Names
- German: Sophie Luise Adelheid Marie Olga Carola
- House: Saxe-Weimar-Eisenach
- Father: William Ernest, Grand Duke of Saxe-Weimar-Eisenach
- Mother: Princess Feodora of Saxe-Meiningen

Princess Sophie Louise of Saxe-Weimar-Eisenach (20 March 1911 – 21 November 1988) was a princess of the House of Saxe-Weimar-Eisenach. She was born in Weimar, the eldest child and only daughter of William Ernest, Grand Duke of Saxe-Weimar-Eisenach, by his second wife, Princess Feodora of Saxe-Meiningen.

As a relative of Wilhelmina of the Netherlands, Sophie was invited to the 1937 wedding of her daughter, Princess Juliana, as a bridesmaid. She became entangled in a diplomatic scandal however after the passports of Sophie and two other German princesses were withheld by the Nazi government. Though they were later released, Sophie opted out of attending at the last moment. In 1938 Sophie married Friedrich Günther, Prince of Schwarzburg, but the couple were divorced by the end of the year.

== Juliana's wedding ==
=== Invitation ===
Preparations for the wedding of Queen Wilhelmina of the Netherlands's only child Crown Princess Juliana to the German Prince Bernhard of Lippe-Biesterfeld were under way in 1937 when a small diplomatic scandal occurred.

The affair was the result of Wilhelmina's opinion that the wedding be a family affair; consequently, she did not invite foreign royalty unless she was personally familiar with them. As a result, Juliana's chosen bridesmaids were either her relatives or family friends. These included Sophie herself (her and Bernhard's second cousin), Duchess Thyra of Mecklenburg-Schwerin (her second cousin), Grand Duchess Kira Kirillovna of Russia (her first cousin once removed), Duchess Woizlawa of Mecklenburg (her cousin), and two of Bernhard's first cousins, Princess Sieglinde of Lippe and Princess Elisabeth of Lippe.

=== Diplomatic scandal ===
Sophie became entangled in the small diplomatic scandal as preparations for the Dutch wedding commenced. The German Nazi government, apparently outraged that their flag was not used in festivities related to the wedding, refused to release the passports of Sophie, along with those of Bernard's cousins Princesses Sieglinde and Elizabeth zur Lippe. The German government stated that they were also protesting supposed anti-Nazi incidents in the Netherlands, and was angry that Juliana's German fiancé Prince Bernhard had not publicly defended the Nazi regime there. Wilhelmina and the Dutch government responded that because they believed the wedding to be a private, family affair, the use of the German flag would be inappropriate; they instead opted to fly the Dutch national flag alongside the flag of Bernhard's family. German displeasure also applied to their national anthem; Wilhelmina and the Dutch government saw no need in playing it at the wedding, as Bernhard was now a Dutch citizen, and thus no longer held German citizenship. A note of protest was sent to Berlin, declaring that the withholding of the necessary documents was "an insult to the Queen". Though the Dutch minister to Berlin apologized for one of the incidents concerning the Nazi flag (in which it was taken from a German school in the Hague), the Nazi government regarded his statement as "insufficient". The passports were not released until Prince Bernhard sent a personal letter to German Chancellor Adolf Hitler.

Though the passports were released, Sophie for unknown reasons revoked her acceptance and stated she could no longer attend the wedding at the last moment. Plans for the ceremony continued regardless, with Juliana getting married on 7 January 1937. Princess Sophie was replaced as bridesmaid by Baroness von Heeckeren van Kell, one of Juliana's ladies-in-waiting.

== Marriage ==
On 7 March 1938 at Heinrichau, Schlesien, Sophie married Friedrich Günther, Prince of Schwarzburg. He had held that title since the death of his father Sizzo, Prince of Schwarzburg on 24 March 1926.

The marriage would prove short-lived and less than a year later on 1 November 1938 they were divorced. Friedrich Günther never remarried nor produced a legitimate issue. Consequently, his sister Marie Antoinette controversially succeeded him as Princess of Schwarzburg.

Sophie died on 21 November 1988 in Hamburg.

== Ancestry ==
Ancestors of Princess Sophie of Saxe-Weimar-Eisenach (1911–1988)

8. Charles Alexander, Grand Duke of Saxe-Weimar-Eisenach
4. Charles Augustus, Hereditary Grand Duke of Saxe-Weimar-Eisenach
9. Princess Sophie of the Netherlands
2. William Ernest, Grand Duke of Saxe-Weimar-Eisenach
10. Prince Hermann of Saxe-Weimar-Eisenach
5. Princess Pauline of Saxe-Weimar-Eisenach
11. Princess Augusta of Württemberg
1. Princess Sophie of Saxe-Weimar-Eisenach
12. Georg II, Duke of Saxe-Meiningen
6. Prince Friedrich of Saxe-Meiningen
13. Princess Feodora of Hohenlohe-Langenburg
3. Princess Feodora of Saxe-Meiningen
14. Ernest, Count of Lippe-Biesterfeld
7. Countess Adelaide of Lippe-Biesterfeld
15. Countess Karoline von Wartensleben

Princess Sophie of Saxe-Weimar-Eisenach (1911–1988) House of Saxe-Weimar-Eisenach Cadet branch of the House of Wettin Born: 20 March 1911 Died: 21 November 1988
Titles in pretence
Vacant Title last held by Princess Alexandra of Anhalt	— TITULAR — Princess consort of Schwarzburg; 7 March 1938 – 1 November 1938; Reason for succession failure: Principality abolished in 1918	Schwarzburg male line extinct in 1971
