= Princess Antoinette of Saxe-Altenburg =

Antoinette
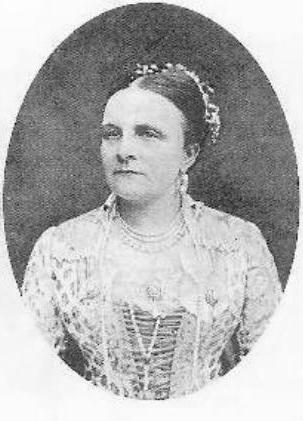

Duchess consort of Anhalt
- Tenure: 22 May 1871 – 24 January 1904
- Born: 17 April 1838; Bamberg, Kingdom of Bavaria
- Died: 13 October 1908 (aged 70); Berchtesgaden, Kingdom of Bavaria, German Empire
- Spouse: Friedrich I, Duke of Anhalt (m. 1854; died 1904)
- Issue: Leopold, Hereditary Prince of Anhalt; Friedrich II, Duke of Anhalt; Elisabeth, Grand Duchess of Mecklenburg-Strelitz; Eduard, Duke of Anhalt; Prince Aribert; Alexandra, Princess of Schwarzburg
Names
- Antoinette Charlotte Marie Josephine Karoline Frida
- House: Saxe-Altenburg
- Father: Prince Eduard of Saxe-Altenburg
- Mother: Princess Amalie of Hohenzollern-Sigmaringen

Princess Antoinette of Saxe-Altenburg (17 April 1838 – 13 October 1908) was a princess of Saxe-Altenburg by birth and Duchess of Anhalt by marriage.

== Biography ==
Antoinette was the second child of Prince Eduard of Saxe-Altenburg from his first marriage with Amalie, daughter of Karl, Prince of Hohenzollern-Sigmaringen.

She married on 22 April 1854 in Altenburg the future Friedrich I, Duke of Anhalt. The marriage was for dynastic reasons, and Antoinette married one of the richest German princes. On the occasion of the marriage, was coined a commemorative medal.

After falling ill with diphtheria in the spring of 1890, during which she was cared for by Lutheran deaconesses in Halle, she campaigned for the Duke of Anhalt to donate a plot of land in Gernrode to the Halle deaconesses in autumn 1890 for the construction of a convalescent home. Two years later, together with her daughter-in-law, Princess Marie of Baden, she marked the foundation of the Anhaltische Diakonissenanstalt.

The streets Antoinettenweg in Selketal, Antoinettenstraße in Dessau and the Antoinettenlyceum school are named after the Duchess.

=== Issue ===
Antoinette and Friedrich had six children:

1. Leopold, Hereditary Prince of Anhalt (1855–1886), married Princess Elisabeth of Hesse-Kassel in 1884.
2. Friedrich II, Duke of Anhalt (1856–1918), married Princess Marie of Baden in 1889.
3. Princess Elisabeth of Anhalt (1857–1933), married Adolf Friedrich V, Grand Duke of Mecklenburg in Strelitz in 1877.
4. Eduard, Duke of Anhalt (1861–1918), married Princess Luise of Saxe-Altenburg in 1895.
5. Prince Aribert of Anhalt (1866–1933), married Princess Marie Louise of Schleswig-Holstein in 1891.
6. Princess Alexandra of Anhalt (1868–1958), married Sizzo, Prince of Schwarzburg in 1897.

Princess Antoinette of Saxe-Altenburg House of Saxe-Altenburg Born: 28 June 1845 Died: 13 October 1908
Regnal titles
Preceded by Princess Frederica of Prussia as Duchess consort of Anhalt-Dessau	Duchess consort of Anhalt; 22 May 1871 – 23 January 1904	Succeeded by Princess Marie of Baden
