= Frederick I of Anhalt =

Duke of Anhalt from 1871 to 1904

Frederick I
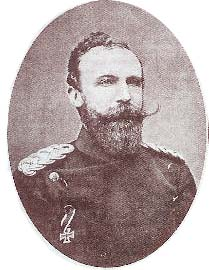
- Frederick I, Duke of Anhalt

Duke of Anhalt
- Reign: 22 May 1871 – 24 January 1904
- Predecessor: Leopold IV
- Successor: Frederick II
- Born: 29 April 1831; Dessau, Anhalt
- Died: 24 January 1904 (aged 72); Ballenstedt, Anhalt
- Spouse: Princess Antoinette of Saxe-Altenburg (m. 1854)
- Issue: Leopold, Hereditary Prince of Anhalt; Friedrich II, Duke of Anhalt; Elisabeth, Grand Duchess of Mecklenburg-Strelitz; Eduard, Duke of Anhalt; Prince Aribert; Alexandra, Princess of Schwarzburg
Names
- German: Leopold Friedrich Franz Nikolaus
- House: Ascania
- Father: Leopold IV, Duke of Anhalt
- Mother: Princess Frederica of Prussia

Frederick I (German: Herzog Friedrich I von Anhalt) (29 April 1831 – 24 January 1904) was a German prince of the house of Ascania who ruled the Duchy of Anhalt from 1871 to 1904.

== Early life ==
Frederick was born in Dessau in 1831 as the third child and only son of Duke Leopold IV of Anhalt-Dessau and his wife Princess Frederica of Prussia, the daughter of Prince Louis Charles of Prussia.

He studied in Bonn and Geneva, and in 1851 entered the Prussian military at Potsdam.

In 1863 he became heir to the united Duchy of Anhalt, when his father Leopold IV had inherited all the Anhalt territories following the death of the last Duke of Anhalt-Bernburg.

In 1864, he participated in the Second Schleswig War in the staff of his brother-in-law, Prince Frederic Charles of Prussia, and in 1870–71 in the Franco-Prussian War as Lieutenant General. He was present at the proclamation of Wilhelm I as German Emperor in the Hall of Mirrors at the Versailles Palace on 18 January 1871.

== Reign ==
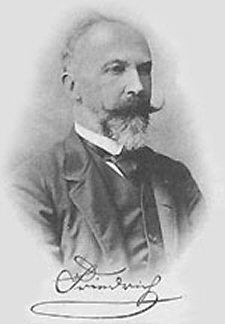
Duke Frederick I of Anhalt

Frederick succeeded his father as Duke of Anhalt on 22 May 1871.

On 23 January 1904 he suffered an apoplectic stroke and died the next day at Ballenstedt castle. As his eldest son Leopold had predeceased him, he was succeeded as duke by his second son who became Frederick II.

== Family ==
=== Marriage and issue ===
He was married on 22 April 1854 at Altenburg to Princess Antoinette of Saxe-Altenburg. She was a daughter of Prince Eduard of Saxe-Altenburg and his wife Princess Amalie of Hohenzollern-Sigmaringen. They had six children:

Name	Birth	Death	Notes
Leopold, Hereditary Prince of Anhalt	18 July 1855	2 February 1886	married Princess Elisabeth of Hesse-Kassel; had issue
Friedrich II, Duke of Anhalt	19 August 1856	22 April 1918	married Princess Marie of Baden, no issue
Princess Elisabeth of Anhalt	7 September 1857	20 July 1933	married Adolf Friedrich V, Grand Duke of Mecklenburg-Strelitz; had issue
Eduard, Duke of Anhalt	18 April 1861	13 September 1918	married Princess Luise of Saxe-Altenburg; had issue
Prince Aribert of Anhalt	18 June 1866	24 December 1933	married Princess Marie Louise of Schleswig-Holstein, no issue
Princess Alexandra of Anhalt	4 April 1868	26 August 1958	married Sizzo, Prince of Schwarzburg; had issue

== Honours ==
German orders and decorations

- Ascanian duchies: Grand Cross of the Order of Albert the Bear, 18 March 1837; with Swords, 1 October 1864
- Baden:
  - Knight of the House Order of Fidelity, 1889
  - Knight of the Order of Berthold the First, 1889
- Bavaria: Knight of St. Hubert
- Brunswick: Grand Cross of the Order of Henry the Lion, 1887
- (Saxe-Coburg and Gotha) (Duchy of Saxe-Altenburg) (Saxe-Meiningen) Ernestine duchies: Grand Cross of the Saxe-Ernestine House Order
- (Kingdom of Hanover) Hanoverian Royal Family:
  - Grand Cross of the Royal Guelphic Order
  - Grand Cross of the Order of Ernst August
- Hesse and by Rhine: Grand Cross of the Ludwig Order, 14 January 1884
- Mecklenburg: Grand Cross of the Wendish Crown, with Crown in Ore and Collar
- Nassau: Knight of the Gold Lion of Nassau, September 1858
- Oldenburg: Grand Cross of the Order of Duke Peter Friedrich Ludwig, with Golden Crown, 7 October 1847
- Saxe-Weimar-Eisenach: Grand Cross of the White Falcon
- Saxony: Knight of the Rue Crown, 1856
- Württemberg: Grand Cross of the Württemberg Crown, 1889
- Prussia:
  - Knight of the Black Eagle, with Collar, 1 December 1854
  - Knight of the Red Eagle, 1st Class, 20 May 1850; with Swords, 1864
  - Iron Cross (1870), 2nd Class
  - Member of Honour of the Johanniter Order, 1877
  - Grand Commander's Cross of the Royal House Order of Hohenzollern
- Hohenzollern: Cross of Honour of the Princely House Order of Hohenzollern, 1st Class
- Schaumburg-Lippe: Military Merit Medal, with Swords

Foreign orders and decorations

- Austrian Empire:
  - Grand Cross of the Imperial Order of Leopold, 1852
  - Grand Cross of the Royal Hungarian Order of St. Stephen, 1871
- Belgium: Grand Cordon of the Order of Leopold (military), 22 February 1874
- Denmark: Knight of the Elephant, 22 March 1873
- Kingdom of Greece: Grand Cross of the Redeemer
- Kingdom of Romania: Grand Cross of the Star of Romania
- Principality of Serbia: Grand Cross of the Cross of Takovo
- Sweden-Norway:
  - Knight of the Seraphim, 13 March 1873
  - Commander Grand Cross of the Sword, 30 June 1869

== Ancestry ==
Ancestors of Frederick I of Anhalt

8. Leopold III, Duke of Anhalt-Dessau
4. Frederick, Hereditary Prince of Anhalt-Dessau
9. Princess Louise of Brandenburg-Schwedt
2. Leopold IV, Duke of Anhalt
10. Frederick V, Landgrave of Hesse-Homburg
5. Princess Amalie of Hesse-Homburg
11. Princess Caroline of Hesse-Darmstadt
1. Frederick I, Duke of Anhalt
12. Frederick William II of Prussia
6. Prince Louis Charles of Prussia
13. Princess Frederica Louisa of Hesse-Darmstadt
3. Princess Frederica of Prussia
14. Charles II, Grand Duke of Mecklenburg-Strelitz
7. Frederica of Mecklenburg-Strelitz
15. Princess Friederike of Hesse-Darmstadt

Frederick I of Anhalt House of Ascania Born: 29 April 1831 Died: 24 January 1904
Regnal titles
Preceded by Leopold IV	Duke of Anhalt; 1871–1904	Succeeded by Frederick II
