= Wildenfels =

- Town
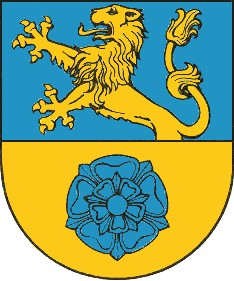
- Coat of arms

- Location of Wildenfels within Zwickau district
- Interactive map of Wildenfels
- Location within Germany Location within Saxony
- Coordinates: 50°39′27″N 12°34′58″E
- Country: Germany
- State: Saxony
- District: Zwickau
- Subdivisions: 5

Government
  - Mayor (2021–28): Tino Kögler

Area
  - Total: 20.69 km^{2} (7.99 sq mi)
- Elevation: 353 m (1,158 ft)

Population (2025-12-31)
  - Total: 3,388
  - Density: 163.8/km^{2} (424.1/sq mi)
- Time zone: UTC+01:00 (CET)
  - Summer (DST): UTC+02:00 (CEST)
- Postal codes: 08134
- Dialling codes: 037603
- Vehicle registration: Z
- Website: www.wildenfels.de

Wildenfels (German pronunciation: [ˈvɪldn̩ˌfɛls]) is a municipality in Germany, Landkreis Zwickau in Saxony. It is situated 9 km southeast of Zwickau.

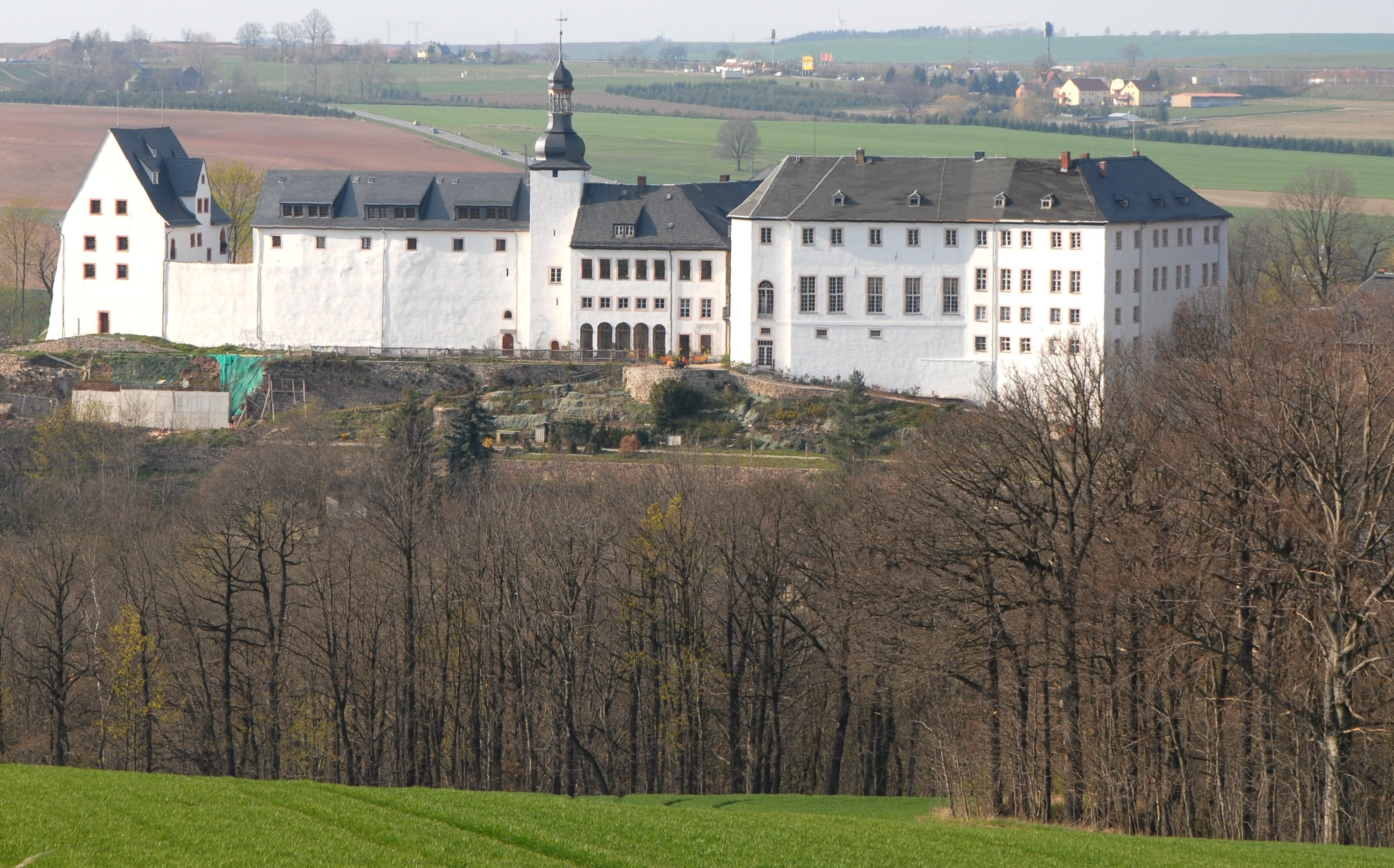
Wildenfels Castle

The construction of Wildenfels castle was begun before 1200 by the lords of Wildenfels. Between 1440 and 1706 it was a fief with Imperial immediacy. In 1602 it passed to the House of Solms which established the branch of Solms-Wildenfels. The counts of Solms-Wildenfels resided there until communist expropriation in 1945. Presently the castle is used for weddings and other events, partially for housing, the courtyards are accessible.
