= Solms-Wildenfels =

County of Solms-Wildenfels Grafschaft Solms-Wildenfels
- 1696–1806
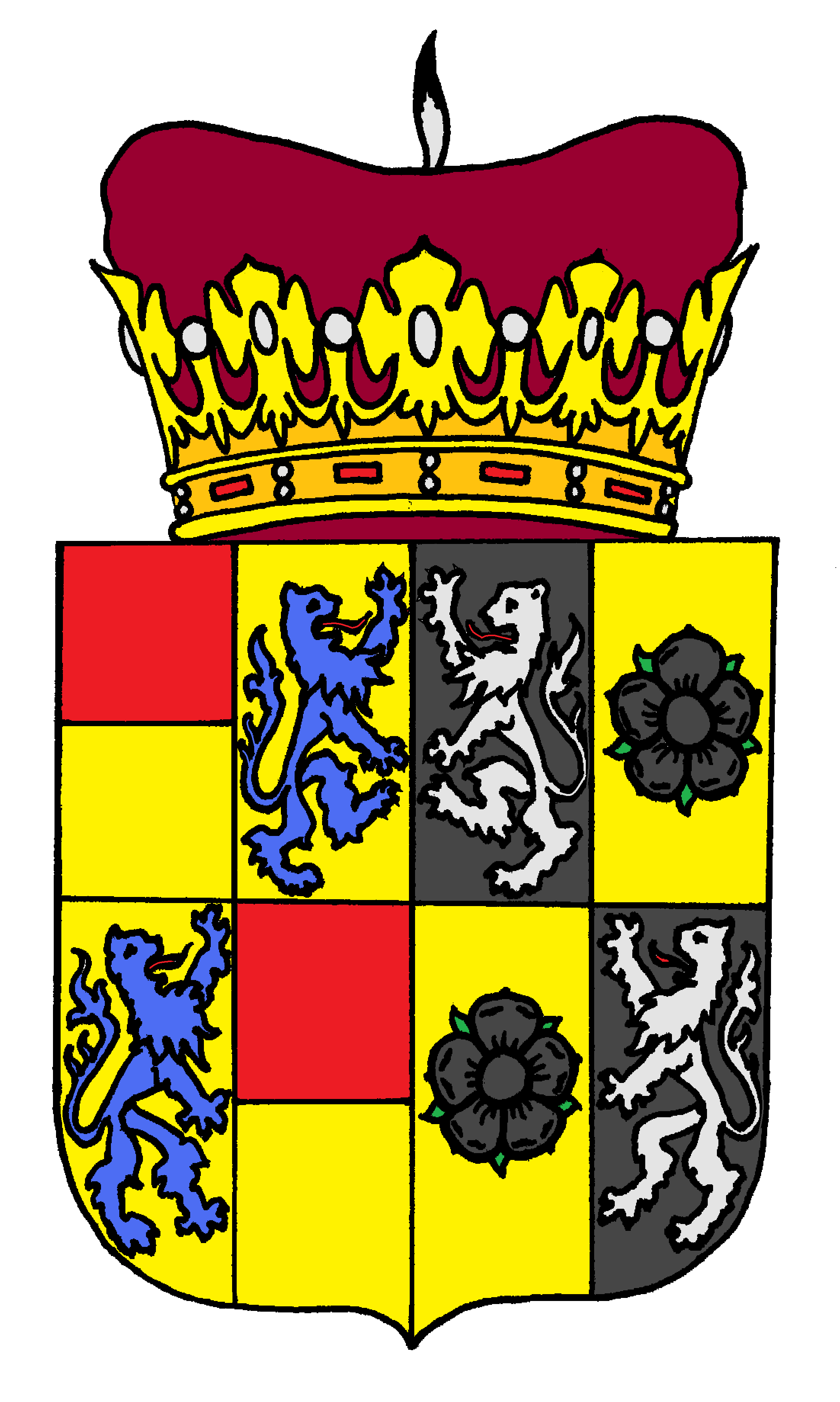
- Coat of arms
- Status: State of the Holy Roman Empire
- Capital: Wildenfels
- Government: Principality
- Historical era: Middle Ages
  - Partitioned from Solms-Baruth: 1696
  - Partitioned to create Solms-Sachsenfeld: 1741
  - Mediatised to Hesse: 1806
  - Reintegrated into Solms-Sachsenfeld: 1896
Preceded by	Succeeded by
Solms / Solms-Baruth	Grand Duchy of Hesse

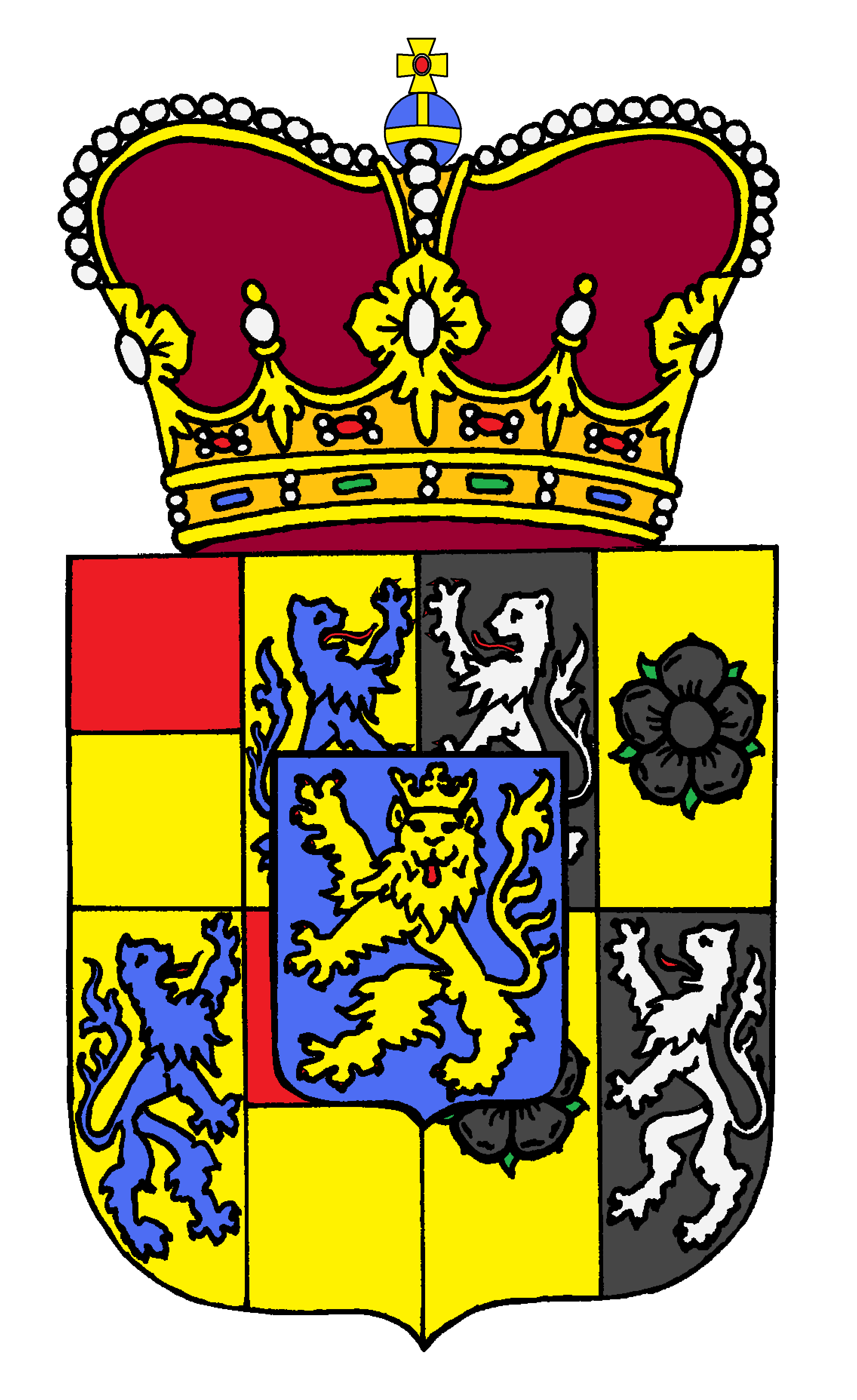
Schwarzburg-Solms-Wildenfels coat of arms

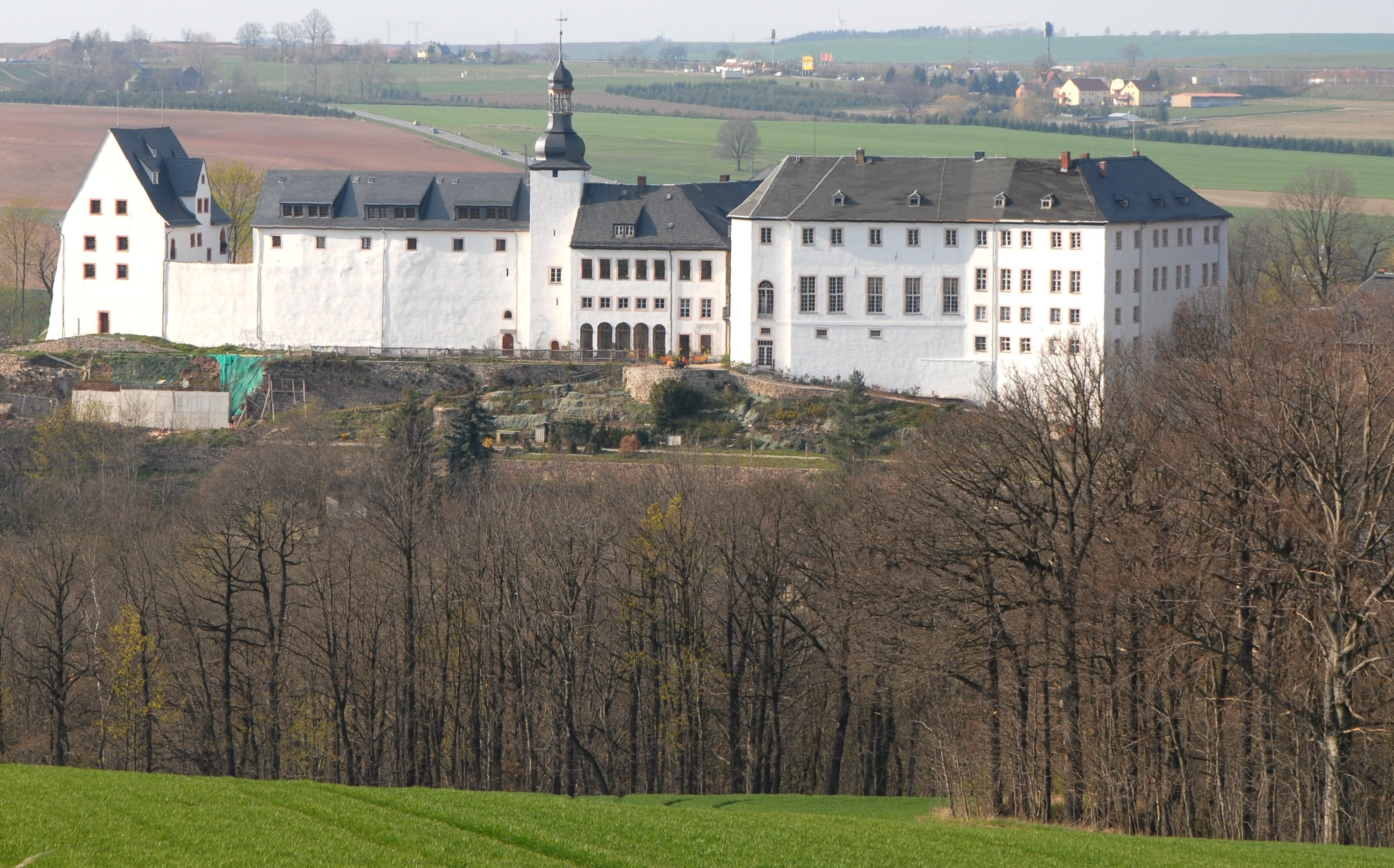
Wildenfels Castle

Solms-Wildenfels was a minor county around Wildenfels in south-western Saxony, Germany. The House of Solms had its origins at Solms, Hesse.

== History ==
Solms-Wildenfels was a partition of Solms-Baruth. In 1741 it was partitioned between itself and Solms-Sachsenfeld, and reintegrated that county upon its extinction in 1896. Solms-Wildenfels was mediatised to Hesse-Darmstadt in 1806.

== Counts of Solms-Wildenfels (1696–1806) ==
- Otto Henry William (1696–1741)
- Henry Charles (1741–46)
- Frederick Magnus I (1746–1801)
- Frederick Magnus II (1801–06)

== Mediatized Counts of Solms-Wildenfels ==
- Friedrich Magnus II (1806–1857)
- Friedrich Magnus III (1857–1883)
- Friedrich Magnus IV (1883–1910)
- Friedrich Magnus V (1910–1945), married Princess Marie Antoinette of Schwarzburg, who presumably became the head of the House of Schwarzburg in 1971. Following her brother's death in 1971 in the House of Schwarzburg became extinct in the male line. However the Schwarzburg principalities operated under Semi-Salic primogeniture which means that in the event of the extinction of all male dynasts, as happened with the death of Prince Friedrich Günther, females can inherit.
- Friedrich Magnus VI (1945-) : upon his mother's death in 1984, Friedrich Magnus VI inherited a claim to the headship of the House of Schwarzburg under semi-Salic law.
