= Großharthau =

- Municipality
- Location of Großharthau within Bautzen district
- Interactive map of Großharthau
- Location within Germany Location within Saxony
- Coordinates: 51°07′N 14°06′E
- Country: Germany
- State: Saxony
- District: Bautzen
- Subdivisions: 4

Government
  - Mayor (2022–29): Jens Krauße (SPD)

Area
  - Total: 37.27 km^{2} (14.39 sq mi)
- Elevation: 270 m (890 ft)

Population (2025-12-31)
  - Total: 2,945
  - Density: 79.02/km^{2} (204.7/sq mi)
- Time zone: UTC+01:00 (CET)
  - Summer (DST): UTC+02:00 (CEST)
- Postal codes: 01909
- Dialling codes: 035954, 035200 Seeligstadt
- Vehicle registration: BZ, BIW, HY, KM
- Website: www.grossharthau.de

Großharthau (Upper Sorbian: Wjelikoharć) is a municipality in the east of Saxony, Germany. It belongs to the district of Bautzen and lies southwest of the eponymous city.

== Geography ==
The municipality is situated at the northern edge of the Lausitzer Bergland (Lusatian Hills), near Bischofswerda.

== Villages ==
Several villages belong to the municipality:

- Großharthau
- Bühlau
- Schmiedefeld
- Seeligstadt
