= Princess Frederica of Prussia, Duchess of Anhalt-Dessau =

Duchess of Anhalt-Dessau (1796–1850)

Princess Frederica
- Duchess consort of Anhalt-Dessau
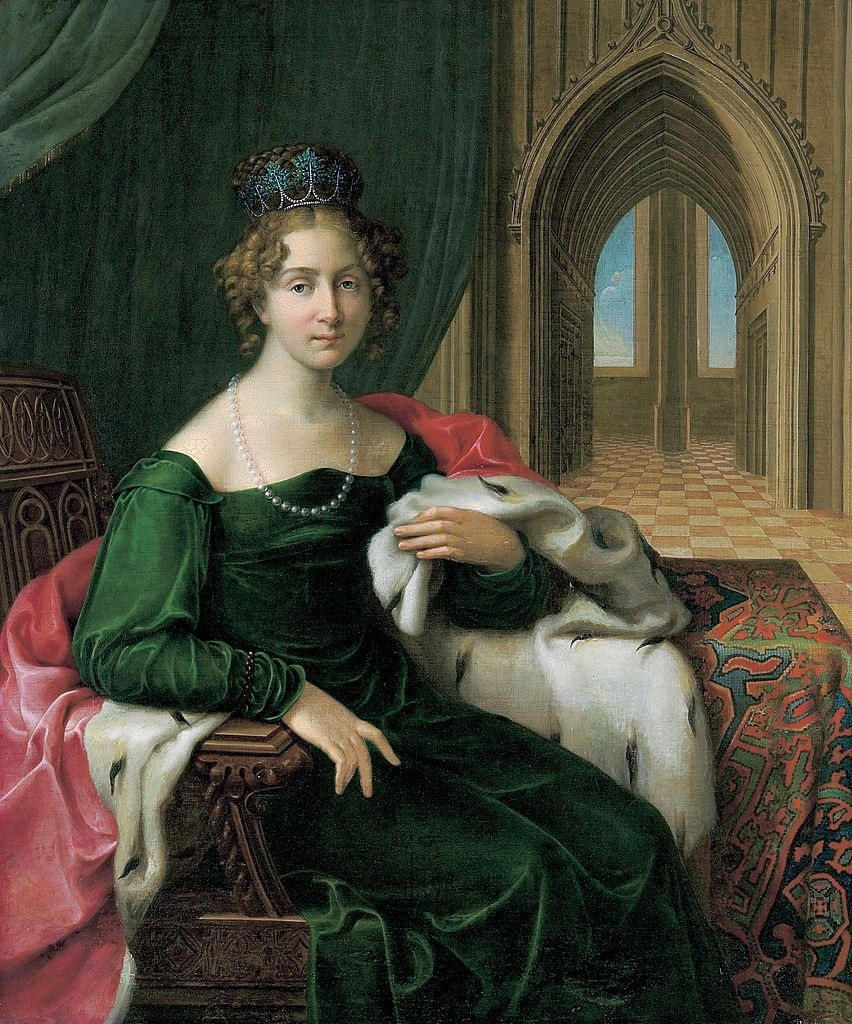
- Born: 30 September 1796; Berlin
- Died: 1 January 1850 (aged 53); Dessau
- Spouse: Leopold IV, Duke of Anhalt-Dessau (m. 1818)
- Issue: Princess Auguste of Anhalt-Dessau; Agnes, Duchess of Saxe-Altenburg; Frederick I, Duke of Anhalt; Maria Anna, Princess Friedrich Karl of Prussia
Names
- German: Friederike Luise Wilhelmine Amalie
- House: Hohenzollern
- Father: Prince Louis Charles of Prussia
- Mother: Frederica of Mecklenburg-Strelitz

Princess Frederica of Prussia (30 September 1796 – 1 January 1850) was a daughter of Prince Louis Charles of Prussia and Frederica of Mecklenburg-Strelitz. She was a member of the House of Hohenzollern. By her marriage to Leopold IV, Duke of Anhalt-Dessau, she would become Duchess consort of Anhalt-Dessau.

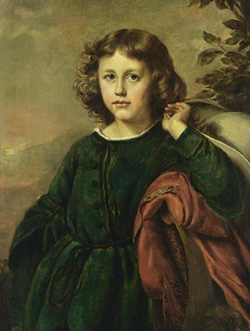
Princess Frederica Wilhelmina of Prussia c. 1810

== Family ==
Frederica was the youngest child and only daughter of Prince Louis Charles of Prussia and his wife Frederica of Mecklenburg-Strelitz. Her father was a younger son of Frederick William II of Prussia. Due to her mother's later marriages, Frederica would have many half-siblings, including George V of Hanover.

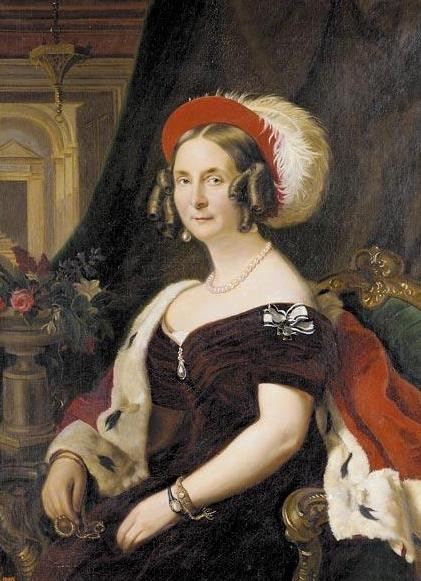
Frederica Wilhelmina of Prussia by Franz Krüger

== Marriage and children ==
On 18 April 1818, Frederica married Leopold IV, Duke of Anhalt-Dessau in Berlin. They had been engaged since 17 May 1816, as the connection had already been arranged by the Prussian court. This dynastic connection was an expression of Leopold's pro-Prussian policies.

They had six children:

Name	Birth	Death	Notes
Princess Fredericka Amalie Auguste	28 November 1819	11 December 1822	
Princess Fredericka Amalie Agnes	24 June 1824	23 October 1897	Married on 28 April 1853 to Ernst I, Duke of Saxe-Altenburg.
A son	3 August 1825	3 August 1825	He was either stillborn or died shortly after the birth.
A son	3 November 1827	3 November 1827	He was either stillborn or died shortly after the birth.
Frederick I, Duke of Anhalt	29 April 1831	24 January 1904	Married on 22 April 1854 to Princess Antoinette of Saxe-Altenburg.
Princess Maria Anna	14 September 1837	12 May 1906	Married on 29 November 1854 to Prince Frederick Charles of Prussia.

Frederica died on 1 January 1850 in Dessau. Leopold would die 21 years later, on 22 May 1871.

== Honours ==
- Dame of the Order of Louise. (Kingdom of Prussia)

== Ancestry ==
Ancestors of Princess Frederica of Prussia, Duchess of Anhalt-Dessau

8. Prince Augustus William of Prussia
4. Frederick William II of Prussia
9. Duchess Luise of Brunswick-Wolfenbüttel
2. Prince Louis Charles of Prussia
10. Louis IX, Landgrave of Hesse-Darmstadt
5. Princess Frederica Louisa of Hesse-Darmstadt
11. Countess Palatine Caroline of Zweibrücken
1. Princess Frederica Wilhelmina of Prussia
12. Duke Charles Louis Frederick of Mecklenburg-Strelitz
6. Charles II, Grand Duke of Mecklenburg-Strelitz
13. Princess Elisabeth Albertine of Saxe-Hildburghausen
3. Duchess Frederica of Mecklenburg-Strelitz
14. Prince George William of Hesse-Darmstadt
7. Princess Friederike of Hesse-Darmstadt
15. Countess Maria Louise Albertine of Leiningen-Dagsburg-Falkenburg

== Sources ==
- Martin, Frederick (1866). The Statesman's Year Book, 1866. London: Macmillan and Co.

Princess Frederica of Prussia, Duchess of Anhalt-Dessau House of Hohenzollern Born: 30 September 1796 Died: 1 January 1850
Regnal titles
Preceded by Louise of Brandenburg-Schwedt as Duchess consort of Anhalt-Dessau	Duchess consort of Anhalt; 18 April 1818 – 1 January 1850	Succeeded by Princess Antoinette of Saxe-Altenburg
