= Prince Eduard of Saxe-Altenburg =

Saxe-Altenburger Royal

Prince Eduard
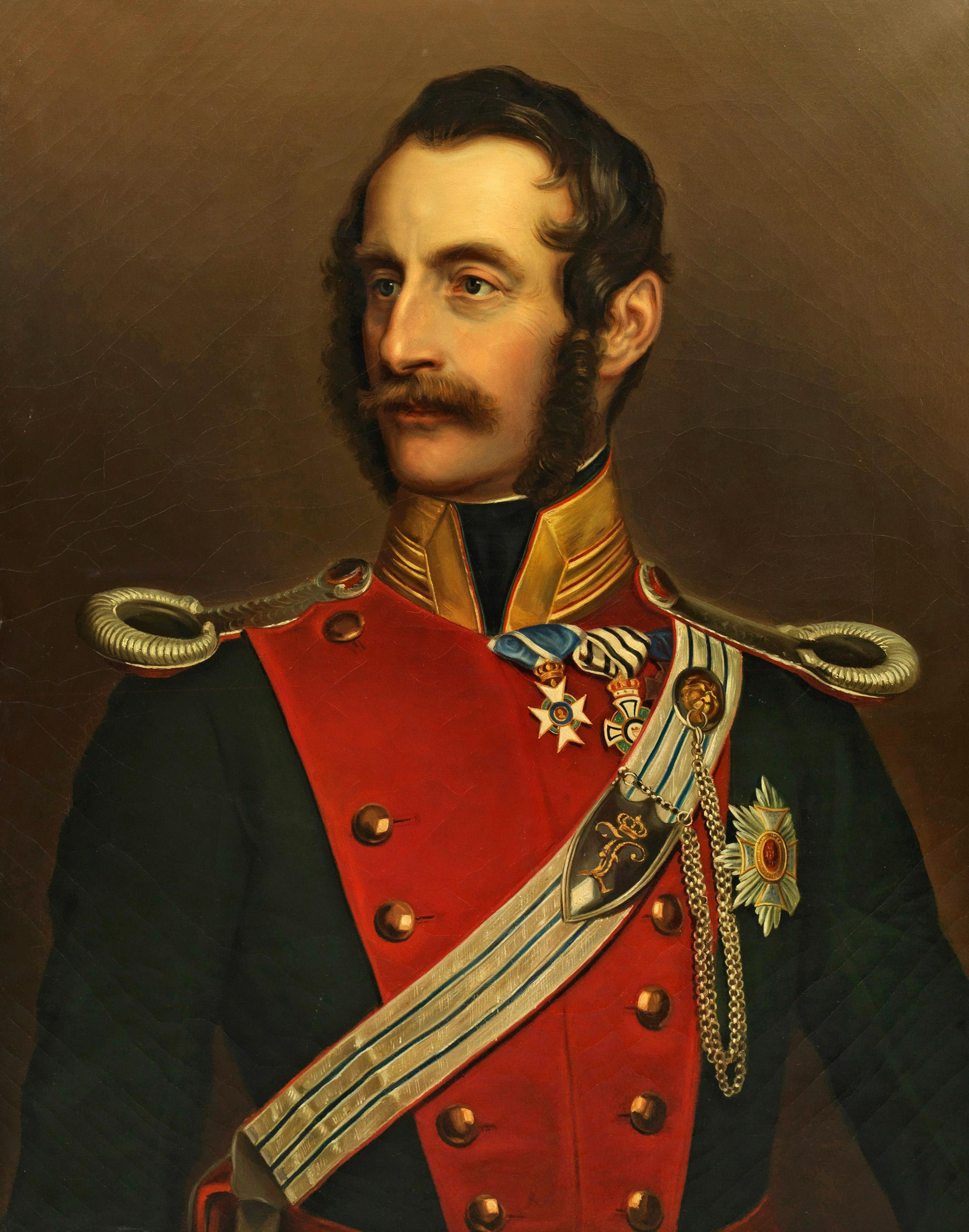
- Portrait c. 1848–1852
- Born: 3 July 1804; Hildburghausen
- Died: 16 May 1852 (aged 47); Munich
- Spouse: Princess Amalie of Hohenzollern-Sigmaringen (m. 1835; died 1841) Princess Luise Caroline Reuss of Greiz (m. 1842)
- Issue: Princess Therese, Duchess of Dalarna; Antoinette, Duchess of Anhalt; Prince Ludwig Joseph; Prince Johann Friedrich; Prince Albert; Marie Gasparine, Princess of Schwarzburg-Sondershausen
Names
- Eduard Karl Wilhelm Christian von Sachsen-Altenburg
- House: House of Wettin
- Father: Frederick, Duke of Saxe-Altenburg
- Mother: Duchess Charlotte Georgine of Mecklenburg-Strelitz

Prince Eduard of Saxe-Altenburg (3 July 1804 in Hildburghausen – 16 May 1852 in Munich), was a German prince of the ducal house of Saxe-Hildburghausen (of Saxe-Altenburg from 1826).

== Family ==
He was the seventh but fourth surviving son of Frederick, Duke of Saxe-Hildburghausen (of Saxe-Altenburg from 1826) and Duchess Charlotte Georgine of Mecklenburg-Strelitz.

== Life ==
=== Military career ===
Eduard accompanied his nephew Otto to Greece as head of the Bavarian military contingent. After the London Conference of 1832 had decided that Greece should have a monarchy, it was offered to Otto, who accepted, and he became the first King of the newly independent Greece in 1832, and the Bavarians led by Otto arrived in the same year. Otto made Eduard governor of Nafplio.

Eduard's stay in Greece was brief. He had returned to Bavaria by 1834, where he served as a senior officer. He served as a commander of the Bavarian forces in the First Schleswig War on the side of the German Confederation. He remained in military service until a year before his death in 1852.

=== Marriages and issue ===
He married firstly in Sigmaringen on 25 July 1835 to Princess Amalie of Hohenzollern-Sigmaringen. They had four children:

1. Therese Amalie Karoline Josephine Antoinette (b. Ansbach, 21 December 1836 - d. Stockholm, 9 November 1914), married on 16 April 1864 to Prince August of Sweden.
2. Antoinette Charlotte Marie Josephine Karoline Frida (b. Bamberg, 17 April 1838 - d. Berchtesgaden, 13 October 1908), married on 22 April 1854 to Frederick I, Duke of Anhalt.
3. Ludwig Joseph Karl Georg Friedrich (b. Bamberg, 24 September 1839 - d. Munich, 13 February 1844) died in childhood.
4. Johann Friedrich Joseph Karl (b. Sigmaringen, 8 January 1841 - d. Munich, 25 February 1844) died in childhood.

He married secondly in Greiz on 8 March 1842 to Princess Luise Caroline Reuss of Greiz, daughter of Heinrich XIX. They had two children:

1. Albert Heinrich Joseph Carl Viktor Georg Friedrich (b. Munich, 14 April 1843 - d. Serrahn, 22 May 1902). He married first Princess Marie of Prussia and secondly Duchess Helene of Mecklenburg-Strelitz.
2. Marie Gasparine Amalie Antoinette Karoline Elisabeth Luise (b. Munich, 28 June 1845 - d. Sondershausen, 5 July 1930), married on 12 June 1869 to Charles Gonthier, Prince of Schwarzburg-Sondershausen.
