= Prince Alexander of Prussia =

Prince of Prussia (1820–1896)

Prince Alexander
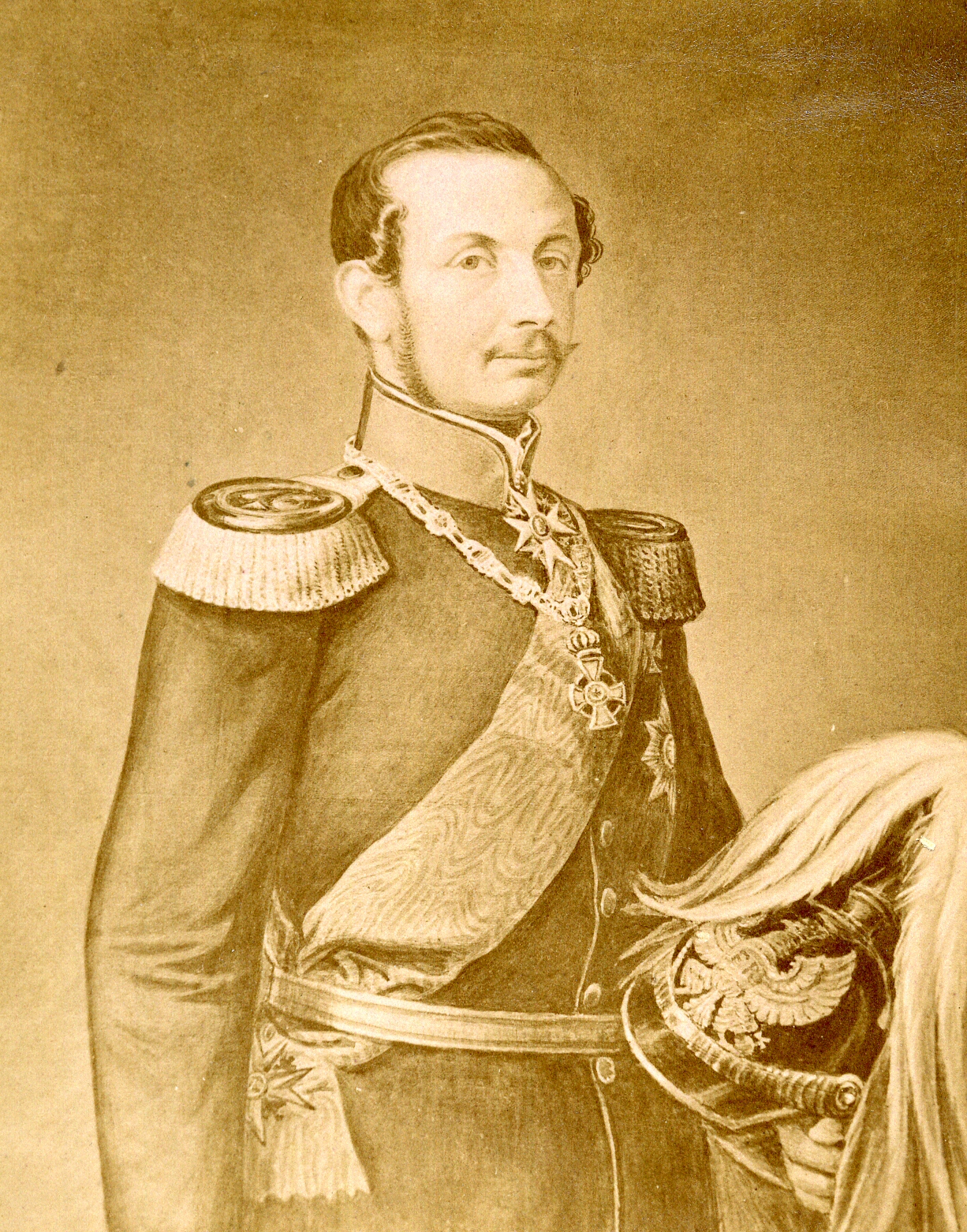
- Prince Alexander, c. 1880
- Born: 21 June 1820; Berlin, Kingdom of Prussia
- Died: 4 January 1896 (aged 75); Berlin, Kingdom of Prussia
Names
- Friedrich Wilhelm Ludwig Alexander
- House: Hohenzollern
- Father: Prince Frederick of Prussia
- Mother: Princess Luise of Anhalt-Bernburg

Prince Friedrich Wilhelm Ludwig Alexander of Prussia (21 June 1820 – 4 January 1896) was the eldest child of Prince Frederick of Prussia and his wife, Princess Luise of Anhalt-Bernburg.

== Early biography ==
=== Military career ===
Alexander joined the army at a young age, and was attached to the headquarters of Crown Prince Frederick William during the Austro-Prussian War. During the morning of the decisive battle of Königgrätz, a humorous account recounted that while on his horse, it ran away; Alexander was found later in the afternoon seated on the horse in a neighboring wood, stating that his horse had insisted on going there.

He served as a general of infantry in the Prussian army. He was also a chief of the Third West Infantry Regiment and chief of the Second Regiment of Grenadiers of the Guard in the Landwehr.

== Later years ==
In 1891, Alexander ended his cure at Marienbad and embarked for Ostend for three to four weeks.

A contemporary figure once recounted that:

The charitable disposition of Prince Alexander of Prussia, the Emperor's cousin... is so well-known and often so appealed to in Berlin, that his secretary must have acquired great experience in answering begging questions. He passes the greater part of the year in Switzerland and at Burg Rheinstein, his castle on the Rhine.

Traveling in Switzerland, Alexander liked to stay under the title Count de Tecklenburg. He was described as an "extraordinary pedestrian", because he "accomplished in twelve hours what the best walker in the valley takes sixteen hours to perform". In November 1852, Alexander went to visit his very ill friend the Duchess of Orleans at her estate at Lausanne, Switzerland, though she survived for six more years.

=== Death and legacy ===
In late December 1895, Alexander was reported to be "critically ill". He died at a quarter to eleven on 4 January 1896 after ailing for some time. The Emperor and Empress were at his bedside when he died. On 9 January, Alexander's funeral was held in a Berlin cathedral. Members of the Imperial court attended, including the Emperor and Empress, Dowager Empress Frederick, as well as members of the diplomatic corps and the Bundesrat, and a number of generals from the Germany army. His death sent the Berlin court into mourning for a month, causing the planned season's functions and court festivities to be altered. Hunting excursions prearranged for the month were also canceled. Some of the members of his entourage received quite substantial legacies, but the rest of his estate passed to his younger brother Prince George of Prussia, and after his death, to Alexander's godchild Prince Oskar of Prussia.

Much was written about Alexander's supposedly promiscuous ways. In her 1915 work Memories of forty years, Catherine Radziwill recalled that:

"[Prince Alexander], though none too intelligent, was extremely fond of society, feminine society in particular. I remember that one day, at my mother-in-law's house, he managed to decoy into an empty room a certain Madame von Wildenbruch, the wife of an illegitimate son of Prince Louis Ferdinand of Prussia, and began kissing her with fervour, to the extreme stupefaction and anger of the lady in question, who, it must be added, was at that time nearly seventy years of age".

Despite never marrying, another source said Alexander declared marriage to every woman he met, "no matter if she be princess or laundress, octogenarian or young girl, married or single".

== Honours ==
He received the following orders and decorations:

- Kingdom of Prussia:
  - Knight of the Black Eagle, 21 June 1830; with Collar, 1856
  - Grand Commander's Cross of the Royal House Order of Hohenzollern, 23 August 1851
  - Grand Cross of the Red Eagle, with Oak Leaves, 18 October 1861; with Swords, 1866; with Crown, 12 June 1892
  - Knight of the Crown Order, 1st Class, 18 October 1861
  - Service Award Cross
- Ascanian duchies: Grand Cross of the Order of Albert the Bear, 27 June 1865'
- Baden:
  - Knight of the House Order of Fidelity, 1856
  - Grand Cross of the Zähringer Lion, 1856
- Kingdom of Bavaria: Knight of St. Hubert, 1860
- Belgium: Grand Cordon of the Order of Leopold (military), 25 April 1867
- (Saxe-Coburg and Gotha) (Duchy of Saxe-Altenburg) (Saxe-Meiningen) Ernestine duchies: Grand Cross of the Saxe-Ernestine House Order, 1859
- Kingdom of Hanover: Grand Cross of the Royal Guelphic Order, 1847
- Grand Duchy of Hesse: Grand Cross of the Ludwig Order, 24 May 1888
- Hohenzollern: Cross of Honour of the Princely House Order of Hohenzollern, 1st Class with Swords
- Mecklenburg: Grand Cross of the Wendish Crown, with Crown in Ore
- Oldenburg: Grand Cross of the Order of Duke Peter Friedrich Ludwig, with Golden Crown, 18 February 1878; with Collar
- Russian Empire:
  - Knight of St. Andrew
  - Knight of St. Alexander Nevsky
  - Knight of the White Eagle
  - Knight of St. Anna, 1st Class
  - Knight of St. Stanislaus, 1st Class

== Ancestry ==
Ancestors of Prince Alexander of Prussia

8. Frederick William II of Prussia
4. Prince Louis Charles of Prussia
9. Landgravine Frederika Louisa of Hesse-Darmstadt
2. Prince Frederick of Prussia
10. Charles II, Grand Duke of Mecklenburg-Strelitz
5. Duchess Frederica of Mecklenburg-Strelitz
11. Princess Friederike of Hesse-Darmstadt
1. Prince Alexander of Prussia
12. Frederick Albert, Prince of Anhalt-Bernburg
6. Alexius Frederick Christian, Duke of Anhalt-Bernburg
13. Duchess Louise Albertine of Schleswig-Holstein-Sonderburg-Plön
3. Princess Wilhelmine of Anhalt-Bernburg
14. William I, Elector of Hesse
7. Marie Friederike of Hesse-Kassel
15. Princess Wilhelmina Caroline of Denmark and Norway
