= Order of Albert the Bear =

House order founded in 1836

House Order of Albert the Bear Hausorden Albrechts des Bären
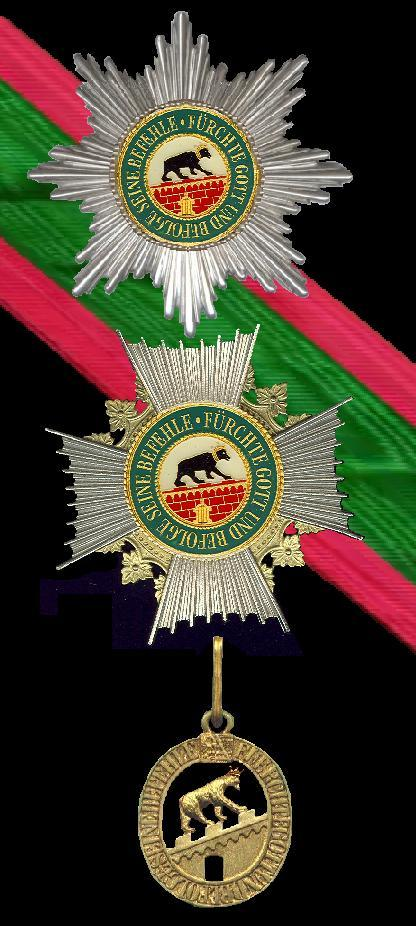
- Type: House Order
- Presented by: Anhalt
- Established: 18 November 1836

Highlights
- Total recipients: Estimated; Grand Cross 15; Commander Cross 1st Class 10; Commander Cross 2nd Class 20; Knight Cross 1st Class 60; Knight Cross 2nd Class 60
- Website: http://www.albrechtderbaer.de
- Ribbon of the order

Precedence
- Next (lower): Order of Merit for Science and Art

The House Order of Albert the Bear (German: Hausorden Albrechts des Bären or Der Herzoglich Anhaltische Hausorden Albrechts des Bären) was founded in 1836 as a joint House Order by three dukes of Anhalt from separate branches of the family: Henry, Duke of Anhalt-Köthen, Leopold IV, Duke of Anhalt-Dessau, and Alexander Karl, Duke of Anhalt-Bernburg.

The namesake of the order, Albert the Bear, was the first Margrave of Brandenburg from the House of Ascania. The origin of his nickname "the Bear" is unknown.

This order originally had four ranks, i.e. Grand Cross, Commander 1st Class, Commander 2nd Class and Knight (1st Class). In 1854, the rank Knight 2nd Class was added. In 1864, Leopold IV, who by virtue of the extinction of the other branches of the family had become the sole Duke of Anhalt, altered the statute to provide that the order could be granted with swords.

On 29 April 1901, in honor of the 70th birthday of Duke Frederick I, a crown was added to all classes of the order. The breast stars of the order remained unchanged.

The order is still in existence as a House Order, with Eduard, Prince of Anhalt serving as the current Grand Master. The house order has currently three ranks, i.e. Grand Cross, Commander (men) or Dame-Commander (women), and Knight (men) or Dame (women), and as well the Medal of Merit associated with this Order. Recent recipients include Infante Carlos, Duke of Calabria and Princess Khétévane Bagration de Moukhrani.

== Recipients ==
- Prince Adalbert of Prussia (1811–1873)
- Adolphe, Grand Duke of Luxembourg
- Adolphus Frederick VI, Grand Duke of Mecklenburg-Strelitz
- Adolphus Frederick V, Grand Duke of Mecklenburg-Strelitz
- Albert I of Belgium
- Albert, 8th Prince of Thurn and Taxis
- Prince Albert of Prussia (1809–1872)
- Prince Albert of Saxe-Altenburg
- Albert of Saxony
- Albert, Duke of Schleswig-Holstein
- Prince Albert of Prussia (1837–1906)
- Alexander Frederick, Landgrave of Hesse
- Alexander of Battenberg
- Prince Alexander of Prussia
- Alfred, 2nd Prince of Montenuovo
- Prince Aribert of Anhalt
- Werner Anton
- Prince Arthur, Duke of Connaught and Strathearn
- Prince August, Duke of Dalarna
- Prince August of Württemberg
- Otto von Bismarck
- Walther Bronsart von Schellendorff
- Bernhard von Bülow
- Carl, Duke of Württemberg
- Charles XV
- Charles Alexander, Grand Duke of Saxe-Weimar-Eisenach
- Charles Augustus, Hereditary Grand Duke of Saxe-Weimar-Eisenach (1844–1894)
- Charles Gonthier, Prince of Schwarzburg-Sondershausen
- Chlodwig, Prince of Hohenlohe-Schillingsfürst
- Christian IX of Denmark
- Prince Christian of Schleswig-Holstein
- Prince Christian Victor of Schleswig-Holstein
- Gerhard Conrad (pilot)
- Constantine I of Greece
- Eduard, Duke of Anhalt
- Eduard, Prince of Anhalt
- Ernest Augustus, King of Hanover
- Ernest Louis, Grand Duke of Hesse
- Ernst I, Duke of Saxe-Altenburg
- Ernst Gunther, Duke of Schleswig-Holstein
- Ernst II, Duke of Saxe-Altenburg
- Ferdinand I of Austria
- Hermann von François
- Archduke Franz Ferdinand of Austria
- Franz Joseph I of Austria
- Frederick II, Grand Duke of Baden
- Frederick VII of Denmark
- Frederick VIII of Denmark
- Frederick Augustus II, Grand Duke of Oldenburg
- Prince Frederick Charles of Hesse
- Frederick Francis II, Grand Duke of Mecklenburg-Schwerin
- Frederick I, Duke of Anhalt
- Frederick I, Grand Duke of Baden
- Frederick III, German Emperor
- Prince Frederick of Hohenzollern-Sigmaringen
- Frederick, Prince of Hohenzollern
- Prince Frederick of Prussia (1794–1863)
- Frederick William IV of Prussia
- Frederick William, Grand Duke of Mecklenburg-Strelitz
- Friedrich II, Duke of Anhalt
- Friedrich Ferdinand, Duke of Schleswig-Holstein
- Prince Friedrich Karl of Prussia (1828–1885)
- Prince Friedrich Leopold of Prussia
- Prince Frederick of Schaumburg-Lippe
- Friedrich, Duke of Schleswig-Holstein-Sonderburg-Glücksburg
- Georg II, Duke of Saxe-Meiningen
- George I of Greece
- George V of Hanover
- George Albert, Prince of Schwarzburg-Rudolstadt
- Prince George of Prussia
- George Victor, Prince of Waldeck and Pyrmont
- Erich von Gündell
- Leopold Freiherr von Hauer
- Prince Henry of Prussia (1862–1929)
- Paul von Hindenburg
- Eberhard von Hofacker
- Prince Joachim of Prussia
- Prince Johann of Schleswig-Holstein-Sonderburg-Glücksburg
- John of Saxony
- Joseph, Duke of Saxe-Altenburg
- Ferdinand Jühlke
- Prince Julius of Schleswig-Holstein-Sonderburg-Glücksburg
- Prince Karl Anton of Hohenzollern
- Karl Anton, Prince of Hohenzollern
- Karl, Duke of Schleswig-Holstein-Sonderburg-Glücksburg
- Julius Kühn
- Auguste, Baron Lambermont
- Léo d'Ursel
- Leopold II of Belgium
- Leopold IV, Duke of Anhalt
- Leopold, Hereditary Prince of Anhalt
- Prince Leopold of Bavaria
- Alexander von Linsingen
- Ewald von Lochow
- Louis IV, Grand Duke of Hesse
- Ludwig I of Bavaria
- Maria Emanuel, Margrave of Meissen
- Prince Maximilian of Baden
- Klemens von Metternich
- Milan I of Serbia
- Helmuth von Moltke the Elder
- Prince Moritz of Saxe-Altenburg
- Nicholas I of Russia
- Jean-Baptiste Nothomb
- Oscar II
- Peter II, Grand Duke of Oldenburg
- Prince Philippe, Count of Flanders
- Prince Frederick William of Hesse-Kassel
- Prince Friedrich Wilhelm of Prussia
- Rupprecht, Crown Prince of Bavaria
- Prince William of Schaumburg-Lippe
- Reinhard Scheer
- Princess Friederike of Schleswig-Holstein-Sonderburg-Glücksburg
- Archduke Stephen of Austria (Palatine of Hungary)
- Otto Graf zu Stolberg-Wernigerode
- Hermann von Strantz
- Otto von Stülpnagel
- Tewodros II Emperor of Ethiopia
- Prince Valdemar of Denmark
- Wilhelm II, German Emperor
- William I, German Emperor
- William II of Württemberg
- William Ernest, Grand Duke of Saxe-Weimar-Eisenach
- William IV, Grand Duke of Luxembourg
- Prince William of Baden (1829–1897)
- William, Prince of Hohenzollern
