= Princess Friederike of Schleswig-Holstein-Sonderburg-Glücksburg =

Princess Friederike
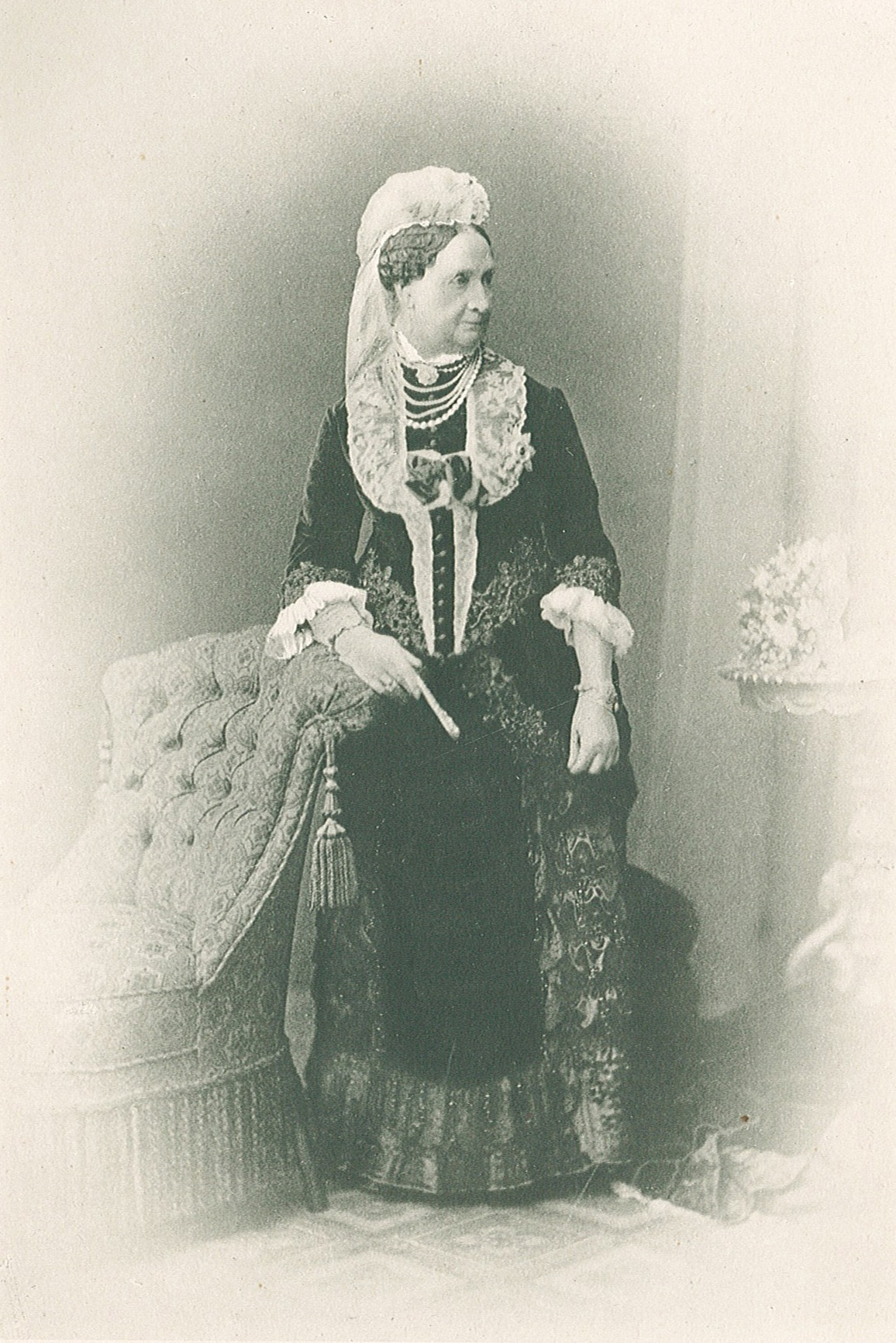
- Photograph of Duchess Friederike

Duchess consort of Anhalt-Bernburg
- Tenure: 30 October 1834 - 19 August 1863

Regent of Anhalt-Bernburg
- Tenure: November 1855 - 19 August 1863
- Born: 9 October 1811; Gottorp, Schleswig, Duchy of Schleswig
- Died: 10 July 1902 (aged 90); Ballenstedt, Duchy of Anhalt, German Empire
- Spouse: Alexander Karl, Duke of Anhalt-Bernburg (m. 1834; died 1863)
Names
- Frederica Caroline Juliana; German: Friederike Karoline Juliane
- House: Glücksburg (by birth); Anhalt (by marriage)
- Father: Friedrich Wilhelm, Duke of Schleswig-Holstein-Sonderburg-Glücksburg
- Mother: Princess Louise Caroline of Hesse-Kassel

Princess Friederike of Schleswig-Holstein-Sonderburg-Glücksburg (9 October 1811 – 10 July 1902) was the daughter of Friedrich Wilhelm, Duke of Schleswig-Holstein-Sonderburg-Glücksburg, and Princess Louise Caroline of Hesse-Kassel and an elder sister of Christian IX of Denmark. She became the Duchess of Anhalt-Bernburg upon her marriage to Alexander Karl, Duke of Anhalt-Bernburg, the last Duke of Anhalt-Bernburg. She served as Regent of the Duchy from 1855 to 1863.

== Early life ==
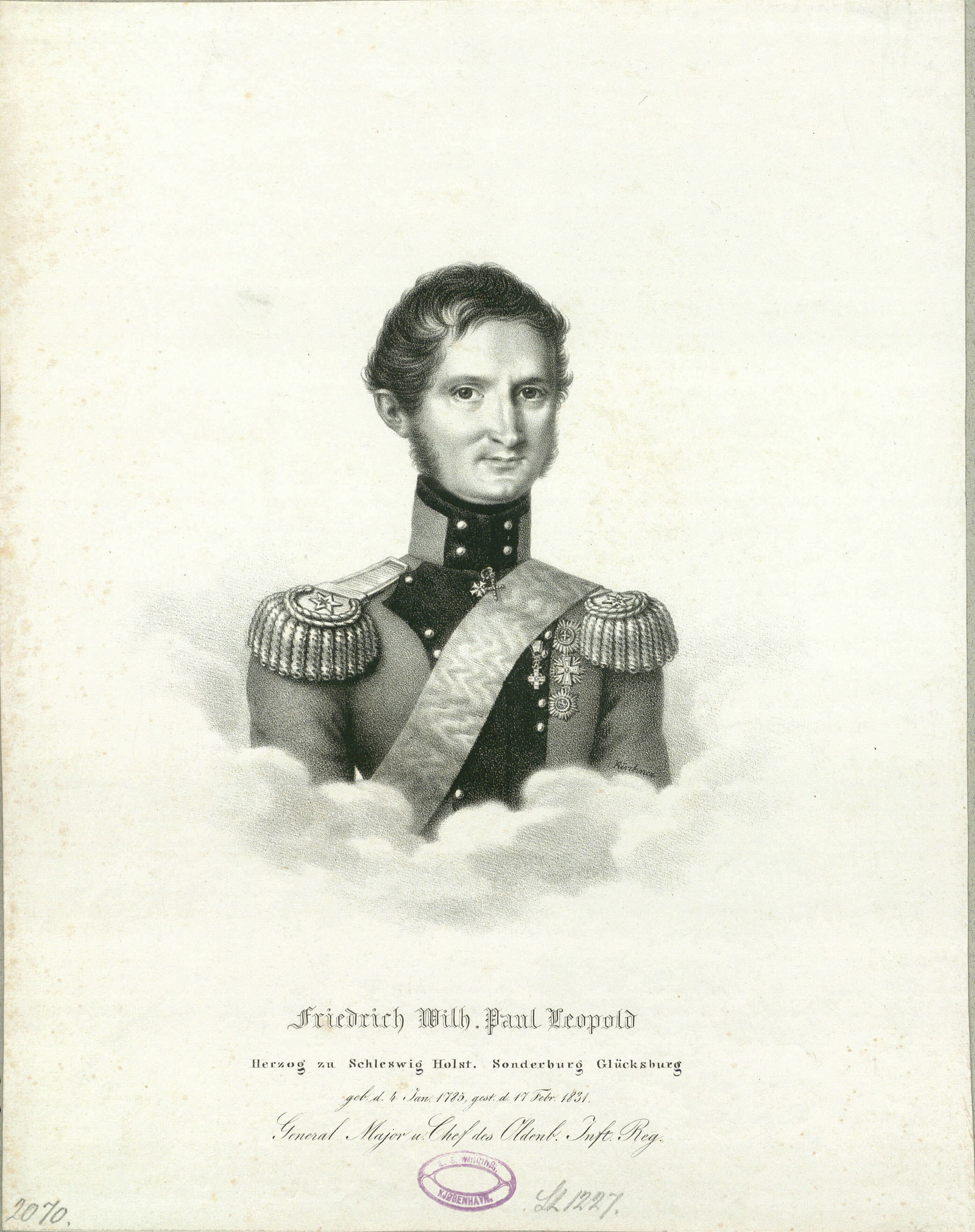
Friederike's father Friedrich Wilhelm, Duke of Schleswig-Holstein-Sonderburg-Beck, from 1825 Duke of Glücksburg.

Friederike was born on 9 October 1811 at Gottorp Castle near Schleswig in the Duchy of Schleswig as Princess Friederike of Schleswig-Holstein-Sonderburg-Beck, the second-eldest daughter of Friedrich Wilhelm, Duke of Schleswig-Holstein-Sonderburg-Beck, and Princess Louise Caroline of Hesse-Kassel.

Friederike's father was the head of the ducal house of Schleswig-Holstein-Sonderburg-Beck, a junior male branch of the House of Oldenburg which had occupied the throne of Denmark since 1448. Through her father, Friederike was thus a direct male-line descendant of King Christian III of Denmark.

Friederike's mother was a daughter of Landgrave Charles of Hesse, a Danish Field Marshal and Royal Governor of the duchies of Schleswig and Holstein, and his wife Princess Louise of Denmark, a daughter of Frederick V of Denmark.

On 6 June 1825, Duke Friedrich Wilhelm was appointed Duke of Glücksburg by his brother-in-law Frederick VI of Denmark, as the elder Glücksburg line had become extinct in 1779. He subsequently changed his title to Duke of Schleswig-Holstein-Sonderburg-Glücksburg and founded the younger Glücksburg line.

== Duchess of Anhalt-Bernburg ==
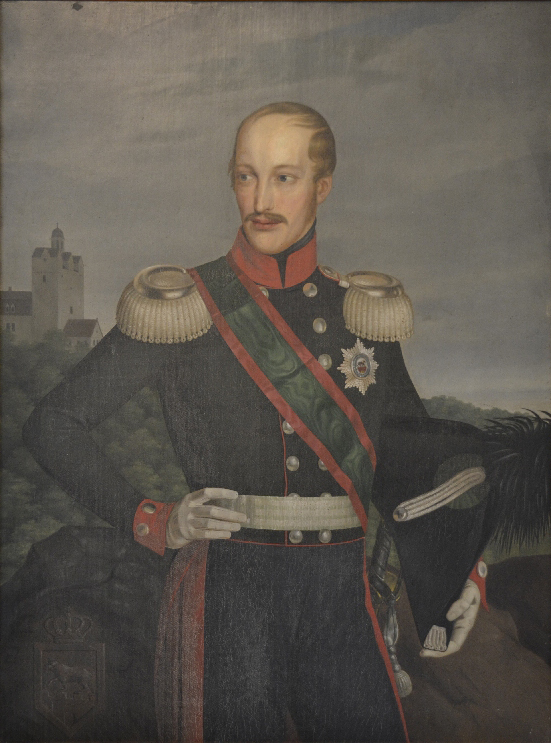
Alexander Charles, Duke of Anhalt-Bernburg

Friederike married Alexander Karl, Duke of Anhalt-Bernburg, the fourth child and only surviving son of Alexis Friedrich Christian, Duke of Anhalt-Bernburg by his first wife, Princess Marie Friederike of Hesse-Kassel, on 30 October 1834 at Schloss Louisenlund, near Schleswig. Their marriage remained childless.

By November 1855 the Duke was confined to Schloss Hoym due to a progressive mental illness (some sources state that he suffered from schizophrenia). There, Alexander Karl spend the rest of his life under medical care in the company of his chamberlain, the painter Wilhelm von Kügelgen.

Due to the incapacity of her husband, Friederike acted as regent of the Duchy of Anhalt-Bernburg.

== Later life ==
Alexander Karl died at Hoym on 19 August 1863 at age 58. Because the marriage produced no issue, the Duchy of Anhalt-Bernburg was inherited by his kinsman Leopold IV, Duke of Anhalt-Dessau-Köthen who merged the duchy with his own to form a united Duchy of Anhalt.

The Dowager Duchess Friederike died on 10 July 1902 at Alexisbad, Ballenstedt.

== Ancestry ==
Ancestors of Princess Friederike of Schleswig-Holstein-Sonderburg-Glücksburg

8. Prince Karl Anton August of Schleswig-Holstein-Sonderburg-Beck
4. Frederick Charles Louis, Duke of Schleswig-Holstein-Sonderburg-Beck
9. Countess Charlotte of Dohna-Leistenau
2. Frederick William, Duke of Schleswig-Holstein-Sonderburg-Glücksburg
10. Count Karl Leopold von Schlieben
5. Countess Friederike von Schlieben
11. Countess Marie Eleonore von Lehndorff
1. Princess Friederike of Schleswig-Holstein-Sonderburg-Glücksburg
12. Frederick II, Landgrave of Hesse-Kassel
6. Prince Charles of Hesse-Kassel
13. Princess Mary of Great Britain
3. Princess Louise Caroline of Hesse-Kassel
14. Frederick V of Denmark
7. Princess Louise of Denmark
15. Princess Louisa of Great Britain

Princess Friederike of Schleswig-Holstein-Sonderburg-Glücksburg House of Schleswig-Holstein-Sonderburg-Glücksburg Cadet branch of the House of Oldenburg Born: 9 October 1811 Died: 10 July 1902
Regnal titles
Preceded by Marie Friederike of Hesse-Kassel	Duchess of Anhalt-Bernburg; 30 October 1834–19 August 1863	Succeeded by none
