= Princess Luise of Anhalt-Bernburg =

Luise of Anhalt-Bernburg
- Princess Frederick of Prussia
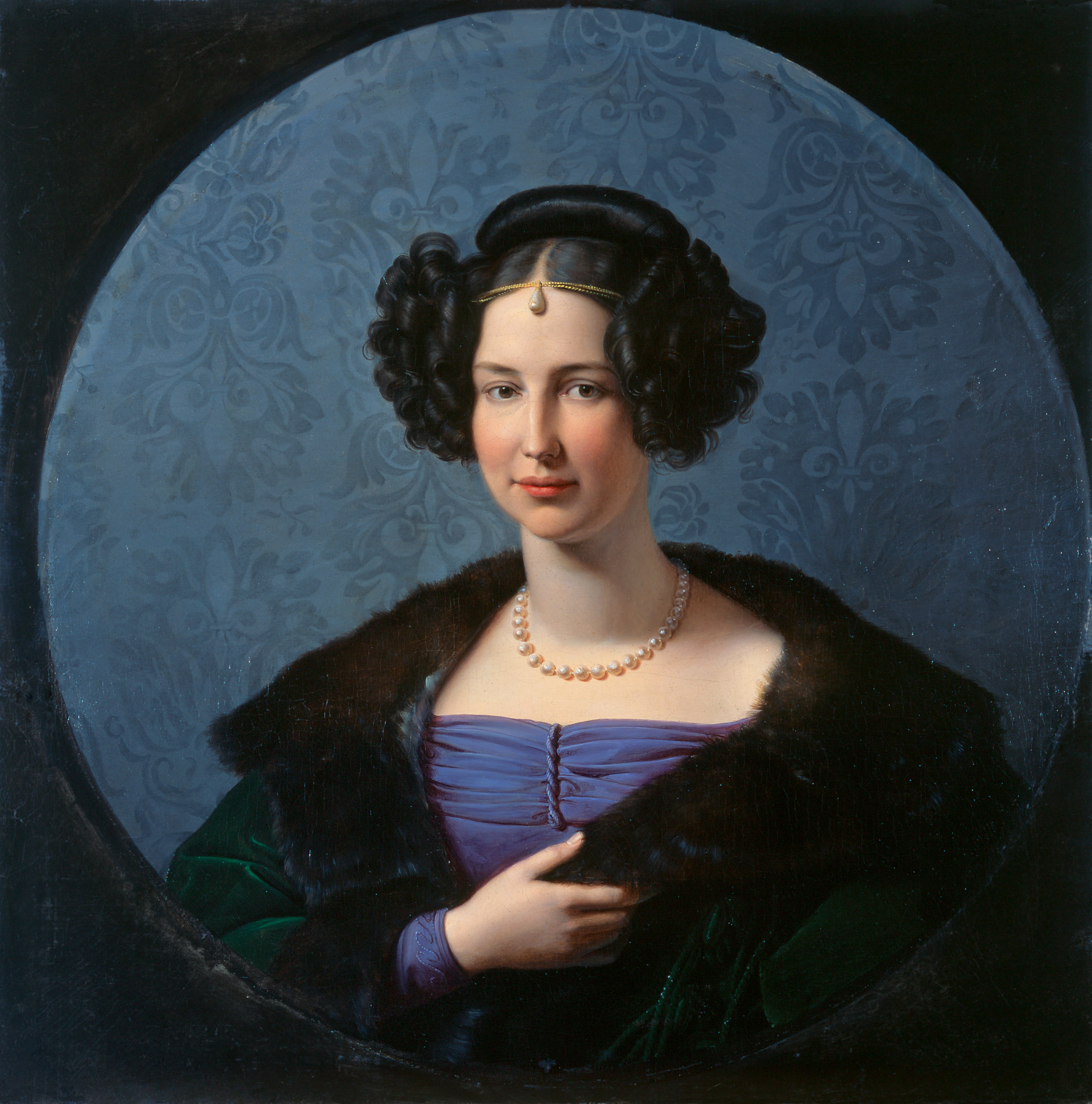
- Portrait 1840
- Born: 30 October 1799; Ballenstedt, Anhalt-Bernburg, Holy Roman Empire
- Died: 9 December 1882 (aged 83); Düsseldorf, German Empire
- Spouse: Prince Frederick of Prussia (m. 1817; died 1863)
- Issue: Prince Alexander; Prince George
Names
- German: Wilhelmine Luise
- House: Ascania
- Father: Alexius Frederick Christian, Duke of Anhalt-Bernburg
- Mother: Marie Friederike of Hesse-Kassel

Princess Luise of Anhalt-Bernburg (30 October 1799 – 9 December 1882), also known as Princess Friedrich of Prussia (after her husband, Prince Friedrich of Prussia), was a German princess.

== Early life ==
Luise was born on 30 October 1799 to Alexius Frederick Christian, Duke of Anhalt-Bernburg and his wife, Marie Friederike of Hesse-Kassel. She was a princess of Anhalt-Bernburg and member of the House of Ascania.

== Personal life ==
She married Prince Frederick of Prussia on 21 November 1817. They had two children:

- Prince Alexander of Prussia (21 June 1820, Berlin – 4 January 1896, Berlin)
- Prince George of Prussia (12 February 1826, Düsseldorf – 2 May 1902, Berlin).

== Death ==
Princess Luise died on 9 December 1882 in Düsseldorf at age 83. Her remains were interred in the Burgkapelle of Burg Rheinstein in Germany.
