= Prince George of Prussia =

Member of the House of Hohenzollern

Prince George
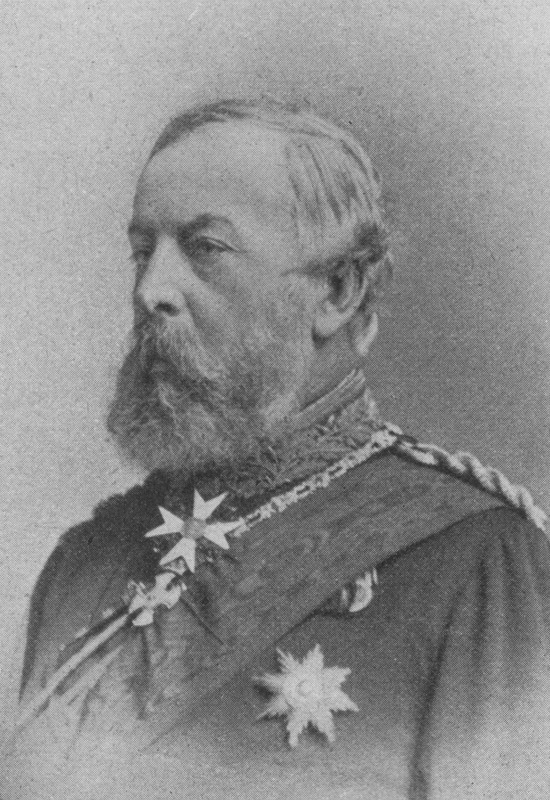
- Prince Georg, c. 1900
- Born: 12 February 1826; Düsseldorf
- Died: 2 May 1902 (aged 76); Berlin
- Burial: Burg Rheinstein
Names
- German: Prinz Friedrich Wilhelm Georg Ernst von Preußen
- House: Hohenzollern
- Father: Prince Frederick of Prussia
- Mother: Princess Luise of Anhalt-Bernburg

Prince George of Prussia (Frederick William George Ernest; 12 February 1826 – 2 May 1902) was a member of the House of Hohenzollern.

A man of many talents, George was at various periods of his life a Prussian general, poet and writer, often going, according to Moeller, under the sobriquet George Conrad. He wrote and published over 25 plays in his lifetime.

== Family and early life ==
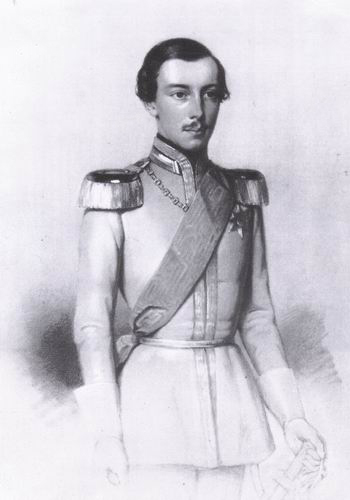
Portrait of Prince George by an unknown artist, c. 1850

Prince George was born in Düsseldorf, the youngest son of Prince Frederick of Prussia, who was a grandson of Frederick William II of Prussia. His mother was Princess Wilhelmine Luise of Anhalt-Bernburg, only surviving daughter of Alexius Frederick Christian, Duke of Anhalt-Bernburg.

His youth was spent on the Rhine near the castle Jägerhof, where his father was stationed. He often traveled to Britain, France and Italy, discovering art and literature. Notwithstanding the Hohenzollern family tradition, Prince George showed no inclination in a military career; furthermore, though his early musical talents began to unfold very nicely, he became a military officer in 1836; in 1861, he was the head of the first Pomeranian Lancers No. 4, and by 1866, he was general of the cavalry. During the Austro-Prussian War in 1866, George took his regiment into battles against Austria, and also fought in the Franco-Prussian War from 1870 to 1871.

== Later life ==
=== Literary interests ===
In the 1850s, he came to Berlin, where the prince encountered the salon of Minna von Tresckow. It was she who encouraged him to publish his plays. In 1872 he anonymously published his autobiography "Yellowed leaves", but further insight into his privacy was not forthcoming. When the General Association of German literature was formed, he took over in 1873 the founding protectorate from 1874, and was also protector of the Historical Museum of the City of Düsseldorf. In the same year he became president of the non-profit Academy Sciences. Upon his death, he would bequeath his extensive library of approximately 6,000 titles to the University Library of Bonn.

Prince George was of a modest, retiring nature, and cared little for the show royal society typically demanded. Consequently, he participated but rarely in court festivities and state functions; George also carefully held himself aloof from politics, and saw little of his relatives, save at purely private and family dinners. He chose instead to devote himself to art and literature. George often took pleasure in visiting second-hand book shops and rummaging among their contents for literary treasures. As a result, he collected a great number of books that filled up his palace at Wilhelmstrasse in Berlin.

The prince wrote many of his plays in what was said to be excellent French, often under pseudonyms; as a result, many of his plays' audiences were unaware that a Prussian prince was behind them. Prior to the Franco-Prussian War, Prince George was very close to many French writers, poets, and other literary figures such as Alexandre Dumas; many of them gathered annually at Ems with the prince to discuss artistic topics. After the war however, Prussian and French emotions were heightened, and George found it difficult to reconcile his private pleasures with the opinions of his family. He stopped traveling to Paris, and indeed did not set foot on French soil for many years. Despite the distance, Prince George made an effort to closely follow the literary scene in Paris thereafter, and acquaintances were often shocked at how well he knew what was occurring artistically in France.

A contemporary of George's later remarked that though he liked to dabble in poetry, "his efforts were better appreciated in the circle of the court, where some of his pieces have been represented, than by the outer world".

=== Empress Eugénie ===
In the mid-1870s, reports emerged in the press concerning Prince George and Empress Eugénie, the widowed wife of the deposed Napoleon III of France, whose fate had been the result of the German invasion. Before the war, the prince had been a frequent and welcome visitor to Napoleon's court; thus when Eugénie took up residence at the same hotel he was residing in Carlsbad, Prince George was faced with little choice but to visit her. On the one hand, he was obligated to pay his attentions or else be exposed for gross discourtesy; on the other hand, he felt that any public knowledge of her meeting with a German prince might prove unpleasant to her, as she was eager to recover the French throne for her son Louis Napoléon. To solve this dilemma, Prince George sent her flowers, and made it known to her secretary that if she so wished, he would attend an audience with her to "lay his homage at the feet of her majesty". Soon after however, the empress left Carlsbad and made it known to the press that her departure was due to the undesirable attentions of Prince George. Newspapers made the most of the story, abusing the prince by declaring that he was mentally unbalanced. One defended these claims:

"Nothing can be further from the truth. It cannot be denied that he has a few harmless and kindly eccentricities which would attract no attention whatever in an ordinary septuagenarian, but which excite comment merely by reason of his rank as a prince of the blood. He is [a] gentle, brilliantly accomplished, chivalrous old fellow, without an enemy in the world, and is a great favorite with the emperor's children, who will deeply miss him when he passes over to the majority, and is laid to rest in the family vault of the house of Hohenzollern".

Prince George remained very fond of distant kinsman Emperor Wilhelm II. In his youth, George was the closest with Empress Augusta, wife of Wilhelm's grandfather Wilhelm I, German Emperor. Rumors had circulated that these affections were romantic, but no proof exists that these were true. Perhaps coincidentally, some thought that George bore a striking resemblance to Wilhelm I, particularly when he was in uniform.

=== Death ===
Prince George died on 2 May 1902, in Berlin. At the time, he was the oldest living member of the House of Hohenzollern. After his death his body was brought to the castle Rheinstein, which he had inherited in 1863 with his only brother Prince Alexander and for which he always cherished a predilection; on 9 May 1902 he was buried in the chapel of the castle. In 1906 the newly established state school as Düsseldorf Royal Prince Georg-Gymnasium was named in his honor.

== List of works ==
Under the pseudonyms George Conrad and Gunther von Freiberg, Prince George wrote and published many poems and plays:

- Elfrida von Monte Salerno (drama) 1874
- Cleopatra (tragedy) 1877
- Phädra (tragedy) 1877
- Elektra (drama) 1877
- Revenue de tout 1877
- Rudél et Mélisande (tragedy) 1877
- Don Sylvio (tragedy) 1877
- Der Alexanderzug (fantastical tragedy) 1877
- Der Talisman (tragedy) 1877
- Alexandros (tragedy) 1877
- Umsonst oder Christine, König von Schweden (tragedy) 1877
- Arion (tragedy) 1877
- Wo liegt das Glück? (comedy) 1877
- Bianca Cappello 1877
- Yolanthe (tragedy) 1877
- Lurley (tragedy) 1877
- Adonia 1877
- Medea (tragedy) 1877
- Suleiman (Nachspiel) 1877
- Ferrara (tragedy) 1878
- Mademoiselle Esther (drama) 1883
- Catharina von Medici (historical drama) 1884
- Sappho (drama) 1887
- Conradin (tragedy) 1887
- Praxedis (drama) 1896
- Raphael Sanzio (drama) 1896

== Honours ==
He received the following orders and decorations:

- Kingdom of Prussia:
  - Knight of the Black Eagle, 12 February 1836; with Collar, 10 april 1847
  - Grand Commander's Cross of the Royal House Order of Hohenzollern, 23 August 1851
  - Grand Cross of the Red Eagle, with Oak Leaves, 18 October 1861; with Crown, 12 June 1892
  - Knight of the Crown Order, 1st Class, 18 October 1861
  - Service Award Cross
- Hohenzollern: Cross of Honour of the Princely House Order of Hohenzollern, 1st Class
- Ascanian duchies: Grand Cross of the Order of Albert the Bear, 28 April 1853'
- Baden:
  - Knight of the House Order of Fidelity, 1856
  - Grand Cross of the Zähringer Lion, 1856
- Kingdom of Bavaria: Knight of St. Hubert, 1862
- (Saxe-Coburg and Gotha) (Duchy of Saxe-Altenburg) (Saxe-Meiningen) Ernestine duchies: Grand Cross of the Saxe-Ernestine House Order, January 1864
- Kingdom of Hanover: Grand Cross of the Royal Guelphic Order, 1846
- Grand Duchy of Hesse: Grand Cross of the Ludwig Order, 21 November 1862
- Mecklenburg: Grand Cross of the Wendish Crown, with Crown in Ore
- Oldenburg: Grand Cross of the Order of Duke Peter Friedrich Ludwig, with Golden Crown, 3 July 1860
- Saxe-Weimar-Eisenach: Grand Cross of the White Falcon, 13 October 1853
- Austrian Empire: Grand Cross of the Royal Hungarian Order of St. Stephen, 1852
- Belgium: Grand Cordon of the Order of Leopold (military), 25 April 1867
- Netherlands: Grand Cross of the Netherlands Lion
- Kingdom of Portugal: Grand Cross of the Tower and Sword
- Russian Empire:
  - Knight of St. Andrew
  - Knight of St. Alexander Nevsky
  - Knight of the White Eagle
  - Knight of St. Anna, 1st Class
  - Knight of St. Stanislaus, 1st Class

== Ancestry ==
Ancestors of Prince George of Prussia

8. Frederick William II of Prussia
4. Prince Louis Charles of Prussia
9. Princess Frederica Louisa of Hesse-Darmstadt
2. Prince Frederick of Prussia
10. Charles II, Grand Duke of Mecklenburg-Strelitz
5. Duchess Frederica of Mecklenburg-Strelitz
11. Princess Friederike of Hesse-Darmstadt
1. Prince George of Prussia
12. Frederick Albert, Prince of Anhalt-Bernburg
6. Alexius Frederick Christian, Duke of Anhalt-Bernburg
13. Princess Louise Albertine of Schleswig-Holstein-Sonderburg-Plön
3. Princess Wilhelmine of Anhalt-Bernburg
14. William I, Elector of Hesse
7. Princess Marie Friederike of Hesse-Kassel
15. Princess Wilhelmina Caroline of Denmark
