= Leopold Freiherr von Hauer =

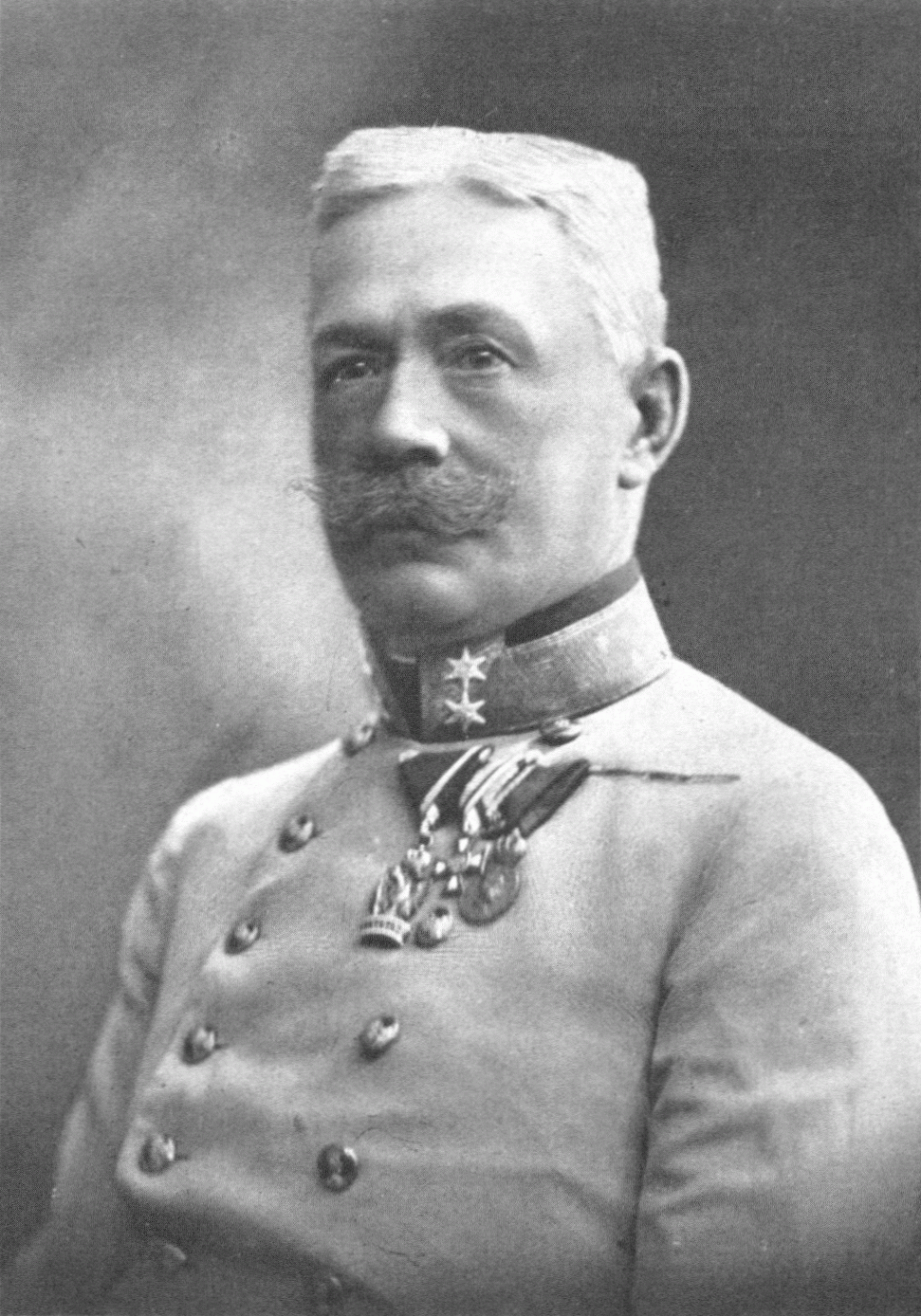
Leopold Freiherr von Hauer

Leopold Freiherr von Hauer (born 26 January 1854 in Budapest, Hungary, died on 3 May 1933, in Budapest) was a Colonel General in the Austro-Hungarian Army. He participated in the First World War on the Russian front.

At the outbreak of the War, he commanded the 9th Cavalry Division, and from October 1914 until October 1917 the Cavalry Corps Hauer.

== Decorations and awards ==
- Order of the Crown, 3rd class (Prussia, 1889)
- Military Merit Medal in Bronze (Austria-Hungary, 21 May 1895) - on the recommendation of the Emperor
- Military Merit Cross (Austria-Hungary, 2 December 1898) - because of his merits in cavalry training
- Commander's Cross of the Order of Vasa (Sweden, c. 1898)
- Grand Cross of the House and Merit Order of Peter Frederick Louis (Grand Duchy of Oldenburg, 1898)
- Order of the Lion and the Sun, 2nd class (Persia, 1898)
- Order of the Iron Crown, 3rd class (Austria, 16 April 1904)
- Commander's Cross, First Class of the House Order of Albert the Bear (Anhalt, 1907)
- Knight's Cross of the Order of Leopold, (Austria, 24 September 1912)
- Grand Cross of the Order of Military Merit (Spain, 1910)
- Grand Cross of the Order of Military Merit (Bulgaria, 1910)
- Order of the Double Dragon, 2nd degree of 1st class (China, 1911)
- Order of the Iron Crown, 2nd class with war decoration (later with swords) (Austria, 2 December 1914)
- Military Merit Cross, 2nd class with war decoration (later with swords) (Austria-Hungary, 8 February 1915)
- Iron Cross, 1st and 2nd class (Prussia, 1915)
- Appointment to the Privy Council (16 March 1916)
- First Class Decoration of Honour for Services to the Red Cross with war decoration (2 August 1916)
- Grand Cross of the Order of the Iron Crown with war decoration (13 September 1916)
- Grand Cross of the Military Merit Order with Swords in (Bavaria, 1916)
- Order of Leopold, 1st class with war decoration and swords (Austria, 17 April 1917)
