= Ketevan Bagration of Mukhrani =

20th and 21st-century Georgian diplomat

Princess Ketevan Bagration of Mukhrani
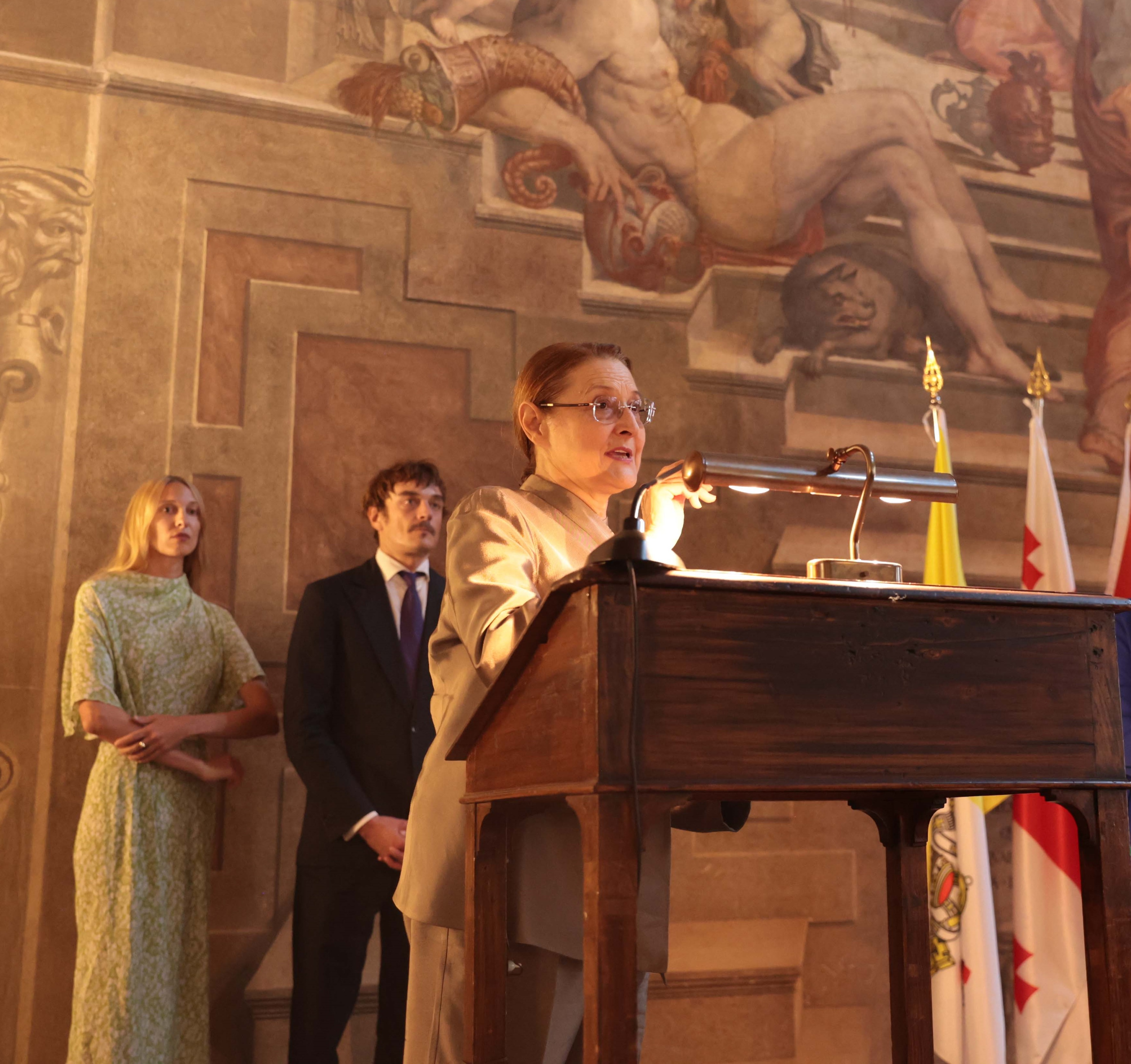
- Born: 20 July 1954 (age 71); Talence, France
- Noble family: House of Bagration-Mukhrani
- Spouse: Prince Raimondo Umberto Maria Orsini d'Aragona
- Issue: Georgiana Maria Orsini; Lelio Nicolò Orsini; Luisa Eleonora Orsini; Dorothea Orsini
- Father: Prince Constantine Bagration of Mukhrani
- Mother: Monique Pauliac

Princess Ketevan Bagration of Mukhrani also known as Khétévane Bagrationi–Orsini, Ketevan Bagrationi–Mukhraneli, or Ketevan Bagrationi–Mukhranbatoni (Georgian: ქეთევან ბაგრატიონ–მუხრანელი) (born July 20, 1954) is a French-born Italian–Georgian public figure and diplomat, who was Georgia's ambassador to the Holy See from 2005 to 2014 and again from 2019 to 2023. She has a dual French and Georgian citizenship.

== Biography ==
Princess Khétévane Bagration of Moukhrani was born in Talence, France, in 1954. Her father was Prince Constantine Bagration of Mukhrani (1915–1992), a Georgian émigré and scion of Constantine IV, the last Prince of Mukhrani, who descended from a branch of the Bagrationi royal dynasty. Her mother Monique Pauliac (born 1926) married Prince Constantine at Villenave-d'Ornon in 1953. Princess Khétévane also has a brother, Alexandré Bagration de Moukhrani (born 1956). Her distant cousins of the Spanish branch of the Mukhrani entertain claims to the throne of Georgia.

Khétévane Bagration de Moukhrani has a degree in philology. She first visited her ancestral homeland in 1975 on a scholarship from Tbilisi State University. In 1978 Princess Khétévane married the Italian aristocrat Prince Raimondo Orsini d'Aragona and moved to Rome. Since 1991, she has overseen a series of Italian–Georgian cultural events and directed several humanitarian projects for post-Soviet Georgia. She was also involved in the Italian–Georgian diplomacy. Bagration helped organize the first official visit of the President of Georgia Eduard Shevardnadze to Italy in 1997 and the first ever visit of the Pope John Paul II to Georgia in 1999. She became the first Honorary Citizen of Georgia in 1995 and was granted the dual citizenship by Georgia in 2004. On March 9, 2005, the President of Georgia Mikheil Saakashvili appointed her as Ambassador Extraordinary and Plenipotentiary of Georgia to the Holy See. She served on this position until 2014.

Khétévane Bagration de Moukhrani has been decorated with several awards by the Georgian government and Patriarchate of the Georgian Orthodox Church as well as with the Grand Cross of the Order of Pius IX by the Holy See (2007) and the Order of Albert the Bear by the House of Anhalt (2009).

== Family ==
Khétévane Bagration de Moukhrani married, on June 6, 1978, in Rome, the Italian aristocrat Prince Raimondo Umberto Maria Orsini d'Aragona, a Patrician, Conscript and Noble of Rome, Patrician of Naples, Venice, Genoa, and Ancona, Noble of Corneto, and Honorary Noble of Forlì (1931–2020). They are the parents of three daughters and a son:

- Georgiana Maria Orsini (1979–2005), the eldest daughter of the couple, was found dead at her apartment in July 2005.
- Lelio Nicolò Orsini (born 1981).
- Luisa Eleonora Orsini (born 1986).
- Dorothea Orsini (born 1990).

Prince Lelio Nicolò Orsini, like his mother, has been involved in charity and cultural activities in Georgia. He has been considered by some Georgian monarchists as the most suitable candidate for the throne of Georgia, but Khétévane Bagration herself rejected such a possibility.

== Honours ==
- Honorary citizen of Georgia (1995).
- Dame Grand Cross of the Order of Pius IX (2007).
- Dame Grand Cross of the Order of Albert the Bear (2009).

== Ancestry ==
Ancestors of Ketevan Bagration of Mukhrani

16. Prince Mikhail Bagration-Mukhransky
8. Prince Alexander Bagration-Mukhransky
17. Elisaveta Ivinskaya
4. Prince Georgi Bagration-Mukhransky
18. Prince Ioseb Tarkhan-Mouravi
9. Princess Nino Tarkhan-Mouravi
19. Princess Barbara Orbeliani
2. Prince Constantine Bagration de Moukhrani
20. Nikolai Sinelnikov
10. Alexei Sinelnikov
5. Olga Sinelnikova
22. Ivan Dournovo
11. Nadezhda Durnovo
23. Leokadia Kurovskaya
1. Princess Khétévane Bagration de Moukhrani
6. Jean-Louis Pauliac
3. Monique Pauliac
7. Marie Marguerite Yvette Gerbeaud
