= Prince Louis Charles of Prussia =

Prussian prince (1773–1796)

- Born: 5 November 1773; Berlin, Prussia
- Died: 28 December 1796 (aged 23)
- Spouse: Frederica of Mecklenburg-Strelitz (m. 1793)
- Issue among others: Prince Frederick; Frederica, Duchess of Anhalt-Dessau
Names
- German: Friedrich Ludwig Karl; English: Frederick Louis Charles
- House: Hohenzollern
- Father: Frederick William II of Prussia
- Mother: Frederika Louisa of Hesse-Darmstadt

Prince Frederick Louis Charles of Prussia (German: Friedrich Ludwig Karl; Potsdam, 5 November 1773 – Berlin, 28 December 1796) was the second son and third child of Frederick William II of Prussia and Frederika Louisa of Hesse-Darmstadt.

== Biography ==
=== Marriage and issue ===
On 26 December 1793 in Berlin, Prussia, Prince Louis married Duchess Frederica of Mecklenburg-Strelitz, youngest daughter of Charles II, Grand Duke of Mecklenburg-Strelitz and sister of Louise of Mecklenburg-Strelitz, wife of his brother Frederick.

They had three children:

- Prince Frederick Wilhelm Ludwig of Prussia (30 October 1794 - 27 July 1863); married Princess Luise of Anhalt-Bernburg (1799–1882); father of Prince George and Prince Alexander of Prussia.
- Prince Charles of Prussia (26 September 1795 - 6 April 1798) died in early childhood.
- Princess Frederica Wilhelmina Louise Amalia of Prussia (30 September 1796 - 1 January 1850); married Leopold IV, Duke of Anhalt-Dessau (1794–1871) and had issue.

Prince Louis Charles died aged 23 from diphtheria.

His widow went on to marry twice more, becoming Queen of Hanover by her last marriage.

== Ancestry ==
Ancestors of Prince Louis Charles of Prussia

8. Frederick William I of Prussia
4. Prince Augustus William of Prussia
9. Princess Sophia Dorothea of Hanover
2. Frederick William II of Prussia
10. Ferdinand Albert II, Duke of Brunswick-Wolfenbüttel
5. Duchess Luise of Brunswick-Wolfenbüttel
11. Princess Antoinette of Brunswick-Wolfenbüttel
1. Prince Louis Charles of Prussia
12. Louis VIII, Landgrave of Hesse-Darmstadt
6. Louis IX, Landgrave of Hesse-Darmstadt
13. Countess Charlotte of Hanau-Lichtenberg
3. Princess Frederica Louisa of Hesse-Darmstadt
14. Christian III, Count Palatine of Zweibrücken
7. Countess Palatine Caroline of Zweibrücken
15. Countess Caroline of Nassau-Saarbrücken
