= House and Merit Order of Peter Frederick Louis =

Civil and military order of Oldenburg

House and Merit Order of Duke Peter Frederick Louis (Haus und Verdienstorden von Herzog Peter Friedrich Ludwig)
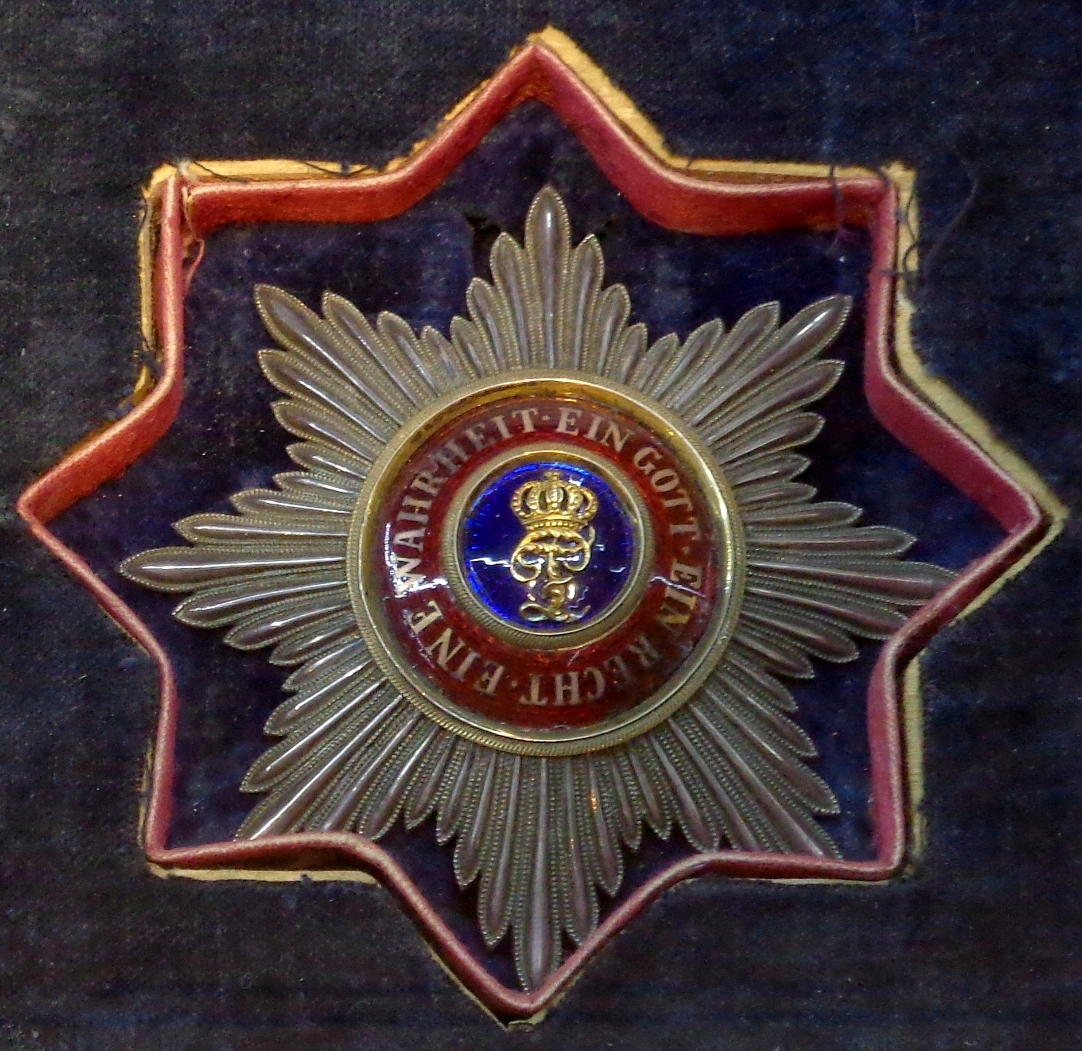
- Breast Star to the Grand Cross of the Order
- Type: Dynastic
- Established: November 27, 1838; 187 years ago
- Royal house: Grand Duchy of Oldenburg
- Motto: Ein Gott, Ein Recht, Eine Wahrheit
- Eligibility: Military personnel and civilians
- Awarded for: Civil and military merit
- Status: Obsolete
- Founder: Augustus, Grand Duke of Oldenburg
- Classes: Grand Cross with Crown; Grand Cross; Grand Commander; Commander; Officer; Knight 1st Class; Knight 2nd Class

Statistics
- Total inductees: 5,439 to 5,445 of all grades (excluding the associated honor crosses and medals)
- Ribbon of the Order

The House and Merit Order of Duke Peter Frederick Louis (German: Haus und Verdienstorden von Herzog Peter Friedrich Ludwig) or proper German Oldenburg House and Merit Order of Duke Peter Frederick Louis (German: Oldenburgischer Haus- und Verdienstorden des Herzogs Peter Friedrich Ludwig) was a civil and military order of the Grand Duchy of Oldenburg, a member state of the German Empire. The order was founded by Grand Duke Augustus of Oldenburg on 27 November 1838, to honor his father, Peter Frederick Louis of Oldenburg. It became obsolete in 1918 after the abdication of the last grand duke.

== Description ==
The badge of the order was a white-enameled cross pattée, edged in gold. The cross had a blue enameled center medallion with the crowned monogram of the Peter Frederick Louis in gold. Around the center medallion was a red-enameled ring bearing the motto "Ein Gott, Ein Recht, Eine Wahrheit" ("One God, One Law, One Truth"). Both the center medallion and the ring were edged with a gold rim. On the reverse, the coat of arms of Oldenburg were painted on the medallion. Each arm on the reverse carried dates written in a cursive script: "17 Jan. 1775", "6 Juli 1785", "21 Mai 1829", and "27 Nov. 1838". These dates corresponded to the dates of birth, accession to the throne and death of Peter Frederick Louis, as well as the date of the founding of the order.

The star of the order was an eight-pointed silver star bearing the medallion of the badge.

The ribbon of the order was deep blue with a narrow red stripe near each edge.

== Classes ==
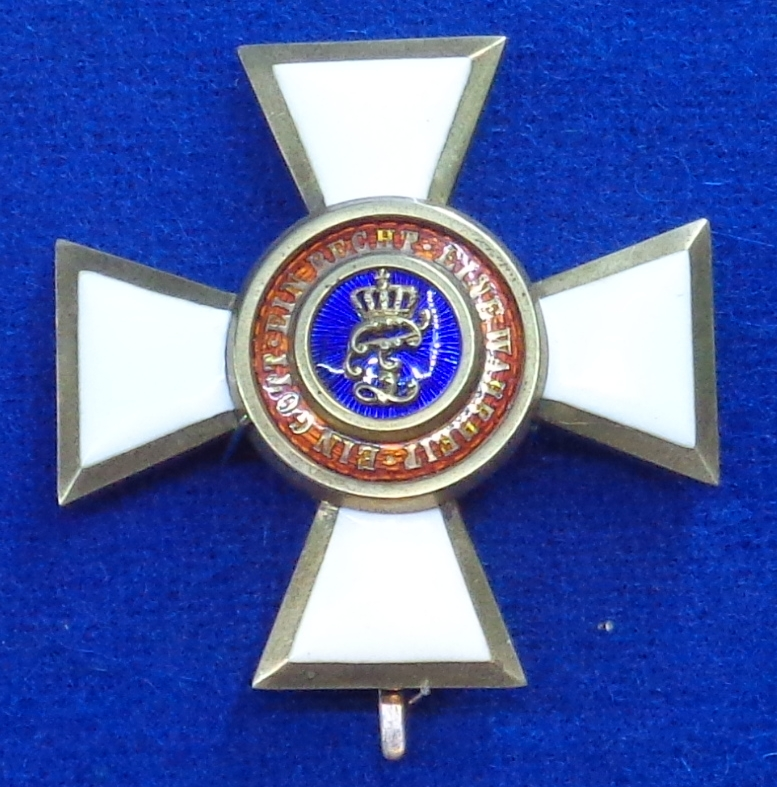
Officer's cross of the House and Merit Order of Duke Peter Frederick Louis

The order came in seven classes: Grand Cross with Crown (Großkreuz mit der Krone), Grand Cross (Großkreuz), Grand Commander (Großkomtur), Commander (Komtur), Officer (Offizier), and Knight 1st and 2nd Class (Ritter 1. und 2. Klasse). The Grand Cross with Crown and the Grand Cross consisted of a sash badge and breast star. The Grand Commander consisted of a neck badge and breast star, while the Commander was the neck badge without the star. The Officer's Cross, added in 1903, was a pinback breast badge and differed from the other badges by having a blank reverse and no crown. The Knight 1st and 2nd Class were breast badges, and the 2nd Class differed from the 1st class by not having a crown and being in silver instead of gold (the monogram and motto remained gold, however).

A special chapter of the order, the capitular knights, open only to Oldenburgers, had a badge which consisted of the medallion, surrounded by a green enameled wreath of oak leaves. It came in several classes whose badge differed in whether it was gold or silver and whether it was crowned.

Associated with the order were honor crosses for lower-ranking military personnel and civilians. The honor crosses were in gold, silver and iron. In 1910, gold, silver and bronze medals were added as additional lower-ranking awards.

All grades of the order except the medals could be awarded with swords for war merit. The swords were applied diagonally between the arms of the cross. If a recipient of a lower grade with swords received a higher grade without, he wore "swords on ring" on the higher award. These were crossed swords above the badge, usually on the ring from which the badge was suspended (in the case of the Officer's Cross, they were affixed to the top arm). In October 1918, an additional provision was made for a war decoration of a wreath of laurels affixed to the badge and breast star.

== Recipients ==
=== Grand Crosses ===
- Abbas II of Egypt
- Abdulaziz
- Prince Adalbert of Bavaria (1828–1875)
- Prince Adalbert of Prussia (1811–1873)
- Prince Adalbert of Prussia (1884–1948)
- Prince Adolf of Schaumburg-Lippe
- Duke Adolf Friedrich of Mecklenburg
- Adolphe, Grand Duke of Luxembourg
- Adolphus Frederick V, Grand Duke of Mecklenburg-Strelitz
- Albert I of Belgium
- Prince Albert of Prussia (1809–1872)
- Prince Albert of Saxe-Altenburg
- Albert of Saxony
- Prince Albert of Prussia (1837–1906)
- Albrecht, Duke of Württemberg
- Alexander II of Russia
- Alexander III of Russia
- Alexander Frederick, Landgrave of Hesse
- Alexander of Battenberg
- Duke Alexander of Oldenburg
- Prince Alexander of Prussia
- Grand Duke Alexander Mikhailovich of Russia
- Grand Duke Alexei Alexandrovich of Russia
- Prince Alfons of Bavaria
- Alfred I, Prince of Windisch-Grätz
- Alfred, 2nd Prince of Montenuovo
- Grand Duke Andrei Vladimirovich of Russia
- Augustus, Grand Duke of Oldenburg
- Bernhard III, Duke of Saxe-Meiningen
- Theobald von Bethmann Hollweg
- Herbert von Bismarck
- Otto von Bismarck
- Leonhard Graf von Blumenthal
- Max von Boehn (general)
- Walther Bronsart von Schellendorff
- Bernhard von Bülow
- Karl von Bülow
- Eduard von Capelle
- Leo von Caprivi
- Carol I of Romania
- Prince Charles of Prussia
- Charles I of Württemberg
- Charles Alexander, Grand Duke of Saxe-Weimar-Eisenach
- Charles Augustus, Hereditary Grand Duke of Saxe-Weimar-Eisenach (1844–1894)
- Chlodwig, Prince of Hohenlohe-Schillingsfürst
- Christian VIII of Denmark
- Christian X of Denmark
- Christoph, Prince of Schleswig-Holstein
- Duke Constantine Petrovich of Oldenburg
- Rudolf von Delbrück
- Edward VII
- Prince Eitel Friedrich of Prussia
- Duke Elimar of Oldenburg
- Prince Ernest Augustus, 3rd Duke of Cumberland and Teviotdale
- Ernest Louis, Grand Duke of Hesse
- Ernst I, Duke of Saxe-Altenburg
- Ernst II, Duke of Saxe-Altenburg
- Duke Eugen of Württemberg (1846–1877)
- Eduard von Fransecky
- Archduke Franz Ferdinand of Austria
- Franz Joseph I of Austria
- Archduke Franz Karl of Austria
- Frederick Augustus II, Grand Duke of Oldenburg
- Frederick Augustus III of Saxony
- Prince Frederick Charles of Hesse
- Frederick Francis II, Grand Duke of Mecklenburg-Schwerin
- Frederick Francis III, Grand Duke of Mecklenburg-Schwerin
- Frederick Francis IV, Grand Duke of Mecklenburg-Schwerin
- Frederick I, Duke of Anhalt
- Frederick I, Grand Duke of Baden
- Frederick II, Grand Duke of Baden
- Frederick III, German Emperor
- Prince Frederick of Prussia (1794–1863)
- Prince Frederick of Württemberg
- Frederick William III, Landgrave of Hesse
- Frederick William IV of Prussia
- Frederick William, Grand Duke of Mecklenburg-Strelitz
- Prince Frederick of the Netherlands
- Friedrich Ferdinand, Duke of Schleswig-Holstein
- Prince Friedrich Karl of Prussia (1828–1885)
- Prince Friedrich Leopold of Prussia
- Frederik VII of Denmark
- Frederik VIII of Denmark
- Georg, Crown Prince of Saxony
- Georg II, Duke of Saxe-Meiningen
- Georg Alexander, Duke of Mecklenburg
- Duke Georg August of Mecklenburg-Strelitz
- George V of Hanover
- George Albert, Prince of Schwarzburg-Rudolstadt
- Prince George of Prussia
- George, King of Saxony
- George Victor, Prince of Waldeck and Pyrmont
- Günther Friedrich Karl II, Prince of Schwarzburg-Sondershausen
- Gustaf V
- Gustaf VI Adolf
- Prince Harald of Denmark
- Leopold Freiherr von Hauer
- Duke Henry of Mecklenburg-Schwerin
- Prince Henry of Prussia (1862–1929)
- Prince Henry of the Netherlands (1820–1879)
- Paul von Hindenburg
- Henning von Holtzendorff
- Dietrich von Hülsen-Haeseler
- Isma'il Pasha
- Prince Joachim of Prussia
- Archduke John of Austria
- Prince Johann of Schleswig-Holstein-Sonderburg-Glücksburg
- John of Saxony
- Duke John Albert of Mecklenburg
- Archduke Joseph Karl of Austria
- Joseph, Duke of Saxe-Altenburg
- Georg von Kameke
- Karl Anton, Prince of Hohenzollern
- Karl, Duke of Schleswig-Holstein-Sonderburg-Glücksburg
- Hans von Koester
- Grand Duke Konstantin Konstantinovich of Russia
- Grand Duke Konstantin Nikolayevich of Russia
- Prince Kraft of Hohenlohe-Ingelfingen
- Leopold I of Belgium
- Leopold II of Belgium
- Leopold IV, Duke of Anhalt
- George Maximilianovich, 6th Duke of Leuchtenberg
- Louis III, Grand Duke of Hesse
- Louis IV, Grand Duke of Hesse
- Erich Ludendorff
- Ludwig I of Bavaria
- Ludwig II of Bavaria
- Ludwig III of Bavaria
- Luitpold, Prince Regent of Bavaria
- Edwin Freiherr von Manteuffel
- Georg von der Marwitz
- Maximilian II of Bavaria
- Grand Duke Michael Alexandrovich of Russia
- Grand Duke Michael Nikolaevich of Russia
- Milan I of Serbia
- Helmuth von Moltke the Elder
- Prince Moritz of Saxe-Altenburg
- Georg Alexander von Müller
- Nicholas I of Russia
- Nicholas II of Russia
- Nicholas Alexandrovich, Tsesarevich of Russia
- Grand Duke Nicholas Konstantinovich of Russia
- Grand Duke Nicholas Nikolaevich of Russia (1831–1891)
- Grand Duke Nicholas Nikolaevich of Russia (1856–1929)
- August Ludwig von Nostitz
- Otto of Greece
- Grand Duke Paul Alexandrovich of Russia
- Duke Paul Frederick of Mecklenburg
- Peter II, Grand Duke of Oldenburg
- Duke Peter of Oldenburg
- Grand Duke Peter Nikolaevich of Russia
- Philipp, Prince of Eulenburg
- Karl von Plettenberg
- Prince Frederick William of Hesse-Kassel
- Antoni Wilhelm Radziwiłł
- Albrecht von Roon
- Rupprecht, Crown Prince of Bavaria
- Reinhard Scheer
- Eberhard Graf von Schmettow
- Gustav von Senden-Bibran
- Grand Duke Sergei Alexandrovich of Russia
- Grand Duke Sergei Mikhailovich of Russia
- Dmitry Shcherbachev
- Archduke Stephen of Austria (Palatine of Hungary)
- Otto Graf zu Stolberg-Wernigerode
- Tewfik Pasha
- Alfred von Tirpitz
- Grand Duke Vladimir Alexandrovich of Russia
- Alfred von Waldersee
- Wilhelm, German Crown Prince
- Wilhelm II, German Emperor
- Wilhelmina of the Netherlands
- William I of Württemberg
- William I, German Emperor
- William II of Württemberg
- Prince William of Baden (1829–1897)
- Prince William of Hesse-Philippsthal-Barchfeld
- Duke William of Mecklenburg-Schwerin
- William, Duke of Brunswick
- William, Prince of Hohenzollern
- William Ernest, Grand Duke of Saxe-Weimar-Eisenach
- Friedrich Graf von Wrangel

=== Commanders ===
- Wilhelm Heye
- Oskar von Hutier
- Hans von Kirchbach
- Hubert von Rebeur-Paschwitz
- Alfred von Schlieffen
- Julius von Verdy du Vernois

=== Knights 1st Class ===
- Joachim von Amsberg (general)
- Friedrich Boedicker
- Alexander von Falkenhausen
- Friedrich Ritter von Haack
- Fritz von Loßberg

=== Knights 2nd Class ===
- Franz Ritter von Epp
- Heino von Heimburg
- Erich Raeder
- Otto Schultze
- Alf Scott-Hansen Sr.

=== Unclassified ===
- Christian Griepenkerl
- Karl Wilhelm Heinrich von Kleist
- Peter II, Grand Duke of Oldenburg
- Arkady Skugarevsky

== References and notes ==
- This article incorporates information translated from the 4th Edition of Meyers Konversations-Lexikon, a German encyclopedia now in the public domain published between 1885 and 1892 by the Bibliographisches Institut Leipzig und Wien.
- Robert Werlich, Orders and Decorations of all Nations (Quaker Press, 2nd edition 1974).
- Das Kapitularzeichen des Haus und Verdienst Ordens des Herzogs Peter Friedrich Ludwig, an article on the badge of the capitular knights from the website Imperial German Orders, Medals & Decorations / Kaiserlich Deutsche Orden & Ehrenzeichen
