= Marie Friederike of Hesse-Kassel =

Duchess of Anhalt-Bernburg (1768–1839)

Marie Friederike
- Duchess of Anhalt-Bernburg
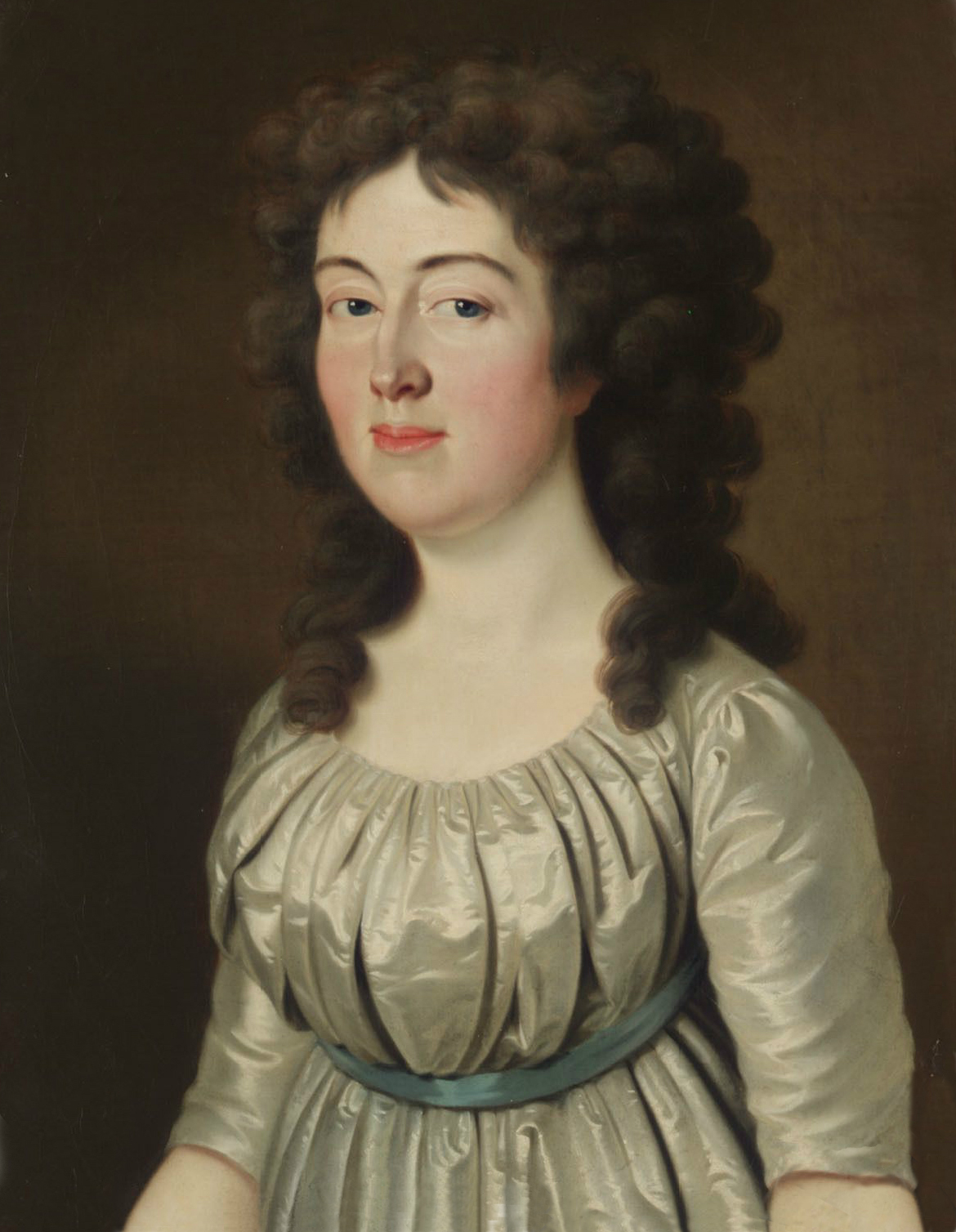
- Portrait by Karl Christian Kehrer
- Born: 14 September 1768; Hanau
- Died: 17 April 1839 (aged 70); Hanau
- Spouse: Alexius Frederick Christian, Duke of Anhalt-Bernburg (m. 1794; div. 1817)
- Issue: Princess Catherine; Louise, Princess Frederick of Prussia; Frederick Amadeus, Hereditary Prince of Anhalt-Bernburg; Alexander Karl, Duke of Anhalt-Bernburg
Names
- German: Marie Friederike
- House: Hesse-Kassel
- Father: William I, Elector of Hesse
- Mother: Princess Wilhelmina Caroline of Denmark and Norway

Marie Frederike of Hesse-Kassel (14 September 1768, Hanau – 17 April 1839, Hanau) was a German noblewoman and by marriage Princess and later Duchess of Anhalt-Bernburg.

She was a daughter of William I, Elector of Hesse, and his wife, Princess Wilhelmina Caroline of Denmark.

== Life ==
On 29 November 1794 she married Alexius Frederick Christian, Duke of Anhalt-Bernburg. They had four children, of whom only two survived to adulthood:

1. Princess Katharine Wilhelmine (b. Kassel, 1 January 1796 – d. Kassel, 24 February 1796).
2. Princess Wilhelmine Louise (b. Ballenstedt, 30 October 1799 – d. Schloss Eller, 9 December 1882), married on 21 November 1817 to Prince Frederick William Louis of Prussia, grandson of King Frederick William II of Prussia and maternal half-brother of King George V of Hanover. She was the mother of Prince George of Prussia.
3. Frederick Amadeus, Hereditary Prince of Anhalt-Bernburg (b. Ballenstedt, 19 April 1801 – d. Ballenstedt, 24 May 1801).
4. Alexander Karl, Duke of Anhalt-Bernburg (b. Ballenstedt, 2 March 1805 – d. Hoym, 19 August 1863).

Shortly after her marriage, Marie Friederike showed signs of mental illness (a disease that eventually her two surviving children inherited), which led to inconsistencies in the Bernburg court. Finally, her husband obtained a divorce on 6 August 1817.

The former Duchess returned to her homeland, Hanau. On her death, she was buried on 22 April 1839 in the Marienkirche in Hanau (then a Reformed church).

== Bibliography ==
- Sabine Köttelwesch: Geliebte, Gemahlinnen und Mätressen. Zehn Frauenschicksale aus dem Umfeld des Kasseler Fürstenhofes (Die Geschichte unserer Heimat 41), Hofgeismar 2004. S. 85-98.
- Detlev Schwennicke: Europäische Stammtafeln ("Stammtafeln zur Geschichte der europäischen Staaten/Neue Folge; 3). Klostermann, Frankfurt/M. 2000, Tafel 255ff.
- Reinhard Suchier: Die Grabmonumente und Särge der in Hanau bestatteten Personen aus den Häusern Hanau und Hessen. In: Programm des Königlichen Gymnasiums zu Hanau. Hanau 1879. S. 1 - 56.
