= Prince Frederick of Prussia (1794–1863) =

German general

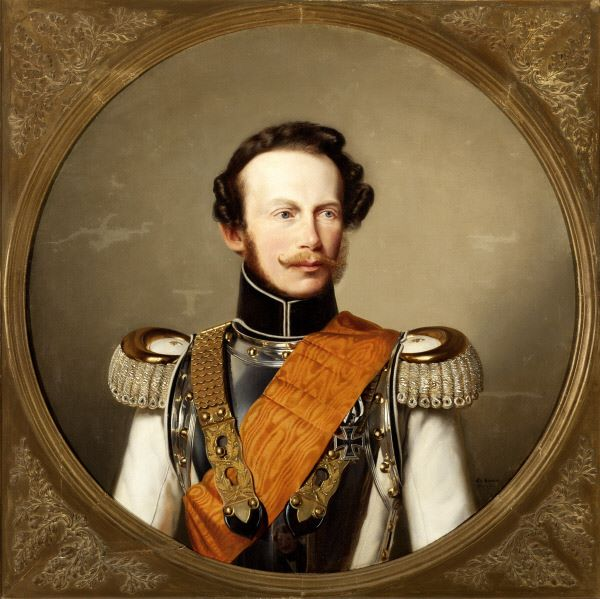
- Prince Frederick in 1836
- Born: 30 October 1794; Berlin, Kingdom of Prussia
- Died: 27 July 1863 (aged 68); Berlin, Kingdom of Prussia
- Spouse: Princess Louise of Anhalt-Bernburg (m. 1817)
- Issue: Prince Alexander; Prince George
Names
- English: Frederick William Louis; German: Friedrich Wilhelm Ludwig
- House: Hohenzollern
- Father: Prince Louis Charles of Prussia
- Mother: Frederica of Mecklenburg-Strelitz

Prince Frederick William Louis of Prussia (German: Friedrich Wilhelm Ludwig; 30 October 1794 – 27 July 1863) was a Prussian prince and military officer.

== Family ==
Born in Berlin, Frederick was the son of Prince Louis Charles of Prussia and Duchess Frederica of Mecklenburg-Strelitz, later Queen of Hanover, nephew of King Frederick William III of Prussia and stepson of Ernest Augustus, King of Hanover.

Princess Charlotte of Wales was interested in Frederick in 1814 and hoped to marry him. The pair met several times. However, the Prince suddenly got engaged to the daughter of Alexius Frederick Christian, Duke of Anhalt-Bernburg, Princess Louise of Anhalt-Bernburg, whom he married on 21 November 1817 at Ballenstedt. The couple had two sons:

- Prince Alexander of Prussia (1820–1896), an army officer
- Prince George of Prussia (1826–1902), an army officer, poet and playwright

Although both of their sons lived to advanced age, neither of them married or fathered any children.

== Life in Düsseldorf ==
From 1815 until his death, the Prince served as the Commander of 1st (Silesian) Life Cuirassiers "Great Elector". He resided in a palace in Wilhelmstrasse until 1820, when he became Commander of the 20th Division in Düsseldorf and moved to Jägerhof Castle. He had two more wings built during his stay in the castle. The castle soon became the center of social and cultural life of the city, as the Prince and Princess Frederick were both interested in art and talented artists themselves. Prince Frederick was among the founders of the Düsseldorf art, music and drama club and served as its patron.

Much like his cousin, King Frederick William IV of Prussia, Frederick displayed interest in the Middle Ages and the castles of Rhine Province. He acquired Fatzberg Castle, turned it into his summer residence and named it Burg Rheinstein.

== Last years in Berlin ==
He was recalled to Berlin during the Revolutions of 1848 in the German states. His popularity in Düsseldorf was such that he was appointed the first honorary citizen of the city in 1856. Frederick had separated from his wife the previous year, due to her chronic nervous disease. She lived at Eller near Düsseldorf, where he visited her on their common birthday.

Frederick, his wife and younger son are buried in a chapel he had built at Burg Rheinstein.

The town of Fredericksburg, Texas, also known as Fritzburg, was named after Frederick by the town's founder baron John O. Meusebach.

== In popular culture ==
In the first season of the Netflix original show Bridgerton, Prince Frederick is one of the love interests of the main character, Daphne Bridgerton. He is portrayed by English actor Freddie Stroma. His name in the show is spelled as Friedrich, the traditional German spelling.

== Honours ==
He received the following orders and decorations:

- Kingdom of Prussia:
  - Knight of the Black Eagle, 30 October 1804; with Collar, 1812
  - Grand Commander's Cross of the Royal House Order of Hohenzollern
  - Iron Cross (1813) "Honour Senior", 2nd Class
  - Service Award Cross
- Hohenzollern: Cross of Honour of the Princely House Order of Hohenzollern, 1st Class
- Ascanian duchies: Grand Cross of the Order of Albert the Bear, 14 October 1838
- Austrian Empire: Grand Cross of the Royal Hungarian Order of St. Stephen, 1852
- Baden:
  - Knight of the House Order of Fidelity, 1840
  - Grand Cross of the Zähringer Lion, 1840
- Kingdom of Hanover:
  - Grand Cross of the Royal Guelphic Order, 1821
  - Knight of St. George, 1839
- Electorate of Hesse: Grand Cross of the Golden Lion, 26 December 1817
- Grand Duchy of Hesse: Grand Cross of the Ludwig Order, 8 November 1849
- Netherlands: Grand Cross of the Netherlands Lion
- Luxembourg: Grand Cross of the Oak Crown
- Oldenburg: Grand Cross of the Order of Duke Peter Friedrich Ludwig, with Golden Crown, 27 May 1858
- Russian Empire:
  - Knight of St. Andrew
  - Knight of the White Eagle
  - Knight of St. George, 4th Class

== Ancestry ==
Ancestors of Prince Frederick of Prussia (1794–1863)

8. Prince Augustus William of Prussia
4. Frederick William II of Prussia
9. Duchess Luise of Brunswick-Wolfenbüttel
2. Prince Louis Charles of Prussia
10. Louis IX, Landgrave of Hesse-Darmstadt
5. Princess Frederica Louisa of Hesse-Darmstadt
11. Countess Palatine Caroline of Zweibrücken
1. Prince Frederick of Prussia
12. Duke Charles Louis Frederick of Mecklenburg-Strelitz
6. Charles II, Grand Duke of Mecklenburg-Strelitz
13. Princess Elisabeth Albertine of Saxe-Hildburghausen
3. Duchess Frederica of Mecklenburg-Strelitz
14. Prince George William of Hesse-Darmstadt
7. Princess Friederike of Hesse-Darmstadt
15. Countess Maria Louise Albertine of Leiningen-Dagsburg-Falkenburg

== Bibliography ==
- Williams, Kate (2008). Becoming Queen Victoria. New York: Ballantine Books. ISBN 978-0-345-46195-7.
- King, Irene M. (1967). John O. Meusebach: German colonizer in Texas. University of Texas Press.
