= Alexander Karl, Duke of Anhalt-Bernburg =

Duke of Anhalt-Bernburg (1805–1863)

Alexander Charles
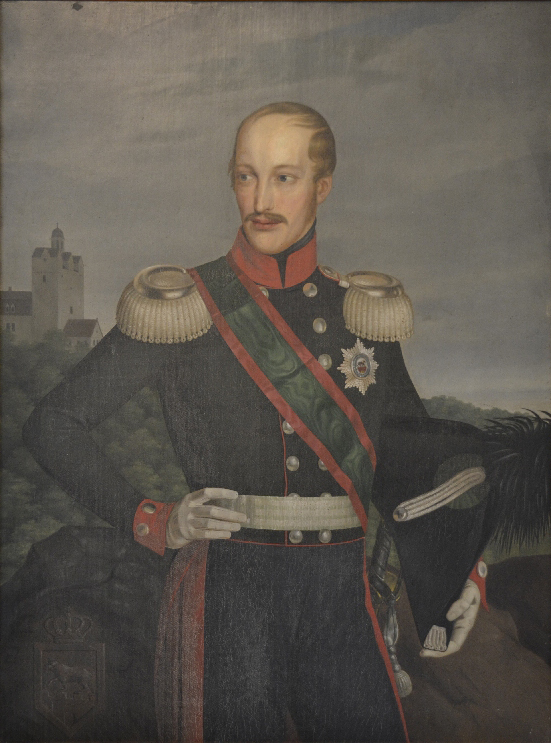
- Portrait by Wilhelm von Kügelgen

Duke of Anhalt-Bernburg
- Reign: 24 March 1834 – 19 August 1863
- Predecessor: Alexius
- Successor: monarchy abolished
- Born: 2 March 1805; Ballenstedt, Duchy of Anhalt-Bernburg, Holy Roman Empire
- Died: 19 August 1863 (aged 58); Hoym, Anhalt-Bernburg, German Confederation
- Spouse: Princess Friederike of Schleswig-Holstein-Sonderburg-Glücksburg (m. 1834)
Names
- German: Alexander Karl
- House: Ascania
- Father: Alexius Frederick Christian, Duke of Anhalt-Bernburg
- Mother: Marie Friederike of Hesse-Kassel

Alexander Charles, Duke of Anhalt-Bernburg (2 March 1805 – 19 August 1863) was a German prince of the House of Ascania. From 1834 until 1863 he was the last duke of the Duchy of Anhalt-Bernburg.

== Life ==
=== Early life ===
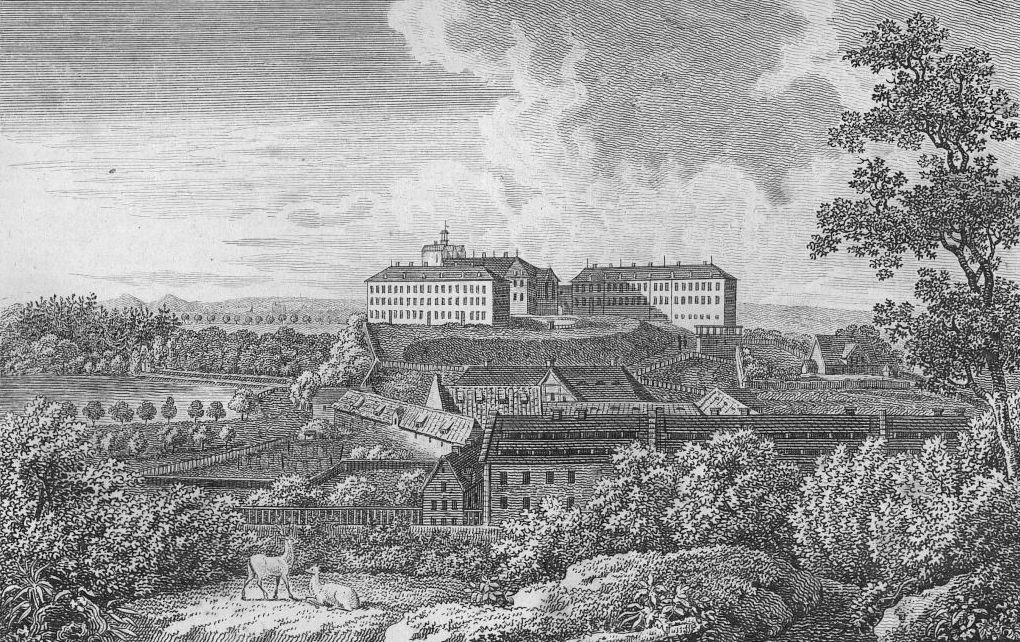
Alexander Charles' birthplace Ballenstedt Castle in 1837.

Alexander Charles was born at Ballenstedt on 2 March 1805 as the second (but eldest and only surviving) son of Alexius Frederick Christian, Duke of Anhalt-Bernburg, by his first wife Maria Fredericka, daughter of William I, Elector of Hesse.

=== Succession ===
After the death of his father in 1834, Alexander Karl succeeded him in Anhalt-Bernburg.

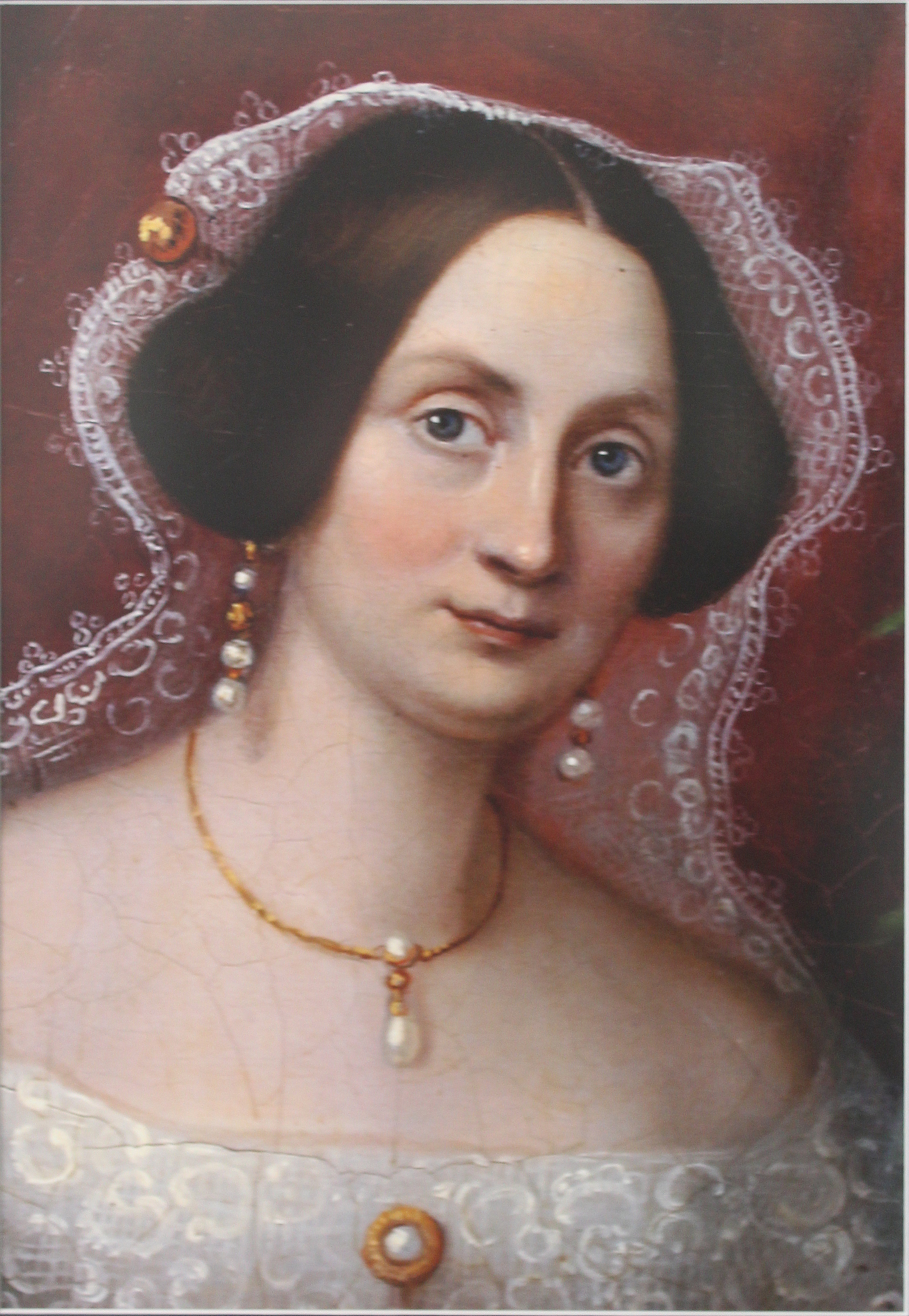
His wife, Princess Friederike of Schleswig-Holstein-Sonderburg-Glücksburg

=== Marriage ===
In Gottorp on 30 October 1834 Alexander Karl married Princess Friederike of Schleswig-Holstein-Sonderburg-Glücksburg, daughter of Frederick William, Duke of Schleswig-Holstein-Sonderburg-Glücksburg and his wife Princess Louise Caroline of Hesse-Kassel; she was also a sister of the later King Christian IX of Denmark. The union was childless.

=== Reign ===
By November 1855 the Duke was confined to Schloss Hoym due to a progressive mental illness (some sources state that he had schizophrenia). There, Alexander Karl spend the rest of his life under medical care in the company of his chamberlain, the painter Wilhelm von Kügelgen.

Due to his incapacity, his wife Friederike acted as regent.

=== Death ===
Alexander Charles died at Hoym on 19 August 1863. As the marriage produced no issue, with him, the line of Anhalt-Bernburg became extinct. The Duchy of Anhalt-Bernburg was inherited by his kinsman Leopold IV, Duke of Anhalt-Dessau-Köthen who merged the duchy with his own to form a united Duchy of Anhalt.

== Bibliography ==
- Johannes Werner and Paul Siegwart von Kügelgen (eds.): Wilhelm von Kügelgen – Lebenserinnerungen des Alten Mannes, 1840–1867. K. F. Koehler, Leipzig 1923.
- Alexander Boroffka: Die Geisteskrankheit des Herzogs Alexander Carl von Anhalt-Bernburg (1805–1863). Eine Psychopathographie. Verein der Freunde und Förderer der Kulturstiftung Bernburg e. V. Bernburg 1995.
- Landesarchiv Sachsen-Anhalt: correspondence of the ducal family of Anhalt-Bernburg incl. Herzog Alexander Carl

== Ancestry ==
Ancestors of Alexander Karl, Duke of Anhalt-Bernburg

8. Victor Frederick, Prince of Anhalt-Bernburg
4. Frederick Albert, Prince of Anhalt-Bernburg
9. Albertine of Brandenburg-Schwedt
2. Alexius Frederick Christian, Duke of Anhalt-Bernburg
10. Frederick Charles, Duke of Schleswig-Holstein-Sonderburg-Plön
5. Louise Albertine of Schleswig-Holstein-Sonderburg-Plön
11. Christine Armgard von Reventlow
1. Alexander Karl, Duke of Anhalt-bernburg
12. Frederick II, Landgrave of Hesse-Kassel
6. William I, Elector of Hesse
13. Princess Mary of Great Britain
3. Marie Friederike of Hesse-Kassel
14. Frederick V of Denmark
7. Princess Wilhelmina Caroline of Denmark
15. Louise of Great Britain

Preceded by Alexius Frederick Christian	Duke of Anhalt-Bernburg; 1834–1863	Succeeded by Leopold IV
