= Alexius Frederick Christian, Duke of Anhalt-Bernburg =

Prince/Duke of Anhalt-Bernburg (1767–1834)

Alexius Frederick Christian
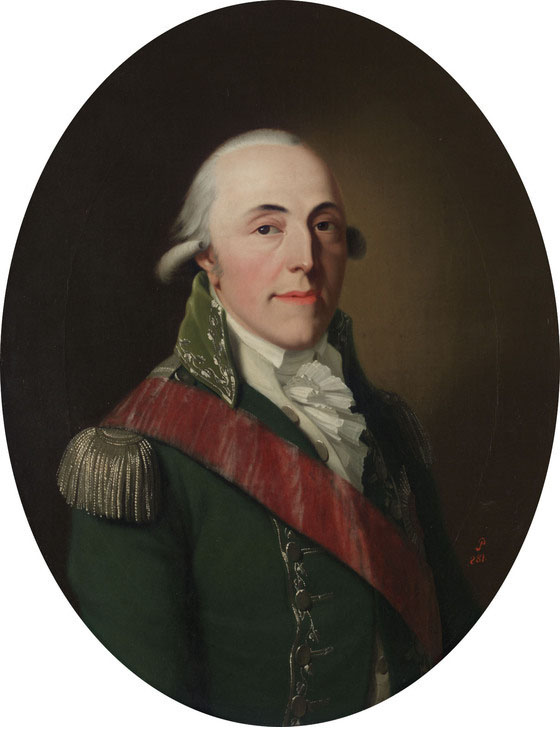
- Portrait by Karl Christian Kehrer, c. 1796

Prince/Duke of Anhalt-Bernburg
- Reign: 9 April 1796–24 March 1834
- Predecessor: Frederick Albert
- Successor: Alexander Karl
- Born: 12 June 1767; Ballenstedt, Anhalt, Holy Roman Empire
- Died: 24 March 1834 (aged 66); Ballenstedt, Anhalt
- Spouse: Landgravine Maria Fredericka of Hesse-Kassel (m. 1794; div. 1817) Dorothea von Sonnenberg (m. 1818; died 1818) Ernestine von Sonnenberg (m. 1819)
- Issue: Catherine; Luise, Princess Frederick of Prussia; Frederick; Alexander Karl
Names
- Alexius Frederick Christian; German: Alexius Friedrich Christian
- House: Ascania
- Father: Frederick Albert, Prince of Anhalt-Bernburg
- Mother: Louise Albertine of Schleswig-Holstein-Sonderburg-Plön

Alexius Frederick Christian of Anhalt-Bernburg (12 June 1767 – 24 March 1834) was a German prince of the House of Ascania. From 1796 until 1806, he was Reigning prince of the principality of Anhalt-Bernburg, and from 1806 until 1834, the first Duke of the Duchy of Anhalt-Bernburg.

== Life ==
Alexius Frederick Christian was born on 12 June 1767 at Ballenstedt. He was the only son of Frederick Albert, Prince of Anhalt-Bernburg, by his wife Louise Albertine, daughter of Frederick Carl, Duke of Schleswig-Holstein-Sonderburg-Plön.

From early childhood, he and his sister Pauline received an excellent education. After the death of his father in 1796, Alexius Frederick Christian inherited Anhalt-Bernburg.

The territories of Anhalt-Bernburg were augmented one year later with the formal division of Anhalt-Zerbst in 1797; Alexius Frederick Christian received the towns of Coswig and Mühlingen, which represented 1/3 of the defunct principality. In 1812, with the extinction of the Anhalt-Bernburg-Schaumburg-Hoym branch of the House of Ascania, he inherited Hoym and some Prussian enclaves.

Alexius improved education with the building and enlargement of many churches and schools. He demonstrated a special interest in expanding the road network, especially in the newly acquired areas of his principality. The mining and metallurgical industry also benefited from his attention. Alexius Frederick Christian initiated several major construction projects, such as the Saalebrücke in Bernburg (Saale), which was later destroyed. In 1810 he founded the Alexisbad in Selketal and later, in the Prussian area of Gernrode, he created the Beringer Bad.

In matters of religion, he was tolerant and enlightened; in 1820 he finally declared the Reformist and Lutheran faiths to be the official co-religions of his state. In 1826 he joined the German Zollverein and in 1829 created a civil fund for orphans, widows, and servants.

The Emperor Francis II elevated him to the rank of Duke in 1807. After the dissolution of the Holy Roman Empire, Alexius Frederick Christian, with his kinsmans the Dukes of Anhalt-Dessau and Anhalt-Köthen, joined the Confederation of the Rhine. Some of his troops fought for Napoleon in Tyrol, Spain, Russia, Gdańsk, and Kulm. On 13 December 1813 he resigned from the Confederation of the Rhine and sent his troops with his allies in 1814 and 1815 to Belgium and France. On 8 June 1815 he joined the German Confederation.

Duke Alexius Frederick Christian died at Ballenstedt on 24 March 1834.

== Marriages and issue ==
Royal monogram

In Kassel on 29 November 1794 Alexius Frederick Christian married Maria Fredericka, daughter of William I, Elector of Hesse. They had four children:

1. Katharine Wilhelmine (b. Kassel, 1 January 1796 – d. Kassel, 24 February 1796).
2. Wilhelmine Louise (b. Ballenstedt, 30 October 1799 – d. Schloss Eller, 9 December 1882), married on 21 November 1817 to Prince Frederick William Louis of Prussia, grandson of King Frederick William II of Prussia and uterine half-brother of King George V of Hanover. She was the mother of Prince George of Prussia.
3. Frederick Amadeus, Hereditary Prince of Anhalt-Bernburg (b. Ballenstedt, 19 April 1801 – d. Ballenstedt, 24 May 1801).
4. Alexander Karl, Duke of Anhalt-Bernburg (b. Ballenstedt, 2 March 1805 – d. Hoym, 19 August 1863).

The union was completely unhappy and the couple divorced in 1817.

In Ballenstedt on 11 January 1818, Alexius Frederick Christian married secondly and morganatically with Dorothea Fredericka of Sonnenberg (b. Bernburg, 23 January 1781 – d. Ballenstedt, 23 May 1818), who shortly after the wedding was ennobled and created Baroness of Hoym (German: Frau von Hoym). The union only lasted four months until Dorothea's death.

In Bernburg on 2 May 1819 Alexius Frederick Christian married thirdly and again morganatically with Ernestine Charlotte of Sonnenberg (b. Bernburg, 19 February 1789 – d. Ballenstedt, 28 September 1845), sister of his second wife. As she, Ernestine was created Baroness of Hoym shortly after the wedding. This marriage was childless.

Preceded by Frederick Albert	Prince of Anhalt-Bernburg; 1796–1807	Succeeded by Principality elevated to the rank of Duchy
New creation	Duke of Anhalt-Bernburg; 1807–1834	Succeeded by Alexander Karl
Preceded by Frederick	Prince of Anhalt-Bernburg-Schaumburg-Hoym (in Hoym); 1812–1834	Succeeded by Alexander Karl
