= Rheinstein Castle =

Castle in Germany

- Burg Rheinstein
- Trechtingshausen
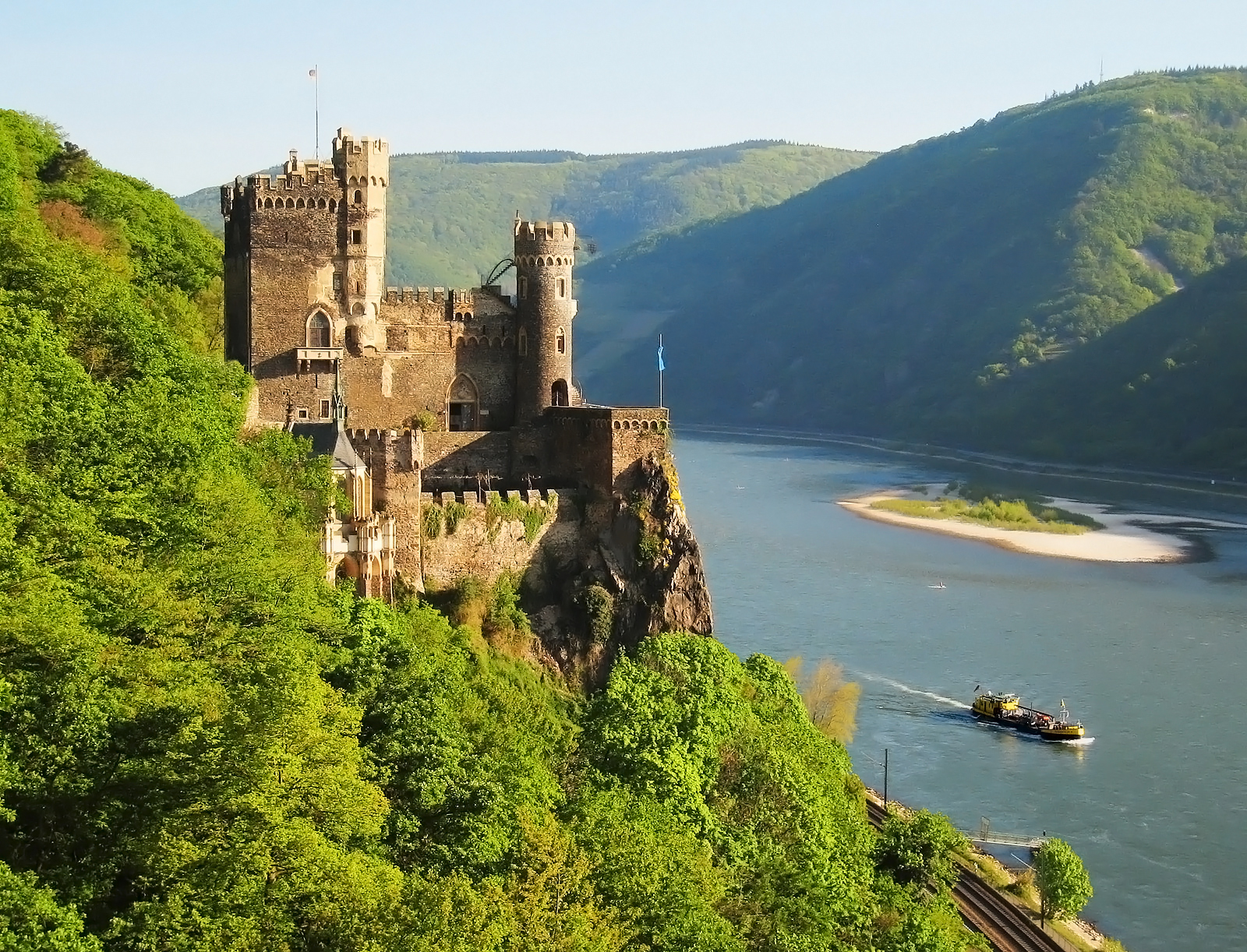

Site information
- Type: Medieval castle
- Owner: The Hecher Family
- Open to the public: open to public

Location
- Coordinates: 49°59′37.3″N 7°51′30.34″E

Site history
- Built: 1316 – (rebuilt: 1825-1844)

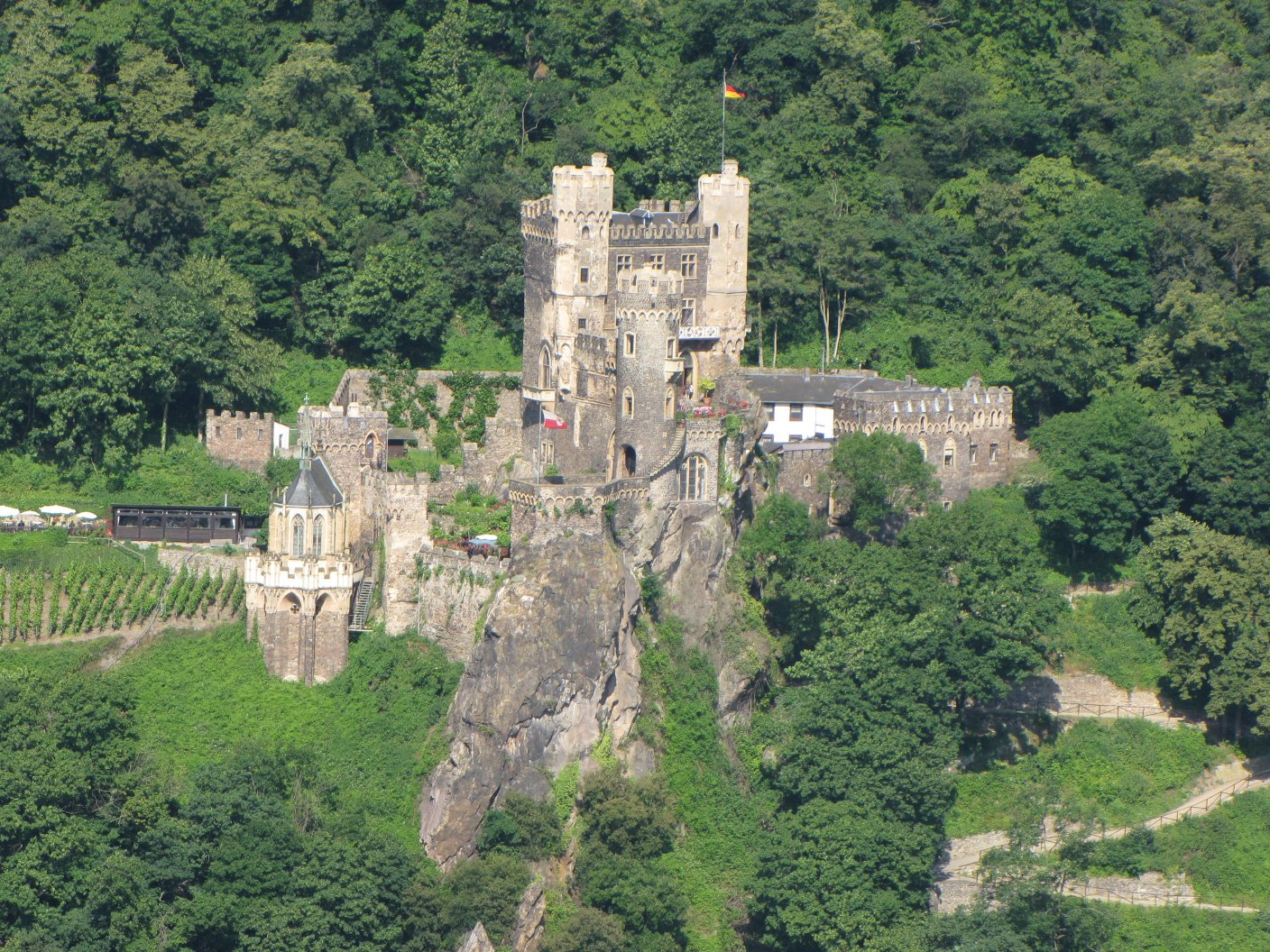

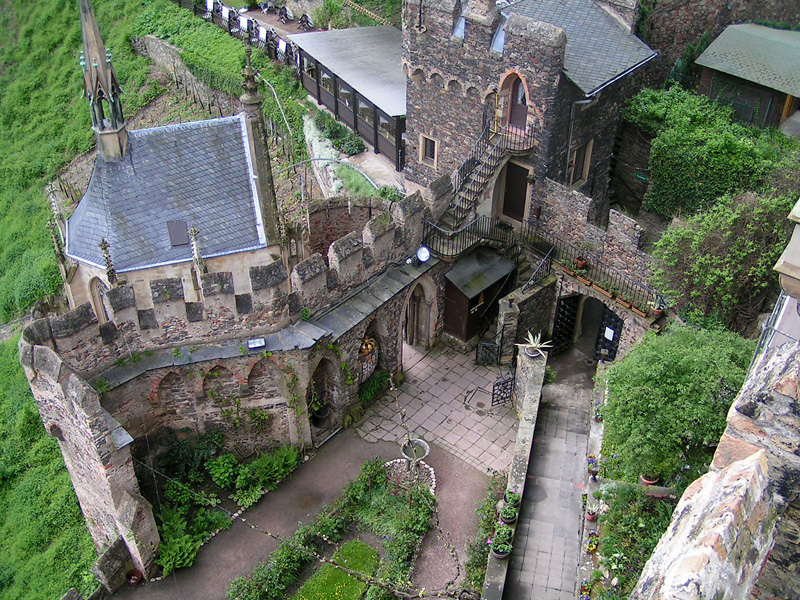
Inner yard

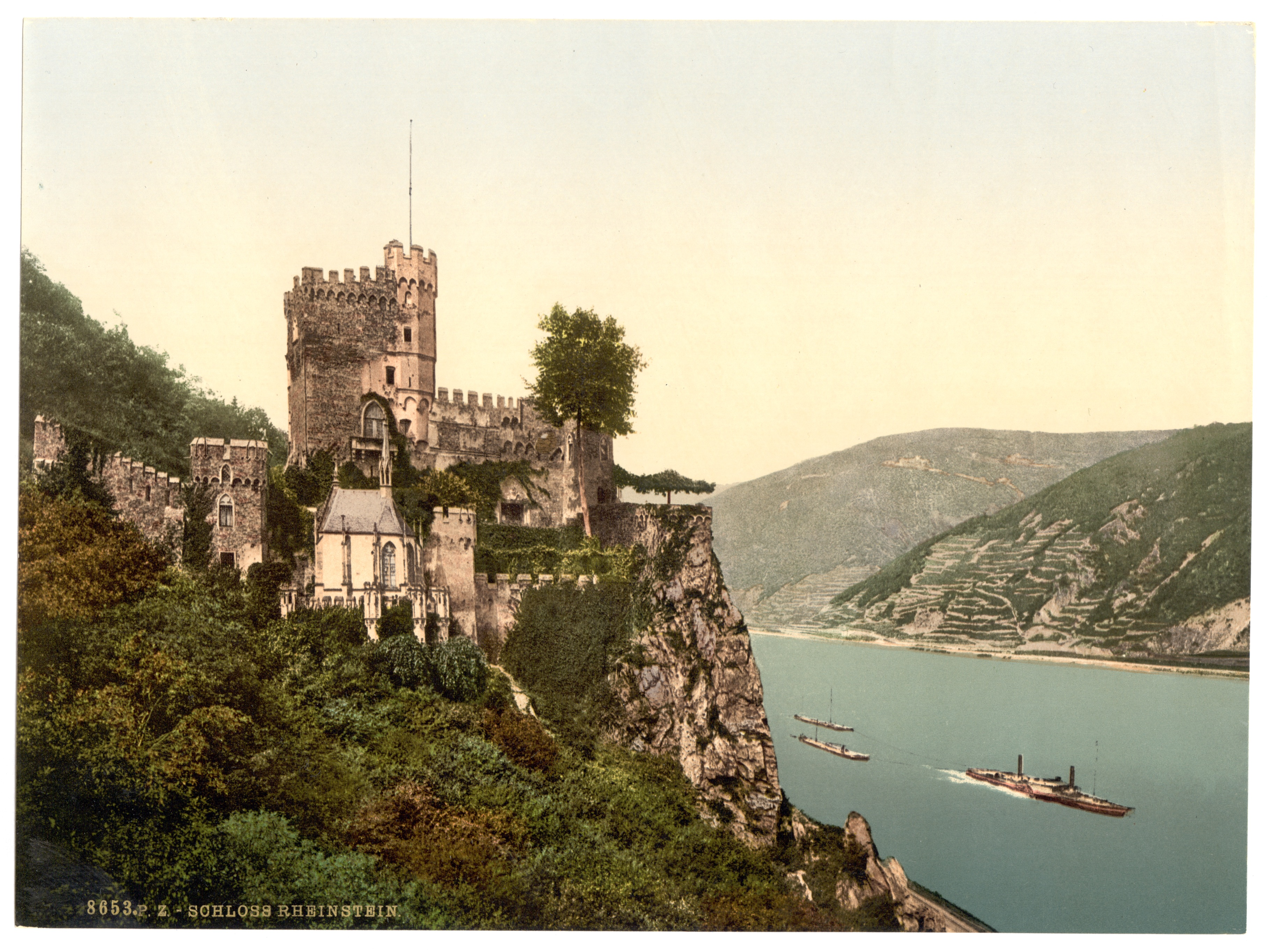
The castle in the last decade of the 19th century

Rheinstein Castle (German: Burg Rheinstein) is a castle near the town of Trechtingshausen in Rhineland-Palatinate, Germany.

== History ==
The castle was constructed in about 1316/1317. Rheinstein Castle was important for its strategic location. By 1344, the castle was in decline. By the time of the Palatine War of Succession, the castle was very dilapidated. During the romantic period in the 19th century, Prince Frederick of Prussia (1794–1863) bought the castle and it was rebuilt.

== Description ==
Burg Rheinstein possesses a working drawbridge and portcullis, which are typical of medieval castle architecture and defences. The castle is open to the public. Just past the gift shop near the entrance is an opening on the left to the courtyard, which has views of the Rhine. Rheinstein's courtyard is known as the Burgundy Garden after the Burgundy grape vine growing there. The vine, which is approximately 500 years old, still produces grapes.

From the garden, steps lead down to the castle chapel. In the centre of the Gothic altar piece of the chapel there is a woodcarving depicting Jesus at the Last Supper. Between the rock and chapel, additional steps lead down to the royal crypt of Prince Frederick William Louis's family.

Heading upwards to the Burgundy Garden, another set of steps lead to the main part of the castle. The largest and most impressive room at Rheinstein Castle is located at the top of the stairway to the left once inside the castle. Known as the Rittersaal or Knight's Hall, it includes beautiful stained glass windows, as well as three-dimensional paintings. Rheinstein houses a cafe and gift shop offering miniature handmade wooden treasure chests, as well as traditional items including postcards and guidebooks for purchase.

== Chronology ==
From the 14th–17th centuries, the castle was granted as a fief by the archbishops of Mainz. Its owners and feudal lords included:

1323 – Matthias, Count of Bucheck, Archbishop of Mainz

1348 – Kuno II von Falkenstein, Archbishop of Mainz

1409 – John of Nassau enfeoffed the Geheimrat, Johann von Selheim, with Königstein. Sometimes the archbishops of Mainz stayed here in their secular role as electors of the Holy Roman Empire.

1459 – Diether von Isenburg, Elector and Archbishop of Mainz, enfeoffed the castle and the village of Assmannshausen (which is near the castle on the opposite bank of Rhine) to the cathedral student (Domscholasten) Volpert.

1572 – The castle, together with its associated estate, was transferred to Mainz cathedral's custodian (Domkustos) and chamberlain, Anton Wiltberg. He could not maintain the castle economically, however. It gradually decayed, but remained Wiltberg's residence until his death.

1779 – the ruins were given a new owner: Geheimrat J.von Eys. He alienated the buildings for four Laubtalers to the Regierungsrat Johann Jacob, Lord of Goll.

1823 – On 31 March 1823, Prince Frederick of Prussia bought the castle ruins and the rocks. The prince was a nephew of King Frederick William III of Prussia and Queen Luise.

1825–1829 – saw its rebuilding under the leadership of the famous castle builder, Claudius Lassaulx, who was succeeded in 1827 by his pupil, Wilhelm Kuhn, who completed the building. Prince Frederick named the castle "Rheinstein" because of its impressive cliffs directly above the river.

1842 – Rheinstein Castle became the favorite residence of Prince Frederick. Many crowned heads of state of that time were guests at the castle, such as Queen Victoria, Empress Alexandra Feodorovna of Russia and many others. Prince Frederick had the Wiesbaden architect, Ph. Hoffmann, draw up a plan for a chapel and crypt. Just two years later, the neo-Gothic chapel and crypt for the royal family was formally opened.

1863 – After the death of the prince his son, Prince George of Prussia, inherited Rheinstein.

1902 – Prince Henry of Prussia, a brother of Kaiser William II, now inherits the castle.

1925 – the AV Rheinstein zu Köln im CV, a German student fraternity is founded and named after Rheinstein Castle. The castle is visited by the fraternity on a yearly basis.

1929 – the wife of Prince Henry, Irene of Hesse and by Rhine becomes the owner.

1953 – The last owner of the German nobility is the Princess Barbara of Prussia, the Duchess of Mecklenburg.

1975 – the castle is in private possession of the Hecher family

In the 1980s, the castle was handed down to the Rhine Family, but they donated it to the government to be used as a museum.

== Notes and references ==
- Joachim Glatz: Trechtingshausen. Burg Rheinstein. 4. Auflage. Schnell & Steiner, Regensburg 2013. (Kleine Kunstführer Nr. 2538.)
- Ulrike Glatz, Joachim Glatz: Burg Rheinstein bei Trechtingshausen. Schnell & Steiner, Regensburg 2012. (Wartburg-Gesellschaft (Hg.): Burgen, Schlösser und Wehrbauten in Mitteleuropa, Bd. 27.)

== Sources and external links ==
- http://www.burg-rheinstein.de
- de:Burg Rheinstein
- Aerial views of Rheinstein Castle
- Interview with Markus Hecher, the owner of Rheinstein Castle
