= Order of Louise =

Prussian chivalric order for women

Order of Louise Luisen-Orden
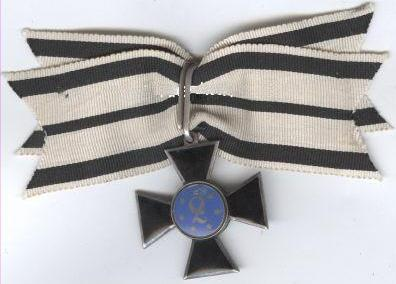
- Insignia of the Order (1st Class)

Awarded by Head of the House of Prussia
- Type: State Order (formerly); House Order (currently)
- Established: 3 August 1814
- Royal house: House of Prussia
- Ribbon: White with black stripes
- Sovereign: Georg Friedrich, Prince of Prussia
- Grand Mistress: Sophie, Princess of Prussia
- Grades: Dame, Special Class; Dame, 1st Class; Dame, 2nd Class

Precedence
- Next (higher): Order of Saint John
- Next (lower): Wilhelm-Orden
- Ribbons of the order

The Order of Louise (German: Luisen-Orden) was founded on 3 August 1814 by Frederick William III of Prussia to honor his late wife, the much beloved Queen Louise (née Luise Auguste Wilhelmine Amalie, Herzogin zu Mecklenburg-Strelitz). This order was chivalric in nature, but was intended strictly for women whose service to Prussia was worthy of such high national recognition. Its dame companion members were limited to 100 in number, and were intended to be drawn from all classes.

Though the Prussian king was technically the "Sovereign of the Orders" of the realm, the Chief of the Order of Louise was the reigning queen. Daughters in the royal family were invested with this order in lieu of the Order of the Black Eagle, Order of the Red Eagle Grand Cross, Prussian Crown Order First Class, and Royal House Order of Hohenzollern that were reserved for the sons.

The Order of Louise was renewed with each successive monarch. It was issued from its founding in 1814 (during the reign of Friedrich Wilhelm III) and renewed in 1850 (during the reign of Friedrich Wilhelm IV), in 1865 (during the reign of Wilhelm I), and in 1890 (during the reign of Wilhelm II).

== Original statutes ==
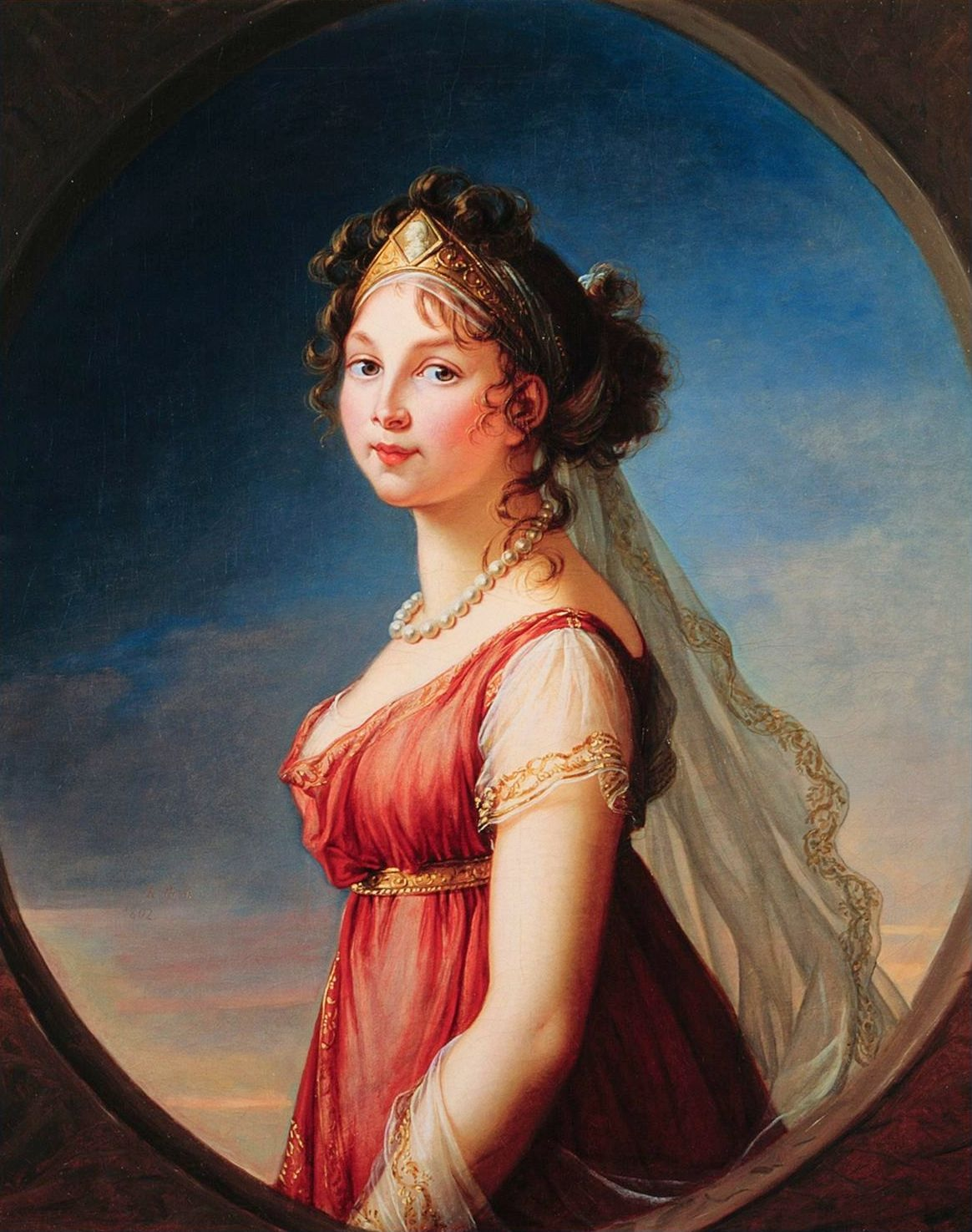
Queen Louise of Prussia, for whom the Order of Louise was named. Portrait of Louise of Mecklenburg-Strelitz by Elizabeth Vigee-LeBrun, 1802

The text of the original royal proclamation that created the Order roughly translates as follows:

When the men of our brave armies bled for the homeland, you found relief in the maintaining care of the women. Faith and hope gave the mothers and daughters of the country the power… for the grand purpose (of the nation). It is impossible to honor or (decorate them enough) for what they have accomplished; but We find it justified to lend them an honor, whose (contributions) are especially acknowledged. We decree therefore hereby following:

1. The honor shall bear the meaningful name:

L u i s e n - O r d e n

Establish that we with this, a small, black-enameled golden cross. The (center medallion) on both sides will be of sky blue enamel; with the letter “L” (on the obverse), surrounded by a wreath of (seven) stars; and on the (reverse) the year “1813/1814”.

2. This order is worn (suspended from) a bow of the white ribbon of the Iron Cross (and shall be worn) on the left breast.

3. The award (will be bestowed) without consideration of social position or rank; however only such persons can receive it, are, who belong to the homeland through birth or marriage, or otherwise nationalized (citizens).

4. The number (of members) is restricted to one hundred.

5. To its selection let's decree hereby a Capitel, which, under the chair of the woman princess Wilhelm Königl. Highness, out of four women …

6. The Capitel will consider candidates, of the feminine sex, from all provinces of the nation, carefully test their credentials, out of which they will decide the worthiest, select up to the available / vacant number (of memberships) and indicate them to Us (the king and emperor) confirmation being specifically reserved for Us. The bestowal / conferral of the award results then, after Our confirmation, under the signature of the Princess Wilhelm Königl. Highness.

7. We hereby order the management of the membership to the (wife of) field marshal count v. d. Gröben.

8. Regarding the loss of the order: We will decide, after considering the expert opinions of the Capitels Allerhöchstselbst, if removal / expulsion should occur, … given general directions, the loss of the order and medal will follow.

== Classes of membership and insignia ==
At its initial creation in 1814, the Order was only available in one class. A second class was added during the reign of Wilhelm I.

Dames, First Class, wore the black-enameled cross with its blue-enameled, medallion centerpiece, suspended from a predominantly white ribbon, with three black stripes, as tied in a bow. Though the statutes indicate that the badge was to be worn on the left breast, many period portraits show the members wearing the badge on or at the left shoulder of their dresses.

Dames, Second Class, wore a similarly-designed silver cross, minus the black enamel, which was also worn suspended from the white and black bow. The Prussian State Handbook of 1907 indicates further variants and subsets of the Second Class of the order: II.1 with silver crown, II.1 (without crown), and II.2.

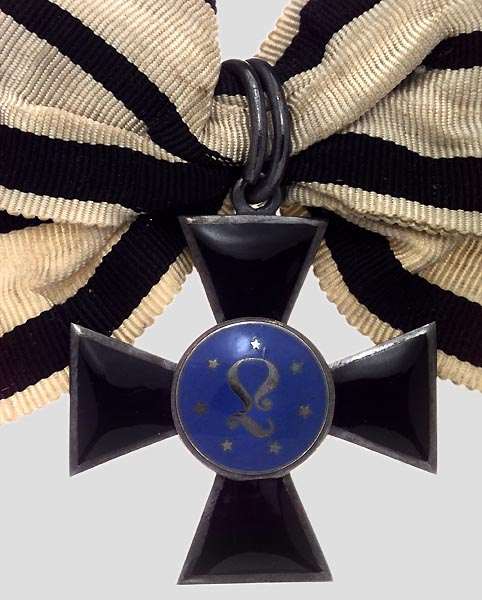
Badge of the Order of Louise, First Class

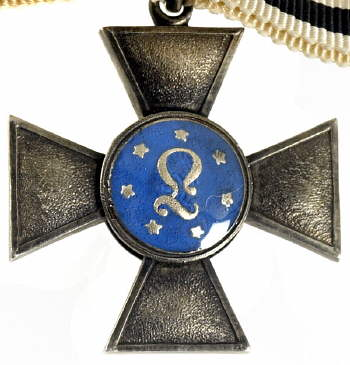
Badge of the Order of Louise, Second Class

== Recipients ==
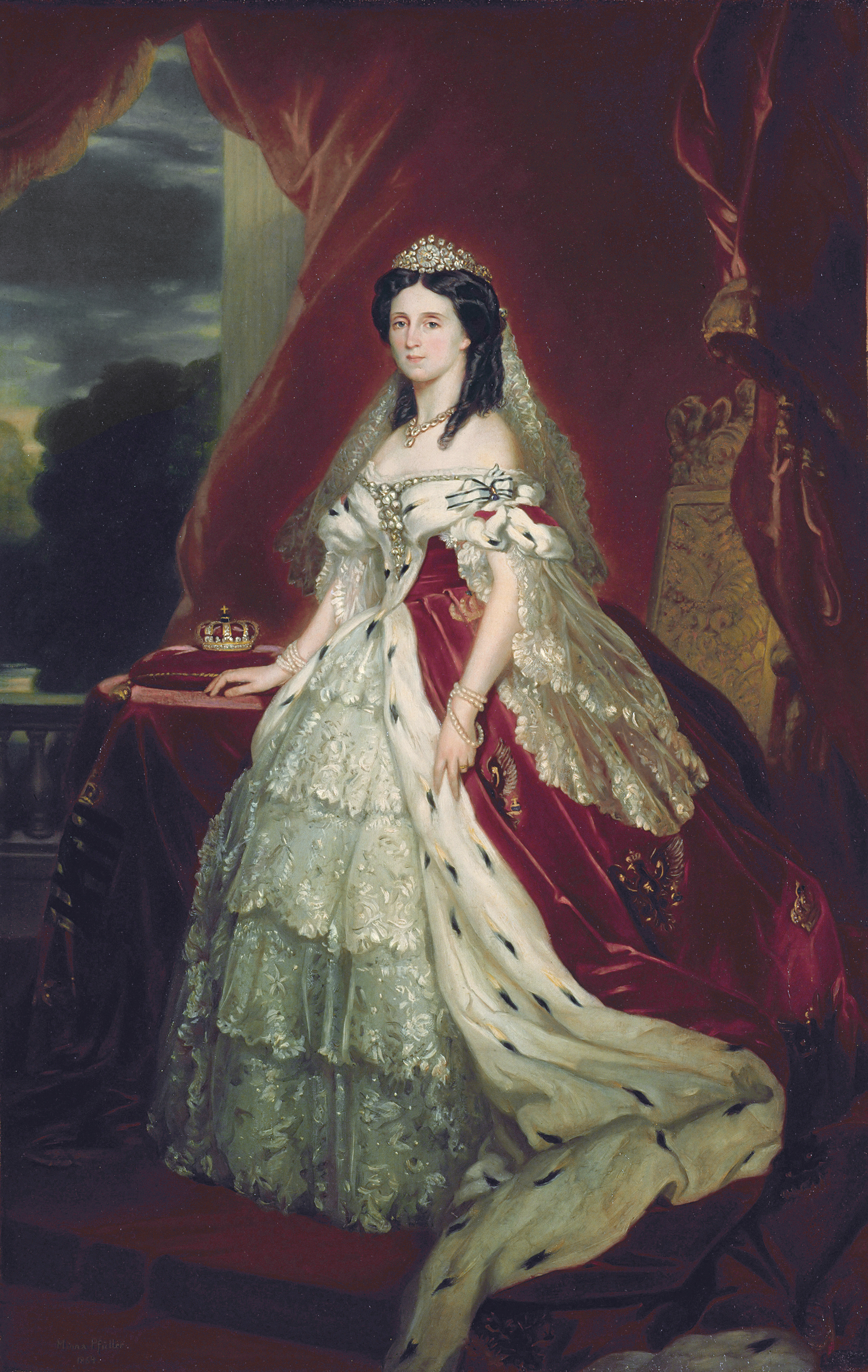
Kaiserin Augusta, wearing the Prussian state regalia, and the Order of Louise (on her left shoulder). Portrait by Franz Xavier Winterhalter, ca. 1861

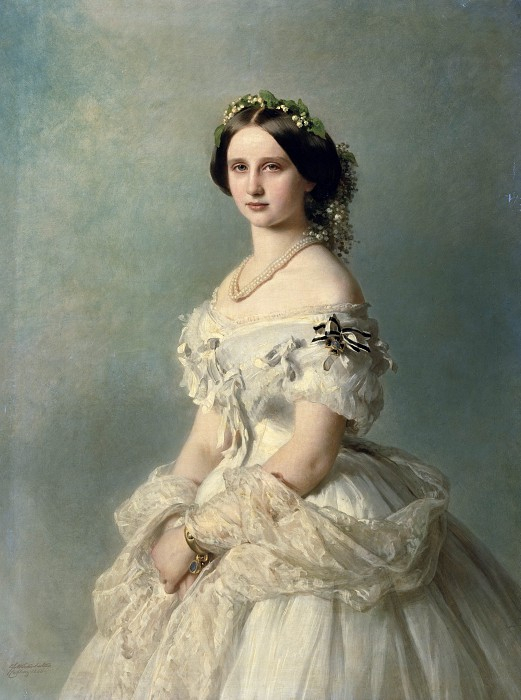
Luise, Prinzessin von Preußen, Grand Duchess of Baden, wearing the Order of Louise. Portrait by Franz Xavier Winterhalter, ca. 1856

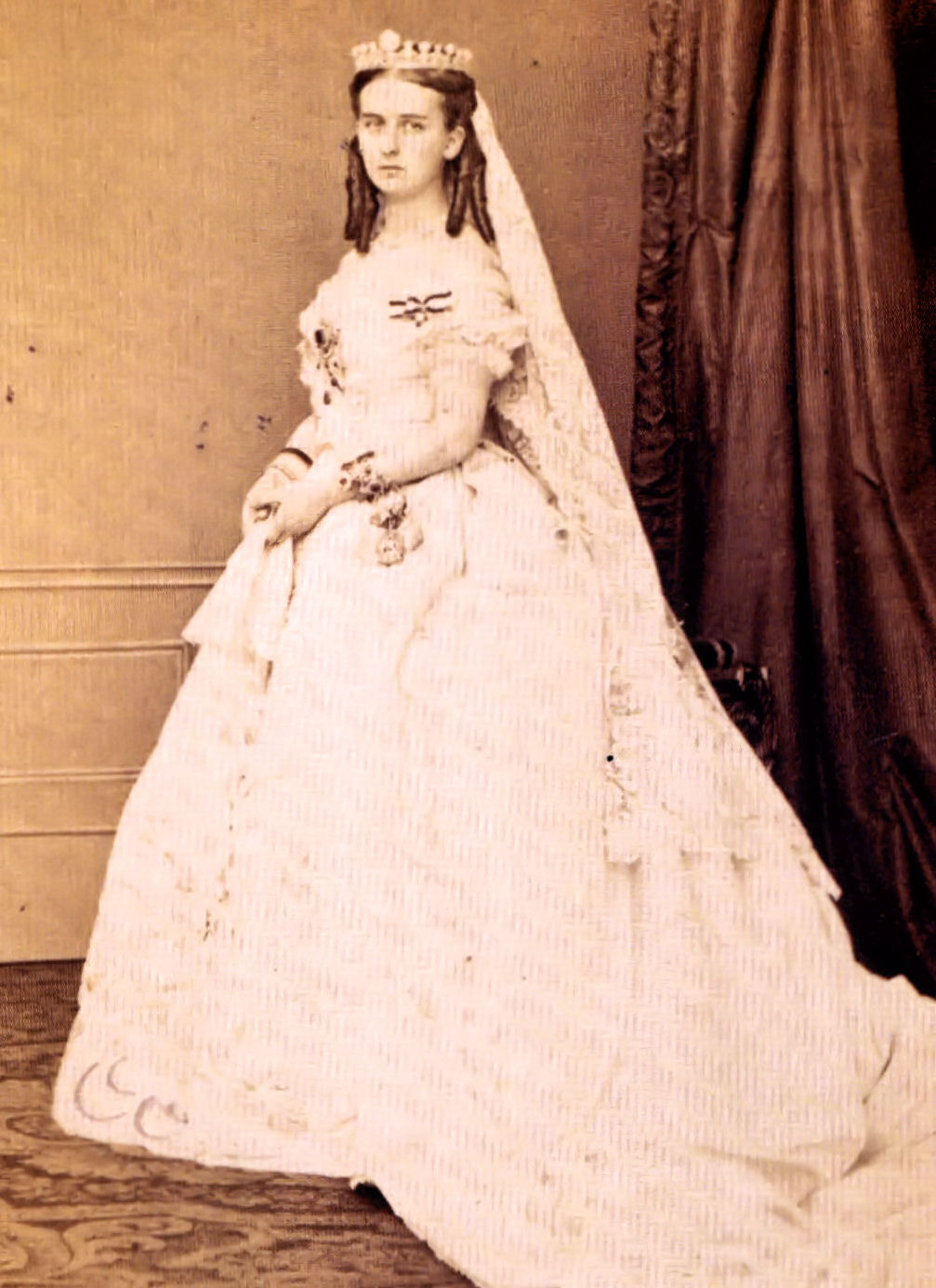
Maria, Prinzessin von Hohenzollern-Sigmaringen, Duchess of Flanders, wearing the Order of Louise

- Grand Duchess Alexandra Nikolaevna of Russia
- Alexandra of Denmark
- Princess Alexandra of Hanover (born 1882)
- Princess Alexandrine of Baden
- Alexandrine of Mecklenburg-Schwerin
- Princess Alexandrine of Prussia (1842–1906)
- Princess Alexandrine of Prussia (1803–1892)
- Princess Alexandrine of Prussia (1915–1980)
- Princess Alice of the United Kingdom
- Amalie Auguste of Bavaria
- Amélie of Leuchtenberg
- Grand Duchess Anastasia Mikhailovna of Russia
- Princess Anna of Prussia
- Infanta Antónia of Portugal
- Princess Irene, Duchess of Aosta
- Princess Louise, Duchess of Argyll
- Augusta of Saxe-Weimar-Eisenach
- Augusta Victoria of Schleswig-Holstein
- Princess Caroline Reuss of Greiz
- Duchess Cecilie of Mecklenburg-Schwerin
- Alexandra Feodorovna (Alix of Hesse)
- Alexandra Feodorovna (Charlotte of Prussia)
- Princess Charlotte of Prussia
- Elisabeth Ludovika of Bavaria
- Elisabeth of Wied
- Princess Elisabeth of Prussia
- Emma of Waldeck and Pyrmont
- Princess Feodora of Saxe-Meiningen
- Frederica of Hanover
- Frederica of Mecklenburg-Strelitz
- Princess Frederica of Prussia (1796–1850)
- Princess Helena of the United Kingdom
- Hermine Reuss of Greiz
- Countess Hedwig von Rittberg
- Countess Ina Marie von Bassewitz
- Princess Irene of Hesse and by Rhine
- Princess Joséphine Caroline of Belgium
- Princess Josephine of Baden
- Juliana of the Netherlands
- Princess Katherine of Greece and Denmark
- Grand Duchess Kira Kirillovna of Russia
- Princess Kira of Prussia
- Princess Louise Margaret of Prussia
- Princess Louise of Prussia
- Louise of Sweden
- Louise of the Netherlands
- Princess Louise Sophie of Schleswig-Holstein-Sonderburg-Augustenburg
- Princess Ludovika of Bavaria
- Princess Luise of Anhalt-Bernburg
- Princess Magdalena Reuss of Köstritz
- Princess Margaret of Prussia
- Princess Maria Anna of Anhalt-Dessau
- Maria Anna of Bavaria (born 1805)
- Grand Duchess Maria Nikolaevna of Russia (1819–1876)
- Princess Maria Teresa of Bourbon-Two Sicilies (1867–1909)
- Princess Marianne of the Netherlands
- Duchess Marie Louise of Mecklenburg-Schwerin
- Duchess Marie of Mecklenburg-Schwerin
- Marie of Prussia
- Princess Marie Alexandrine of Saxe-Weimar-Eisenach
- Princess Marie of Saxe-Weimar-Eisenach (1808–1877)
- Mary of Teck
- Princess Pauline of Waldeck and Pyrmont
- Princess Elisabeth of Saxe-Altenburg (1826–1896)
- Princess Friederike of Schleswig-Holstein-Sonderburg-Glücksburg
- Empress Shoken
- Princess Sophie of Bavaria
- Princess Sophie of Sweden
- Princess Sophie of the Netherlands
- Princess Victoria Louise of Prussia
- Princess Victoria Margaret of Prussia
- Princess Victoria Melita of Saxe-Coburg and Gotha
- Victoria, Princess Royal
- Queen Victoria
- Princess Viktoria of Prussia
- Princess Antonia, Duchess of Wellington
- Wilhelmina of the Netherlands
- Princess Wilhelmine, Duchess of Sagan

== Sources ==
- Gottschalck, Friedrich. Almanach der Ritter-Orden. Leipzig, (Kingdom of) Saxony: Georg Joachim Goeschen, 1819.
- Handbuch über den Königlich Preußischen Hof und Staat für das Jahr 1874. Berlin: Kingdom of Prussia, 1873.
- Handbuch über den Königlich Preußischen Hof und Staat für das Jahr 1883. Berlin: Kingdom of Prussia, 1882.
- Handbuch über den Königlich Preußischen Hof und Staat für das Jahr 1907. Berlin: Kingdom of Prussia, 1906.
