= Heinrich XXXIII, Prince Reuss of Köstritz =

Prince Heinrich XXXIII Reuss of Köstritz
- Lord of Trebschen
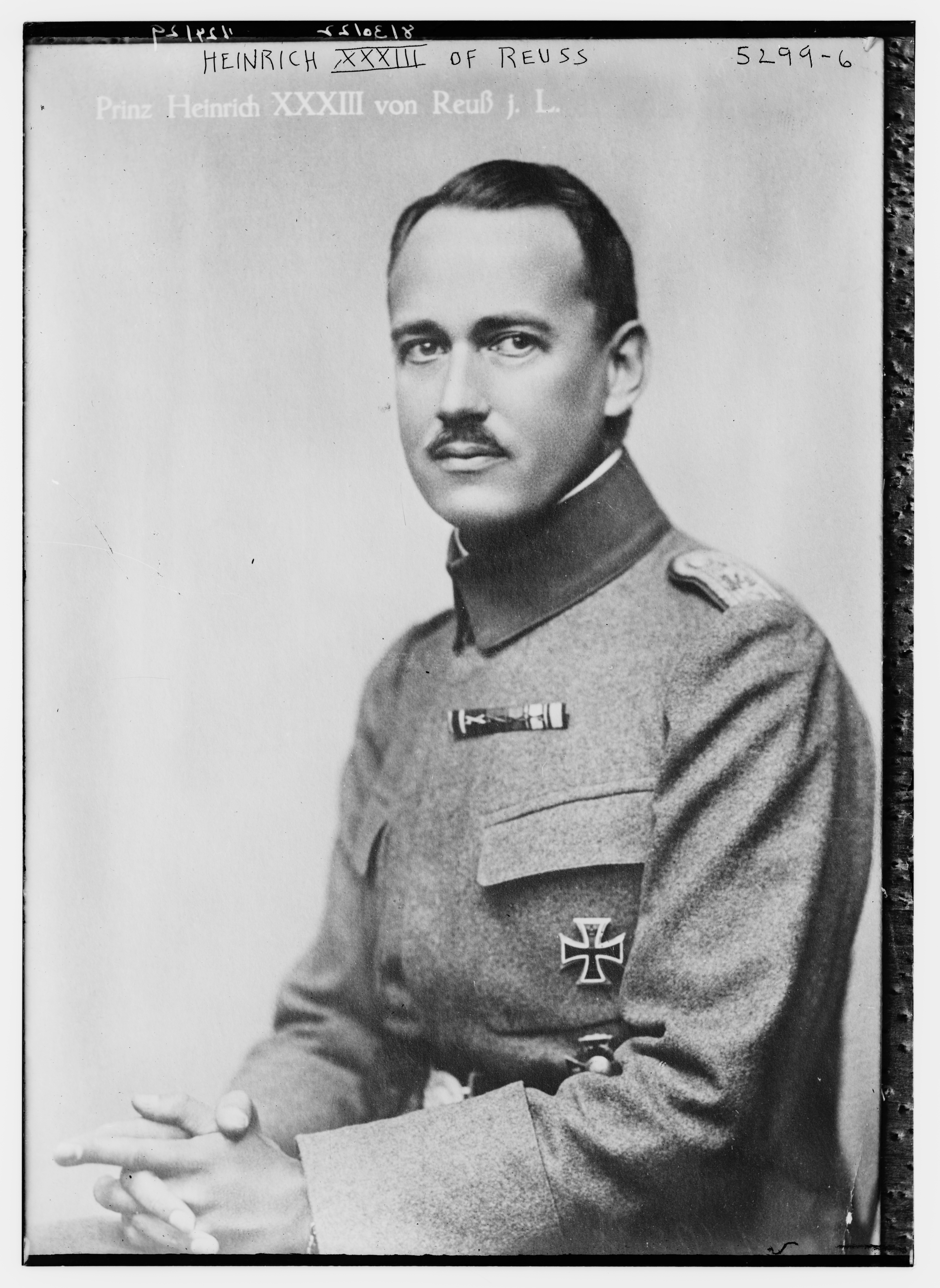
- Heinrich in 1900
- Born: 26 July 1879; Mauer
- Died: 15 November 1942 (aged 63); Stonsdorf, Germany
- Spouse: Princess Victoria Margaret of Prussia (m. 1913; div. 1922) Allene Tew (m. 1929; div. 1935)
- Issue: Princess Marie Luise Reuss zu Köstritz; Prince Heinrich II Reuss zu Köstritz
Names
- German: Heinrich XXXIII Prinz Reuss zu Köstritz
- House: House of Reuss
- Father: Heinrich VII, Prince Reuss of Köstritz
- Mother: Princess Marie Alexandrine of Saxe-Weimar-Eisenach

Prince Heinrich XXXIII Reuss of Köstritz (26 July 1879 – 15 November 1942) was a German aristocrat.

== Early life ==
Prince Heinrich XXXIII Reuss was the younger son of the Prince Heinrich VII Reuss of Köstritz and Princess Marie Alexandrine of Saxe-Weimar-Eisenach. Through his mother, Prince Heinrich XXXIII was heir to the throne of the Kingdom of the Netherlands until the birth of the Crown Princess Juliana, daughter of Queen Wilhelmina. His elder brother was Heinrich XXXII, Prince Reuss of Köstritz.

Prince Reuss was trained as a doctor, and passed all his medical examinations; he entered the army subsequently and took a commission in the 2nd Dragoon Guards, and afterwards served in the German diplomatic service. It was Prince Reuss before whom the two English doctors, Dr. Elliot and Dr. Austin, who were arrested as spies in Belgium were tried. The question to be decided by the Prince was whether they were doctors or not, and he had to put them through a severe examination in medicine. They were acquitted, and the Prince reportedly said "he thought those two English doctors two of the finest and most honest men he had ever met."

== Dutch succession ==
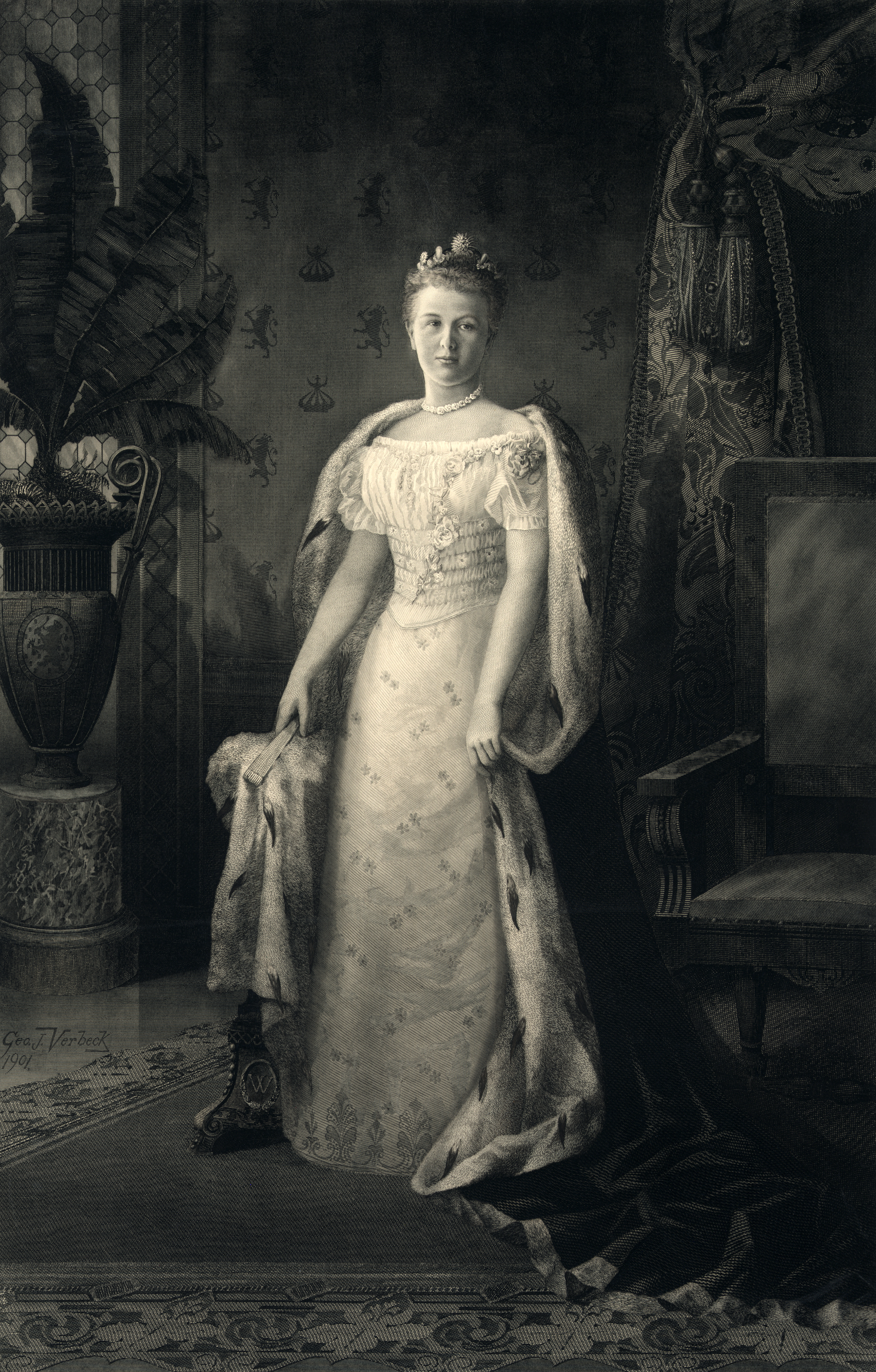
Queen Wilhelmina in 1898.

Prince Heinrich XXXIII Reuss was seen as the most probable heir to the Dutch throne in the event that Queen Wilhelmina remained childless. Thus until 1909 he could be considered as an heir although he had severe competition from the Wied family (Princess Marie zu Wied was a daughter of Prince Frederick of the Netherlands and very popular in the Netherlands). Prince Heinrich XXXIII was the younger son of Marie Alexandrine (daughter of Princess Sophie of the Netherlands) and Prince Heinrich VII Reuss of Köstritz.

A contemporary report said: "Prince Henry XXXII of Reuss, who is next in order to the Grand Duke of Saxe-Weimar, is said to have no ambition in the direction of the Dutch throne, and to be willing to "renounce" in favour of Prince Henry XXXIII, now employed at the Berlin foreign Office, and until a year ago a member of the German Embassy in Paris. Early last year Prince Henry XXXIII was the guest of the Queen at The Hague, and was made much of at the Court and in social circles, so that he came to be generally regarded as "first favourite" in the succession. He is a man of varied talents; as a sculptor and as a painter he has produced ivories which have been accorded favourable criticism."

== Marriage ==
His first marriage was to Princess Victoria Margaret of Prussia, daughter of Prince Friedrich Leopold of Prussia and Princess Louise Sophie of Schleswig-Holstein-Sonderburg-Augustenburg, on 17 May 1913 at Neues Palais, Potsdam, Brandenburg, Germany. Before they were divorced on 14 July 1922, they were the parents of two children, a daughter and a son:

- Princess Maria Luise (1915–1985), who married Erich Theisen in 1941. They divorced in 1946 and she married Dr. Alexander Bodey in 1954. They divorced in 1956.
- Prince Heinrich II (1916–1993), who died unmarried in Menton.

Princess Victoria Margaret died the following year of complications of influenza. She was buried at Glienicke Palace.

On 10 April 1929, he married the wealthy American Allene Tew in Paris, France. She was a widow of Anson Wood Burchard (vice-chairman of General Electric). They were divorced on 31 October 1935. Her divorce from the prince was said to have been caused by his espousal of the Nazi cause. Allene became the guardian of his young son and brought him to America with her and her new husband, Count Paul de Kotzebue, shortly after their marriage in 1936.

The Prince died on 15 November 1942 at age 63 at Stonsdorf.

== Ancestry ==
Ancestors of Heinrich XXXIII, Prince Reuss of Köstritz

8. Prince Heinrich XLIV Reuss of Köstritz
4. Heinrich LXIII, Prince Reuss of Köstritz
9. Baroness Wilhelmine von Geuder genannt Rabensteiner
2. Heinrich VII, Prince Reuss of Köstritz
10. Count Henry of Stolberg-Wernigerode
5. Countess Eleonore of Stolberg-Wernigerode
11. Princess Jenny of Schönburg-Waldenburg
1. Prince Heinrich XXXIII Reuss of Köstritz
12. Charles Frederick, Grand Duke of Saxe-Weimar-Eisenach
6. Charles Alexander, Grand Duke of Saxe-Weimar-Eisenach
13. Grand Duchess Maria Pavlovna of Russia
3. Princess Marie of Saxe-Weimar-Eisenach
14. William II of the Netherlands
7. Princess Sophie of the Netherlands
15. Grand Duchess Anna Pavlovna of Russia
