= Princess Victoria Margaret of Prussia =

Victoria Margaret of Prussia
- Princess Heinrich XXXIII Reuss of Köstritz
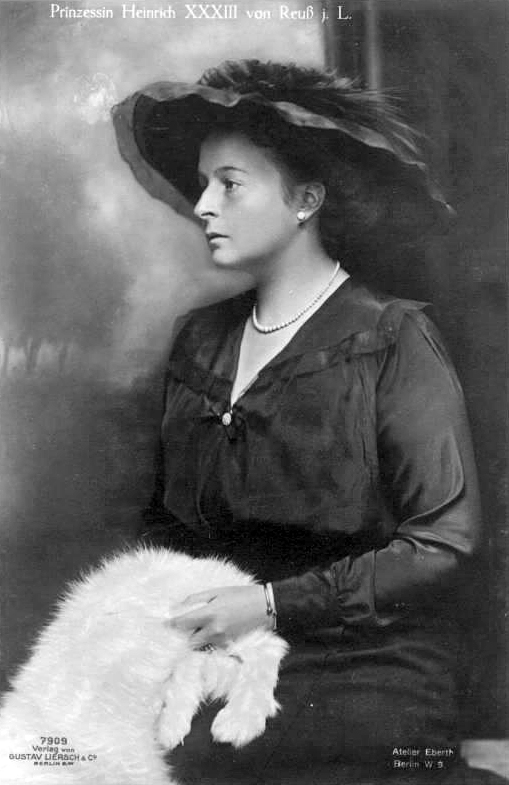
- Photograph, circa 1919.
- Born: 17 April 1890; Potsdam, Prussia
- Died: 9 September 1923 (aged 33); Klein Glienicke, Free State of Prussia
- Burial: Glienicke Palace
- Spouse: Prince Heinrich XXXIII Reuss of Köstritz (m. 1913; div. 1922)
- Issue: Princess Marie Luise Reuss of Köstritz; Prince Heinrich II Reuss of Köstritz
Names
- German: Viktoria Margarete Elisabeth Marie Ulrike
- House: Hohenzollern
- Father: Prince Friedrich Leopold of Prussia
- Mother: Princess Louise Sophie of Schleswig-Holstein-Sonderburg-Augustenburg

Princess Victoria Margaret of Prussia (17 April 1890 – 9 September 1923) was a member of the House of Hohenzollern by birth and by marriage was a member of the House of Reuss.

== Biography ==
=== Family and lineage ===
Victoria's paternal grandparents were Prince Friedrich Karl of Prussia and Princess Maria Anna of Anhalt-Dessau. Her maternal grandparents were Frederick VIII, Duke of Schleswig-Holstein and Princess Adelheid of Hohenlohe-Langenburg.

Victoria had three siblings: Prince Friedrich Sigismund of Prussia, Prince Friedrich Karl of Prussia, and Prince Friedrich Leopold of Prussia. Through her mother and father, Victoria was a niece of the Duchess of Connaught and Strathern and Empress Augusta Victoria, wife of Wilhelm II, German Emperor.

=== Marriage ===
On 17 May 1913, she married Prince Heinrich XXXIII Reuss of Köstritz, son of Heinrich VII, Prince Reuss of Köstritz and Princess Marie of Saxe-Weimar and Eisenach. By birth, he was member of the House of Reuss, one of the oldest reigning houses in Europe. He was a grandson of Charles Alexander, Grand Duke of Saxe-Weimar-Eisenach and his wife, Princess Sophie of the Netherlands. Earlier, in April 1909, a rumored engagement between Victoria Margaret and Prince Waldemar of Prussia, a nephew of the German Emperor, was reported, but the match never took place. Princess Victoria Margaret was led down the aisle on the arm of her uncle Emperor Wilhelm.

They had two children:

- Princess Marie Luise Reuss of Köstritz (9 January 1915 - 17 June 1985) she married Erich Theisen on 7 June 1941 and they were divorced in 1946. They have one daughter. She remarried Dr. Alexander Bodey on 27 March 1954 and they were divorced on 13 January 1956.
  - Viktoria Sibylle Theisen (31 December 1942) she married Wolfgang Schafer on 22 September 1969. They have three children:
    - Anna Katharina Schafer (5 February 1974)
    - Moritz Fabian Schafer (29 December 1976)
    - Marie Caroline Schafer (17 January 1979)
- Prince Heinrich II Reuss of Köstritz (24 November 1916 - 24 December 1993)

The marriage was dissolved by divorce in 1922.

== Death ==
Princess Victoria Margaret died the following year, on 9 September 1923 at Schloss Klein-Glienicke of complications of influenza. Her body was buried at Glienicke Palace.

After her death, her former husband, Prince Heinrich XXXIII married again to the widowed American Allene Tew Burchard in 1929.

== Ancestry ==
Ancestors of Princess Victoria Margaret of Prussia

8. Prince Charles of Prussia
4. Prince Frederick Charles of Prussia
9. Princess Marie of Saxe-Weimar-Eisenach
2. Prince Friedrich Leopold of Prussia
10. Leopold IV, Duke of Anhalt
5. Princess Maria Anna of Anhalt-Dessau
11. Princess Frederica of Prussia
1. Princess Victoria Margaret of Prussia
12. Christian August II, Duke of Schleswig-Holstein-Sonderburg-Augustenburg
6. Frederick VIII, Duke of Schleswig-Holstein
13. Countess Louise Danneskiold-Samsøe
3. Princess Louise Sophie of Schleswig-Holstein-Sonderburg-Augustenburg
14. Ernst I, Prince of Hohenlohe-Langenburg
7. Princess Adelheid of Hohenlohe-Langenburg
15. Princess Feodora of Leiningen
