= Prince Friedrich Karl of Prussia =

Prince Friedrich Karl of Prussia may refer to:

- Prince Friedrich Karl of Prussia (1828-1885)
- Prince Friedrich Karl of Prussia (1893–1917)
