= Heinrich VII, Prince Reuss of Köstritz =

German diplomat (1825–1906)

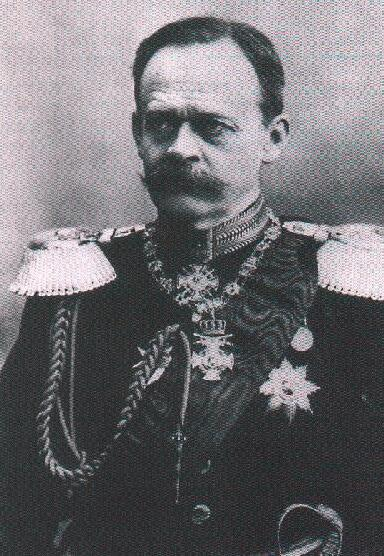
- Born: 14 July 1825; Klipphausen
- Died: 2 May 1906 (aged 80); Trzebiechów
- Spouse: Princess Marie Alexandrine of Saxe-Weimar-Eisenach (m. 1876)
- Issue: Prince Heinrich XXXII; Prince Heinrich XXXIII; Princess Johanna; Sophie Renate, Princess Heinrich XXXIV Reuss of Köstritz; Prince Heinrich XXXV
- House: House of Reuss
- Father: Heinrich LXIII, Prince Reuss of Köstritz
- Mother: Countess Eleonore of Stolberg-Wernigerode

Heinrich VII, Prince Reuss of Köstritz (German: Heinrich VII. Reuß zu Köstritz; 14 July 1825 – 2 May 1906) was a German diplomat.

== Early life ==
Prince Heinrich VII Reuss of Köstritz was born at Klipphausen on 14 July 1825. He was the fifth child and third son of Prince Heinrich LXIII, Prince Reuss of Köstritz and his first wife, Countess Eleonore of Stolberg-Wernigerode (1801–1827).

== Career ==
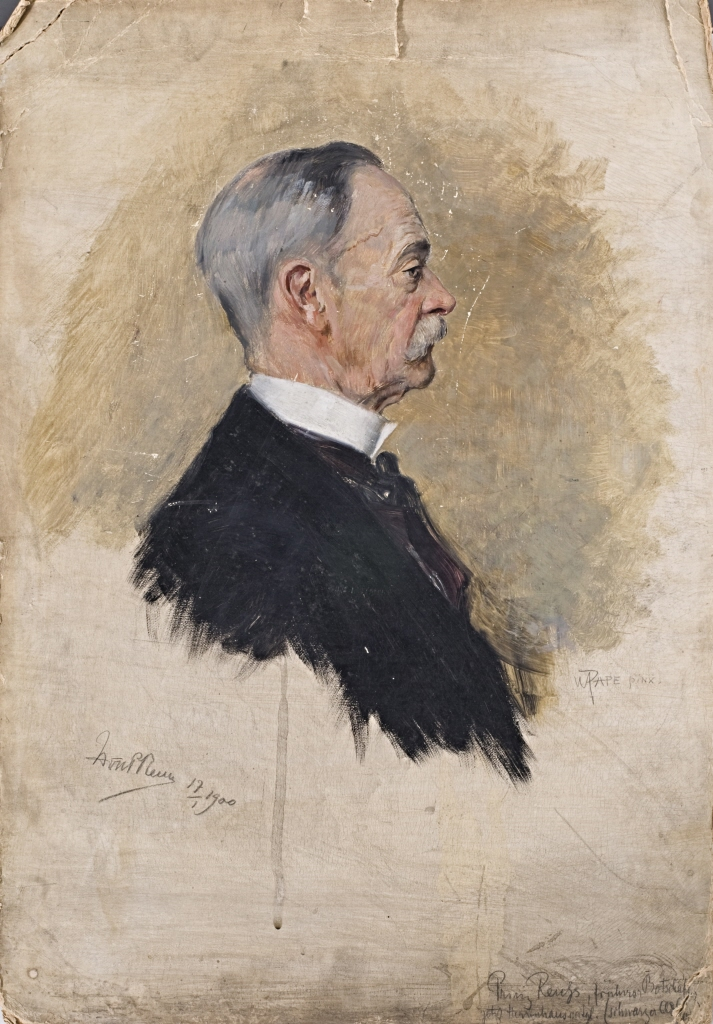
Portrait of Prince Heinrich VII Reuss of Köstritz, by William Pape, 1900

From 1845 to 1848 he studied law at Ruprecht Karls University of Heidelberg and Humboldt University of Berlin. He then joined the 8th Lancers Regiment. From 1853, he pursued a diplomatic career.

From 1854 to 1863 he worked as a diplomat (Legationsrat) in the Prussian embassy in Paris. Then he was sent as Prussian royal ambassador to Kassel, and later to Munich. On 5 February 1868 he was posted as envoy extraordinary and minister plenipotentiary of the North German Confederation to the Russian court at St. Petersburg by William I, who was still King of Prussia at that time. On 26 April 1871 he was designated the first ambassador of the German Empire by William, who had been crowned Emperor a few months earlier.

From 1873 to 1876 he served Emperor William I as adjutant general, and was eventually promoted to General of the Cavalry. In 1876 he married Princess Marie Alexandrine of Saxe-Weimar-Eisenach. In that same year, the prince became a member of the Prussian House of Lords. In 1877, he was the first imperial ambassador to Constantinople, where he opened the magnificent Embassy building, which he was allowed to set up to his own taste. Just one year later he went as German ambassador to Vienna; this was his last foreign assignment.

In 1894, he retired to his castle in Trzebiechów (German: Trebschen).

== Family and issue ==
On 6 February 1876, Heinrich VII married Princess Marie Alexandrine of Saxe-Weimar-Eisenach, daughter of Grand Duke Charles Alexander of Saxe-Weimar-Eisenach. From this marriage, he had the following children:

- Unnamed son (1877–1877)
- Heinrich XXXII (1878–1935)

married in 1920 (divorced 1921) Princess Marie Adelaide of Lippe (1895–1993)

- Heinrich XXXIII (1879–1942)

married firstly in 1913 (divorced 1922) Princess Victoria Margaret of Prussia (1890–1923); married secondly in 1929 (divorced 1935) Allene Tew (1876–1955)

  - Princess Maria Luise (1915–1985), who married Erich Theisen in 1941. They divorced in 1946 and she married Dr. Alexander Bodey in 1954. They divorced in 1956.
  - Prince Heinrich II (1916–1993), who died unmarried in Menton.:
- Johanna (1882–1883)
- Sophie Renate (1884–1968)

married in 1909 Prince Heinrich XXXIV Reuss (1887–1956)

- Heinrich XXXV (1887–1936). He married firstly, Princess Marie of Saxe-Altenburg (1888–1947) on 20 April 1911 in Altenburg. They had one daughter before divorcing in 1921. He married secondly in 1921 (divorced 1923) Princess Marie Adelaide of Lippe (1895–1993), they had one son.
  - Marie Helene Reuss of Köstritz (b. 23 February 1912, Silesia - d. 1 August 1933, Korfantow)
  - Prince Heinrich V Reuss of Köstritz (b. 26 May 1921, d. 28 Oct 1980), married morganatically on 22 June 1961 with Ingrid Jobst. They had three children:

Prince Heinrich VII died at Trebschen Castle on 2 May 1906.

== Honours ==
He received the following orders and decorations:

- Principality of Reuss-Gera: Cross of Honour, 1st Class
- Kingdom of Prussia:
  - Knight of Justice of the Johanniter Order, 8 April 1851
  - Commander's Cross of the Royal House Order of Hohenzollern, with Swords, 1866; Grand Commander's Cross with Swords on Ring, 1878; with Star, 11 June 1879
  - Grand Cross of the Red Eagle, with Oak Leaves, 6 February 1876
  - Knight of the Black Eagle, 22 March 1887; with Diamonds, 15 March 1894; with Collar 1889
- Electorate of Hesse: Grand Cross of the Wilhelmsorden, 11 October 1864
- Kingdom of Bavaria: Grand Cross of Merit of the Bavarian Crown, 1867
- French Empire: Commander of the Legion of Honour
- Grand Duchy of Hesse: Grand Cross of the Ludwig Order, 18 May 1893
- Two Sicilies: Commander of the Constantinian Order of St. George
- Schaumburg-Lippe: Cross of Honour of the House Order of Lippe, 1st Class
- Mecklenburg: Grand Cross of the Wendish Crown, with Crown in Ore
- Netherlands: Grand Cross of the Netherlands Lion
- (Austrian Empire) (Kingdom of Hungary) Austria-Hungary: Grand Cross of the Royal Hungarian Order of St. Stephen, 1880; in Diamonds, 1894
- Persian Empire: Order of the August Portrait, in Diamonds
- Russian Empire:
  - Knight of St. Andrew, in Diamonds
  - Knight of St. Vladimir, 2nd Class
- Kingdom of Saxony: Knight of the Rue Crown, 1891
- Saxe-Weimar-Eisenach: Grand Cross of the White Falcon, 1875
- (Saxe-Coburg and Gotha) (Duchy of Saxe-Altenburg) (Saxe-Meiningen) Ernestine duchies: Grand Cross of the Saxe-Ernestine House Order, 1876
- Ottoman Empire: Order of Osmanieh, 1st Class
- Württemberg:
  - Grand Cross of the Württemberg Crown, 1893
  - Grand Cross of the Friedrich Order

== Ancestry ==
Ancestors of Heinrich VII, Prince Reuss of Köstritz

16. Heinrich XXIV, Count Reuss of Köstritz
8. Heinrich IX, Count Reuss of Köstritz
17. Baroness Eleonore of Promnitz-Dittersbach
4. Prince Heinrich XLIV Reuss of Köstritz
18. Count Karl von Wartensleben und Flodroff
9. Countess Amalie von Wartensleben-Flodroff
19. Johanna Margaretha Huyssen van Kattendijke
2. Heinrich LXIII, Prince Reuss of Köstritz
20. Baron Johann von Geuder genannt Rabensteiner
10. Baron Friedrich Christian von Geuder genannt Rabensteiner
22. Baroness Sophia von Lettmath
5. Baroness Wilhelmine von Geuder genannt Rabensteiner
22. Johann von Bredow
11. Johanna von Bredow
23. Sophie von Borcke
1. Heinrich VII, Prince Reuss of Köstritz
24. Count Heinrich Ernst of Stolberg-Wernigerode
12. Count Christian Frederick of Stolberg-Wernigerode
25. Princess Christiane of Anhalt-Köthen
6. Count Heinrich of Stolberg-Wernigerode
26. Christoph Ludwig, Count of Stolberg-Stolberg
13. Countess Auguste of Stolberg-Stolberg
27. Countess Luise of Stolberg-Rossla
3. Countess Eleonore of Stolberg-Wernigerode
28. Count Albrecht of Schönburg-Waldenburg
14. Prince Otto Karl Friedrich of Schonburg-Waldenburg
29. Friederike von der Marwitz
7. Princess Johanna of Schonburg-Waldenburg
30. Count Heinrich XXIII Reuss-Köstritz
15. Countess Henriette Eleonore Elisabeth Reuss-Köstritz
31. Countess Ernestine of Schönburg-Wechselburg

== Literature ==
- Kurt von Priesdorff: Soldatisches Führertum, vol. 9, Hanseatische Verlagsanstalt, Hamburg, 1941
- Heinrich Heffter (1969). "Heinrich VII. Prinz Reuß-Köstritz". Neue Deutsche Biographie (in German). Vol. 8. Berlin: Duncker & Humblot. pp. 387–388.

Preceded by Otto zu Stolberg-Wernigerode	German ambassador in Austria; 1878-1894	Succeeded by Philipp zu Eulenburg
