= Allene Tew =

American socialite (1872–1955)

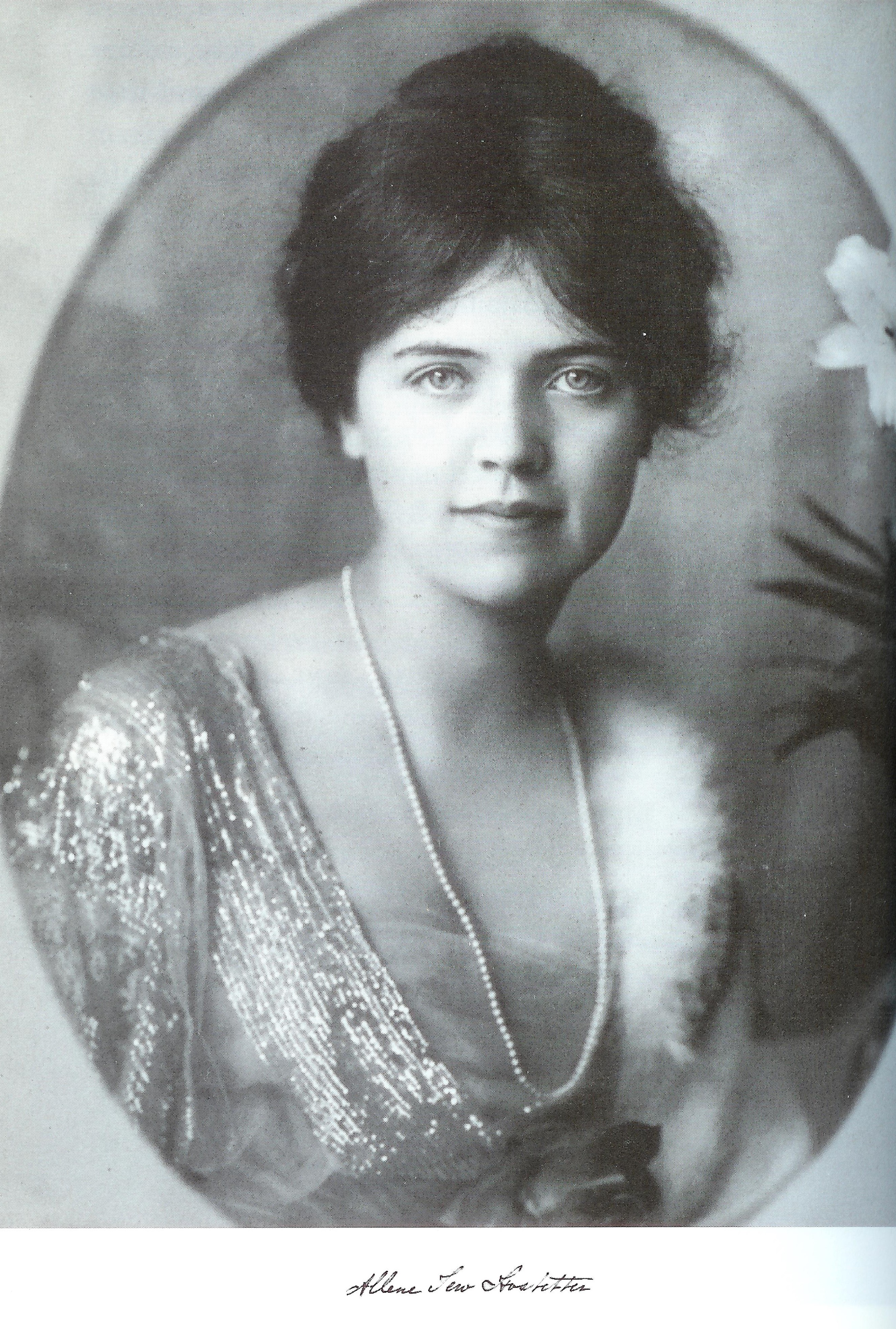
- Born: July 7, 1872; Janesville, Wisconsin, US
- Died: May 1, 1955 (aged 82); Cap d'Ail, France
- Spouses: Theodore R. Hostetter (m. 1891; died 1902); Morton Colton Nichols (m. 1904; div. 1905); Anson Wood Burchard (m. 1912; died 1927); Prince Heinrich XXXIII (m. 1929; div. 1935); Count Pavel de Kotzebue (m. 1936–1955)
- Children: 3

Allene Tew Hostetter Nichols Burchard Reuß zu Köstritz de Kotzebue (July 7, 1872 – May 1, 1955) was an American socialite during the Gilded Age. She was married five times; her last two husbands were European aristocrats.

== Early life ==
Allene Tew was born in Janesville, Wisconsin, on July 7, 1872. Her father, Charles Henry Tew, was a banker in Jamestown, New York, and her mother was Janet (née Smith) Tew.

She was a member of the Daughters of the American Revolution. As such, she had to provide documentation that she was a descendant of someone who fought in the American Revolutionary War. She may have doctored the evidence to encourage Caroline Schermerhorn Astor, the self-proclaimed queen of aristocratic American society at the turn of the century, to accept her as a member of the upper class despite her middle class upbringing, premarital pregnancy, and shotgun wedding.

== Personal life ==
=== First marriage ===
Her first husband was Theodore "Tod" Hostetter (1870–1902), youngest son of David Hostetter, a prominent Pittsburgh businessman and banker, and Rosetta (née Rickey) Hostetter. Tod had inherited part of his late father's considerable fortune and was one of the wealthiest men of Pittsburgh. He was a polo player and yachtsman; also a noted high-stakes gambler. They had a apartment in New York City at 8 East 65th Street, and several country homes, including Raccoon Farm in Beaver County, Pennsylvania, complete with polo grounds and golf links, and a summer house at Narragansett Pier. Tod and Allene had three children:

- Greta Hostetter (1892–1918), who married Glenn L. Stewart (1884–1957). She had her debut at Sherry's in 1911.
- Verna Hostetter (1893–1895), who died in early childhood.
- Theodore Rickey Hostetter Jr. (1897–1918), who was killed in World War I.

Hostetter died of pneumonia on August 3, 1902.His estate was valued at $1.3M. Tod had lost $1,000,000 in the last year, and "[b]efore he was buried the gamblers who claimed that the young man owed them large sums called upon the widow to effect a settlement."

=== Second marriage ===
After Tod's death, Allene settled in New York City.

On December 27, 1904, Allene married Morton Colton Nichols, a real estate investor with Ladd & Nichols They were married at St. Thomas Church by the Rev. Dr. Ernest M. Stires Nichols had previously been rumored to be engaged to Vivien Sartoris, daughter of Nellie Grant and granddaughter of President Ulysses S. Grant. After their honeymoon in Canada, Allene and Morton, lived at 3 East 67th Street while their new residence on Park Avenue and 37th Street was being constructed. They divorced a year later in 1905 and she resumed the name of Hostetter. In August 1932, Nichols hanged himself in a suite at the Pierre Hotel in New York.

=== Third marriage ===
Her third husband was Anson Wood Burchard, whom she married on December 4, 1912, in London. Among those present at the wedding were Burchard's best man, Edwin W. Rice, Lord and Lady Greville (Lady Greville, a fellow American, was the former Olive Grace, widow of Henry Kerr), the Comte de Paris, Mrs. Hinsdill Parsons (Anson's sister and the wife of GE's General Counsel), Capt. and the Hon. Mrs. Feilden, among others. At the time of their wedding, Burchard, a son of Walter Howard Burchard, was assistant to the President of General Electric. He later served as a director and vice-chairman of the company. In Manhattan, they were listed in the Social Register and resided at 57 East 64th Street on the Upper East Side, in a townhouse designed by architect C. P. H. Gilbert. In 1925, they purchased 690 Park Avenue from Mrs. Henry P. Davison. In Paris, they resided at 4 Rue d'Aguesseau in the 8th arrondissement.

During their marriage, both of Allene's children from her first marriage who lived to adulthood died within the same week in 1918. Her husband died suddenly at the home of Mortimer L. Schiff on January 22, 1927. His estate was valued in excess of $3,000,000. Burchard's nephew, Seth Rosewater (son of Charles Rosewater, a part owner of the Omaha Bee), changed his last name "to Burchard in order to keep the Burchard name alive" and to inherit the millions left by his uncle.

=== Fourth marriage ===
In October 1928, Prince Heinrich XXXIII Reuss of Köstritz accompanied her to the Moulton musicale celebrating Arthur J. Moulton's restoration of the historic Chateau de la Verrières in Verrières-le-Buisson, formerly owned by the Comte de Lavalette, Napoleon's aide-de-camp in his Italian campaign. Allene had recently purchased a new house at 33 Rue Barbet de Jouy in France, the former residence of the Comtesse de Montebello. In January 1929, she chartered the Indiana, a luxurious houseboat referred to as a "floating palace", to travel up the Nile River in Egypt. Prince Heinrich, known as Henry in the American press, was among her guests, as was Lord Greville and Lady Greville.

In Paris on April 10, 1929, she married Prince Heinrich as her fourth husband. Capt. Steele, naval attaché of the embassy in Paris, gave the bride in marriage. The guests at the wedding included German Ambassador Prince Heinrich XXXII and Prince Heinrich XXXIV. Her new husband was a member of one of the oldest reigning houses in Europe and a grandson of Charles Alexander, Grand Duke of Saxe-Weimar-Eisenach through his mother Princess Marie. He had been divorced in 1922 from Princess Victoria Margaret of Prussia, niece of German Emperor Wilhelm II. He served as an officer in the Second Dragoons Guard, the regiment of the Empress Alexandra of Russia, and was in the diplomatic service with the German embassy in Paris. During their marriage, she was known for her entertaining, including throwing a debut party at the Waldorf-Astoria for her stepdaughter, Princess Marie Luise Reuss zu Köstritz in 1932.

She became Princess of Reuss, and it was her secretary who announced in June 1935 that the Prince and Princess had divorced.

=== Fifth marriage ===
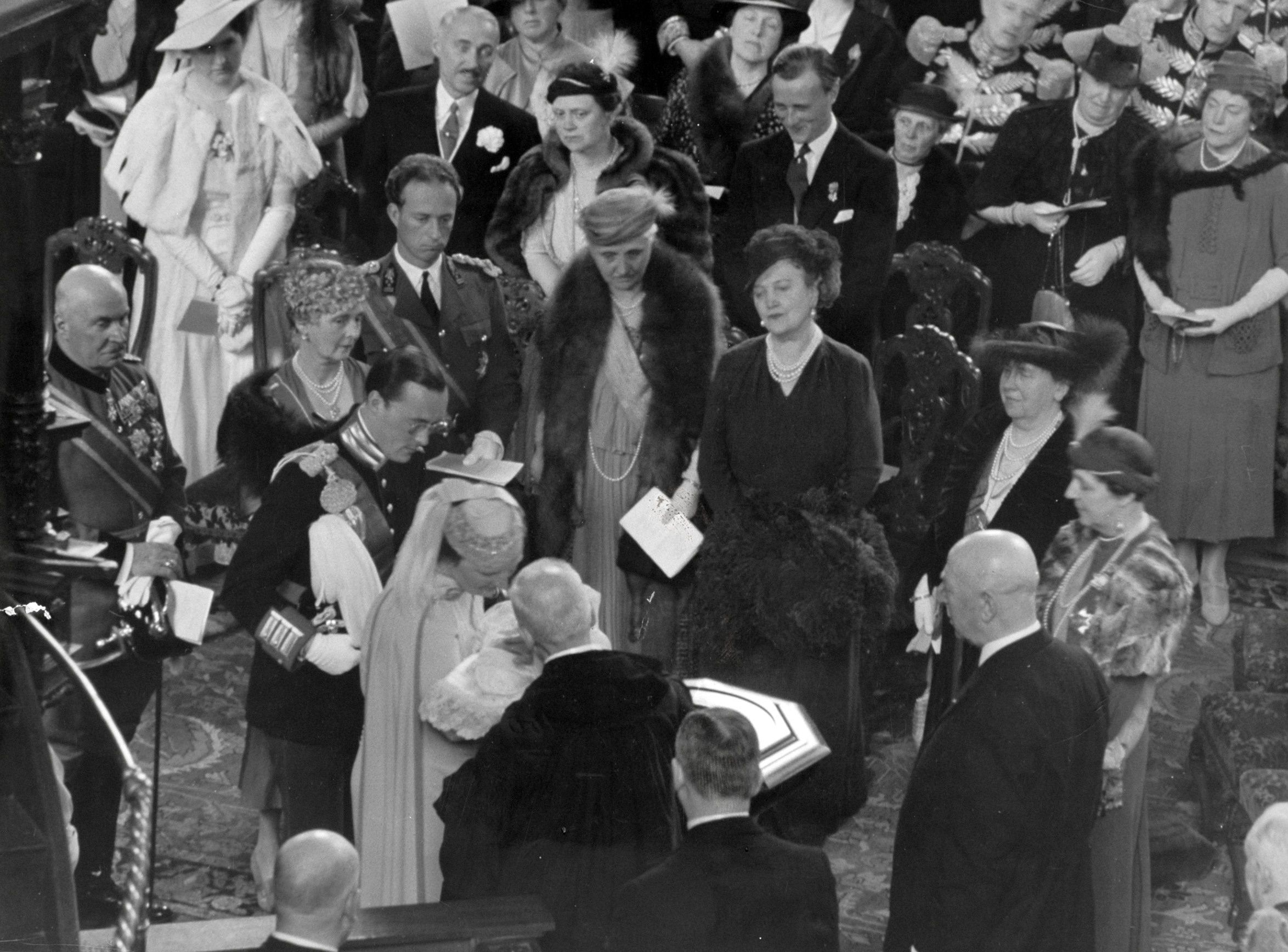
Allene Tew as godmother of the later Queen Beatrix of the Netherlands (1938)

Her fifth husband was Capt. Count Pavel de Kotzebue, who was known as Paul de Kotzebue in the American Press, whom she married on March 4, 1936, in Geneva, Switzerland. He was born on February 20, 1884, in Kremenetz and his uncle, Ernest Karlevich Kotzebue, was the Russian Ambassador to the US from October 31, 1895, to October 28, 1897. It was his first marriage and their guests included Prince Ferdinand of Lippe-Weissenfeld, Prince Lobanoff of Lausanne and Colonel Alexander Kotzebue, the Count's brother. In 1940, they bought Beechwood, the former Newport cottage of Caroline Schermerhorn Astor from Mrs. Astor's grandson, Vincent Astor. They entertained extensively in Newport, including an elaborate garden party for the benefit of the Newport Chapter of the American Red Cross. They lived in New York, Paris, and Palm Beach. (Note: In Palm Beach, Mar-a-Lago was the residence of the second United States Ambassador to the Soviet Union from November 1936 until June 1938 Joseph E. Davies of Watertown, Wisconsin, who was the husband of Marjorie Merriweather Post and later became the United States Ambassador to Belgium and Luxembourg from May 1938 until November 1939. According to the Hermitage Museum Foundation, Post and Davies were Russophiles and had a large private Russian art collection.)

She negotiated on behalf of Prince Bernhard of Lippe-Biesterfeld leading up to his marriage to princess (and subsequently queen) Juliana of the Netherlands because she was a friend of his mother's (Armgard von Cramm). In 1938, she became godmother to their eldest daughter, princess Beatrix, later Queen of the Netherlands.

She died at her villa in Cap d'Ail on the French Riviera on May 1, 1955, at the age of eighty-two. At the time of her death, her New York residence was 740 Park Avenue, considered to be "the most luxurious and powerful residential building in New York City". After her death, six of her cousins filed claims contesting her $20,113,000 will, which reportedly was the largest filed in Newport Probate Court. Count Kotzebue, who had been president of the Russian Nobility Association in America (RNA) from 1942 until 1953, died in Paris on 13 September 1966.
