= Prince Friedrich Leopold of Prussia =

Prince of Prussia (1865–1931)

Friedrich Leopold
- Friedrich Leopold in 1907
- Born: 14 November 1865; Berlin, Kingdom of Prussia
- Died: 13 September 1931 (aged 65); Krojanke, Kreis Flatow, West Prussia, Weimar Republic
- Spouse: Princess Louise Sophie of Schleswig-Holstein-Sonderburg-Augustenburg (m. 1889)
- Issue: Princess Viktoria Margarete; Prince Friedrich Sigismund; Prince Friedrich Karl; Prince Friedrich Leopold
- House: Hohenzollern
- Father: Prince Friedrich Karl of Prussia
- Mother: Princess Maria Anna of Anhalt-Dessau

Prince Friedrich Leopold of Prussia (German: Joachim Karl Wilhelm Friedrich Leopold; 14 November 1865 – 13 September 1931) was the son of Prince Frederick Charles of Prussia and Princess Maria Anna of Anhalt-Dessau.

== Family ==
On 24 June 1889, he married in Berlin Princess Louise Sophie of Schleswig-Holstein-Sonderburg-Augustenburg (8 April 1866 in Kiel – 28 April 1952 in Bad Nauheim), a sister of Empress Auguste Viktoria, wife of Emperor Wilhelm II.

Name	Birth	Death	Notes
Princess Viktoria Margarete Elisabeth Marie Adelheid Ulrike	17 April 1890	9 September 1923	married Prince Heinrich XXXIII Reuss of Köstritz (1879–1942)
Prince Joachim Viktor Wilhelm Leopold Friedrich Sigismund	17 December 1891	6 July 1927	married HSH Princess Marie Luise Dagmar Bathildis Charlotte of Schaumburg-Lippe (10 February 1897-1 October 1938)
Tassilo Wilhelm Humbert Leopold Friedrich Karl	6 April 1893	6 April 1917	known as Prince Friedrich Karl of Prussia, fell in World War I.
Prince Franz Joseph Oskar Ernst Patrick Friedrich Leopold	27 August 1895	27 November 1959	Prisoner in Dachau concentration camp

== Military career ==
At age 10 in 1875 Kadett, in 1885 Premierlieutnant (Oberleutnant), 1888 Rittmeister (Hauptmann), 1890 Major and 1893 Oberst.

In the same year promoted to Generalmajor, commander of the Gardes du Corps, a Cuirassiers regiment of the 1st Guards Cavalry Brigade. Colonel-in-Chief of the Austrian k.u.k. Husarenregimentes Nr. 2 Friedrich Leopold, Prinz von Preußen (since 17. April 1742).

1898 Generalleutnant, leader of Kavallerieinspektion Potsdam. In 1902 General der Kavallerie. Served during Russian-Japanese War (1904–1905) as counselor in the Russian HQ. 1907 Generalinspektor of the Army, 10 September 1910 Generaloberst.

== Other ==
Prinz Friedrich Leopold was the last patron of the Prussian freemasons from the House of Hohenzollern. A member since 1889 in "Friedrich Wilhelm zur Morgenröte", in 1894 he became patron of all three lodges. During the November Revolution 1918, he hoisted a red flag on his hunting lodge, Jagdschloss Glienicke, near Berlin.

He also owned a large manor at Krojanke, after 1918 located in Posen-West Prussia. On 21 June 1924, possession was confirmed by the Reichsgericht. He died there in 1931.

== Honours ==
German honours

- Prussia:
  - Knight of the Black Eagle, 14 November 1875; with Collar, 1884
  - Knight of the Royal Crown Order, 1st Class, 14 November 1875
  - Grand Commander's Cross of the Royal House Order of Hohenzollern, 14 November 1875; with Swords, 1914
  - Grand Cross of the Red Eagle, with Crown, 12 June 1892
  - Iron Cross (1914), 1st Class
  - Service Award Cross
- Hohenzollern: Cross of Honour of the Princely House Order of Hohenzollern, 1st Class with Swords
- Anhalt:
  - Grand Cross of the Order of Albert the Bear, 1882; with Swords, 1914
  - Friedrich Cross
- Baden:
  - Knight of the House Order of Fidelity, 1888
  - Knight of the Order of Berthold the First, 1888
- Bavaria: Knight of St. Hubert, 1889
- Brunswick: Grand Cross of the Order of Henry the Lion, 1888; with Swords, May 1906
- (Saxe-Coburg and Gotha) (Duchy of Saxe-Altenburg) (Saxe-Meiningen) Ernestine duchies: Grand Cross of the Saxe-Ernestine House Order, 1885
- Hesse and by Rhine: Grand Cross of the Ludwig Order, 24 May 1888
- Mecklenburg:
  - Grand Cross of the Wendish Crown, with Crown in Ore
  - Military Merit Cross, 1st Class (Schwerin)
  - Cross for Distinction in War (Strelitz)
- Oldenburg: Grand Cross of the Order of Duke Peter Friedrich Ludwig, with Golden Crown, 18 February 1878; with Swords, 1914
- Saxe-Weimar-Eisenach: Grand Cross of the White Falcon, 1888; with Swords, 1914
- Saxony: Knight of the Rue Crown, 1890
- Waldeck and Pyrmont: Cross of Merit for Civil and Military Performance, 1st Class
- Württemberg:
  - Grand Cross of the Württemberg Crown, 1886
  - Grand Cross of the Military Merit Order
  - Grand Cross of the Friedrich Order

Foreign honours

- (Austrian Empire) (Kingdom of Hungary) Austria-Hungary: Grand Cross of the Royal Hungarian Order of St. Stephen, 1889
- Belgium: Grand Cordon of the Order of Leopold
- Bulgaria:
  - Knight of Saints Cyril and Methodius
  - Grand Cross of St. Alexander
- China: Order of the Double Dragon, Class I Grade II
- Greece: Grand Cross of the Redeemer
- Italy: Knight of the Annunciation, 24 May 1884
- Japan: Grand Cordon of the Order of the Chrysanthemum
- Montenegro: Grand Cross of the Order of Prince Danilo I
- Netherlands: Grand Cross of the Netherlands Lion
- Persia: Order of the August Portrait
- Portugal:
  - Grand Cross of the Sash of the Two Orders
  - Grand Cross of the Tower and Sword
- Romania:
  - Grand Cross of the Star of Romania
  - Grand Cross of the Crown of Romania
  - Cross of Valour, 1st Class
- Russia:
  - Knight of St. Andrew
  - Knight of St. Alexander Nevsky
  - Knight of the White Eagle
  - Knight of St. Anna, 1st Class
  - Knight of St. Stanislaus, 1st Class
  - Knight of St. George, 4th Class
- Serbia: Grand Cross of the White Eagle
- (Thailand) Siam: Grand Cross of the White Elephant
- Spain: Grand Cross of the Order of Charles III, 18 May 1907
- Sweden-Norway:
  - Knight of the Seraphim, with Collar, 4 September 1893
  - Knight of the Order of Charles XIII, 4 September 1893
  - Medal of the Order of the Sword
- United Kingdom: Honorary Grand Cross of the Royal Victorian Order, 29 September 1899

== Ancestry ==
Ancestors of Prince Friedrich Leopold of Prussia

8. Frederick William III of Prussia
4. Prince Charles of Prussia
9. Duchess Louise of Mecklenburg-Strelitz
2. Prince Frederick Charles of Prussia
10. Charles Frederick, Grand Duke of Saxe-Weimar-Eisenach
5. Princess Marie of Saxe-Weimar-Eisenach
11. Grand Duchess Maria Pavlovna of Russia
1. Prince Friedrich Leopold of Prussia
12. Frederick, Hereditary Prince of Anhalt-Dessau
6. Leopold IV, Duke of Anhalt
13. Princess Amalie of Hesse-Homburg
3. Princess Maria Anna of Anhalt-Dessau
14. Prince Louis Charles of Prussia
7. Princess Frederica of Prussia
15. Duchess Frederica of Mecklenburg-Strelitz

== Literature ==
- Zivkovic, Georg: Heer- und Flottenführer der Welt. Biblio Verlag, Osnabrück, 1971 S. 427–428 ISBN 3-7648-0666-4
