= Heinrich XXXII, Prince Reuss of Köstritz =

Member of the House of Reuss (1878–1935)

Prince Heinrich XXXII Reuss of Köstritz
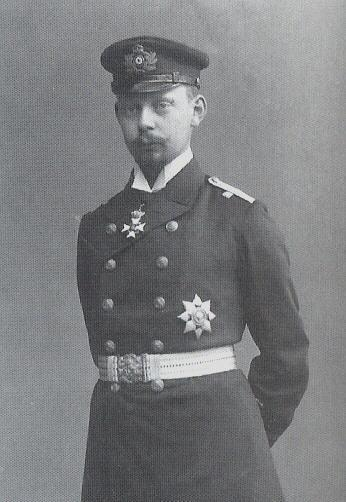
- Heinrich XXXII in uniform
- Born: 4 March 1878; Istanbul, Ottoman Empire
- Died: 6 May 1935 (aged 57); Bad Tölz, Germany
- Spouse: Princess Marie Adelheid of Lippe (m. 1920; div. 1921)
Names
- German: Heinrich XXXII Prinz Reuss zu Köstritz
- House: Reuss
- Father: Prince Heinrich VII Reuss of Köstritz
- Mother: Princess Marie Alexandrine of Saxe-Weimar-Eisenach

Prince Heinrich XXXII Reuss of Köstritz (4 March 1878 – 6 May 1935) was the eldest surviving son of Prince Heinrich VII Reuss of Köstritz and his wife, Princess Marie Alexandrine of Saxe-Weimar-Eisenach.

As Wilhelmina of the Netherlands was childless for the first eight years of her marriage, Heinrich XXXII was third-in-line to the Dutch throne, after the claims of his cousin William Ernest, Grand Duke of Saxe-Weimar-Eisenach and Princess Marie Alexandrine, who was Wilhelmina's cousin, William Ernest's aunt and Heinrich's mother. William Ernest had made it clear however that he would not give up his title of Grand Duke of Saxe-Weimar-Eisenach if that was a requirement for becoming king of the Netherlands. Furthermore, Marie Alexandrine was elderly and prone to sickness. Thus it was assumed that she would give up her claim in favor of her eldest son, Heinrich XXXII. Consequently, Heinrich was for all intents and purposes the heir presumptive to the Dutch throne until the birth of the future Queen Juliana in 1909.

== Family and early life ==
Prince Heinrich XXXII Reuss of Köstritz was born on 4 March 1878 in Istanbul, where his father, who had previously been ambassador to Vienna, was German ambassador. The House of Reuss was one of Europe's oldest royal families, and Heinrich belonged to a younger branch of the family. The House of Reuss practises an unusual system of naming and numbering the male members of the family, every one of which for centuries has borne the name "Heinrich". While most royal and noble houses give numbers only to the reigning head of the house, and that in the order of his reign, the Reuss Younger Line used a numbering sequence for all male family members which began and ended roughly as centuries began and ended. In consequence of this naming system, certain heads of the Reuss Younger Line have had the highest numbers attached to their name of any European nobility.

== Dutch succession ==
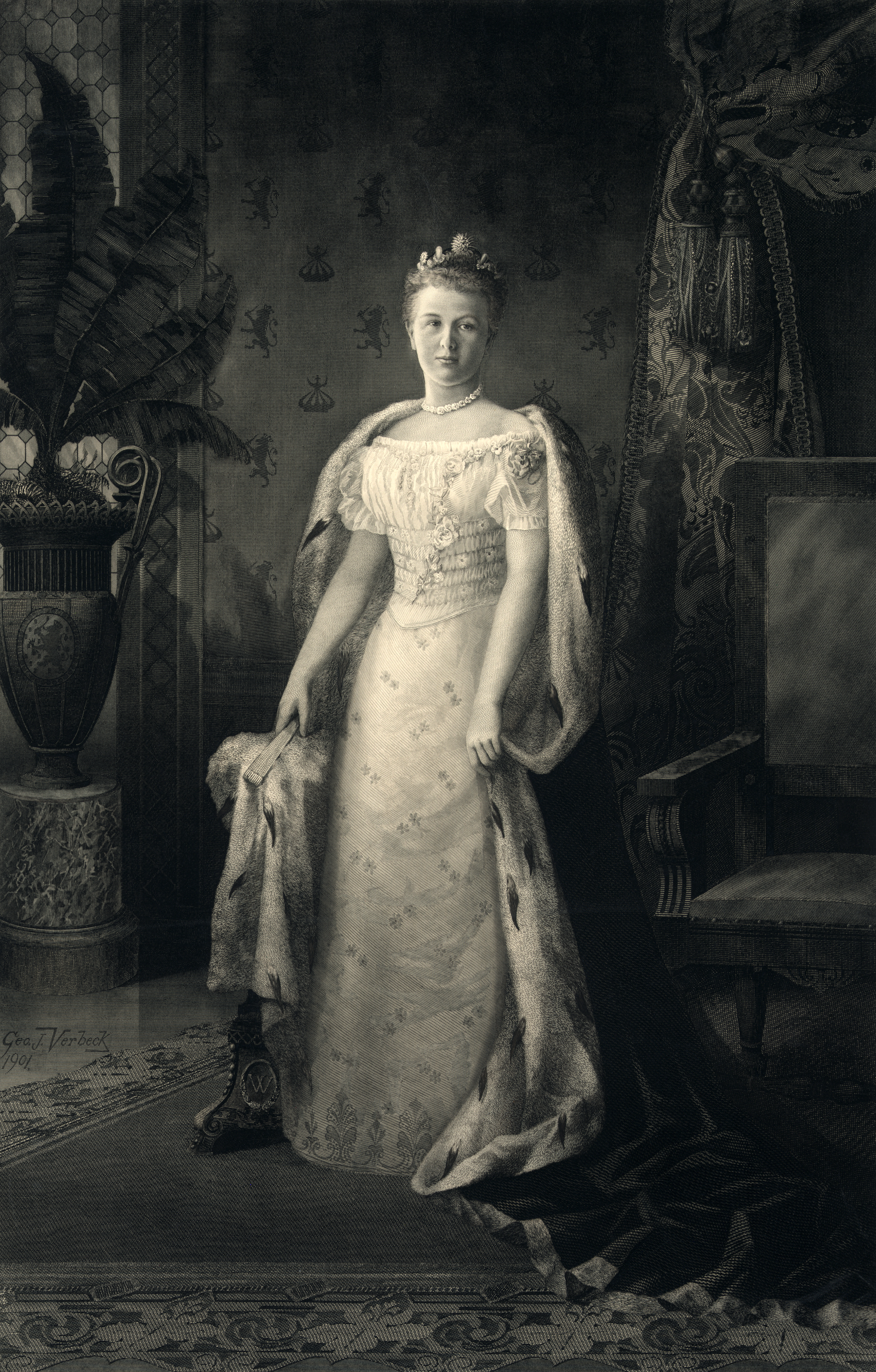
Queen Wilhelmina in 1898, whom it was popularly assumed Heinrich XXXII would succeed. The 1909 birth of her daughter Princess Juliana would assure the succession, and keep the Dutch throne in her family.

=== Background ===
Through his maternal grandmother Princess Sophie of the Netherlands, Heinrich XXXII could claim descent from William II of the Netherlands. As such, he was a second cousin of Queen Wilhelmina of the Netherlands, whose childless marriage was increasingly causing speculation about the succession to the Dutch throne.

Heinrich's cousin William Ernest, Grand Duke of Saxe-Weimar-Eisenach was for much of this period heir presumptive to the Dutch throne. However, the Dutch constitution explicitly prohibited their sovereign from a foreign house from holding another title. The Grand Duke had made it known on more than one occasion his preference for his own duchy versus inheriting the Netherlands crown, as the latter would have required a great deal more work and time. As a consequence, had William Ernest renounced his claim to the throne, his aunt Princess Marie of Saxe-Weimar-Eisenach would have stood next in line. As her eldest son, Heinrich XXXII would next have been in line. Princess Marie was an elderly widow however, and many press reports indicated that she would possibly be giving up her claim to the throne in favor of her eldest son. Heinrich had three younger brothers and a sister, who would have been next line after him. After Marie's children, Heinrich's aunt Princess Elisabeth Sybille of Saxe-Weimar-Eisenach would have been next in line.

=== Education, military career, and travel ===
Heinrich was an officer of the Imperial German navy, holding the rank of lieutenant. As such, he traveled in 1905 to Japan and China, as well to other countries across the world to fulfill his naval duties.

As the assumed heir to the Dutch throne, Heinrich XXXII traveled to the United States in 1906, journeying to San Francisco, Chicago, New York City, Washington D.C., among others. He was described as a very "democratic young nobleman", and was a guest of honor with the German ambassador Speck von Sternburg at the embassy in Washington. No room reservation had been made for him when he arrived at a hotel in Washington, and the desk clerk not recognizing him, asked Heinrich to sign his name in the guest book; this he did, signing "Prince Henry of Reuss, Belair, Md". One account described him as "one of the most democratic and interesting of all the younger royal sons of Europe".

While in the country, Heinrich met with many leaders in business and industry, and was seen to be profoundly interested in their work. After returning from abroad, Heinrich decided to further develop his interest in business, industry, and commerce. He soon quit the imperial navy. In the spring of 1907 after passing difficult entrance exams, he matriculated at the University of Cologne's School of Commerce to pursue business interests. The program was considered the most important business college on the continent. The university director, Prof. Eckert, noted in his inaugural address to students of Heinrich's presence, drawing attention to the fact that the prince's "resolve to devote himself to business pursuits, breaks the prejudice [of]...noble birth" being incompatible with "commercial gain". Eckert went on to say that the school had previously failed to attract young royalty because of its status as a "purely commercial university"; Heinrich's presence, he hoped, would encourage more members of royal families to attend at Cologne. Heinrich's attendance did indeed attract a great deal of attention throughout Germany, as it was the first occasion that a member of one of the reigning houses in Europe joined a business college.

=== Popularity in the Netherlands ===
While pursuing his interests in commerce, Heinrich was still to all intents and purposes the heir to the Dutch throne, as his cousin William Ernest had now made it clear his desire to keep his current title, and pass his claim onto his elderly aunt Princess Marie of Reuss, Heinrich's mother. It was considered particularly interesting and appropriate that Heinrich would attend school for commerce and business because the Netherlands was a country noted for both.

After his education was completed, it was expected that Heinrich would return to the United States for a stay of several months in order to apply his business lessons to practical application. Instead, Heinrich found employment at the German embassy in Paris. As a result of his education and character, Heinrich was reported in the foreign press to be well-known and well regarded in the Netherlands, and was supposed to have left a favorable impression when he stayed there. He was said to be modest, with artistic tastes and interests as a painter and sculptor; furthermore, he was an admirer of Dutch artists like Rembrandt and Frans Hals, which was reported to have helped his popularity.

In Dutch newspapers, the possibility of a succession by Reuss was rejected or mocked. "Should we accept the most current interpretation [of the constitutional order of succession], which would in any case be the one that is least agreeable to our national sentiment, what would happen if one day the Prussian lieutenant Heinrich von Reuss - hastily promoted to admiral if need be - arrived in this country, took up residency in the palace and said: "Meine Herrn Holländer! ich bin hier der König! [My gentlemen Dutchmen! I'm the king over here!]? However constitutional, calm and royalist the Dutch might be, they would undoubtedly think, and say it, too, that they never had any dealings with prince Heinrich von Reuss-Schleitz-Köstritz, just as he hadn't with them, and that they didn't want him as King", the Haagsche Courant wrote in 1905.

A commentator of the Bataviaasch Nieuwsblad wrote: "[...]His careless, dour appearance could be a mask, behind which an ardent love for the Dutch nation is hiding - but I bet my little finger that the entire nation would rather see someone else than him taking the place of the Queen.".

Citing a report by the Berliner Tagesblatt, the Peel- en Kempenbode wrote in 1908: "We never heard anything about [...] the favourable impression young Reuss is supposed to have made over here and in the Indies."

The Dutch people were still fervently hoping for the birth of an heir to Queen Wilhelmina, as evident in newspapers during that time. The Dutch treasured their neutrality in the face of war, and were thus fearful of German encroachment, especially since Heinrich himself had served in the Imperial navy, and had close ties to the Imperial family. One publication lamented that if the Queen were to remain childless, the Dutch Crown "was bound to pass into the possession of a German prince, whose birth, training, and affiliations would naturally have led him to bring Holland within the sphere of the German Empire, at the expense of her independence, both national and economic".

=== Constitutional issues and the birth of an heir ===
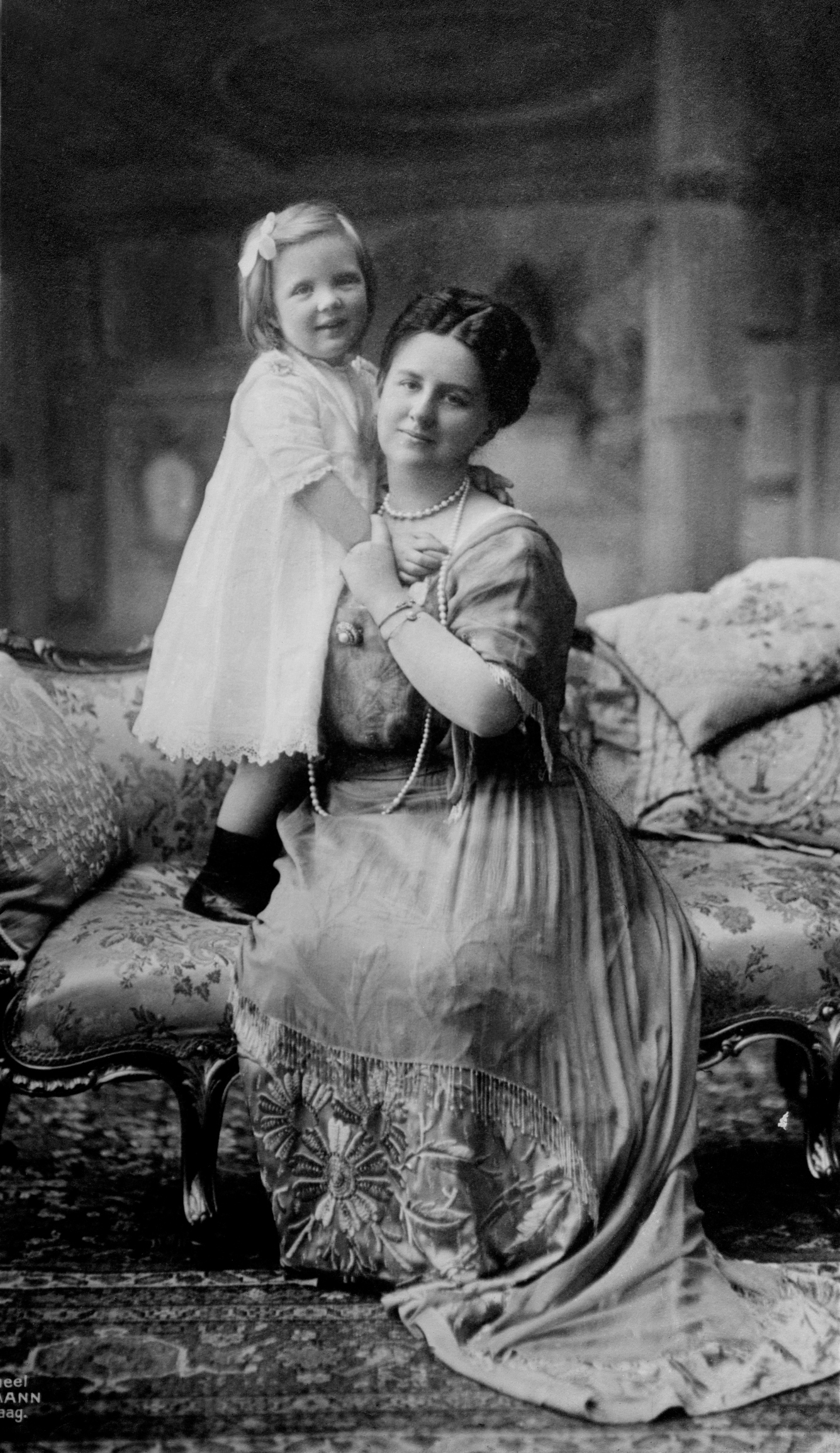
Princess Juliana with her mother, Queen Wilhelmina, c. 1914

A government bill was presented to the Dutch States-General in 1905 for a revision of the constitution. Its purpose was to revise the laws of succession, and allow the governing body the right to select their own ruler in the event of Queen Wilhelmina dying childless. At the same time, it was proposed that Heinrich XXXII should be proclaimed Crown Prince of The Netherlands, take up residence at The Hague, and become more familiar with the Dutch people. If the various parties involved refused, they proposed pursuing the bill and changing the succession so that they might choose a more agreeable candidate; the majority of the Dutch people were in favor of the latter plan.

In 1907, there were fears that Wilhelmina was going to abdicate in favor of her Saxe-Weimar cousins, as a clause in a recent legislative bill submitted to the Dutch parliament called for the exclusion from the succession of children born after the abdication of a sovereign. Such fears were misplaced however, as Wilhelmina later elaborated that she had no wish of abdicating, and that the legislation was directed at the widowed and childless Grand Duke of Saxe-Weimar-Eisenach, who, though well known to be considering giving up his claim to the throne, was considering marrying again; there would have been considerable confusion as a result were he to give up the succession claim in favor of his aunt Marie, only to later pass his claim onto any children he might have.

In 1909, the country's hopes were finally realized. After suffering numerous miscarriages, an heir, Crown Princess Juliana was finally born to Queen Wilhelmina, thus securing the Dutch succession for another generation.

== Marriage ==
On 19 May 1920, Heinrich married Princess Marie Adelheid of Lippe, daughter of Prince Rudolf of Lippe and his wife, Princess Luise von Ardeck. She was coincidentally a cousin of Prince Bernhard of Lippe-Biesterfeld, husband of Princess Juliana. He was seventeen years older, and they were divorced the following year, on 18 February 1921. Two months later on 12 April 1921 at Bremen, Marie Adelheid subsequently remarried to Heinrich's youngest brother Prince Heinrich XXXV Reuss of Köstritz, producing one son before their divorce in 1923 (Heinrich XXXV had to divorce his wife of ten years Princess Marie of Saxe-Altenburg for his marriage to Marie Adelheid to occur). Marie Adelheid would become a prominent Nazi socialite in later years, serving as an aide to Richard Walther Darré. Her choice of third husband, commoner Friedrich Kurt Hanno Konopath, was in reaction to her first two unhappy marriages, and would reflect her changing views of a new nobility dictated not only by blood, but also support of certain ideals.

Prince Heinrich XXXII never remarried, and died childless on 6 May 1935, aged 57, at Bad Tölz, Germany.

== See also ==
- List of heirs to the Dutch throne

== Ancestry ==
Ancestors of Heinrich XXXII, Prince Reuss of Köstritz

8. Prince Heinrich XLIV Reuss of Köstritz
4. Heinrich LXIII, Prince Reuss of Köstritz
9. Baroness Wilhelmine von Geuder genannt Rabensteiner
2. Heinrich VII, Prince Reuss of Köstritz
10. Count Henry of Stolberg-Wernigerode
5. Countess Eleonore of Stolberg-Wernigerode
11. Princess Jenny of Schönburg-Waldenburg
1. Prince Heinrich XXXII Reuss of Köstritz
12. Charles Frederick, Grand Duke of Saxe-Weimar-Eisenach
6. Charles Alexander, Grand Duke of Saxe-Weimar-Eisenach
13. Grand Duchess Maria Pavlovna of Russia
3. Princess Marie of Saxe-Weimar-Eisenach
14. William II of the Netherlands
7. Princess Sophie of the Netherlands
15. Grand Duchess Anna Pavlovna of Russia
