= Portrait of Louise of Mecklenburg-Strelitz =

Painting by Élisabeth Vigée Le Brun

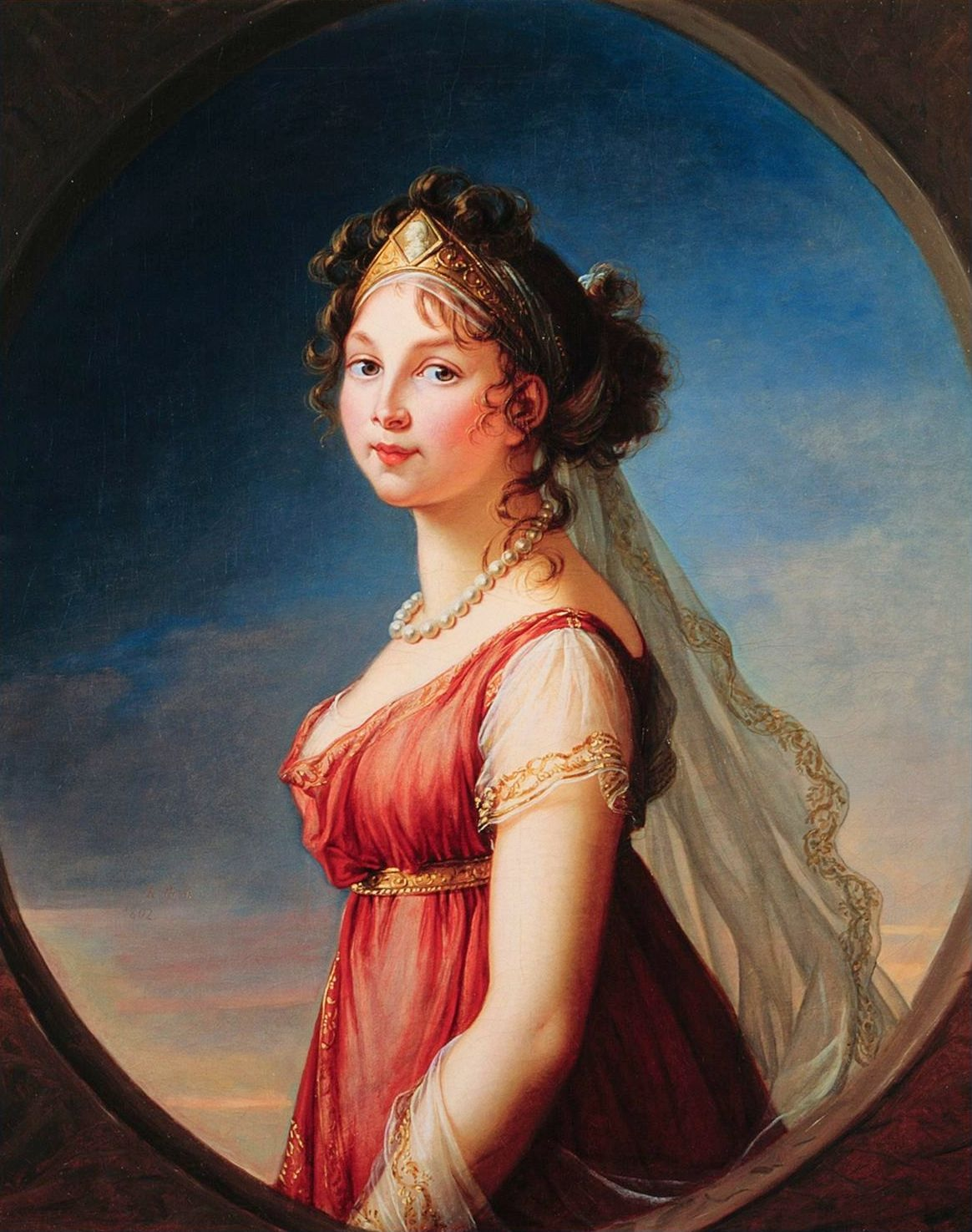
- Artist: Élisabeth Vigée Le Brun
- Year: 1802
- Type: Oil on canvas, portrait painting
- Dimensions: 100 cm × 83.5 cm (39 in × 32.9 in)
- Location: Hohenzollern Castle, Bisingen

Portrait of Louise of Mecklenburg-Strelitz is an 1802 portrait painting by the French artist Élisabeth Vigée Le Brun. It depicts Louise of Mecklenburg-Strelitz the wife of Frederick William III and the queen consort of the Prussia.

Following the French Revolution Le Brun, who had enjoyed a close relationship with Marie Antoinette and the royal family, went into exile and worked in several different countries. After a spell in Saint Petersburg she arrived in Prussia and within three days was commanded to Potsdam Palace outside Berlin to provide this portrait. The queen was friendly and kind towards to her and sat for several sittings which led to pastel sketches. Le Brun later completed the painting when she returned to Paris for the first time for many years.

Today the painting is in the collection of Hohenzollern Castle in Bisingen, a historic residence of the Hohenzollern dynasty into which she has married.

== Bibliography ==
- Baillio, Joseph, Baetjer, Katharine & Lang, Paul. Vigée Le Brun. Metropolitan Museum of Art, 2016.
- Cromwell, Judith Lissauer. Louise-Elisabeth Vigee Le Brun: Portrait of an Artist, 1755-1842. McFarland, Incorporated, 2025.
- Goodden, Angelica. The Sweetness of Life: A Biography of Elisabeth Louise Vigée Le Brun. Andre Deutsch, 1997.
- Moyle, Franny. Mrs Kauffman and Madame Le Brun: The Entwined Lives of Two Great Eighteenth-Century Women Artists. Bloomsbury Publishing, 2025.
