= Anson Wood Burchard =

American businessman

Anson Wood Burchard (April 21, 1865 – January 22, 1927) was an American businessman. He was the vice-chairman of General Electric and the chairman of General Electric International, having served many years as a vice president of General Electric. In addition, he was a director for several public utility companies.

Burchard was an associate of AIEE. During WWI, he acted as assistant to Benedict Crowell, who was Director of Munitions. He was the third husband of Allene Tew.

He died suddenly on January 22, 1927 at the home of Mortimer L. Schiff. Anson is buried at Locust Valley Cemetery, Locust Valley, New York.
