= Princess Elisabeth Sybille of Saxe-Weimar-Eisenach =

German princess and patron of the arts

Princess Elisabeth of Saxe-Weimar-Eisenach
- Duchess John Albert of Mecklenburg-Schwerin
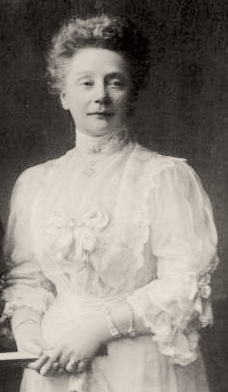
- Elisabeth , c. 1907
- Born: 28 February 1854; Weimar, Saxe-Weimar-Eisenach
- Died: 10 July 1908 (aged 54); Schloss Wiligrad near Lübstorf, Germany
- Burial: Doberan Abbey
- Spouse: Duke John Albert of Mecklenburg (m. 1886)
- House: House of Saxe-Weimar-Eisenach
- Father: Charles Alexander, Grand Duke of Saxe-Weimar-Eisenach
- Mother: Princess Sophie of the Netherlands

Princess Elisabeth of Saxe-Weimar-Eisenach (German: Elisabeth Sybille Maria Dorothea Luise Anne Amália von Sachsen-Weimar-Eisenach; 28 February 1854 – 10 July 1908) was a member of the House of Saxe-Weimar-Eisenach and a Duchess of Mecklenburg by marriage.

== Life ==
Born in Weimar, she was the youngest daughter of Charles Alexander, Grand Duke of Saxe-Weimar-Eisenach and Princess Sophie of the Netherlands. Elisabeth grew up in a household that was a center for European music, often interacting with composers like Franz Liszt.

As a granddaughter of William II of the Netherlands, she was a prominent figure in the Dutch line of succession during the late 19th century. She was described by contemporaries as an accomplished pianist and a patron of the Weimar conservatory.

== Married and later life ==
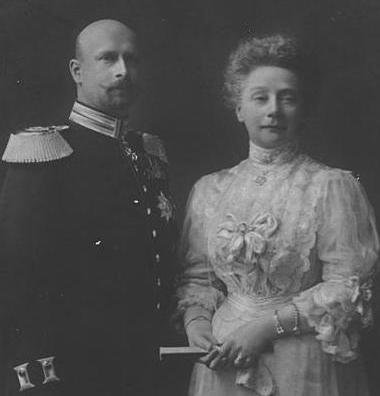
Elisabeth with her husband Duke John Albert of Mecklenburg, 1907.

On 6 November 1886, she married Duke John Albert of Mecklenburg. The marriage was childless, but the couple was known for their joint interest in German colonial expansion and the arts.

She served as the consort during John Albert's regencies in Mecklenburg-Schwerin and Brunswick. Her influence was instrumental in the design of Schloss Wiligrad, which became a meeting point for the European nobility. Elisabeth died in 1908 after a prolonged illness and was buried with full state honors.

== Ancestry ==
Ancestors of Princess Elisabeth Sybille of Saxe-Weimar-Eisenach

8. Charles Augustus, Grand Duke of Saxe-Weimar-Eisenach
4. Charles Frederick, Grand Duke of Saxe-Weimar-Eisenach
9. Landgravine Louise of Hesse-Darmstadt
2. Charles Alexander, Grand Duke of Saxe-Weimar-Eisenach
10. Paul I of Russia
5. Grand Duchess Maria Pavlovna of Russia
11. Sophie Dorothea of Württemberg
1. Princess Elisabeth of Saxe-Weimar-Eisenach
12. William I of the Netherlands
6. William II of the Netherlands
13. Princess Wilhelmine of Prussia
3. Princess Sophie of the Netherlands
14. Paul I of Russia
7. Anna Pavlovna of Russia
15. Sophie Dorothea of Württemberg
