= Prince Friedrich Leopold of Prussia (1895–1959) =

Prussian prince and art collector (1895–1959)

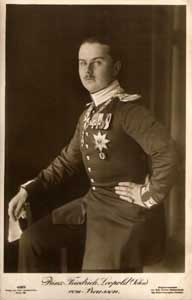
- The Prince in uniform (1914)
- Born: Franz Joseph Oskar Ernst Patrick Friedrich Leopold Prinz von Preußen; 27 August 1895; Berlin, German Empire
- Died: 27 November 1959 (aged 64); Lugano, Switzerland
- House: Hohenzollern
- Father: Prince Friedrich Leopold of Prussia
- Mother: Princess Louise Sophie of Schleswig-Holstein-Sonderburg-Augustenburg
- Occupation: Art dealer, collector

Franz Joseph Oskar Ernst Patrick Friedrich Leopold Prinz von Preußen (27 August 1895, in Berlin – 27 November 1959, in Lugano) was a German art collector and dealer. During World War II, he was an inmate at Dachau concentration camp.

== Biography ==
He was the son of Prince Friedrich Leopold of Prussia and Princess Louise Sophie of Schleswig-Holstein-Sonderburg-Augustenburg, and a nephew of German Empress Augusta Victoria, his mother's elder sister. Originally trained by tutors, at the age of ten, as was customary, he received the Order of the Black Eagle. The following year, he became a Lieutenant in the First Foot Guards.

In 1912, he became interested in painting, and took drawing lessons from Karl Hagemeister. At the outbreak of World War I, he started his military service, but was soon discharged due to poor health. This enabled him to attend the Academy of Fine Arts, Munich, where he studied with Carl von Marr, among others. He also began collecting art.

His unrestrained collecting put him heavily in debt. As a result, in 1917, the Ministry of the Royal House initiated an "Entmündigung" (incapacitation procedure), with the intent of placing him under a guardianship. The Prince filed a counter-suit, claiming that his collection had appreciated in value, and was now worth as much or more than the amount he owed. In addition, he argued that the Ministry had no standing in the matter of civil suits. In 1918, following widely publicized hearings, which reached the Kammergericht (Berlin State Supreme Court), the Ministry agreed to halt its proceedings.

In the 1920s and 1930s, he continued collecting and worked as an art dealer; trading in art objects and autographs from the collection of his great-grandfather, Prince Charles of Prussia. As he had a right of residence at Glienicke Palace, he made the assumption that he had property rights there as well.

He lived with his private secretary, Friedrich Freiherr Cerrini de Monte Varchi (1895–1985), known as "Pierrot", in the "gentleman's wing" of the Palace. One of his best clients was the American diplomat and collector, Robert Woods Bliss. One of the pieces that Bliss purchased in 1937, a 12th-century Byzantine tondo from the Palace's monastery courtyard, led to a criminal investigation and proceedings at the Potsdam District Court, which resulted in heavy fines for the Prince and Cerrini.

After selling the castle in 1939, he and Cerrini moved to a villa, "Gut Imlau", near Werfen in Salzburger Land. He took numerous art works and the family archives with him. The remainder was bequeathed to the Prussian Palaces and Gardens Foundation Berlin-Brandenburg.

=== Dachau ===
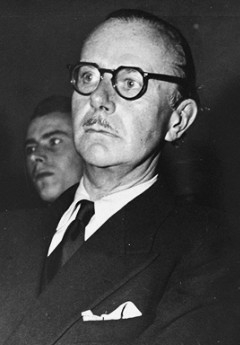
At the Dachau trials (1945)

The prince was rumored to be homosexual, and in 1941, the German diarist Friedrich Reck-Malleczewen recorded that Friedrich Leopold was being periodically arrested by Nazi officials in order to extort money from his mother, of whose four children Friedrich was the only survivor.

In May 1944, he and Cerrini were arrested in Bad Gastein for listening to a "Feindsender" (enemy radio station). Some sources claim they were actually charged with violating "Section 175", which prohibited homosexual activity. Later that year, the Prince was remanded to Dachau.

In 1945, he was part of a group of high-status prisoners and Sippenhaften (people guilty by kinship), who were transported to South Tyrol by the SS. A few of the prisoners managed to contact officers of the regular German Army and express their fears that they were going to be executed. They were rescued by Captain Wichard von Alvensleben and took refuge until American troops arrived. The Prince waited until June, so he could be available to American officials in Italy.

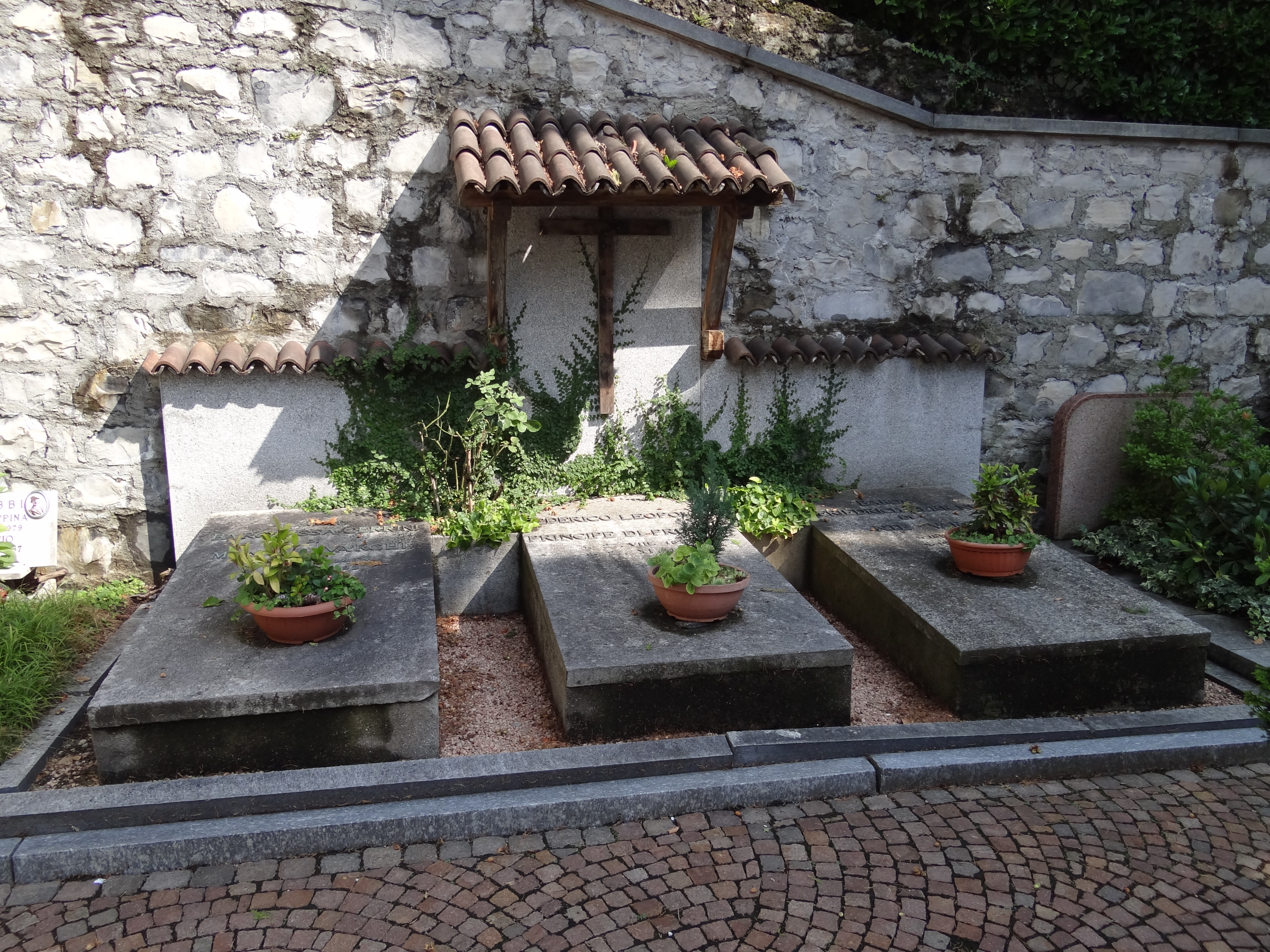
The prince's grave at cimitero di Castagnola, Lugano (Switzerland)

In the first of the Dachau trials, he served as a witness against numerous camp officials, including the Commandant, Martin Gottfried Weiss. Forty of them were found guilty, and thirty-six were sentenced to death.

He never returned to Germany, choosing instead to settle in Switzerland.

He died fourteen years later, on 27 November 1959 in Lugano, aged 64. His body was buried in the Cimitero di Castagnola, Lugano, Switzerland.

== Ancestry ==
Ancestors of Prince Friedrich Leopold of Prussia (1895–1959)

8. Prince Charles of Prussia
4. Prince Frederick Charles of Prussia
9. Princess Marie of Saxe-Weimar-Eisenach
2. Prince Friedrich Leopold of Prussia
10. Leopold IV, Duke of Anhalt
5. Princess Maria Anna of Anhalt-Dessau
11. Princess Frederica of Prussia
1. Prince Friedrich Leopold of Prussia
12. Christian August II, Duke of Schleswig-Holstein-Sonderburg-Augustenburg
6. Frederick VIII, Duke of Schleswig-Holstein
13. Countess Louise Danneskiold-Samsøe
3. Princess Louise Sophie of Schleswig-Holstein-Sonderburg-Augustenburg
14. Ernst I, Prince of Hohenlohe-Langenburg
7. Princess Adelheid of Hohenlohe-Langenburg
15. Princess Feodora of Leiningen
