= Princess Louise Sophie of Schleswig-Holstein-Sonderburg-Augustenburg =

Princess Louise Sophie
- Princess Friedrich Leopold of Prussia
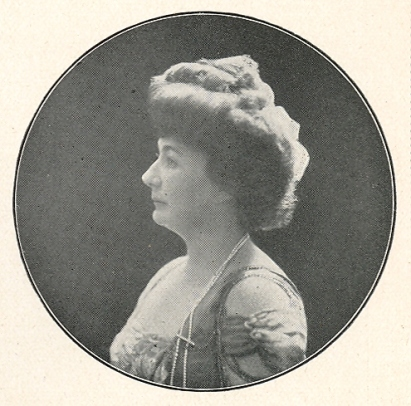
- Born: 8 April 1866; Kiel, Schleswig-Holstein
- Died: 28 April 1952 (aged 86); Bad Nauheim, Hesse, Germany
- Spouse: Prince Friedrich Leopold of Prussia (m. 1889; died 1931)
- Issue: Princess Victoria Margaret; Prince Friedrich Sigismund; Prince Friedrich Karl; Prince Friedrich Leopold
Names
- German: Feodora Luise Sophie Adelaide Henrietta Amelia
- House: Schleswig-Holstein-Sonderburg-Augustenburg
- Father: Frederick VIII, Duke of Schleswig-Holstein
- Mother: Adelheid of Hohenlohe-Langenburg

Princess Louise Sophie of Schleswig-Holstein-Sonderburg-Augustenburg (German: Feodora Luise Sophie Adelheid Henriette Amalie; 8 April 1866 – 28 April 1952) was a daughter of Frederick VIII, Duke of Schleswig-Holstein and Princess Adelheid of Hohenlohe-Langenburg. She wrote poetry under the pseudonym F. Hugin, which was set to music by composer Anna Teichmüller.

== Family ==
Louise was the sixth child and third daughter of Frederick VIII, Duke of Schleswig-Holstein and his wife Princess Adelheid of Hohenlohe-Langenburg. She was a younger sister of Augusta Viktoria, Empress of Germany and Ernst Gunther, Duke of Schleswig-Holstein.

Louise's paternal grandparents were Christian, Duke of Augustenburg and Louise Sophie, Countess of Danneskiold-Samsøe. Her maternal grandparents were Ernst I, Prince of Hohenlohe-Langenburg and Princess Feodora of Leiningen. Feodora was a half-sister of Queen Victoria.

== Marriage and children ==
On 24 June 1889, Louise married Prince Friedrich Leopold of Prussia. He was the youngest child and only son of Prince Frederick Charles of Prussia and Princess Maria Anna of Anhalt-Dessau, and was a great-grandson of Frederick William III of Prussia. Their decision to marry seemingly confirmed that old scores could be forgotten (the groom's father Prince Friedrich Karl had been instrumental in the Prussian victory against Denmark over Schleswig-Holstein in the Second Schleswig War).

The wedding was a grand affair held at Charlottenburg Palace in Berlin. One viewer commented that the ceremonies "were performed with all the splendor which such an event demanded, and which showed that the Emperor is willing to abate nothing of the traditional pomp and circumstance of his predecessors, nay, rather to increase them". Many important royal figures attended, which included Louise's brother-in-law, Emperor Wilhelm, and King George I of Greece. They had four children:

- Princess Victoria Margaret of Prussia (17 April 1890 – 9 September 1923) she married Prince Heinrich XXXIII Reuss zu Köstritz on 17 May 1913 and they were divorced in 1922. They had two children.
- Prince Friedrich Sigismund of Prussia (17 December 1891 – 6 July 1927) he married Princess Marie Louise of Schaumburg-Lippe (a daughter of Princess Louise of Denmark) on 27 April 1916. They had two children.
- Prince Friedrich Karl of Prussia (6 April 1893 – 6 April 1917); Olympic medalist for the German equestrian team; died in World War I.
- Prince Friedrich Leopold of Prussia (27 August 1895-27 November 1959); Prisoner in Dachau concentration camp

Louise had several near-death experiences. In 1896, Louise and one of her ladies broke through the ice while skating near Glienicke Castle in Potsdam. Although they were rescued, Prince Friedrich was upbraided by Wilhelm II of Germany and was ordered under arrest for two weeks in his room. Wilhelm was Louise's brother-in-law, and according to one source, apparently upbraided Prince Friedrich for his indifference of the treatment of his wife. The following year, Louise slipped off her saddle while riding a horse, and was dragged for some distance down the road. She was finally rescued by her husband and an aide-de-camp.

Louise often represented her sister, the Empress, at social engagements and visits to hospitals. She faced much personal tragedy, as three of her children died young; Friedrich Karl died from his wounds in World War I in 1917, Viktoria died of the flu in 1923, and Friedrich Sigismund died after a fall from his horse in 1927. Louise would die herself on 28 April 1952, aged 86, in Bad Nauheim, Germany.

== Ancestry ==
Ancestors of Princess Louise Sophie of Schleswig-Holstein-Sonderburg-Augustenburg

8. Frederick Christian II, Duke of Schleswig-Holstein-Sonderburg-Augustenburg
4. Christian Augustus II, Duke of Schleswig-Holstein-Sonderburg-Augustenburg
9. Princess Louise Augusta of Denmark
2. Frederick VIII, Duke of Schleswig-Holstein
10. Count Christian Danneskiold-Samsøe
5. Countess Louise Danneskiold-Samsøe
11. Henriette Kaas
1. Princess Louise Sophie of Schleswig-Holstein-Sonderburg-Augustenburg
12. Karl Ludwig, Prince of Hohenlohe-Langenburg
6. Ernst I, Prince of Hohenlohe-Langenburg
13. Countess Amalie Henriette of Solms-Baruth
3. Princess Adelheid of Hohenlohe-Langenburg
14. Emich Carl, Prince of Leiningen
7. Princess Feodora of Leiningen
15. Princess Victoria of Saxe-Coburg-Saalfeld
