= Princess Marie Alexandrine of Saxe-Weimar-Eisenach =

Princess Marie Alexandrine
- Princess Heinrich VII Reuss of Köstritz
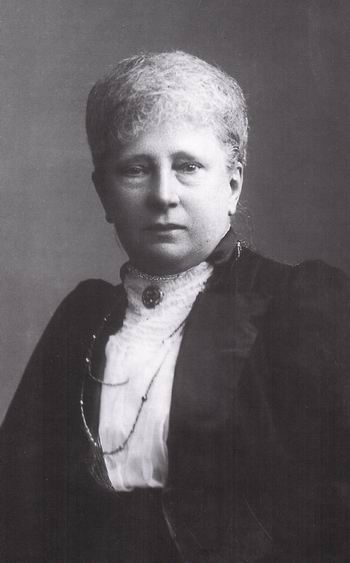
- Princess Marie, c. 1900
- Born: 20 January 1849; Weimar
- Died: 6 May 1922 (aged 73); Trebschen
- Spouse: Prince Heinrich VII Reuss of Köstritz (m. 1876; died 1906)
- Issue Detail: Prince Heinrich XXXII; Prince Heinrich XXXIII; Princess Johanna; Sophie Renate, Princess Heinrich XXXIV Reuss of Köstritz; Prince Heinrich XXXV
Names
- Marie Alexandrine Anne Sophie Auguste Helene Prinzessin von Sachsen-Weimar-Eisenach
- House: House of Saxe-Weimar-Eisenach (by birth); House of Reuss (by marriage)
- Father: Charles Alexander, Grand Duke of Saxe-Weimar-Eisenach
- Mother: Princess Sophie of the Netherlands

Princess Marie Alexandrine of Saxe-Weimar-Eisenach (Marie Alexandrine Anne Sophie Auguste Helene; 20 January 1849 – 6 May 1922) was the eldest daughter and second child of Charles Alexander, Grand Duke of Saxe-Weimar-Eisenach and his wife Princess Sophie of the Netherlands.

Through her mother, Marie was second-in-line to the Dutch throne after her nephew William Ernest, Grand Duke of Saxe-Weimar-Eisenach from 1900 to the birth of Princess Juliana in 1909. As her nephew was expected to abdicate his right to the throne in favor of retaining his title, Marie was expected to directly inherit the Dutch Crown upon the possible death of her still childless cousin Wilhelmina. The birth of Juliana subsequently changed the succession.

== Biography ==
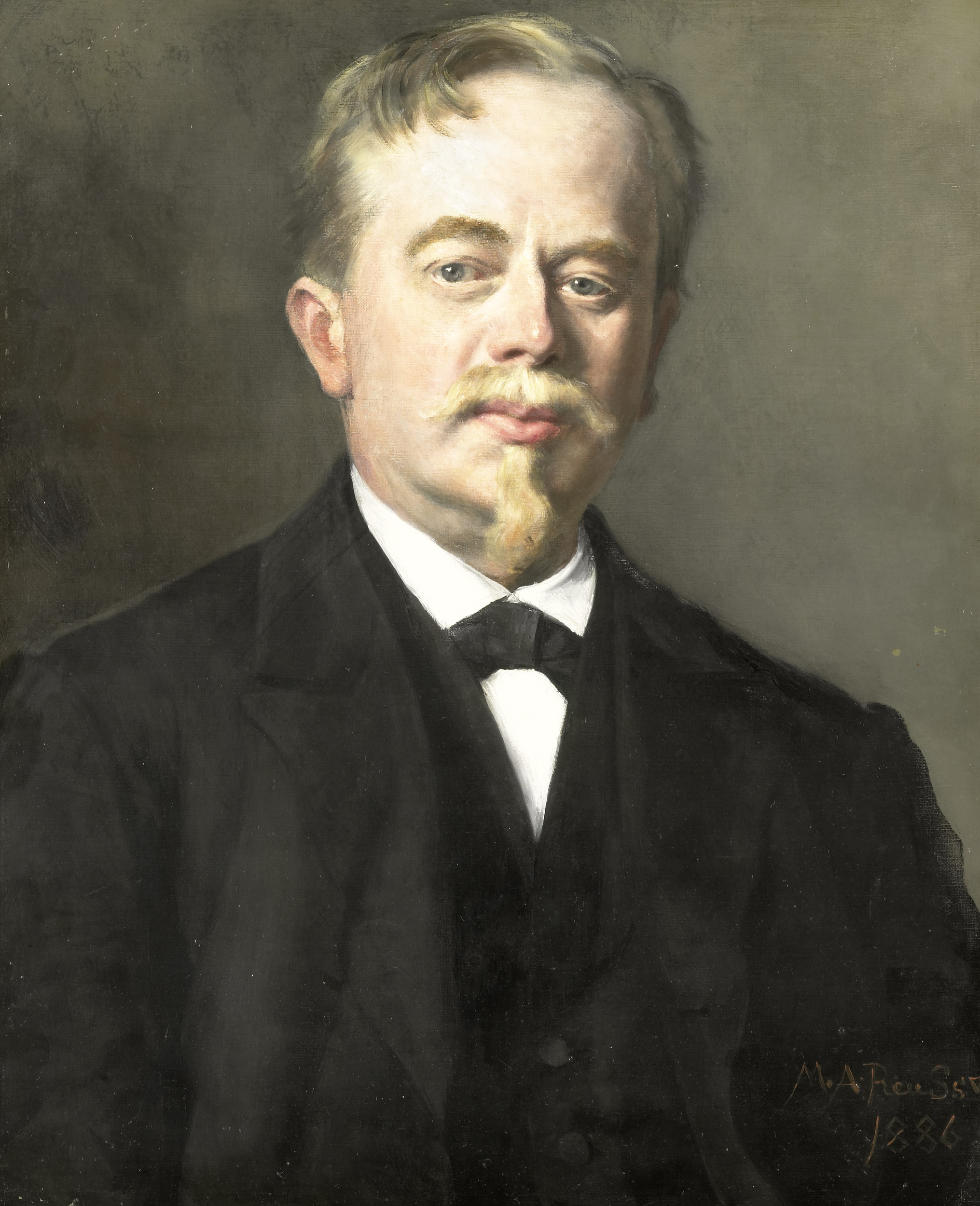
Portrait of August Allebé

The young princess studied painting and made a portrait of the popular teacher August Allebé in 1886, which indicates that she probably attended a few of his open studio lessons for ladies in Amsterdam, but also indicated that she had not given up painting after her marriage.

During her time as the German ambassador's wife in Constantinople during the Russo-Turkish War (1877-1878) , she arranged for the provision of German Sisters of Mercy (Barmherzige Schwestern vom heiligen Kreuz) to care for the wounded at military hospitals established as part of the newfound Red Crescent organisation.

=== Marriage and issue ===
As a young girl, Marie and her cousin Princess Pauline were considered as possible brides for Albert Edward, Prince of Wales (the future Edward VII of the United Kingdom). Nothing came of this however, as his mother Queen Victoria believed Marie's teeth to be "almost black"; both girls were considered nice, but "delicate and not pretty". The prince later married Princess Alexandra of Denmark.

On 6 February 1876 in Weimar, Marie married Prince Heinrich VII Reuss of Köstritz. They had the following children:

- Son (1877)
- Prince Heinrich XXXII Reuss of Köstritz (1878–1935); married Princess Marie Adelheid of Lippe-Biesterfeld (1895–1993)
- Prince Heinrich XXXIII Reuss of Köstritz (1879–1942); married firstly Princess Victoria Margaret of Prussia (1890–1923) and secondly Allene Tew (1876–1955)
- Princess Johanna Reuss of Köstritz (1882–1883)
- Princess Sophie Renate Reuss of Köstritz (1884–1968); married Prince Heinrich XXXIV Reuss (1887–1956). Sophie Renate and Heinrich are the maternal grandparents of Wolfgang-Ernst, Prince of Ysenburg and Büdingen.
- Prince Heinrich XXXV Reuss of Köstritz (1887–1936); married Princess Marie of Saxe-Altenburg (1888–1947, daughter of Prince Albert of Saxe-Altenburg) and secondly Princess Marie Adelheid of Lippe-Biesterfeld (1895–1993)

=== Dutch succession ===
The death of William III of the Netherlands meant his daughter Wilhelmina became Queen at the age of ten. Wilhelmina married Duke Henry of Mecklenburg-Schwerin in 1901, but the marriage remained childless for almost a decade. Thus between 1890 and 1909 the heirs to the Dutch throne were first, Marie's mother Princess Sophie of the Netherlands and with her death in 1897 her grandson William Ernest, Grand Duke of Saxe-Weimar-Eisenach. The succession issue became particularly important after Queen Wilhelmina suffered from an attack of typhoid in the early 1900s.

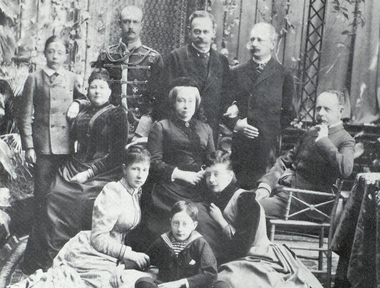
The Saxe-Weimar royal family, c. 1886.

William Ernst however had stated repeatedly that he had no wish to inherit the throne if given the opportunity, as the Dutch constitution required that he would have to give up his title as Grand Duke of Saxe-Weimar-Eisenach. Due to this fact, the heir to the Dutch throne would have become his aunt Marie followed by her eldest son Prince Heinrich XXXII Reuss of Köstritz. As her son was serving as a lieutenant in the German navy, concerns were raised by many (particularly the British and the French) of the dangers the Netherlands would be under - were a German prince with close ties to the Hohenzollern royal family to succeed to the Dutch throne - . One publication lamented that if the Queen were to remain childless, the Dutch Crown "was bound to pass into the possession of a German prince, whose birth, training, and affiliations would naturally have led him to bring Holland within the sphere of the German Empire, at the expense of her independence, both national and economic". By the time of these events Princess Marie was an elderly widow with ill-health, and thus there was speculation that she herself would also give up her claim to the Dutch throne in favor of her eldest son, who was in his mid-twenties.

In 1907, there were fears that Wilhelmina was going to abdicate in favor of her Saxe-Weimar cousins, as a clause in a recent legislative bill submitted to the Dutch parliament called for the exclusion from the succession of children born after the abdication of a sovereign. Such fears were misplaced however, as Wilhelmina later elaborated that she had no wish of abdicating, and that the legislation was directed at the widowed and childless Grand Duke of Saxe-Weimar-Eisenach, who, though well known to be considering giving up his claim to the throne, was considering marrying again; there would have been considerable confusion as a result were he to give up the succession claim in favor of his aunt Marie, only to later pass his claim onto any children he might have.

Queen Wilhelmina suffered multiple miscarriages during her marriage, increasing speculation of the succession. The birth of Princess Juliana in 1909 put everyone's fears to rest, as the Dutch succession was now secured for another generation.

Princess Marie died on 6 May 1922 in Trebschen.

== See also ==
- List of heirs to the Dutch throne

== Ancestry ==
Ancestors of Princess Marie Alexandrine of Saxe-Weimar-Eisenach

8. Charles Augustus, Grand Duke of Saxe-Weimar-Eisenach
4. Charles Frederick, Grand Duke of Saxe-Weimar-Eisenach
9. Princess Louise of Hesse-Darmstadt
2. Charles Alexander, Grand Duke of Saxe-Weimar-Eisenach
10. Paul I of Russia
5. Grand Duchess Maria Pavlovna of Russia
11. Duchess Sophie Dorothea of Württemburg
1. Princess Marie of Saxe-Weimar-Eisenach
12. William I of the Netherlands
6. William II of the Netherlands
13. Princess Wilhelmine of Prussia
3. Princess Sophie of the Netherlands
14. Paul I of Russia (= 10)
7. Grand Duchess Anna Pavlovna of Russia
15. Duchess Sophie Dorothea of Württemburg (= 11)
