= Prince Friedrich Karl of Prussia (1893–1917) =

German prince and equestrian

Prince Friedrich Karl
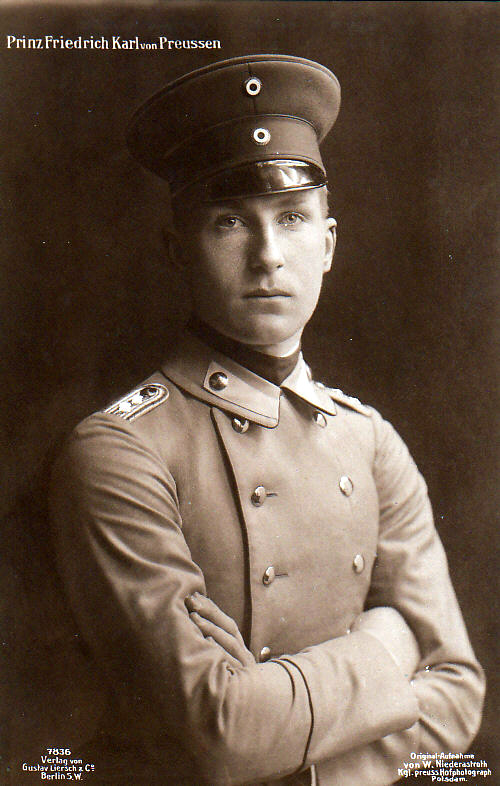
- Prince Friedrich Karl in his military uniform (1913)
- Born: 6 April 1893; Schloss Klein-Glienicke, Potsdam, German Empire
- Died: 6 April 1917 (aged 24); Saint-Étienne-du-Rouvray, France
Names
- Tassilo Wilhelm Humbert Leopold Friedrich Karl
- House: House of Hohenzollern
- Father: Prince Friedrich Leopold of Prussia
- Mother: Princess Louise Sophie of Schleswig-Holstein-Sonderburg-Augustenburg

Olympic medal record

Men's Equestrian
Bronze medal – third place	1912 Stockholm	Team jumping

Prince Friedrich Karl of Prussia (Tassilo Wilhelm Humbert Leopold Friedrich Karl; 6 April 1893 – 6 April 1917) was a German prince and competitive horseman who competed in the 1912 Summer Olympics.

== Early life and ancestry ==
Prince Friedrich Karl was born in Schloss Klein-Glienicke, Potsdam, Berlin, as a member of the House of Hohenzollern, that ruled over the German Empire. He was the son of Prince Friedrich Leopold of Prussia (1865–1931) and Princess Louise Sophie of Schleswig-Holstein-Sonderburg-Augustenburg (1866–1952) and a grandson of Prince Frederick Charles of Prussia.

== Olympics ==
He was a member of the 1912 German Olympic equestrian team, which won a bronze medal in the team jumping event. His horse during the Olympic competition was "Gibson Boy".

== Military career ==
He fought in World War I as an aviator between 1914 and 1917. He commanded Fliegerabteilung (Artillerie) 258, an artillery spotting unit, but flew patrols in a single-seat fighter with Jasta Boelcke whenever possible. During one such patrol, on 21 March 1917, he was forced to land because of a bullet in his engine and with a slight wound to his foot, suffered in combat with Fl Lt Charles Edward Murray Pickthorn. He landed his Albatross aircraft in no-man's land, but while running towards his own lines, he was shot in the back and severely wounded by Australian troops. He was taken into captivity.

== Death ==
During the captivity, he died from his injuries on 6 April 1917 (his 24th birthday) at Saint-Étienne-du-Rouvray.

His body was buried in the Cimetière, Saint-Étienne-du-Rouvray.

Friedrich Karl's mother later told a friend that upon learning of her son's death, Kaiser Wilhelm II sent the family a two-word telegram, reading only: "Noblesse oblige."

In 1927, his remains were transferred to the Hohenzollern family crypt at Klein Glienicke, Potsdam, Berlin, Germany.

== Regimental commissions ==
- 1. Garderegiment zu Fuß (1st Regiment of Foot Guards), Leutnant à la suite from 1903; Leutnant by 1908.
- Fliegerabteilung (Artillerie) 258 (artillery aerial observer squadron), squadron commander, 1917.

== Chivalric orders ==
- Knight, Order of the Black Eagle, 1903
- Knight Grand Cross (with Crown), Order of the Red Eagle, 1903
- Knight, First Class, Prussian Crown Order, 1903
- Knight Grand Commander, Royal House Order of Hohenzollern, ca 1903

== Military decorations (1914–1917) ==
- Iron Cross, Second Class
- Iron Cross, First Class
- Flugzeugführerabzeichen (Pilot's qualification badge), ca. 1917

== Gallery ==
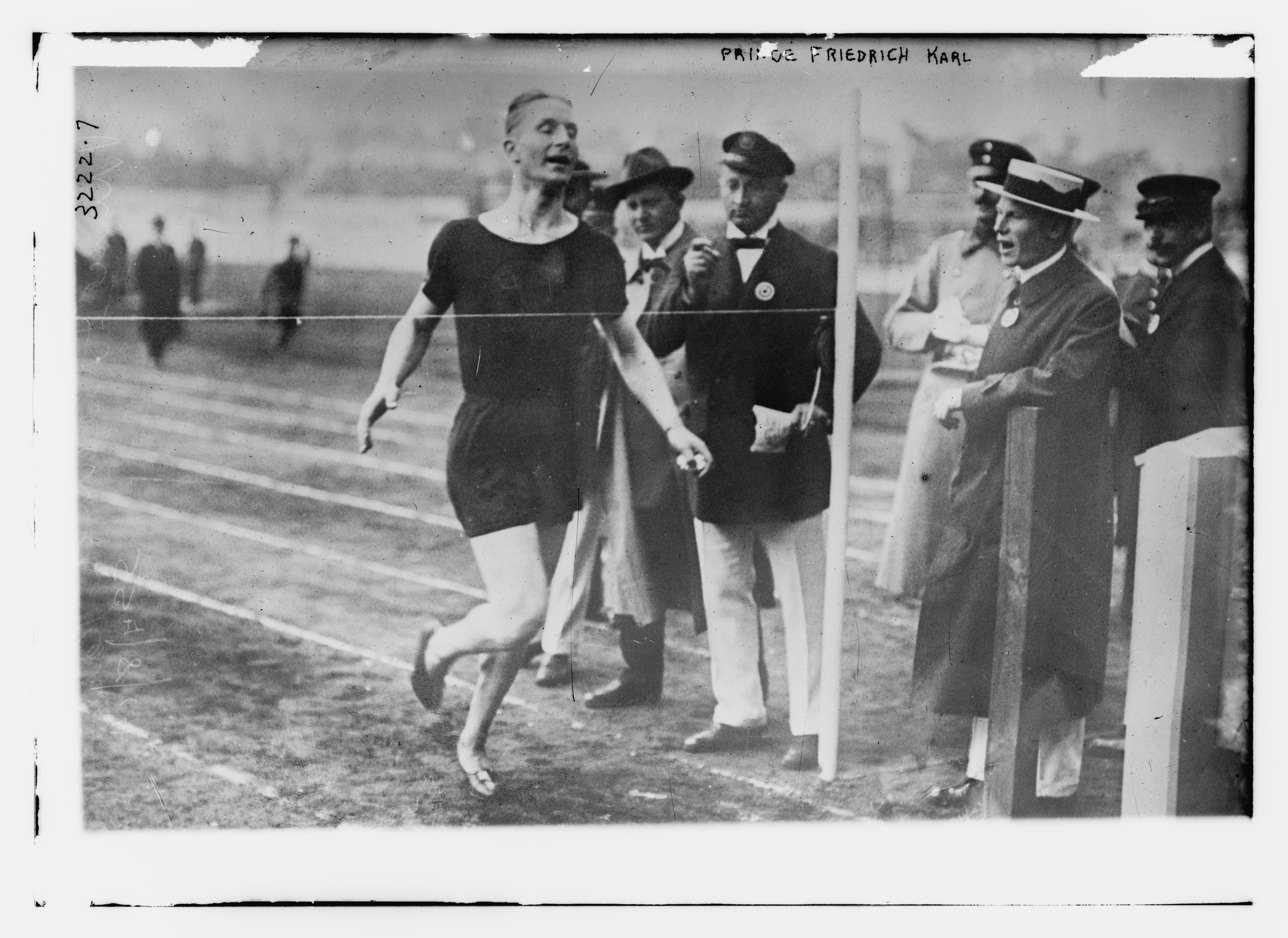
Prince Friedrich Karl running (1910)

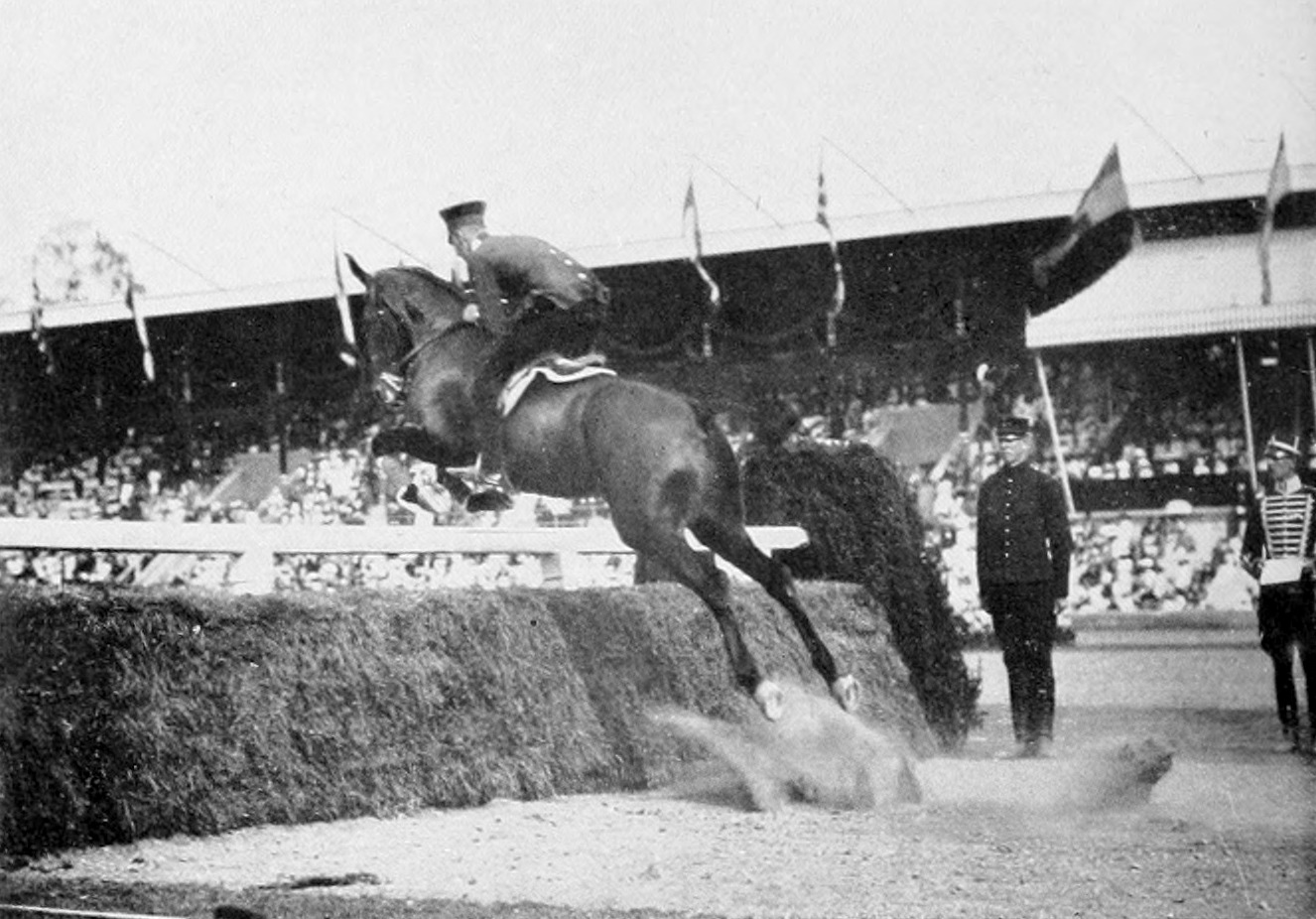
Prince Friedrich Karl of Prussia at the 1912 Summer Olympics

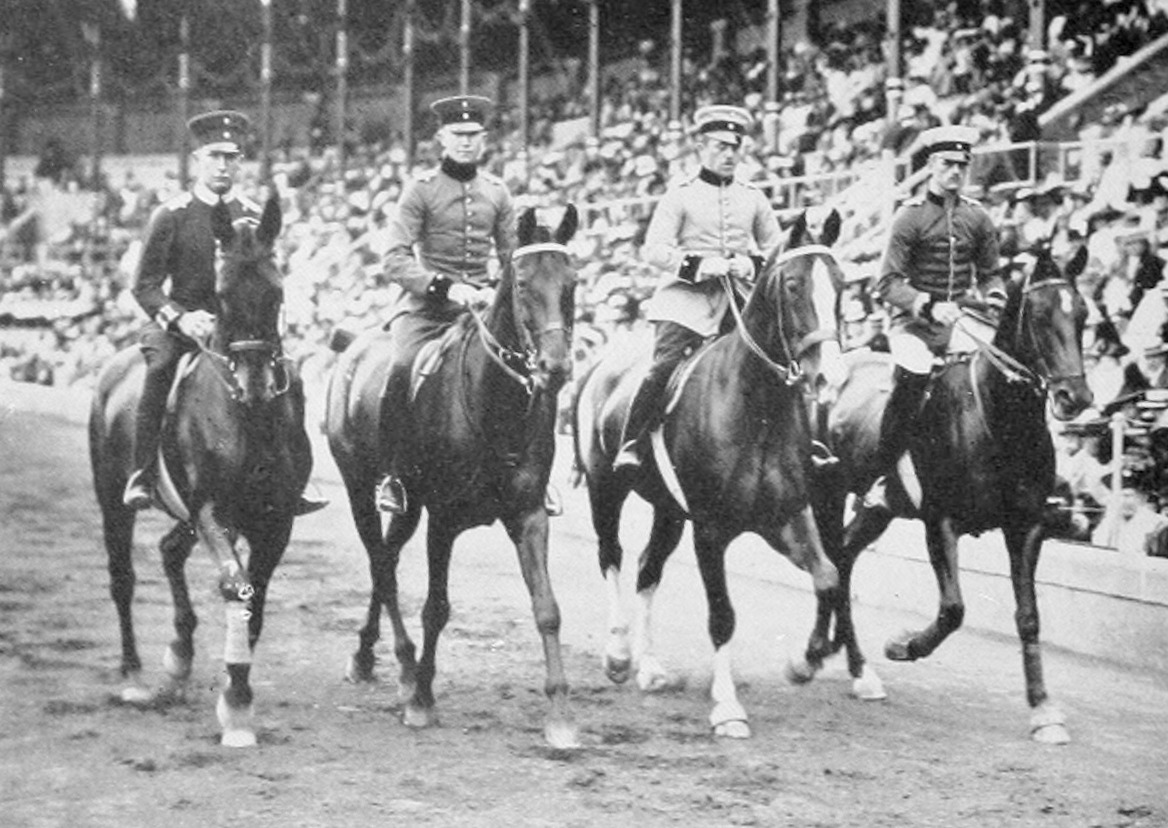
Prince Friedrich Karl and his equastrian team (1912)

== Ancestry ==
Ancestors of Prince Friedrich Karl of Prussia (1893–1917)

16. Frederick William III of Prussia
8. Prince Charles of Prussia
17. Louise of Mecklenburg-Strelitz
4. Prince Friedrich Karl of Prussia
18. Charles Frederick, Grand Duke of Saxe-Weimar-Eisenach
9. Princess Marie of Saxe-Weimar-Eisenach
19. Grand Duchess Maria Pavlovna of Russia
2. Prince Friedrich Leopold of Prussia
20. Leopold III, Duke of Anhalt-Dessau
10. Leopold IV, Duke of Anhalt
21. Margravine Louise of Brandenburg-Schwedt
5. Princess Maria Anna of Anhalt-Dessau
22. Prince Louis Charles of Prussia
11. Princess Frederica of Prussia, Duchess of Anhalt-Dessau
23. Frederica of Mecklenburg-Strelitz
1. Prince Friedrich Karl of Prussia
24. Frederick Christian II, Duke of Schleswig-Holstein-Sonderburg-Augustenburg
12. Christian August II, Duke of Schleswig-Holstein-Sonderburg-Augustenburg
25. Princess Louise Auguste of Denmark
6. Frederick VIII, Duke of Schleswig-Holstein
26. Christian Conrad, Count of Danneskiold-Samsøe
13. Countess Louise Sophie of Danneskiold-Samsøe
27. Johanne Henriette Valentine Kaas af Mur
3. Princess Louise Sophie of Schleswig-Holstein-Sonderburg-Augustenburg
28. Karl Ludwig, Prince of Hohenlohe-Langenburg
14. Ernst I, Prince of Hohenlohe-Langenburg
29. Countess Amalie Henriette of Solms-Baruth
7. Princess Adelheid of Hohenlohe-Langenburg
30. Emich Carl, Prince of Leiningen
15. Princess Feodora of Leiningen
31. Princess Victoria of Saxe-Coburg-Saalfeld

== See also ==
- List of Olympians killed in World War I
