= Princess Sophie of the Netherlands =

Grand Duchess of Saxe-Weimar-Eisenach from 1853 to 1897

Sophie of the Netherlands
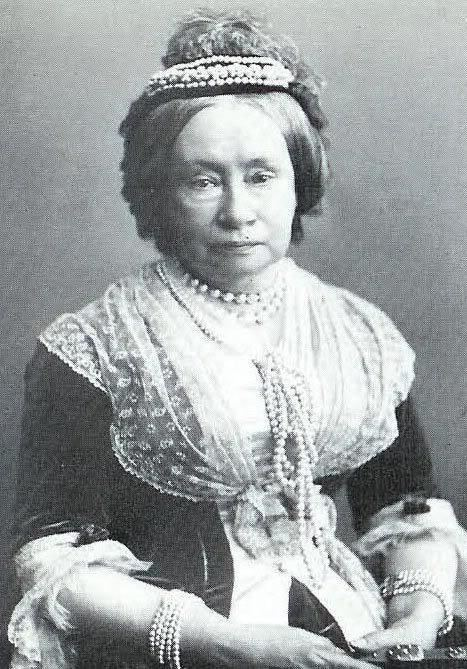

Grand Duchess consort of Saxe-Weimar-Eisenach
- Tenure: 8 July 1853 – 23 March 1897
- Born: 8 April 1824; Lange Voorhout Palace, The Hague, Netherlands
- Died: 23 March 1897 (aged 72); Weimar, German Empire
- Spouse: Charles Alexander, Grand Duke of Saxe-Weimar-Eisenach (m. 1842)
- Issue: Charles Augustus, Hereditary Grand Duke of Saxe-Weimar-Eisenach; Marie, Princess Heinrich VII Reuss; Princess Anna Sophia; Elisabeth, Duchess Johann Albrecht of Mecklenburg
Names
- Wilhelmina Marie Sophie Louise
- House: Orange-Nassau
- Father: William II of the Netherlands
- Mother: Anna Pavlovna of Russia

Princess Sophie of the Netherlands (Wilhelmine Marie Sophie Louise; 8 April 1824 – 23 March 1897) was the only daughter and last surviving child of King William II of the Netherlands and Grand Duchess Anna Pavlovna of Russia. She was heiress presumptive to her niece, Queen Wilhelmina of the Netherlands, for seven years, from the death of her brother until her own death.

== Marriage and children ==
Princess Sophie married her first cousin, Charles Alexander, Hereditary Grand Duke of Saxe-Weimar-Eisenach, at Kneuterdijk Palace in The Hague on 8 October 1842. Their mothers were sisters, and daughters of Tsar Paul I of Russia.

They had four children:

- Karl August, Hereditary Grand Duke of Saxe-Weimar-Eisenach (b. Weimar, 31 July 1844 – d. Cap Martin, France, 20 November 1894), who married Princess Pauline of Saxe-Weimar-Eisenach.
- Princess Marie Alexandrine of Saxe-Weimar-Eisenach (b. Weimar, 20 January 1849 – d. Trebschen, 6 May 1922), who married Prince Heinrich VII Reuss.
- Maria Anna Sophia Elisabeth Bernhardine Ida Auguste Helene of Saxe-Weimar-Eisenach (b. Weimar, 29 March 1851 – d. Weimar, 26 April 1859)
- Princess Elisabeth Sybille of Saxe-Weimar-Eisenach (b. Weimar, 28 February 1854 – d. Wiligrad, 10 July 1908), who married Duke Johann Albrecht of Mecklenburg-Schwerin.

Catherine Radziwill, a contemporary of Sophie's, commented that,

"[Sophie] was very different from her husband, and, though extremely ugly, was a most imposing Princess. She was clever, too, and upheld the reputation of the Weimar family. She was a Princess of the Netherlands by birth...and kept and maintained at her court the traditions in which she had been reared. Notwithstanding her want of beauty, moreover, she presented a splendid figure, being always magnificently dressed and covered with wonderful jewels, among which shone a parure of rubies and diamonds that were supposed to be the finest of their kind in Europe".

In 1872, her sister-in-law, Queen Sophie, wrote:

The Grand Duchess of Weimar, Princess Sophie, is here. She is perfectly hideous, with such a smell you cannot come near her. Then, that small bundle of greasy fat imitates her mother’s ways and manners, which is extremely ridiculous, and I sit and listen as to the ghost of Queen Anna, returned to tease and annoy.

In 1885, Sophie became the sole heir to the Goethe estate, after his last living descendant died. She made his writings accessible to the public in the Weimar Edition.

On 22 March 1897, Sophie fell ill with a cold, and died suddenly the following day from heart failure.

Princess Sophie of the Netherlands House of Orange-Nassau Cadet branch of the House of Nassau Born: 8 April 1824 Died: 23 March 1897
German royalty
Preceded by Maria Pavlovna of Russia	Grand Duchess consort of Saxe-Weimar; 8 July 1853 – 23 March 1897	Vacant Title next held by Caroline Reuss of Greiz
