= Duchess Sophia Charlotte of Oldenburg =

- Princess Eitel Friedrich of Prussia
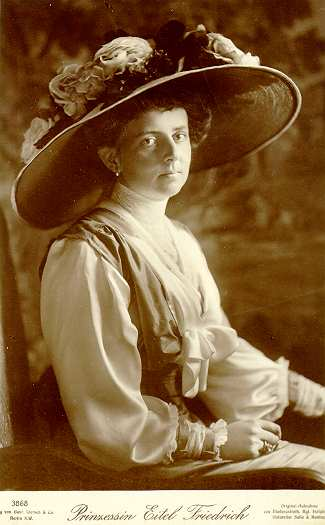
- A photograph of Sophia Charlotte, 1913.
- Born: 2 February 1879; Oldenburg Castle, Grand Duchy of Oldenburg, German Empire
- Died: 29 March 1964 (aged 85); Westerstede, Lower Saxony, West Germany
- Spouse: Prince Eitel Friedrich of Prussia (m. 1906; div. 1926) Harald von Hedemann (m. 1927)
Names
- German: Sophie Charlotte
- House: Holstein-Gottorp
- Father: Frederick Augustus II, Grand Duke of Oldenburg
- Mother: Princess Elisabeth Anna of Prussia

Duchess Sophia Charlotte of Oldenburg (German: Sophie Charlotte; 2 February 1879 – 29 March 1964) was a member of the House of Holstein-Gottorp. She was the only surviving child of Frederick Augustus II, Grand Duke of Oldenburg by his first wife Princess Elisabeth Anna of Prussia.

Sophia Charlotte ("Lotte") is best known for her unhappy and well-publicized marriage to Prince Eitel Friedrich, second son of Wilhelm II, German Emperor. The marriage later led to divorce; Sophia Charlotte would remarry a few years later to Harald van Hedemann, a former police officer.

== Family and early life ==
Sophia Charlotte (or "Lotte") was born on 2 February 1879 in the dynastic residence Oldenburg Castle in Oldenburg, Germany. She was the eldest child of Frederick Augustus, the then Hereditary Grand Duke of the Grand Duchy of Oldenburg and his wife Elisabeth Anna of Prussia. Sophia Charlotte had a younger sister named Margaret, but she died young. She was named after Sophia Charlotte of Hanover, the wife of the first Prussian king Frederick I. Sophia Charlotte was her father's constant companion as they went yachting on trips together; due to these trips, she always had a great love of water like her father. She spent much of her girlhood abroad, and often visited her maternal aunt Louise Margaret, Duchess of Connaught and Strathearn, at Bagshot Park in Surrey. She also often stayed with her widowed maternal grandmother Princess Frederick Charles of Prussia in Italy.

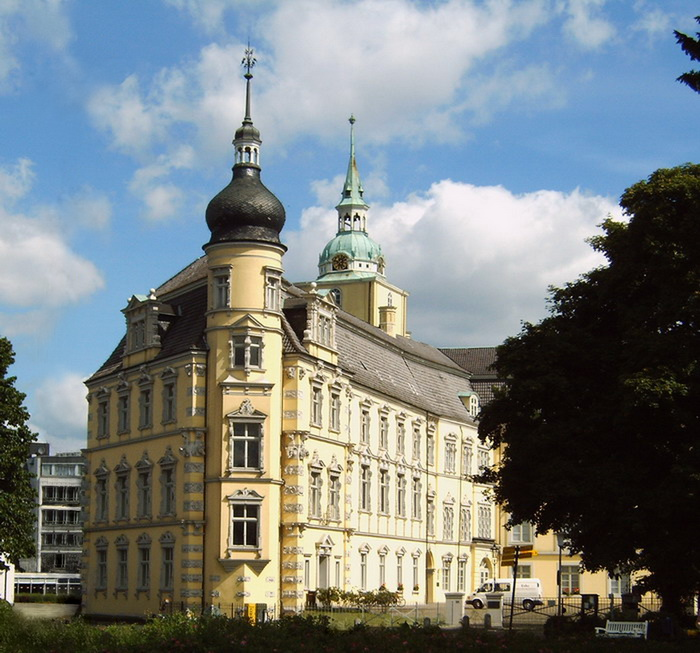
Oldenburg Castle, the place of Sophia Charlotte's birth.

Sophia Charlotte's mother died in 1895, and her father remarried the next year to Duchess Elisabeth Alexandrine of Mecklenburg-Schwerin. This second union gave Sophia Charlotte four half-siblings, which would come to include Nikolaus, Hereditary Grand Duke of Oldenburg and Duchess Altburg, later Hereditary Princess of Waldeck and Pyrmont. They all resided together at the newly built Elisabeth-Anna-Palais (named after her mother). This second marriage made Sophia Charlotte's home life unhappy, and she was glad to escape once a suitable marriage was offered. Her father succeeded as Grand Duke of Oldenburg in 1900.

=== Early press accusations ===
There had always been a fear that Sophia Charlotte had inherited her mother's delicate health, so sojourns to various spa towns was a common component of her childhood. In 1904, a German journalist was sentenced to a month in prison for alluding to the relations between Sophia Charlotte and an adjutant of her father's. He had written an article about her return from a long stay on the Riviera "for her health". He alluded to her "illness" as the same that afflicted two princesses of Mecklenburg-Strelitz, about whose morals there had been much gossip. As these long stays were a common aspect of her childhood, rumours like these were without basis.

=== Initial meetings with Prince Eitel ===
In June 1905, Sophia Charlotte first met Prince Eitel Friedrich of Prussia at the wedding of his brother Crown Prince Wilhelm to Duchess Cecilie of Mecklenburg-Schwerin. They were both sons of Wilhelm II, German Emperor and Augusta Viktoria of Schleswig-Holstein. In Kiel later that month, Sophia Charlotte became better acquainted with him. Eitel's mother in particular desired the match, as she wanted her son to marry one of the Oldenburgs (a family considered quiet, inoffensive, and suitable for a prince). The Oldenburgs were also an ancient family with strong ties to both the Empress and Emperor (as Sophia Charlotte's mother had been a Prussian princess). Her family also had other strong ties to the Hohenzollerns, as Sophia Charlotte's mother had been a great intimate of the Duchess of Saxe-Meiningen, the Emperor's sister. The Duchess was also Sophia Charlotte's godmother, and Sophia Charlotte was herself a favourite of the Emperor. Her closeness to the Prussian court was so pronounced in fact that it had even sparked some early rumours that she would marry Prince Wilhelm instead. Wilhelm had been allowed to choose however, and had settled on Duchess Cecilie.

In September 1905, Eitel traveled to Lensahn, an Oldenburg residence, for several weeks duration. They soon became engaged. The strong pressure on Eitel's side (despite his supposed reluctance), along with the desire of Sophia Charlotte to leave her home, may have been the real cause of their betrothal. There had been many rumours leaking out about Eitel's actions as a soldier, both on the field and off it, so his parents were no doubt eager to see him married off to a seemingly respectable and virtuous bride. One contemporary disparagingly described how the events came about:

"Prince Eitel Fritz, who is his father's favourite, being as tall as he is brutal, and as ferocious as he is fat, took to himself a wife almost by compulsion, and in order to put an end to ugly rumours that were flying about Berlin concerning him and his strange propensities".

== Marriage ==
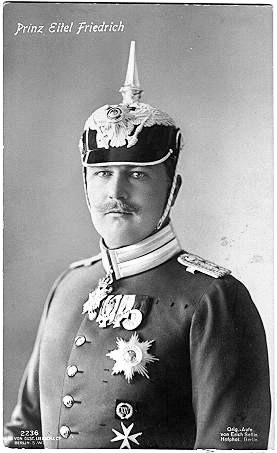
Prince Eitel Friedrich of Prussia in military uniform

On 27 February 1906, Sophia Charlotte married Prince Eitel in Berlin. The wedding fell on the anniversary of the Emperor and Empress's silver wedding, which amplified the event considerably. The wedding had 1,500 guests, which included many members of Germany's royal families. Sophia Charlotte wore a four-yard long dress that was made of pearl white silk and embroidered with silver roses. The wedding had three ceremonies - the signing of the marriage contract under the statutes of the House of Hohenzollern on the first day, the administering of the civil law oaths on the second, and lastly the religious rites in the chapel of the castle later that day. She was warmly welcomed in Berlin.

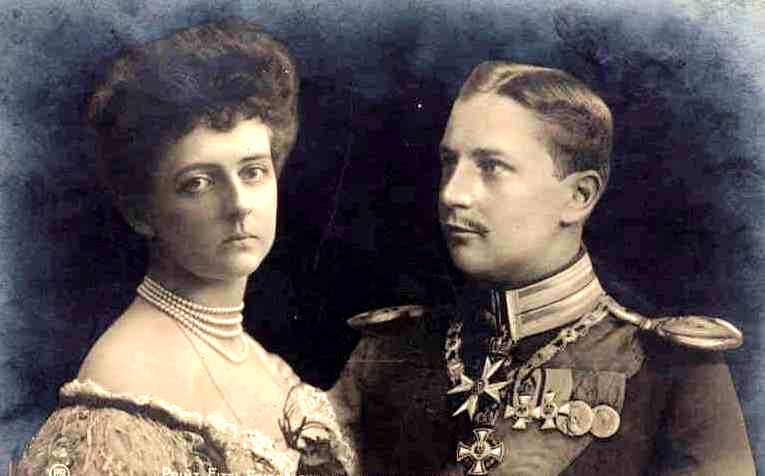
Sophia Charlotte with her first husband Prince Eitel Friedrich, 1910

They had an unhappy marriage. Despite her warm Berlin welcome, Sophia Charlotte failed to make friends there. Eitel was also continually unfaithful. One source states that upon realizing what type of person she had married, Sophia Charlotte "withdrew into a kind of haughty reserve, from which she never emerged". They rarely saw each other during his time fighting in World War I. It was a lonely time for Sophia Charlotte, and she resided mostly in Bellevue Castle in Berlin, where she spent her time mainly reading, painting, and socializing with a small number of friends.

=== Plettenberg case testimony ===
In 1922, Prince Eitel sued four German newspapers over what he considered libelous allegations that his wife had committed adultery. These events began when Sophia Charlotte was summoned as a witness in a divorce case, and apparently admitted to having an affair with the male defendant. In the case, she stated that she had known the defendant for a number of years before her marriage when he served her father in Oldenburg. When asked by the judge, she said "our intimate relations continued even after my marriage with the Kaiser's son". She also added that her husband was aware of the affair the entire time, and that her and Plettenberg's intimate relationship only ceased once he married. Sophia Charlotte later announced however, "I emphatically deny that either before or after have I had any unpermitted relations whatever with the plaintiff. I not only never committed adultery with the plaintiff nor did we ever kiss each other, nor did I maintain any relations whatsoever with him which overstepped the limits permitted by good society". The case was heavily suppressed in German newspapers, so that most reports were published in foreign newspapers.

=== Divorce ===
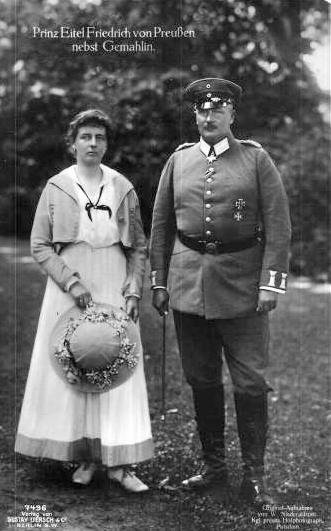
Sophia Charlotte and Eitel in 1925, the year before their divorce.

They were divorced 20 October 1926. The couple had no children. It is believed that the couple had wanted to divorce before the war, but were prevented by Eitel's father. Eitel reportedly began divorce proceedings against Sophia Charlotte on 15 March 1919, citing infidelities before the war. In the end, a verdict given out by the court merely stated that Eitel was the guilty party.

== Later life ==
After many rumors of potential husbands circulated after her divorce (including the aforementioned Baron von Plettenberg), Sophia Charlotte married on 25 September 1927 Harald von Hedemann (22 September 1887 – 12 June 1951), a former Potsdam police officer. He was forty and she was forty-eight. Despite his low status, the wedding was held at the grand ducal palace at Rastede Castle, and was attended by her father the ex-Grand Duke as well as a small number of both their relations. Sophia Charlotte was considered one of the richest women in the country, and the couple took up residence at the same castle where they were married.

Sophia Charlotte died on 29 March 1964 in Westerstede.

== Personal traits and looks ==
Sophia Charlotte was well-educated. She was a linguist and a musician. She was also a water-color painter.

There were concerns of her well-being in Sophia Charlotte's youth, as her mother had suffered from ill health. By traveling to spa resorts and residing in warm weather however, she was able to overcome any signs of sickness. One source stated right before her marriage that Sophia Charlotte had "developed into a thoroughly healthy and happy woman, whose fair hair and blue eyes, so entirely German, are somewhat piquantly associated with a delicacy of feature that suggests the Latin rather than the Teutonic origin". According to another account, Sophia Charlotte was considered slim and graceful with pale, regular features. Contemporaries state she inherited some of the good looks and charm of her mother. As she was the only child of the Grand Duke by his first wife, she was a great heiress. Her wealth was often stressed when mentioned in articles and newspapers. One book called her "pretty, rich, and supposed to be very clever". Another contemporary source however calls her plain and uninteresting.

== Ancestry ==
Ancestors of Duchess Sophia Charlotte of Oldenburg

8. Augustus, Grand Duke of Oldenburg
4. Peter II, Grand Duke of Oldenburg
9. Princess Ida of Anhalt-Bernburg-Schaumburg-Hoym
2. Frederick Augustus II, Grand Duke of Oldenburg
10. Joseph, Duke of Saxe-Altenburg
5. Princess Elisabeth of Saxe-Altenburg
11. Duchess Amelia of Württemberg
1. Duchess Sophia Charlotte of Oldenburg
12. Prince Charles of Prussia
6. Prince Frederick Charles of Prussia
13. Princess Marie of Saxe-Weimar-Eisenach
3. Princess Elisabeth of Prussia
14. Leopold IV, Duke of Anhalt
7. Princess Maria Anna of Anhalt-Dessau
15. Princess Frederica of Prussia

== Sources ==
- Le Queux, William (1918). Love Intrigues of the Kaiser's Sons. New York: John Lane Company. ASIN B000Q9PC62.
- Radziwill, Catherine (1915). The Royal Marriage Market of Europe. New York: Funk and Wagnalls Company. ISBN 1-112-56551-5.
- Schwering, Axel von (1915). The Berlin Court Under William II. London: Cassell and Company, Ltd. ISBN 1-112-10547-6.
