= Princess Elisabeth Anna of Prussia =

Hereditary Grand Duchess of Oldenburg (1857–1895)

Princess Elisabeth
- Hereditary Grand Duchess of Oldenburg
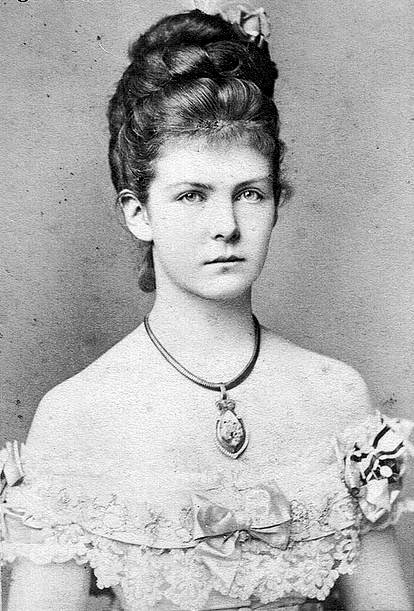
- Elisabeth photographed c. 1880–1889
- Born: 8 February 1857; Potsdam, Kingdom of Prussia
- Died: 28 August 1895 (aged 38); Fulda, Prussia
- Burial: Ducal (Herzogliches) Mausoleum, Gertrudenfriedhof, Oldenburg
- Spouse: Frederick Augustus, Hereditary Grand Duke of Oldenburg (m. 1878)
- Issue: Sophia Charlotte, Princess Eitel Friedrich of Prussia; Duchess Margaret
- House: Hohenzollern
- Father: Prince Frederick Charles of Prussia
- Mother: Princess Maria Anna of Anhalt-Dessau

Princess Elisabeth of Prussia (8 February 1857 – 28 August 1895) was a German princess. She was the second child of Prince Frederick Charles of Prussia and Princess Maria Anna of Anhalt-Dessau. The Elisabeth-Anna-Palais was named in her honor after her early death in 1895.

== Family ==
Elisabeth's father Prince Frederick was the eldest son of Prince Charles of Prussia, who in turn was a younger son of Frederick William III of Prussia. Elisabeth's mother Maria Anna was a daughter of Leopold IV, Duke of Anhalt and Princess Frederica of Prussia, Duchess of Anhalt-Dessau.

Her siblings included Marie, Princess of Saxe-Altenburg, Louise Margaret, Duchess of Connaught and Strathearn, and Prince Friedrich Leopold of Prussia. Through her sister Louise Margaret, Elisabeth Anna was an aunt of Margaret, Crown Princess of Sweden, and consequently was related to both the British and Swedish royal families.

Elisabeth Anna was a godmother to Princess Patricia of Connaught, who was another one of her nieces.

== Marriage ==
On 18 February 1878, Elisabeth Anna married Frederick Augustus, Hereditary Grand Duke of Oldenburg. It was a double wedding, in which Princess Charlotte of Prussia (daughter of the Crown Prince and Crown Princess of Prussia) married Bernhard, Hereditary Prince of Saxe-Meiningen on the same day as Elisabeth Anna in Berlin. The marriages were the first such occasions performed since Prussia had become the German Empire in 1870. Due to this increased status, the weddings were attended by many important personages, including King Leopold II of the Belgians and his wife Queen Marie Henriette. The Prince of Wales also attended, as one of the brides (Charlotte) was his niece. Frederick Augustus was said to be pleased with his beautiful and charming bride, and their marriage was a harmonious one.

Elisabeth Anna and her husband had two daughters:

Name	Birth	Death	Notes
Duchess Sophia Charlotte of Oldenburg	2 February 1879	29 March 1964	married Prince Eitel Friedrich of Prussia, a younger son of Wilhelm II of Germany.
Duchess Margaret of Oldenburg	13 October 1881	20 February 1882	died young.

Elisabeth died on 28 August 1895, before he succeeded as Grand Duke. Before her death, her husband had been building a new residential palace; once she died, Frederick named the new building the Elisabeth-Anna-Palais in her honor. Her husband later married Elisabeth Alexandrine of Mecklenburg-Schwerin, daughter of Frederick Francis II, Grand Duke of Mecklenburg.

== Ancestry ==
Ancestors of Princess Elisabeth Anna of Prussia

8. Frederick William III of Prussia
4. Prince Charles of Prussia
9. Duchess Louise of Mecklenburg-Strelitz
2. Prince Frederick Charles of Prussia
10. Charles Frederick, Grand Duke of Saxe-Weimar-Eisenach
5. Princess Marie of Saxe-Weimar-Eisenach
11. Grand Duchess Maria Pavlovna of Russia
1. Princess Elisabeth of Prussia
12. Frederick, Hereditary Prince of Anhalt-Dessau
6. Leopold IV, Duke of Anhalt
13. Princess Amalie of Hesse-Homburg
3. Princess Maria Anna of Anhalt-Dessau
14. Prince Louis Charles of Prussia
7. Princess Frederica of Prussia
15. Duchess Frederica of Mecklenburg-Strelitz

== Sources ==
- Radziwill, Catherine (1915). Memories of Forty Years. London: Funk & Wagnalls Company.
