= Prince Bertil, Duke of Halland =

Swedish prince (1912–1997)

Prince Bertil
- Duke of Halland
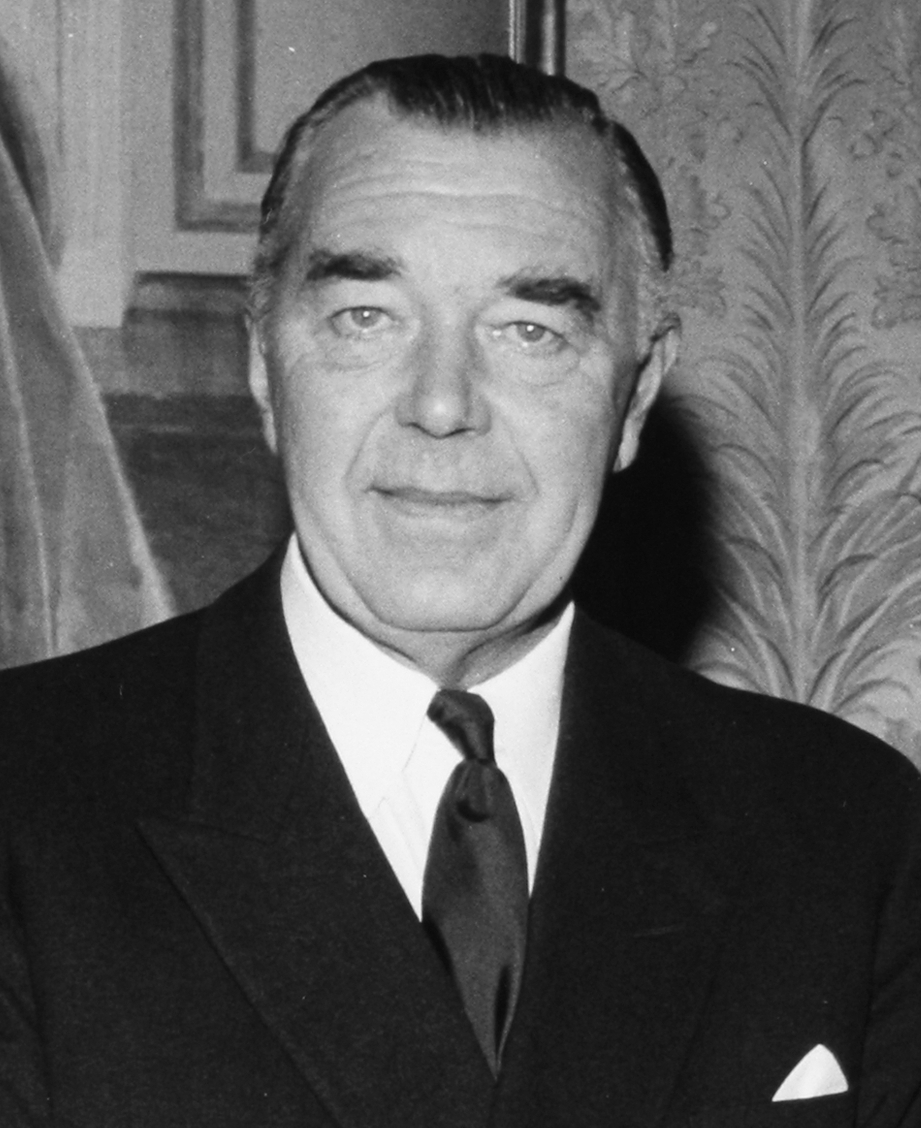
- Prince Bertil in 1967
- Born: 28 February 1912; The Royal Palace, Stockholm, Sweden
- Died: 5 January 1997 (aged 84); Villa Solbacken, Djurgården, Stockholm, Sweden
- Burial: 13 January 1997; Royal Cemetery, Solna, Sweden
- Spouse: Lilian Davies (m. 1976)
Names
- Bertil Gustaf Oskar Carl Eugén
- House: Bernadotte
- Father: Gustaf VI Adolf
- Mother: Margaret of Connaught

Prince Bertil of Sweden, Duke of Halland (Bertil Gustaf Oskar Carl Eugén; 28 February 1912 – 5 January 1997), was a member of the Swedish royal family. He was the third son of King Gustaf VI Adolf and his first wife, Princess Margaret of Connaught, as well as the uncle of King Carl XVI Gustaf. From 1973 to 1979, he was heir presumptive to his nephew Carl XVI Gustaf and the Swedish throne.

== Early life ==
Bertil was born on 28 February 1912 at Stockholm, as the fourth of five children born to Princess Margaret of Connaught and Crown Prince Gustaf Adolf of Sweden. His siblings included: Prince Gustaf Adolf, Duke of Vasterbotten, Prince Sigvard, Duke of Uppland, Princess Ingrid and Prince Carl Johan, Duke of Dalarna.

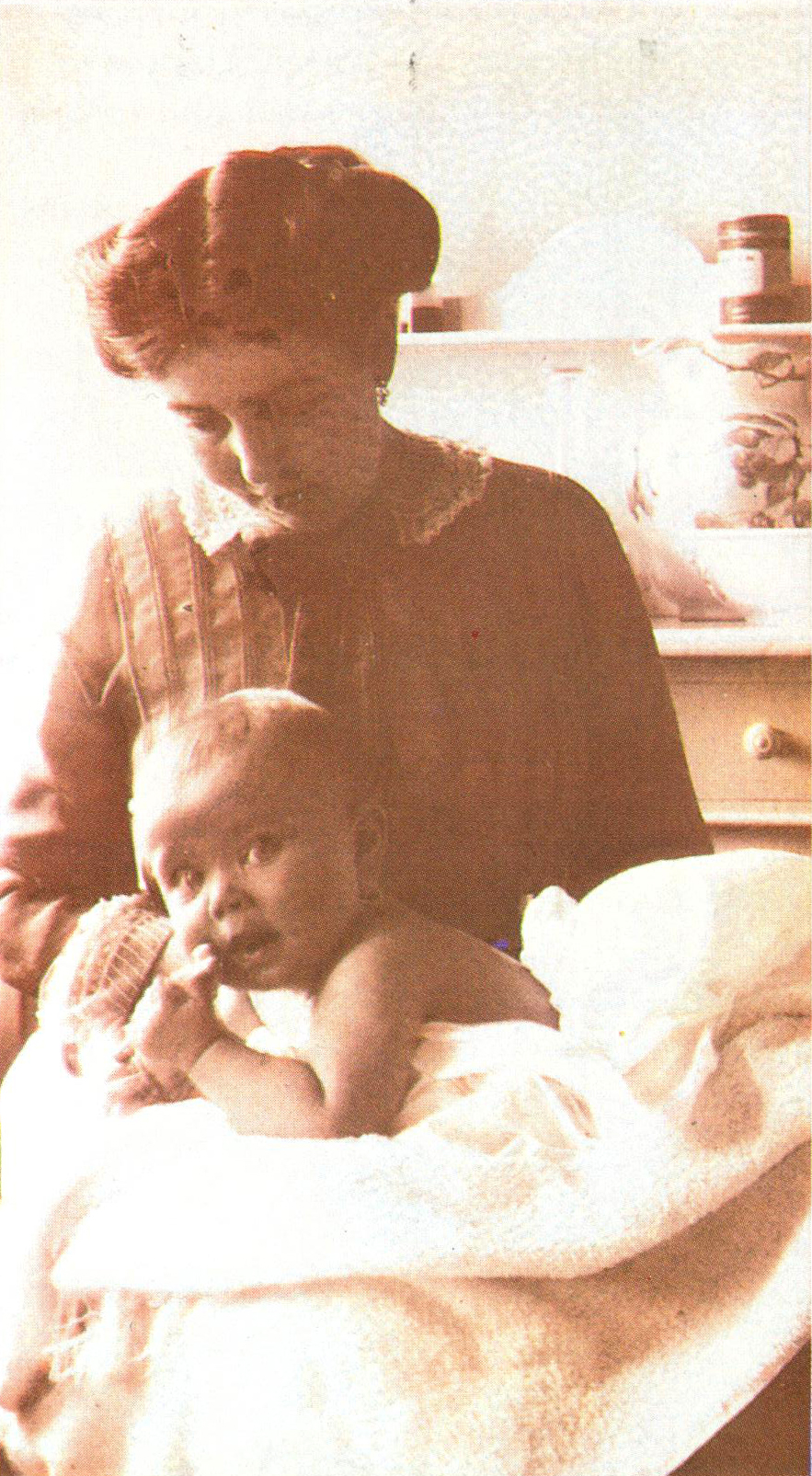
Bertil with his mother, Princess Margaret of Connaught, in 1912.

The family lived in apartments at Stockholm Palace in Stockholm, at Ulriksdal Palace near the capital in Ulriksdal and at the summer residence: Sofiero Palace in Helsingborg in the southernmost province of Sweden, Scania.

== Royal role ==
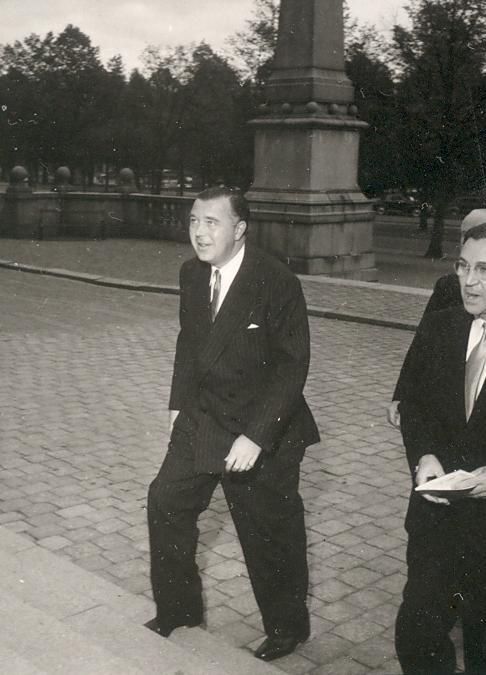
Bertil arrives for an event at the Nordic Museum about 1950

Bertil was granted a very old dukedom, one that was bestowed in the Middle Ages on various Danish and Swedish royal relatives. After his eldest brother, Prince Gustaf Adolf, died in 1947, leaving an infant son, Prince Carl Gustaf, in the line of succession, and because his elder brother Sigvard had already given up his place in the succession (owing to a constitutionally unacceptable marriage), it seemed likely that Bertil could one day become regent. After Carl Gustaf became king, Bertil remained the next in line to the throne (until the birth of Prince Carl Philip in 1979), and continued to act as the King's deputy.

When the Act of Succession was changed in 1980, rights to the throne were restricted to Carl XVI Gustaf and his descendants; however, a special addendum was made for Bertil's case, so that he became third (and, after the birth of Princess Madeleine in 1982, fourth) in line to the throne.

== Personal life ==
Bertil became a naval officer; and, during the Second World War, he served as Swedish naval attaché at the embassy in London.

In 1943, Bertil met his long-term partner, Welsh commoner Lilian Craig. However, in order to preserve his place in the royal succession, Bertil and Lilian did not marry for decades. They lived together discreetly, as a fully private arrangement, from the 1940s until their marriage was announced and took place in 1976. Their common base was a home in Sainte-Maxime, in the south of France.

Since his life with Craig was not official, Prince Bertil's single status meant he was suggested as a match for, among others, Princess Margaret of the United Kingdom. After the death of Gustaf VI Adolf in 1973, the new king, Carl XVI Gustaf, married a non-royal woman and approved the marriage of Bertil and Lilian, which took place at Drottningholm Palace on 7 December 1976.

Bertil was fond of cars, owning a rare Aston Martin DB2, a Chevrolet Corvette and a 1926 Bugatti Type 35 Grand Prix. Volvo asked him to open the Volvo Halifax Assembly plant in 1963 in Nova Scotia, Canada. A parking garage in Sainte-Maxime is named after him.

Prince Bertil was a keen supporter and practitioner of various sports, notably tennis and boules. In 1947, he was elected Chairman of both the Swedish Sports Confederation and Sweden's Olympic Committee. He was also a member of the fine-dining society La Chaine des Rotisseurs.

He died at his home the Villa Solbacken in Stockholm in 1997, with Princess Lilian at his side. Their grave is at the Royal Cemetery in Haga Park.

== Military ranks ==
- (Sweden) 4 October 1934: Acting sub-lieutenant
- (Sweden) 1936: Underlöjtnant
- (Sweden) 1937: Sub-lieutenant
- (Sweden) 13 February 1942: Lieutenant
- (Sweden) 1 April 1948: Lieutenant commander
- (Sweden) ????: Commander
- (Sweden) 1952: Captain
- (Sweden) 1956: Rear admiral
- (Sweden) 1956: Major general in the Army
- (Sweden) 1956: Major general in the Air Force
- (Sweden) 17 October 1969: Admiral
- (Sweden) 17 October 1969: General in the Army
- (Sweden) 17 October 1969: General in the Air Force

== Titles, honours and arms ==
=== National honours ===
- Knight of the Royal Order of the Seraphim (1912)
- Commander Grand Cross of the Order of the Sword (1912)
- Commander Grand Cross of the Order of the Polar Star (1912)
- Knight of the Order of Charles XIII (1912)
- Commander Grand Cross of the Order of Vasa (28 February 1952)
- Recipient of the King Gustaf V's Jubilee Commemorative Medal (1928)
- Recipient of the King Gustaf V's Jubilee Commemorative Medal (1948)
- Recipient of the King Gustaf VI Adolf's Commemorative Medal (1967)
- Recipient of the Illis quorum in gold of 18th size with chain (1969)
- Recipient of the H. M. The King's Medal, 12th size gold medal with diamonds worn around the neck on a chain of gold (silver-gilt) (1987)
- Recipient of the King Carl XVI Gustaf's Jubilee Commemorative Medal I (1996)

=== Foreign honours ===
- Argentina: Grand Cross of the Order of the Liberator General San Martín (18 May 1998)
- Austria: Grand Decoration of Honour in Gold with Sash for Services to the Republic of Austria (1960)
- Belgium: Grand Cordon of the Order of Leopold
- Chile:
  - Grand Cross of the Order of Merit
  - Grand Cross of the Order of Bernardo O'Higgins
- Colombia: Grand Cross of the Order of Boyaca
- Denmark: Knight of the Order of the Elephant
- Egypt: Grand Cross of the Order of Muhammad Ali
- Estonia: First Class of the Order of the Cross of Terra Mariana
- Ethiopia:
  - Grand Cross of the Order of Solomon
  - Grand Cross of the Order of Menelik II
- Finland: Grand Cross of the Order of the White Rose of Finland
- France: Grand Cross of the Legion of Honour
- Germany: Grand Cross 1st class of the Order of Merit of the Federal Republic of Germany
- Iraq: First Class of the Order of the Two Rivers
- Iran:
  - Second Class of the Order of Pahlavi
  - Knight Grand Cordon of the Order of the Crown
- Iceland: Grand Cross of the Order of the Falcon
- Italy: Knight Grand Cross of the Order of Merit of the Italian Republic
- Japan: Grand Cordon of the Order of the Chrysanthemum
- Mexico: Grand Cross of the Order of the Aztec Eagle
- Netherlands: Knight Grand Cross of the Order of the Netherlands Lion
- Norway:
  - Grand Cross with Collar of the Order of St. Olav (23 March 1953)
  - Grand Cross of the Order of St. Olav (1 March 1952)
- Peru: Grand Cross of the Order of the Sun of Peru
- Portugal: Grand Cross of the Order of Christ
- Saxe-Coburg-Gotha: Grand Cross of the Saxe-Ernestine House Order
- Spain: Grand Cross of the Order of Charles III (15 October 1979)
- Thailand: Knight of the Order of the Royal House of Chakri (21 September 1960)
- United Kingdom: Honorary Knight Grand Cross of the Order of the Bath (June 1956)
- United States: Commander of the Legion of Merit (4 June 1948)
- Venezuela: Grand Cordon of the Order of the Liberator
- Yugoslavia: Recipient of the Order of the Yugoslav Great Star (29 March 1976)

=== Title ===
- 1912-1997: His Royal Highness Prince Bertil of Sweden, Duke of Halland

=== Arms ===
Bertil's coat of arms

On his creation as Duke of Halland, Prince Bertil was granted use of a coat of arms based on the Arms of Dominion of Sweden, with the arms of Halland in the third quarter.

=== Monogram ===
Bertil's monogram

== Ancestry ==
Ancestors of Prince Bertil, Duke of Halland

8. Oscar II
4. Gustaf V
9. Princess Sophia of Nassau
2. Gustaf VI Adolf
10. Frederick I, Grand Duke of Baden
5. Princess Victoria of Baden
11. Princess Louise of Prussia
1. Prince Bertil, Duke of Halland
12. Prince Albert of Saxe-Coburg and Gotha
6. Prince Arthur, Duke of Connaught and Strathearn
13. Victoria of the United Kingdom
3. Princess Margaret of Connaught
14. Prince Friedrich Karl of Prussia
7. Princess Louise Margaret of Prussia
15. Princess Maria Anna of Anhalt-Dessau

Prince Bertil House of Bernadotte Born: 28 February 1912 Died: 5 January 1997
| Preceded by Bengt Algotsson | Duke of Halland; 1912–1997 | Vacant Title next held by Prince Julian |
