= Princess Margaret of Connaught =

Crown Princess of Sweden (1882–1920)

Margaret of Connaught
- Crown Princess of Sweden; Duchess of Scania
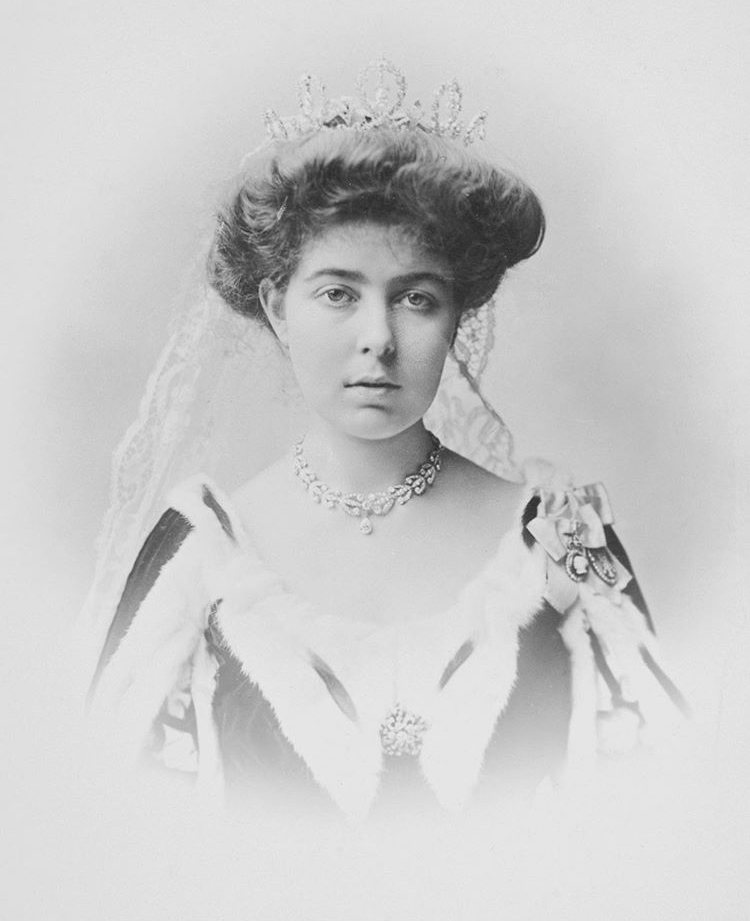
- Margaret in 1905
- Born: 15 January 1882; Bagshot Park, Surrey, England
- Died: 1 May 1920 (aged 38); The Royal Palace, Stockholm, Sweden
- Burial: 10 May 1920; Royal Cemetery, Solna, Sweden
- Spouse: Gustaf Adolf, Crown Prince of Sweden (later Gustaf VI Adolf) (m. 1905)
- Issue: Prince Gustaf Adolf, Duke of Västerbotten; Sigvard Bernadotte; Ingrid, Queen of Denmark; Prince Bertil, Duke of Halland; Carl Johan Bernadotte
Names
- Margaret Victoria Charlotte Augusta Norah
- House: Saxe-Coburg and Gotha (Note: The British part of the House of Saxe-Coburg and Gotha, to which Margaret belonged, later changed its name to Windsor.)
- Father: Prince Arthur, Duke of Connaught and Strathearn
- Mother: Princess Louise Margaret of Prussia

Princess Margaret of Connaught (Swedish: Margareta; (Note: Från blomstergården (From the Flower Garden), a book by Margareta kronprinsessa av Sverige published by Norstedts in 1917.) Margaret Victoria Charlotte Augusta Norah; 15 January 1882 – 1 May 1920) was Crown Princess of Sweden as the first wife of the future King Gustaf VI Adolf. She died 30 years before her husband ascended the throne as King of Sweden, so she never became queen.

A granddaughter of Queen Victoria, she was the first of the three children born to Prince Arthur, Duke of Connaught, third son of the queen, and Princess Louise Margaret of Prussia. She and her future husband met while she and her family were travelling in Cairo; however, even though her younger sister, Patricia, was the one proposed for marriage to Gustaf Adolf, he and Margaret fell in love at first sight.

After they married in 1905, the couple spent their honeymoon in Ireland before arriving in Sweden. Their marriage was described as very happy and it produced five children. After Gustaf Adolf's grandfather, Oscar II, died little more than two years after Norway became independent from Sweden, Gustaf Adolf's father Gustaf V ascended the throne, and thus he and Margaret became Crown Prince and Princess of Sweden.

At some point in 1920, Margaret, pregnant with her sixth child, contracted chickenpox, which developed into mastoiditis. After undergoing surgery to have it removed, she began suffering from pain under her eye, and was subjected to another surgery by doctors. Following the procedure, she contracted erysipelas, and by the next day, "blood poisoning" (sepsis), from which she died within hours. Her husband remarried, to Louise Mountbatten, three years after her death.

One of Margaret's children was Ingrid of Sweden, the mother of Queen Margrethe II of Denmark and Queen Anne-Marie of Greece. Another of her children was Prince Gustaf Adolf, Duke of Västerbotten, father of King Carl XVI Gustaf of Sweden.

== Early life ==
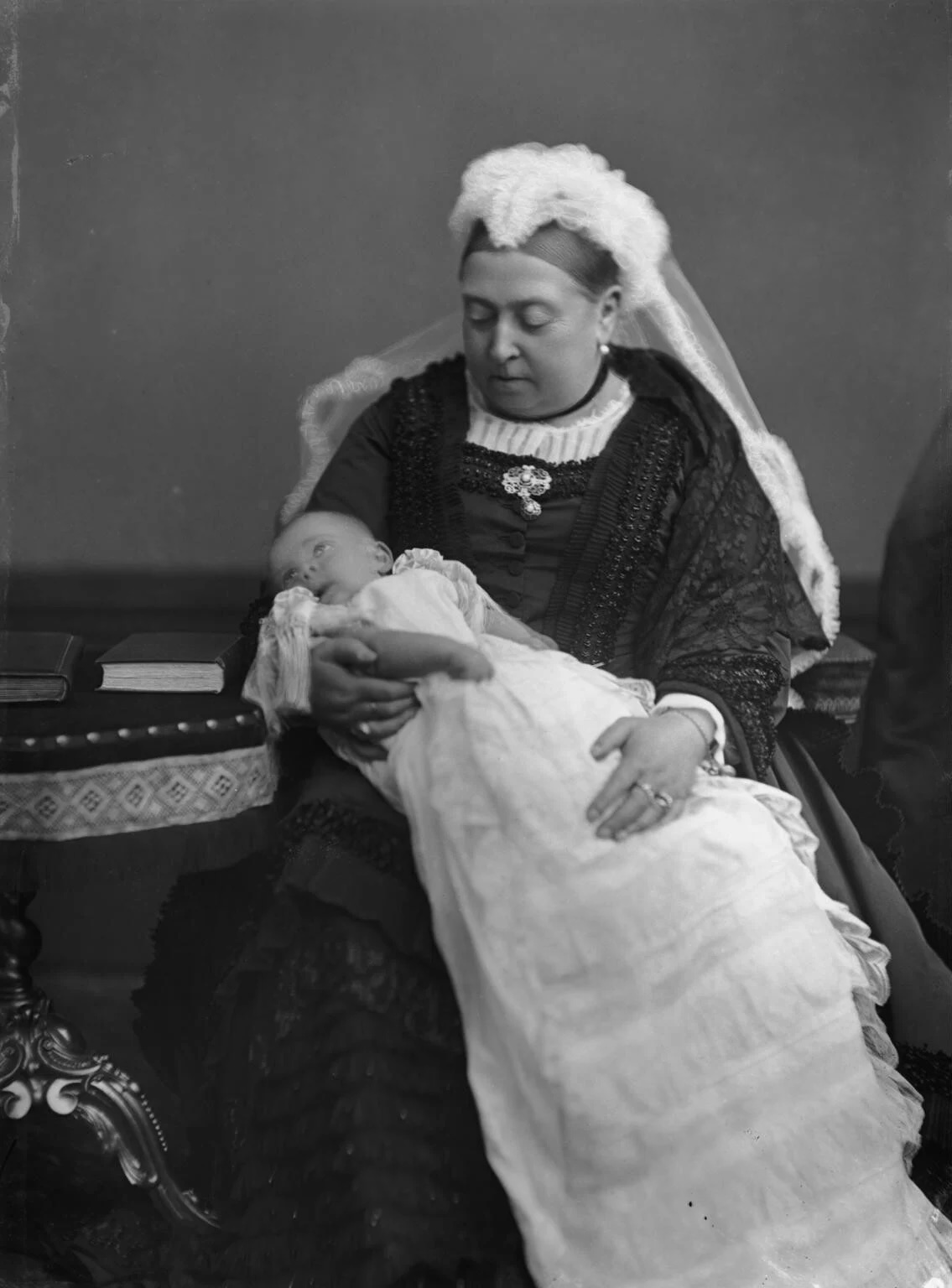
The newborn Princess Margaret with her grandmother Queen Victoria in May 1882

Margaret was born on 15 January 1882 at Bagshot Park and baptised in the Private Chapel of Windsor Castle on 11 March by the Archbishop of Canterbury. Her godparents were Queen Victoria (her paternal grandmother); the German Emperor (her maternal great-granduncle, who was represented by the German Ambassador, Count Münster); the German Crown Princess (her paternal aunt, who was represented by her sister, Princess Christian of Schleswig-Holstein); Prince and Princess Friedrich Karl of Prussia (her maternal grandparents, for whom her paternal uncle the Duke of Edinburgh and aunt Princess Beatrice of the United Kingdom stood proxy); the Duchess of Cambridge (her paternal great-grandaunt, who was represented by her grandniece Princess Louise, Duchess of Argyll); the Prince of Wales (her paternal uncle) and Prince Charles of Prussia (her great-grandfather, for whom her paternal uncle Prince Leopold, Duke of Albany stood proxy). She was known as "Daisy" to her family, a nickname later passed down to her granddaughter Queen Margrethe II of Denmark.

Princess Margaret's coronet, used at Edward VII's coronation in 1902. Kept at Livrustkammaren in Stockholm.

Margaret grew up as a member of the British royal family, taking part in family holidays and weddings. She was a bridesmaid along with her sister at the wedding of their paternal cousins the Duke and Duchess of York on 6 July 1893. Margaret was confirmed in March 1898, also in the Private Chapel of Windsor Castle.

== Marriage ==
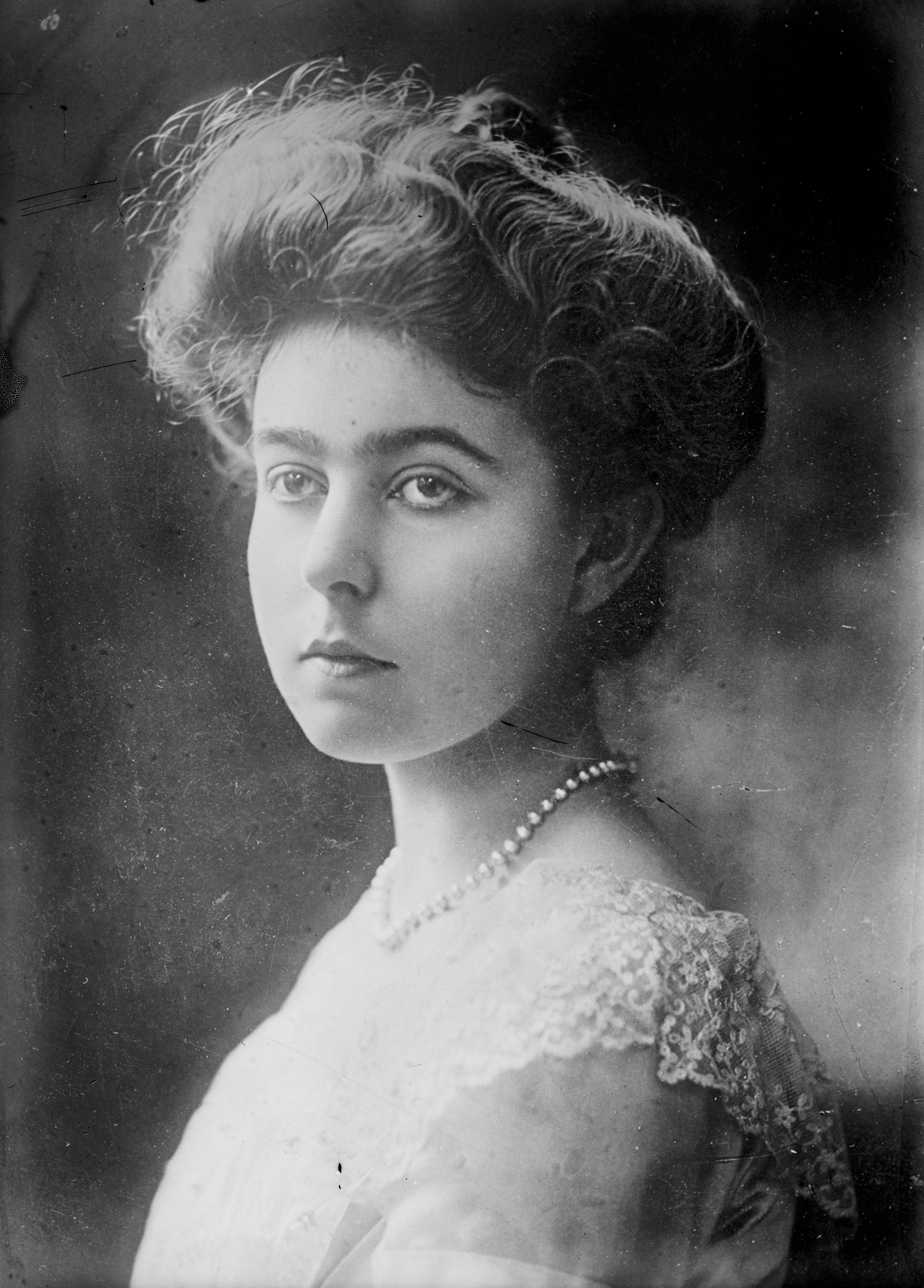
Princess Margaret at the start of the 1900s

When Margaret was 23 and her younger sister Princess Patricia of Connaught was 18, both girls were among the most beautiful and eligible princesses in Europe. Their uncle, Edward VII, wanted his nieces to marry a European king or crown prince. In 1902, Princess Beatrice of Bourbon tried to convince her brother Jaime to propose to Margaret. In January 1905, the Duke and Duchess of Connaught visited Portugal, where they were received by King Carlos and his wife, Amélie of Orléans, whose sons, Luís Filipe, Duke of Braganza, and Prince Manuel, entertained the young British princesses. The Portuguese expected one of the Connaught princesses would become the future Queen of Portugal.

The Connaughts continued their trip to Egypt and Sudan. In Cairo, they met Prince Gustaf Adolf of Sweden, the future Gustaf VI Adolf of Sweden, grandson of the Swedish King Oscar II. Originally, Margaret's sister Patricia had been considered a suitable match for Gustaf Adolf; without his knowledge, a meeting was arranged with the two sisters. Gustaf Adolf and Margaret fell in love at first sight; he proposed at a dinner held by Lord Cromer at the British Consulate in Egypt and was accepted. Margaret's parents were very happy with the match.

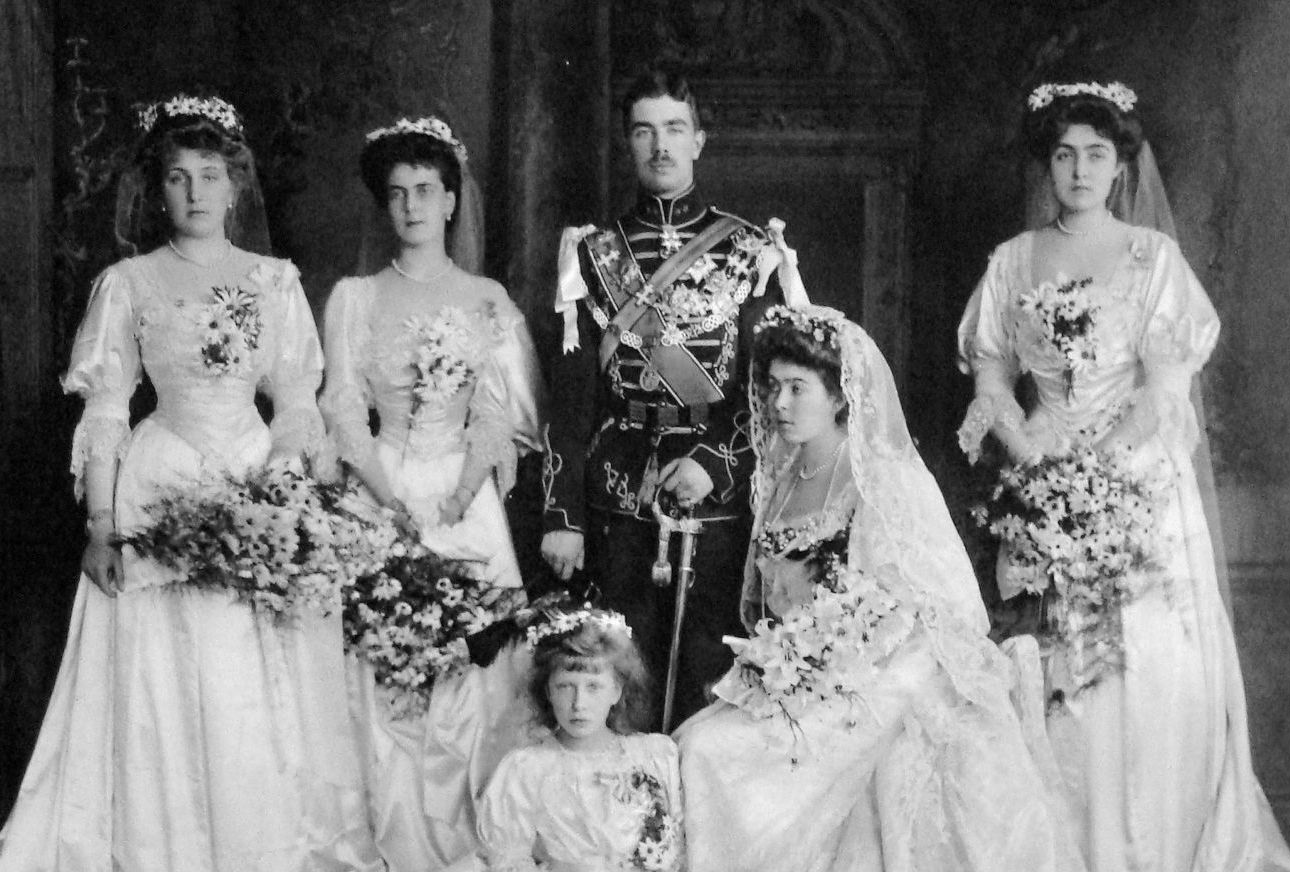
Wedding of Princess Margaret and Prince Gustaf Adolf in 1905

Gustaf Adolf and Margaret married on 15 June 1905 in St. George's Chapel at Windsor Castle. Margaret's bridesmaids were her sister Princess Patricia of Connaught, cousins Princess Beatrice of Saxe-Coburg and Gotha and Princess Victoria Eugenie of Battenberg, and first cousin once removed Princess Mary of Wales. The couple spent their honeymoon at Adare Manor in County Limerick, Ireland, and arrived in Sweden on 8 July 1905.

One of Margaret's wedding presents was the Connaught tiara, which remains in the Swedish royal jewellery collection today. Newspaper articles reporting on the valuation of her mother's estate for Probate in 1917 note that Margaret received a £25,000 marriage settlement from her parents.

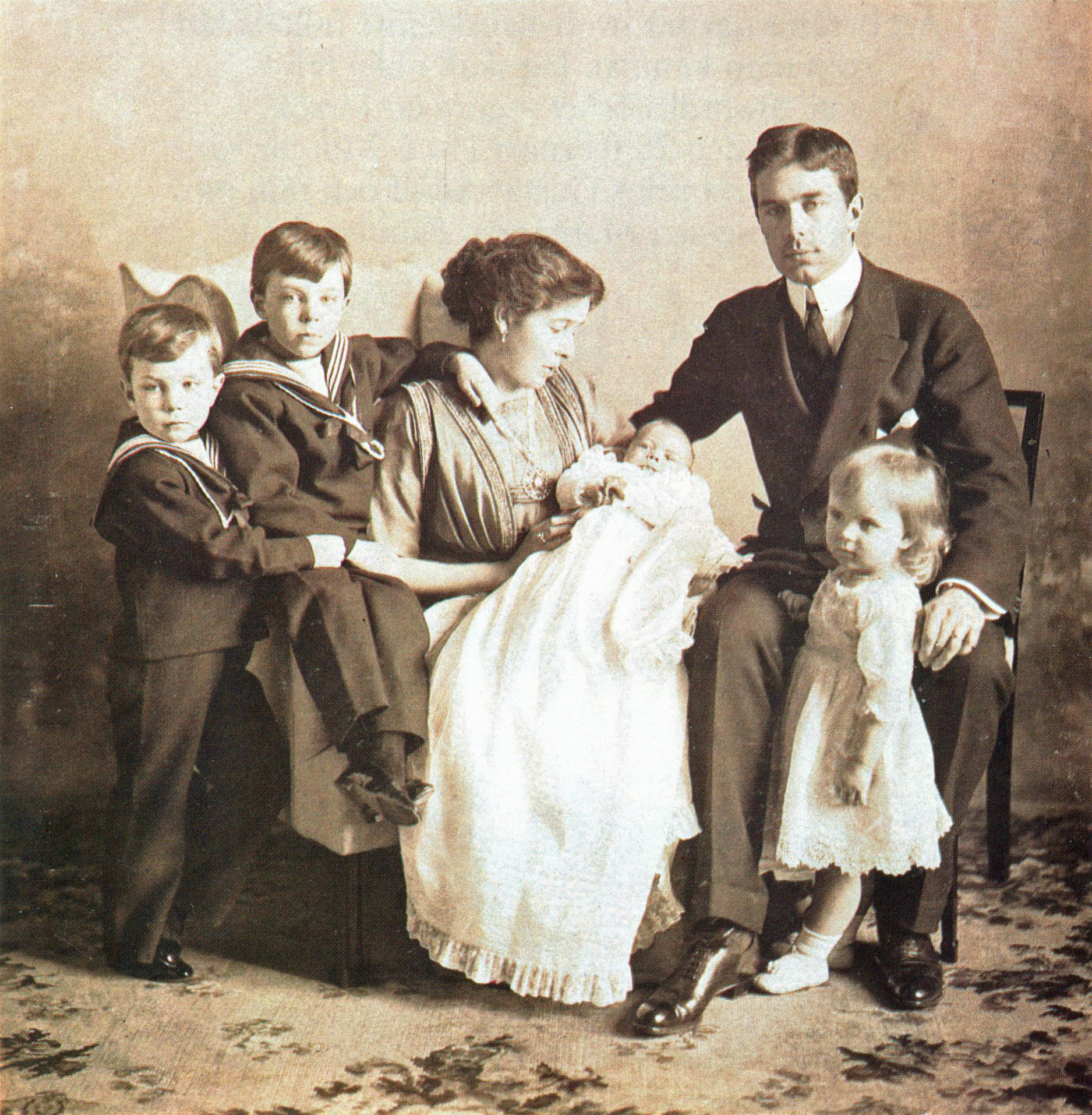
Crown Prince Gustav Adolf with Crown Princess Margareta, Prince Gustaf Adolf, Prince Sigvard, Princess Ingrid, and the newborn Prince Bertil in 1912

The couple had five children:

- Prince Gustaf Adolf, Duke of Västerbotten, who predeceased his father
- Sigvard Bernadotte, Count of Wisborg
- Ingrid, Queen of Denmark
- Prince Bertil, Duke of Halland
- Carl Johan Bernadotte, Count of Wisborg

Margaret was a dedicated mother to her children, and was determined to spend time with them. She was not keen on letting them be raised by nursery staff, as was the convention of the day.

When Gustaf Adolf's father, Crown Prince Gustaf, acceded to the throne as King Gustaf V in 1907, the couple became Crown Prince and Princess of Sweden.

== Crown Princess ==
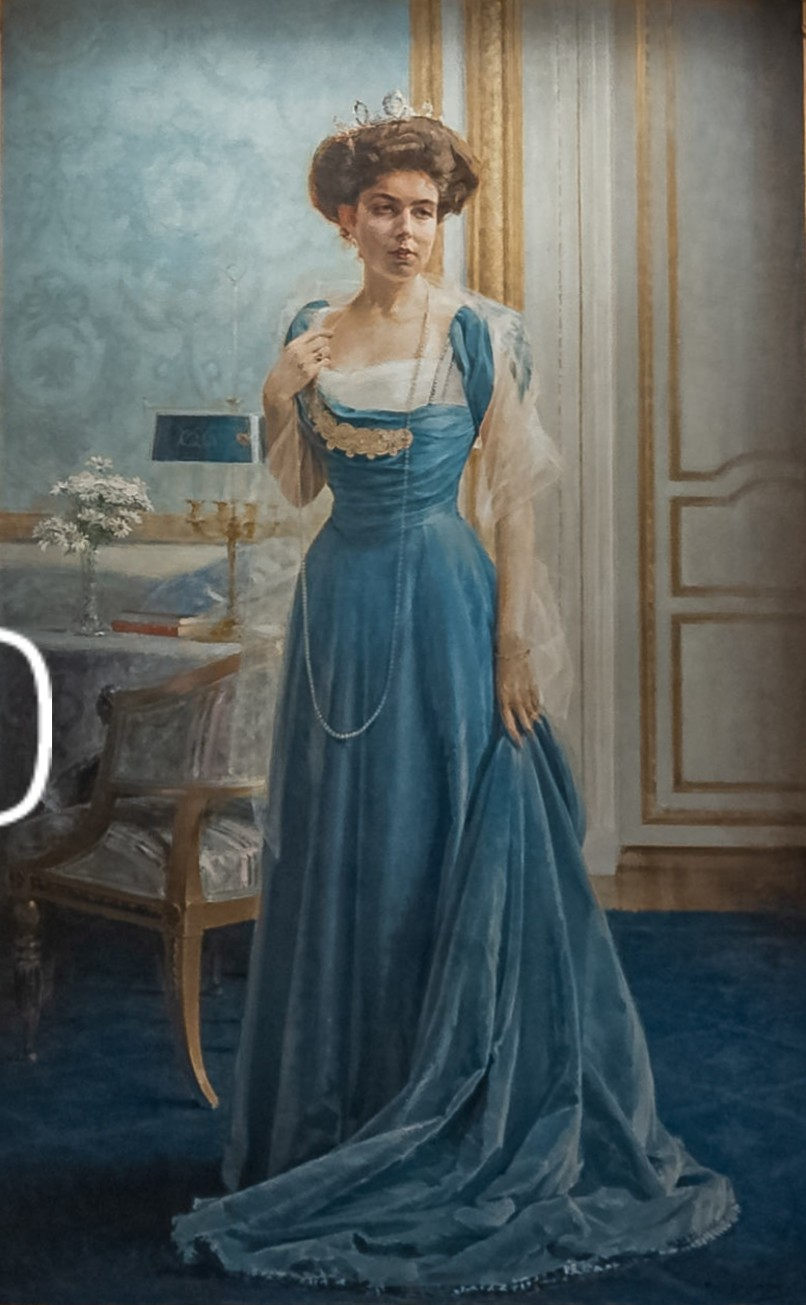
Official portrait of Crown Princess Margareta by Axel Jungstedt (1909)

The marriage between Margaret and Gustaf Adolf is described as a happy love match. Gustaf Adolf felt great pressure from the "Prussian" military discipline with which he had been raised by his mother, and he was greatly affected by and attracted to Margaret's differing English customs. The visiting Infanta Eulalia of Spain wrote that the Crown Princess gave the Swedish court "just a touch of the elegance of the Court of St James's" and of how much Margaret loved her life in Sweden.

After her arrival in Sweden, Margaret, who in Sweden was called "Margareta", received lessons in the Swedish language, and asked to be educated in Swedish history and social welfare. After two years, she spoke good Swedish. She was also eager to find out more about Sweden, and on many occasions went on incognito trips. During her first years in Sweden, Margaret behaved with great seriousness and was therefore regarded as stiff, but the view of her changed because of her great interest in sports, where she showed a more relaxed and natural manner. Margaret took a great interest in many forms of sports; she used the winters for skiing, ice skating and playing bandy, and played tennis and golf during the summers. She also corresponded with various relatives.

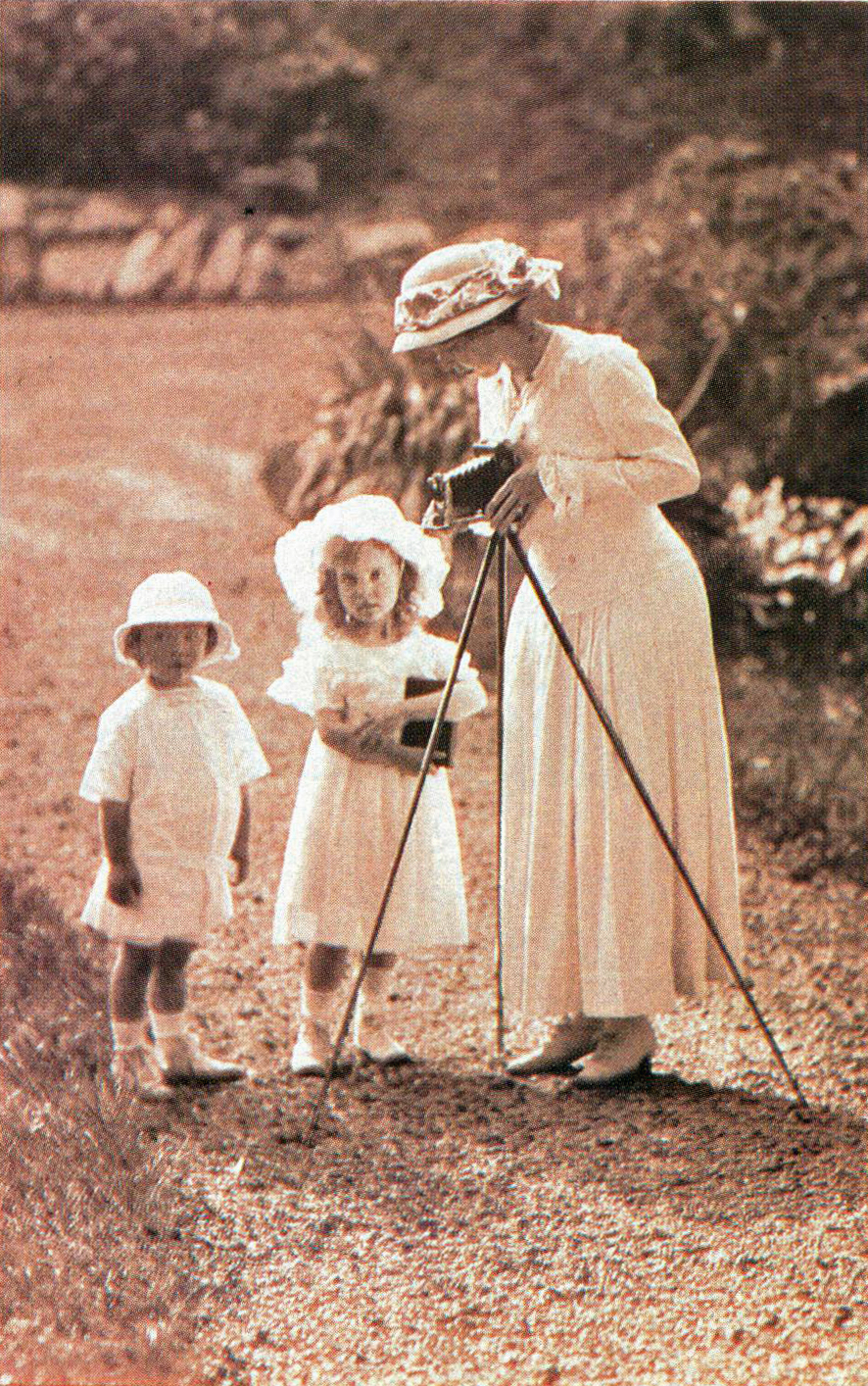
Crown Princess Margaret as an amateur photographer in the 1910s with Prince Bertil and Princess Ingrid

Margaret was also interested in art, and was an admirer of the works of Claude Monet. She photographed, painted, and took a great interest in gardening. She and her spouse received Sofiero Palace as a wedding gift, and they spent their summers there and made a great effort creating gardens in an English style on the estate; her children participated in their improvement. In 1915, Margaret as Kronprinsessan Margareta published the book Vår trädgård på Sofiero ("Our Garden at Sofiero") and two years later also Från blomstergården ("From the Flower Garden") illustrated with her own drawings and photographs, which were sold for the benefit of household schools with childcare.

During World War I, Margaret created a sewing society in Sweden to support the Red Cross. The society was called Kronprinsessans Centralförråd för landstormsmäns beklädnad och utrustning ("The Crown Princess's central storage for clothing and equipment of the home guard"), which was to equip the Swedish armed forces with suitable underwear. When paraffin supplies ran low she organized a candle collection, and in November 1917 she instituted a scheme to train girls to work on the land. She also acted as intermediary for relatives separated by the war. With her help, private letters and requests to trace men missing in action were passed on. She was also active in her work on behalf of prisoners. She aided prisoners of war in camps around Europe, especially British nationals. Margaret's efforts during the war were pro-British, in contrast to her mother-in-law's strictly pro-German attitude. In 1917, Margaret organized Margaretainsamlingen för de fattiga ("The Margaret fundraiser for the poor"). At the end of the war, when the final steps towards full democracy were taken in Sweden, Margaret's positive attitude to reform influenced her husband the Crown Prince. Unlike the attitude of her reform-hostile in-laws, King Gustaf and Queen Victoria, this is believed to have eased political tensions and preserved the Swedish monarchy.

== Death ==
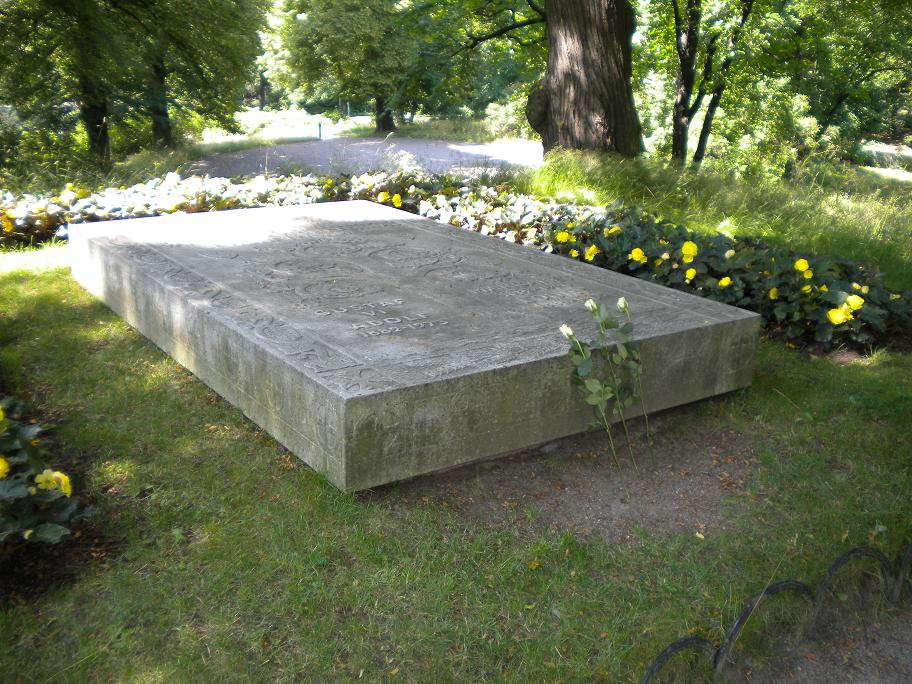
Graves of King Gustaf Adolf and his two wives, Margaret and Louise, in the Royal Cemetery on Karlsborg Island in Solna, Sweden

At 2:00 am on Saturday, 1 May 1920, her father's 70th birthday, Margaret died suddenly in Stockholm of sepsis. Sometime before this she had suffered from chickenpox which aggravated her ear, and she underwent mastoidectomy. Since the previous Sunday, she had been suffering from pain in her face from something below her eye, and doctors decided to perform another procedure. On Thursday, symptoms of erysipelas appeared under her right ear. She fell gravely ill on Friday night when symptoms of sepsis became evident, and she died within hours. At the time, she was eight months pregnant with her sixth child. In announcing her death during traditional International Workers' Day celebrations, Swedish Prime Minister Hjalmar Branting said: "the ray of sunshine at Stockholm Palace has gone out" (Solstrålen på Stockholms slott har slocknat).

In Britain, there had been reports that Margaret was unhappy in Sweden and there were dubious rumours that her death had been a suicide.

Margaret was buried according to her specific and detailed wishes, written in 1914. She asked to be buried in her wedding dress and her veil, with a crucifix in her hands, in a simple coffin made from English oak and covered in British and Swedish flags. She requested that there should be no lying-in-state after her death.

== Legacy ==
In 2021, an exhibition Daisy. Crown Princess Margareta, 1882–1920 opened at the Royal Palace in Stockholm.

The late British rose breeder David C. H. Austin released Rosa 'Crown Princess Margareta' in 2000. Princess Margaret was an accomplished landscape gardener and had a prominent role in the design and care of the gardens at Sofiero Castle.

== Honours and arms ==
=== Honours ===
- Member, Second Class, of the Royal Order of Victoria and Albert (VA)
- Companion of the Imperial Order of the Crown of India (CI)
- 25 July 1905: Lady of Justice of the Order of the Hospital of St. John of Jerusalem (DStJ)

=== Arms ===
Upon her marriage in 1905, Princess Margaret adopted the arms of a Princess of Sweden and Duchess of Scania, with an inescutcheon of her previous arms: the arms of the United Kingdom, with an inescutcheon of Saxony, the whole differenced by a label argent of five points, the first and fifth bearing fleurs-de-lys azure, the second and fourth shamrocks vert, and the central point a cross gules. The inescutcheon of Saxony was removed by King George V in 1917.

| Margaret's coat of arms as a British princess from 1917 | Margaret's coat of arms as Crown Princess of Sweden from 1917 |

== Issue ==
| Name | Birth | Death | Notes |
|---|---|---|---|
| Prince Gustaf Adolf, Duke of Västerbotten | 22 April 1906 | 26 January 1947 | Father of the current King Carl XVI Gustaf of Sweden. |
| Prince Sigvard, Duke of Uppland | 7 June 1907 | 4 February 2002 | Later Sigvard Bernadotte, Count of Wisborg. |
| Princess Ingrid | 28 March 1910 | 7 November 2000 | Later queen consort of Denmark. She was the mother of Queen Margrethe II of Denmark, who herself is the mother of the current King Frederik X of Denmark. |
| Prince Bertil, Duke of Halland | 28 February 1912 | 5 January 1997 | |
| Prince Carl Johan, Duke of Dalarna | 31 October 1916 | 5 May 2012 | Later Carl Johan Bernadotte, Count of Wisborg. He was the last living great-grandchild of Queen Victoria and Prince Albert of Saxe-Coburg and Gotha. |

== Ancestry ==
Ancestors of Princess Margaret of Connaught

8. Ernest I of Saxe-Coburg and Gotha
4. Prince Albert of Saxe-Coburg and Gotha
9. Princess Louise of Saxe-Gotha-Altenburg
2. Prince Arthur, Duke of Connaught and Strathearn
10. Prince Edward, Duke of Kent and Strathearn
5. Queen Victoria of the United Kingdom
11. Princess Victoria of Saxe-Coburg-Saalfeld
1. Princess Margaret of Connaught
12. Prince Charles of Prussia
6. Prince Frederick Charles of Prussia
13. Princess Marie of Saxe-Weimar-Eisenach
3. Princess Louise Margaret of Prussia
14. Leopold IV of Anhalt
7. Princess Maria Anna of Anhalt-Dessau
15. Princess Frederica of Prussia
