= Frederick Augustus II of Oldenburg =

Grand Duke of Oldenburg from 1900 to 1918

Frederick Augustus II
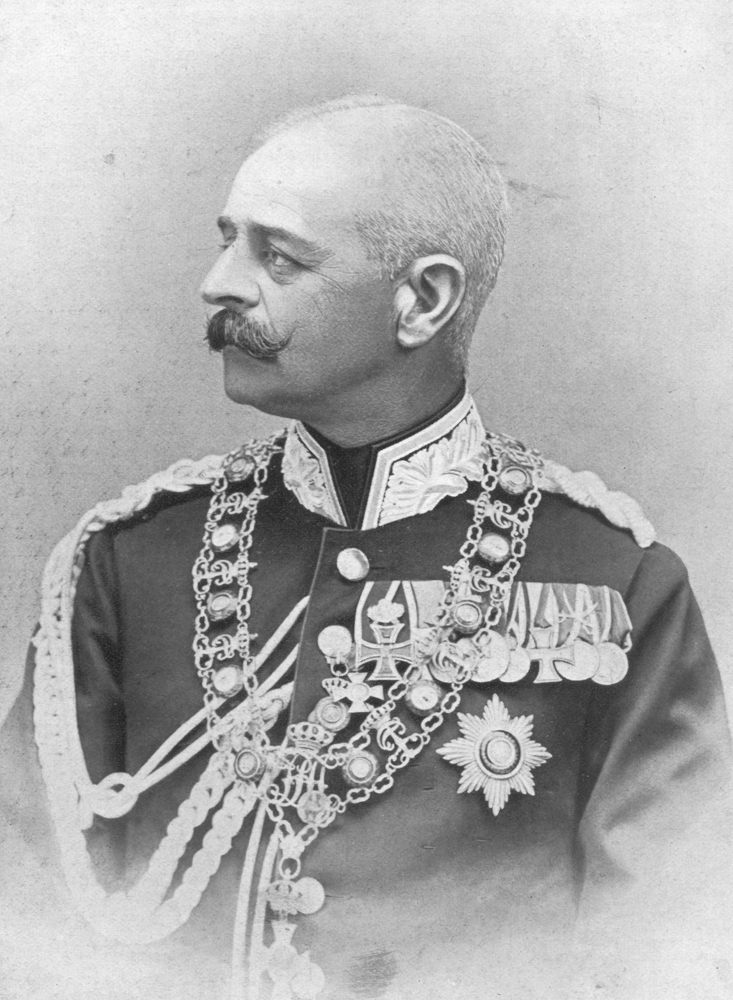
- Formal portrait, 1902

Grand Duke of Oldenburg
- Reign: 13 June 1900 – 11 November 1918
- Predecessor: Peter II
- Successor: Monarchy abolished

Head of House of Oldenburg
- Tenure: 11 November 1918 – 24 February 1931
- Successor: Nikolaus, Hereditary Grand Duke of Oldenburg
- Born: 16 November 1852; Oldenburg, Grand Duchy of Oldenburg, German Confederation
- Died: 24 February 1931 (aged 78); Rastede Palace, Rastede, Free State of Oldenburg, Weimar Republic
- Burial: Ducal (Herzogliches) Mausoleum, Gertrudenfriedhof, Oldenburg
- Spouse: Princess Elisabeth Anna of Prussia (m. 1878; died 1895) Duchess Elisabeth Alexandrine of Mecklenburg-Schwerin (m. 1896)
- Issue Detail: Sophia Charlotte, Princess Eitel Friedrich of Prussia; Duchess Margaret; Nikolaus, Hereditary Grand Duke of Oldenburg; Duke Frederick Augustus; Duchess Alexandrine; Ingeborg Alix, Princess Stephan Alexander of Schaumburg-Lippe; Altburg, Princess of Waldeck and Pyrmont
- House: Holstein-Gottorp
- Father: Peter II, Grand Duke of Oldenburg
- Mother: Princess Elisabeth of Saxe-Altenburg
- Religion: Lutheranism
- Military career
- Allegiance: German Empire
- Rank: Admiral

Frederick Augustus II (16 November 1852 in Oldenburg – 24 February 1931 in Rastede) was the last ruling Grand Duke of Oldenburg.

Frederick Augustus was the eldest son of Peter II, Grand Duke of Oldenburg. He grew up with an interest in the navy and studied at multiple German universities, before serving in the navy. In 1878, he married Princess Elisabeth Anna of Prussia, daughter of Princess Maria Anna of Anhalt-Dessau and Prince Frederick Charles of Prussia. After her death in 1895, he married Elisabeth Alexandrine of Mecklenburg-Schwerin in 1896.

He ascended to the Oldenburg throne in 1900 as Frederick Augustus II and funded multiple infrastructure projects, including the development of ports and waterways. The First World War broke out during his reign which saw the Grand Duchy of Oldenburg fight with the German Empire under Kaiser Wilhelm II on the side of the Central Powers. The German Revolution at the end of the war forced Frederick Augustus to abdicate and led to the collapse of all German monarchies. After living in exile for two decades, Frederick Augustus died at the age of 78 years old.

== Early life ==
Frederick Augustus was born on 16 November 1852 in the Grand Duchy of Oldenburg as the eldest son of Peter II, the reigning Grand Duke of Oldenburg, and Princess Elisabeth of Saxe-Altenburg. From 1861, Frederick Augustus and his younger brother, Georg Ludwig, were tutored by Bavarian general Otto von Parseval, the son-in-law of former Oldenburg court marshal Alexander von Rennenkampff. Frederick Augustus studied at the University of Bonn, University of Strasbourg and University of Leipzig. His education was completed following a seven-month-long exchange to Asia Minor, Palestine, Egypt and Italy. Following this, he joined the military and achieved the rank of lieutenant.

Frederick Augustus acquired a captain's licence at a nautical school in Elsfleth and began to regularly skipper yachts. In 1888, he rescued a shipwrecked Danish sailor on Heligoland and was awarded with the Golden Rescue Medal by the Italian government for his actions. For this, he was the only German monarch appointed Admiral of the German Imperial Navy, which was ordered by Kaiser Wilhelm II. Frederick Augustus personally captained the luxury yacht Lensahn on family trips through the Baltic and Mediterranean Seas.

In 1899, the Shipbuilding Technical Society was founded and Frederick Augustus served as its honorary chairman until 1930. Additionally, he was one of the founders of the German School Ship Association, which campaigned for the expansion of seamanship training capacities for the German merchant navy, in January 1900.

== Reign ==
Frederick Augustus' reign began on 13 June 1900, when his father died. Considered conservative by the German media, Frederick Augustus was a supporter of Wilhelminism and became interested in the development of technology, seafaring and the navy. He also invested in the development of waterways, including the Hunte Canal, which expanded Oldenburg ports on the Weser and promoted the construction of new industrial factories. German historian August Geerkens wrote of Frederick Augustus: "He was popular with the population; everyone smiled when his car drove through the streets with all the fanfare. But he was also headstrong. The old soldiers in the country still suspected him because, as a lieutenant, he had been a trooper."

In 1904, Frederick Augustus designed the "Niki Propeller", a ship propeller which he asked to be built by a Hamburg manufacturing company, however they refused as they believed it would produce a financial loss. Nonetheless, for his nautical achievements, Frederick Augustus was awarded a Doctorate at the Leibniz University Hannover in 1910. During his reign, Frederick Augustus also ordered the building of the Elisabeth-Anna-Palais, named after his first wife, who died during its construction. On 1 December 1906, a law introducing administrative jurisdiction came into effect per a decree signed by Frederick Augustus. The law had previously been drafted by lawyer Karl Dugend, but was defeated in the legislature. Moreover, on 14 January 1914, the construction of a training ship was completed by Joh. C. Tecklenborg. It was christened in 1918 in Frederick Augustus' name, and the ship is still in use today by Norway, which uses the name Statsraad Lehmkuhl for the vessel.

Being a state of the German Empire, the Grand Duchy of Oldenburg took part in World War I, under Frederick Augustus' rule. He personally commanded the Grand Ducal Oldenburg Cavalry Regiment during the war, in which he adhered to a group of annexationists, who wanted to secure Germany's position of power by acquiring foreign territories. He supported the invasion of Belgium and believed that France should be made a vassal state of Germany and be divided into a northern republic and southern Bourbon Kingdom. On 24 September 1914, he created the Friedrich-August-Kreuz, an Oldenburg military order. According to Geerkens, Frederick Augustus was pushed by Grand Admiral Alfred von Tirpitz to approach the King of Bavaria, Ludwig III, and suggest that the German monarchs demand that Wilhelm dismiss the Chancellor of Germany, Theobald von Bethmann Hollweg, who was accused of acting too weak and slowing German victory. Many German monarchs, including Frederick Augustus, were also disappointed with Bethmann Hollweg's rejection of the Reichstag Peace Resolution in 1917.

Frederick Augustus was forced to abdicate, along with all other German monarchs in the course of the German Revolution. The 11 November 1918 was soon signed, ending World War I, and the monarchy was officially abolished on 28 November 1918. Frederick Augustus' Grand Duchy was then assumed by the newly established Weimar Republic.

== Life in exile ==
Frederick Augustus and his family took up residence at Rastede Castle, where he took up farming and local industrial interests. A year after his abdication, he asked the Oldenburg Diet for a yearly allowance of 150,000 marks, stating that his financial condition was "extremely precarious". To further finance himself, Frederick Augustus sold part of his art collection which had been left to him as his own private property, instead of being given to the state. In total, a third of his former grand duchy's art was sold. He exported paintings, such as those of Rembrandt, to the Netherlands in 1919 with the help of industrialist Georg Bölts. Part of the proceeds was donated to the meat processing factory Bölts AG. Philosopher Karl Jaspers, who grew up in Oldenburg, wrote in his memoirs of this endeavour: "The Grand Duke used some of the money from the sale of the pictures to help found a sausage factory, which subsequently collapsed." Frederick Augustus' sale of arts helped to later influence the Cultural Property Protection Act 2019.

== Death ==
Frederick Augustus died on 24 February 1931 in Rastede. He was subsequently buried in the Grand Ducal Mausoleum of the Gertrudenfriedhof cemetery in Oldenburg.

== Marriages and issue ==
On 18 February 1878, Frederick Augustus married Princess Elisabeth Anna of Prussia, daughter of Prince Frederick Charles of Prussia. It was a double wedding, in which Princess Charlotte of Prussia (daughter of the Crown Prince and Crown Princess of Prussia) married Bernhard, Hereditary Prince of Saxe-Meiningen on the same day as Elisabeth Anna in Berlin. The marriages were the first such occasions performed since Prussia had become the German Empire in 1870. Due to this increased status, the weddings were attended by many important personages, including Leopold II of Belgium and his wife, Queen Marie Henriette. The Prince of Wales also attended, as Charlotte, one of the brides, was his niece.

They had two daughters:

Name	Birth	Death	Notes
Duchess Sophia Charlotte	2 February 1879	29 March 1964	married Prince Eitel Friedrich of Prussia, younger son of Wilhelm II of Germany.
Duchess Margaret	13 October 1881	20 February 1882	died in infancy.

Elisabeth died on 28 August 1895 before he succeeded as Grand Duke. Before her death, her husband had been building a new residential palace; once she died, Frederick named the new building the Elisabeth-Anna-Palais in her honor.

On 24 October 1896, Frederick Augustus married Duchess Elisabeth Alexandrine of Mecklenburg-Schwerin, daughter of Frederick Francis II, Grand Duke of Mecklenburg. He succeeded as Grand Duke of Oldenburg in 1900.

They had five children:

Name	Birth	Death	Notes
Nicolas Frederick William, Hereditary Grand Duke of Oldenburg	10 August 1897	3 April 1970	Married Princess Helena of Waldeck and Pyrmont.
Duke Frederick Augustus	25 March 1900	26 March 1900	Twin with Alexandrine, died in infancy.
Duchess Alexandrine	25 March 1900	26 March 1900	Twin with Frederick Augustus, died in infancy.
Duchess Ingeborg Alix	20 July 1901	10 January 1996	Married Prince Stephan Alexander of Schaumburg-Lippe, younger son of Georg, Prince of Schaumburg-Lippe. Their children included Princess Marie Alix of Schaumburg-Lippe.
Duchess Altburg Marie Mathilde Olga	19 May 1903	16 June 2001	Married Josias, Hereditary Prince of Waldeck and Pyrmont. Altburg and Josias were the parents of Wittekind Fürst zu Waldeck und Pyrmont.

== Honours ==
- Oldenburg: Grand Cross of the Order of Duke Peter Friedrich Ludwig, 16 November 1852; Grand Prior, ca. 1853
- Brunswick: Grand Cross of Henry the Lion, 1871
- Württemberg: Grand Cross of the Württemberg Crown, 1873
- (Saxe-Coburg and Gotha) (Duchy of Saxe-Altenburg) (Saxe-Meiningen) Ernestine duchies: Grand Cross of the Saxe-Ernestine House Order, 1874
- Kingdom of Prussia: Knight of the Black Eagle, with Collar, 1 January 1878
- Grand Duchy of Hesse: Grand Cross of the Ludwig Order, 18 February 1878
- Belgium: Grand Cordon of the Order of Leopold (military), 25 February 1878
- Duchy of Anhalt: Grand Cross of Albert the Bear, 1885
- Kingdom of Bavaria: Knight of St. Hubert, 1888
- Saxe-Weimar-Eisenach: Grand Cross of the White Falcon, 1890
- Baden: Knight of the House Order of Fidelity, 1900
- Kingdom of Saxony: Knight of the Rue Crown, 1898
- Kingdom of Italy: Knight of the Annunciation, 16 July 1902
- United Kingdom: Honorary Grand Cross of the Royal Victorian Order, 10 June 1907
- Austria-Hungary: Grand Cross of St. Stephen, 1908
- Denmark: Knight of the Elephant, 28 April 1909
- Sweden: Knight of the Seraphim, 12 July 1912

== Ancestry ==
Ancestors of Frederick Augustus II of Oldenburg

16. Prince Georg Ludwig of Holstein-Gottorp
8. Peter I, Grand Duke of Oldenburg
17. Princess Sophie Charlotte of Schleswig-Holstein-Sonderburg-Beck
4. Augustus, Grand Duke of Oldenburg
18. Frederick II Eugene, Duke of Württemberg
9. Duchess Frederica of Württemberg
19. Friederike Dorothea of Brandenburg-Schwedt
2. Peter II, Grand Duke of Oldenburg
20. Karl Louis, Prince of Anhalt-Bernburg-Schaumburg-Hoym
10. Victor II, Prince of Anhalt-Bernburg-Schaumburg-Hoym
21. Princess Amalie Eleonore of Solms-Braunfels
5. Princess Ida of Anhalt-Bernburg-Schaumburg-Hoym
22. Charles Christian, Prince of Nassau-Weilburg
11. Princess Amelia of Nassau-Weilburg
23. Princess Carolina of Orange-Nassau
1. Frederick Augustus II, Grand Duke of Oldenburg
24. Ernest Frederick III, Duke of Saxe-Hildburghausen
12. Frederick, Duke of Saxe-Altenburg
25. Princess Ernestine of Saxe-Weimar
6. Joseph, Duke of Saxe-Altenburg
26. Charles II, Grand Duke of Mecklenburg
13. Duchess Charlotte Georgine of Mecklenburg-Strelitz
27. Princess Friederike of Hesse-Darmstadt
3. Princess Elisabeth of Saxe-Altenburg
28. Frederick II Eugene, Duke of Württemberg = 18
14. Duke Louis of Württemberg
29. Friederike Dorothea of Brandenburg-Schwedt = 19
7. Duchess Amelia of Württemberg
30. Charles Christian, Prince of Nassau-Weilburg = 22
15. Princess Henriette of Nassau-Weilburg
31. Princess Carolina of Orange-Nassau = 23

== Bibliography ==
- Radziwill, Catherine (1915). Memories of Forty Years. London: Funk & Wagnalls Company.

Frederick Augustus II of Oldenburg House of Oldenburg Born: 16 November 1852 Died: 24 February 1931
Regnal titles
Preceded by Peter II	Grand Duke of Oldenburg; 13 June 1900 – 11 November 1918	Monarchy abolished German Revolution
Titles in pretence
Loss of title Republic declared	— TITULAR — Grand Duke of Oldenburg; 11 November 1918 – 24 February 1931; Reason for succession failure: Grand Duchy abolished in 1918	Succeeded by Duke Nikolaus
