= Battle of Ladon and Mézières =

- Part of Franco-Prussian War
Date	November 17, 1870
Location	Ladon and Mézières-en-Gâtinais, Loiret, France
Result	German victory

Belligerents
France	North German Confederation: Prussia; Mecklenburg-Schwerin

Commanders and leaders
Louis d'Aurelle de Paladines Captain Crouzat	Prince Friedrich Karl General Lehmann; General Valentini

Units involved
Armée de la Loire	37th Brigade; 39th Brigade

Strength
30,500 Infantry	12,000 Infantry

Casualties and losses
"Heavy losses" 1 officer and 170 soldiers captured	13 officers and 220 soldiers killed

The Battle of Ladon and Mézières was fought at Ladon and Mézières-en-Gâtinais between the French Army of the Loire led by Louis d'Aurelle de Paladines and Imperial German Army led by Prince Friedrich Karl of Prussia on November 17, 1870. During the battle the Prussians forced the French forces to retreat into the Bellegarde woods. Although the French army was quickly defeated in this battle, it showed the Prussians the substantial size of the French XX corps. the engagement showed the Germans that substantial forces of the French XX Corps were present on the battlefield. The defeat caused great damage to French morale. On November 17 the French attacked the Prussians again at the Battle of Beaune-la-Rolande, but they were defeated again.

== Background ==
On November 9, 1870, the Army of the Loire of France by d'Aurelle de Paladines commanding army defeated the Bavarians under the command of Lieutenant General of the Infantry Von der Tann in the Battle of Coulmiers, forcing the Bavarians to reel from Orléans. The French could not pursue, but d'Aurelle became a threat to the German Siege of Paris. Facing the situation, the German High Command ordered Prince Friedrich Karl to quickly march from Metz to Loire. After much maneuvering, he pulled through Sens, Bambouillet, Nemours, and Pithiviers. Now the goal of the Prince-Marshal of Prussia was to join forces with the legion of Friedrich Franz II, Grand Duke of Mecklenburg-Schwerin, between Toury and Prithiviers. At that time, his army would be deployed to the north of the French to drive d'Aurelle to the left bank of the Loire.

To accomplish this, Mecklenburg also received orders to shift his positions to the west, so that his troops would look south when Friedrich Karl's army arrived. Meanwhile, d'Aurelle seemed to dodge a decisive battle with the Prussian Prince, and on November 23, the French Minister for the legions ordered the army to head towards the Paris. Several divisions were assigned by him to pave the way. On the same day the German X Army Corps which was part of the Second Army, was stationed at Beaune-la-Rolande, with the 38th Infantry brigade of General Wedell and the Cavalry brigade of General Rautzau. The remains of the X Corps were near Montargis. From these positions, they sent patrols on all sides and discovered French detachments in all the vicinity.

== The Battle ==
Subsequent events pushed d'Aurelle back into the defensive position once again. To carry out the consolidation mission at Beaune on 24 November, the brigades of Lehmann and Valentini that day marched two routes from Montargis to Ladon and Corbeilles. Attached to Valentini's brigade was a corps of artillery. The French advanced from the forests east of Orléans in three powerful vertical formations to cover the left flank of the Germans. While the French army had over 30,000 soldiers, the German army had only 12,000. Two German brigades were deployed to the left and the artillery corps was brought back to Beaune, and a strong offensive campaign was launched against the French attack.

At 11 am, Lehmann's forces confronted the midfield XII Corps of France, and defeated the enemy with a short but heated battle. When the French army was ordered to retreat, only a company of Prussians continued to pursuit the enemy. The vast majority of Lehmann's brigade continued on towards Beaune. Following Lehmann's victory at Ladon, Valentini also defeated the French. After Valentini's victory at Maizières, the two brigades united and drove the French to the Bellegarde forest.

After the battle, the German army continued its march to Beaune, and on November 25, 1870 most of the X Army assembled at Beaune-la-Rolande. While the Germans suffered casualties of 13 officers and 220 men, the number of French killed and wounded was even greater, with 1 officer and 170 French soldiers taken prisoner.
