= Prince Eitel Friedrich of Prussia =

Prussian prince (1883–1942)

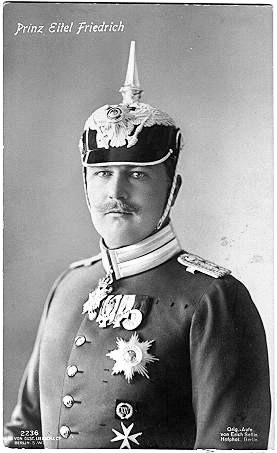
- Eitel Friedrich as captain of the First Regiment of Foot Guards, Potsdam, in 1914
- Born: 7 July 1883; Marmorpalais, Potsdam, Prussia, German Empire
- Died: 8 December 1942 (aged 59); Potsdam, Brandenburg, Nazi Germany
- Burial: 12 December 1942; Antique Temple, Potsdam, Nazi Germany
- Spouse: Duchess Sophia Charlotte of Oldenburg (m. 1906; div. 1926)
Names
- German: Wilhelm Eitel Friedrich Christian Karl Prinz von Preußen
- House: Hohenzollern
- Father: Wilhelm II, German Emperor
- Mother: Augusta Victoria of Schleswig-Holstein

Prince Wilhelm Eitel Friedrich Christian Karl of Prussia (7 July 1883 – 8 December 1942) was the second son of Emperor Wilhelm II of Germany by his first wife, Princess Augusta Viktoria of Schleswig-Holstein-Sonderburg-Augustenburg. He was born and died in Potsdam, Germany. He was also called less formally Eitel Fritz.

== Early life ==
Prince Eitel Friedrich was born on 7 July 1883 as the second son of the then Prince Wilhelm of Prussia, and his first wife, Princess Augusta Victoria of Schleswig-Holstein. A great-grandson of the British Queen Victoria, he was born in the Marmorpalais of Potsdam in the Province of Brandenburg, where his parents resided until his father acceded to the Prussian and imperial thrones in 1888 as Emperor Wilhelm II. He spent his childhood with his siblings at the New Palace, also in Potsdam, and was educated privately with his brothers at the Princes' House in Plön, in his mother's ancestral Schleswig-Holstein.

On 27 February 1906, in Berlin, Prince Eitel Friedrich married Duchess Sophia Charlotte of Oldenburg (1879–1964).

In 1907, it was reported that a Member of the Reichstag, Otto Arendt, had proposed the elevation of Alsace-Lorraine to a grand duchy within the empire, with Eitel Friedrich as grand duke; however, while the Emperor expressed interest in this, ultimately nothing came of the proposal.

== First World War ==
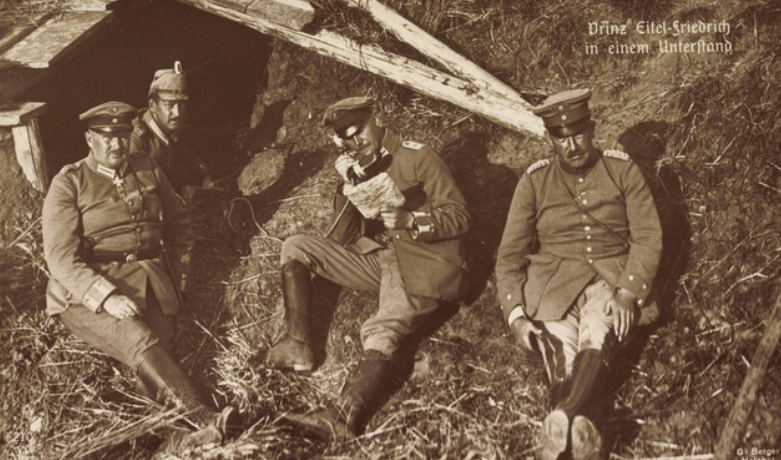
Prince Eitel Friedrich on the far left telephoning from a trench on the field of north Poland in 1915

Raised at the cadet corps of Plön Castle, Prince Eitel was in the front line from the beginning of World War I and was wounded at Bapaume, where he commanded the Prussian First Foot Guards. He temporarily relinquished command to Count Hans-Jürgen von Blumenthal, but returned to duty before the end of the year. The following year, he was transferred to the Eastern Front. During the summer of 1915, he was out in a field in Russia when he had a chance encounter with Manfred von Richthofen, who had just crashed with his superior officer, Count Holck. The two men were hiding in a nearby tree line from what they thought was the advancing Russian army and who turned out to be the grenadiers, guardsmen, and officers of Prince Eitel.

== Later life ==
After the end of the war and the monarchy, unlike other members of his family Eitel Friedrich continued to live in Germany, at a private house in Potsdam, Villa Ingenheim. He was active in monarchist circles and in Der Stahlhelm, an ex-servicemen's organization. In 1921, the Berlin criminal court found him guilty of the fraudulent transfer of 300,000 Marks and sentenced him to a fine of 5000 Marks.

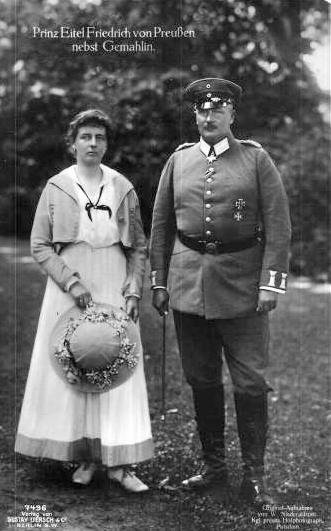
Eitel Friedrich and Sophia Charlotte in 1925

Eitel and his wife Duchess Sophia Charlotte of Oldenburg had no children and were divorced in October 1926. Eitel had begun divorce proceedings in March 1919, alleging infidelities before the war. The final judgement of the court found Eitel to be the more guilty party.

== Titles ==
From 1907 to 1926, he was Master of the Knights (Herrenmeister) of the Order of St. John (Johanniterorden). He received the Pour le Mérite order in 1915. His body is buried at the Antique Temple in Sanssouci Park, Potsdam.

== Regimental Commissions ==
- Hauptmann (captain) and commander of the Leibkompagnie (Life-company), 1. Garderegiment zu Fuß (1st Regiment of Foot Guards)
- à la suite, Grenadierregiment König Friedrich Wilhelm IV.(1. Pommersches) Nr. 2
- à la suite, 1. Gardelandwehrregiment (Guard Reserve Regiment)
- Hauptmann (captain), Austria-Hungary K.u.K. Infantry Regiment "Wilhelm I., Deutscher Kaiser und König von Preußen" Nr. 34
- Hauptmann (captain), Saxon Army
- à la suite, 7. Königsinfanterieregiment (King's Infantry Regiment) Nr. 106
- First Brigade of Imperial Guards, commander, 1914–15

== Orders and decorations ==
German decorations

- Prussia:
  - Knight of the Black Eagle, 7 July 1893; with Collar, 17 January 1902
  - Grand Cross of the Red Eagle, with Crown, 7 July 1893
  - Knight of the Prussian Crown, 1st Class, 7 July 1893
  - Grand Commander's Cross of the Royal House Order of Hohenzollern, 7 July 1893
  - 34th Master of Knights of the Johanniter Order, 1907–1926
  - Founder of the Cross of the Mount of Olives, 24 December 1909
  - Iron Cross (1914), 2nd and 1st Classes
  - Pour le Mérite (military), 22 March 1915; with Oak Leaves, 14 May 1915
- (Hohenzollern-Sigmaringen) Hohenzollern: Cross of Honour of the Princely House Order of Hohenzollern, 1st Class with Swords
- Baden:
  - Knight of the House Order of Fidelity, 1904
  - Commander of the Military Karl-Friedrich Merit Order
- Bavaria:
  - Knight of St. Hubert, 1913
  - Officer of the Military Merit Order, with Swords
- Brunswick: War Merit Cross
- (Saxe-Coburg and Gotha) (Duchy of Saxe-Altenburg) Ernestine duchies:
  - Grand Cross of the Saxe-Ernestine House Order, with Swords
  - Cross for Merit in War (Saxe-Meiningen)
- Hamburg: Hanseatic Cross
- Hesse and by Rhine: Grand Cross of the Ludwig Order, 7 September 1904
- Mecklenburg:
  - Grand Cross of the Wendish Crown, with Crown in Ore
  - Cross for Distinction in War, 1st Class (Strelitz)
- Oldenburg:
  - Grand Cross of the Order of Duke Peter Friedrich Ludwig, with Golden Crown, Collar and Swords
  - Friedrich August Cross, 1st Class
- Saxony:
  - Knight of the Rue Crown
  - Knight of the Military Order of St. Henry, 20 March 1915
- Württemberg: Grand Cross of the Württemberg Crown, 1899

Foreign decorations

- (Austrian Empire) (Kingdom of Hungary) Austria-Hungary: Grand Cross of the Royal Hungarian Order of St. Stephen, 1900
- China: Order of the Double Dragon, Class I Grade II
- Denmark: Knight of the Elephant, 19 November 1906
- Greece: Grand Cross of the Redeemer
- Italy: Knight of the Annunciation, 27 August 1902
- Japan: Grand Cordon of the Order of the Chrysanthemum, 21 May 1908
- Montenegro: Grand Cross of the Order of Prince Danilo I
- Netherlands: Grand Cross of the Netherlands Lion
- Norway: Grand Cross of St. Olav, with Collar, 15 December 1906
- Ottoman Empire:
  - Order of Glory
  - Order of Osmanieh, 1st Class in Diamonds
- Persia: Order of the Lion and the Sun, 1st Class
- Portugal:
  - Grand Cross of the Tower and Sword
  - Grand Cross of the Sash of the Two Orders
- Romania:
  - Grand Cross of the Order of Carol I
  - Grand Cross of the Crown of Romania
- Russia: Knight of St. Andrew, 1910
- (Thailand) Siam:
  - Knight of the Order of the Royal House of Chakri, 6 June 1902
  - Grand Cross of the Crown of Siam
- Spain: Knight of the Military Merit Order, 3rd Class
- Sweden: Knight of the Seraphim, 1 December 1904
- United Kingdom: Honorary Grand Cross of the Royal Victorian Order, 1 July 1904 (expelled in 1915)

Honours

Two ships were named after Prince Eitel, the passenger ship Prince Eitel Friedrich (1901) and the Reich postal steamer Prince Eitel Friedrich (1904).

== Ancestry ==
Ancestors of Prince Eitel Friedrich of Prussia

8. William I, German Emperor
4. Frederick III, German Emperor
9. Princess Augusta of Saxe-Weimar-Eisenach
2. Wilhelm II, German Emperor
10. Prince Albert of Saxe-Coburg and Gotha
5. Victoria, Princess Royal
11. Victoria, Queen of the United Kingdom
1. Prince Eitel Friedrich of Prussia
12. Christian August II, Duke of Schleswig-Holstein-Sonderburg-Augustenburg
6. Frederick VIII, Duke of Schleswig-Holstein
13. Countess Louise Sophie af Danneskiold-Samsøe
3. Princess Augusta Victoria of Schleswig-Holstein-Sonderburg-Augustenburg
14. Ernst I, Prince of Hohenlohe-Langenburg
7. Princess Adelheid of Hohenlohe-Langenburg
15. Princess Feodora of Leiningen

== Sources ==
Schench, G. Handbuch über den Königlich Preuβischen Hof und Staat fur das Jahr 1908. Berlin, Prussia, 1907.

Prince Eitel Friedrich of Prussia House of Hohenzollern Born: 7 July 1883 Died: 8 December 1942
Preceded by Albrecht, Prinz von Preußen	Herrenmeister (Grand Master) of the Order of Saint John; 1907–1926	Succeeded by Oskar, Prinz von Preußen
