= Prince Friedrich Karl of Prussia (1828–1885) =

German general (1828–1885)

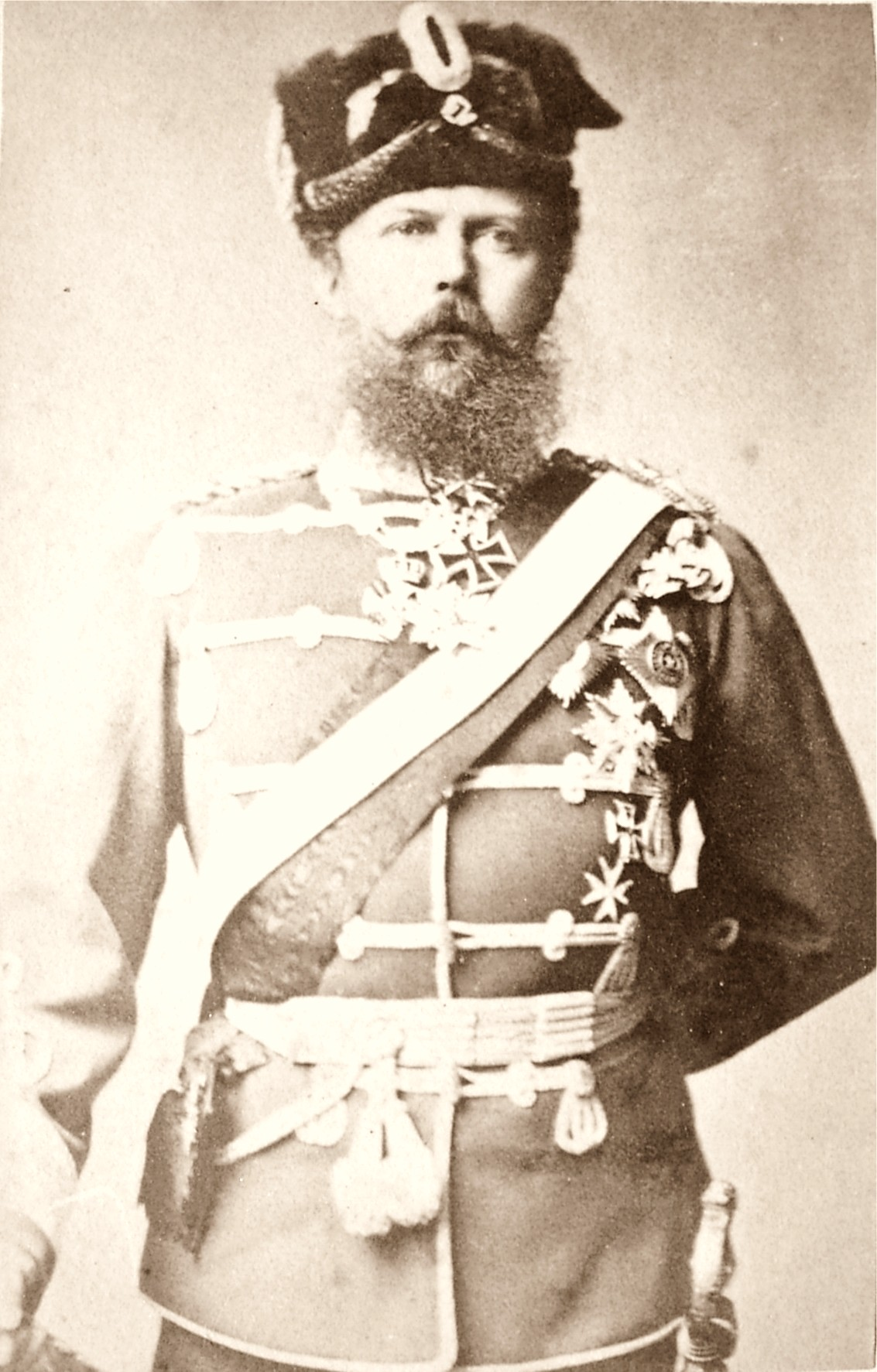
- Prince Friedrich Karl wearing his Grand Cross of the Iron Cross
- Born: 20 March 1828; Berlin, Kingdom of Prussia
- Died: 15 June 1885 (aged 57); Jagdschloss Glienicke, Potsdam, Kingdom of Prussia, German Empire
- Burial: Peter and Paul Church, Berlin
- Spouse: Princess Maria Anna of Anhalt-Dessau (m. 1854)
- Issue: Marie, Princess Henry of the Netherlands; Elisabeth, Hereditary Grand Duchess of Oldenburg; Princess Anna Victoria; Princess Louise Margaret, Duchess of Connaught and Strathearn; Prince Friedrich Leopold
Names
- Friedrich Karl Nikolaus
- House: Hohenzollern
- Father: Prince Charles of Prussia
- Mother: Princess Marie of Saxe-Weimar-Eisenach
- Military career
- Allegiance: Kingdom of Prussia; German Empire
- Branch: Prussian Army; Imperial German Army
- Rank: Generalfeldmarschall
- Commands: III Corps; First Army; Second Army
- Conflicts: See battles: First Schleswig War; Second Schleswig War; Battle of Mysunde; Battle of Dybbøl; Austro-Prussian War; Battle of Münchengrätz; Battle of Königgrätz; Franco-Prussian War; Siege of Bitche; Battle of Mars-la-Tour; Siege of Metz; Battle of Ladon and Mézières; Battle of Beaune-la-Rolande; Second Battle of Orléans; Battle of Le Mans
- Awards: Pour le Mérite (Grand Cross); Iron Cross (Grand Cross); Order of the Black Eagle

Signature
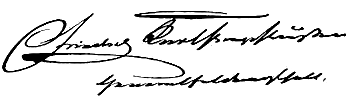

Prince Friedrich Karl Nikolaus of Prussia (20 March 1828 – 15 June 1885) was the son of Prince Charles of Prussia and Princess Marie of Saxe-Weimar-Eisenach. He was the grandson of King Frederick William III of Prussia and nephew of Frederick William IV and William I. Friedrich Karl is highly regarded as a military commander.

As a military commander, the Prince had a major influence on the Royal Prussian Army's advances in training and tactics in the 1850s and 1860s. He commanded one of the armies which defeated the Austrian army at the Battle of Königgrätz in 1866 and the French Army of the Rhine at the Battle of Mars-la-Tour, overseeing the defeat of the Army of the Rhine at the Siege of Metz in 1870.

== Biography ==
Friedrich Karl was born at the Royal Palace in Berlin on 20 March 1828, as the only son of Prince Charles of Prussia, the brother of future German emperor William I. From 1842 to 1846, Frederick Charles was under the military tutelage of then Major Albrecht von Roon. In 1845, the Prince joined the army and was sent to an infantry company. Roon accompanied the Prince to the University of Bonn in 1846. He was the first Hohenzollern prince to study in a university. He became a member of the Corps Borussia Bonn in 1847 and was awarded Prussia's Lifesaving Medal for rescuing a child from the Rhine the same year. After his studies, the Prince went back to his regiment in 1848, where he was promoted to captain. His company was issued the breech-loading Dreyse needle gun and the Prince produced an article on its probable future impact, writing that the troops could be prevented from firing off all their ammunition through good training and discipline. He served on Friedrich Graf von Wrangel's staff during the First Schleswig War of 1848. During the war Friedrich Karl received the Pour le Mérite. He shifted to the cavalry branch in October 1848 and was promoted to major in June 1849. He partook in a campaign in the Baden Revolution of 1849, during which he was wounded twice while leading a Guards Hussar squadron at the battle of Wiesenthal against Baden rebels. He continued to lead his squadron up till 1852.

In 1851, the Prince wrote a radical field manual for light troops, underlining the importance of training individual soldiers to take the initiative and not wait for orders. During the following peace years he was promoted to colonel in 1852 and granted the command of the Guards Dragoon Regiment, where he introduced realistic field exercises and insisted on combat readiness. He became major general and commander of the 1st Guards Cavalry Brigade in 1854 and lieutenant general in 1856. He commanded the 1st Guards Infantry Division from 19 February to 18 September 1857, but resigned after encountering significant opposition to his approach on training. In 1859, he published the study On French Tactics, which highlighted the decisiveness of troop morale. In 1860, the Prince published a military book, titled, "Eine militärische Denkschrift von P. F. K.", which contained a series of reform proposals. As commander of III Army Corps from 1 July 1860 to 17 July 1870, the Prince implemented his reforms and turned his corps into a leader in Prussian military innovation.

Promoted to General der Kavallerie, the Prince took part in the Second Schleswig War of 1864 against Denmark, where he held command over the Prussian troops in the Austro-Prussian expeditionary force and defeated the Danes at the Battle of Dybbøl. In May 1864, he became supreme commander of the Austro-Prussian allied army and conquered Jutland.

Although the prince performed well in the Second Schleswig War, Otto von Bismarck did not want Karl to become supreme commander. It was reported in several German newspapers that Bismarck was invited to a dinner hosted by Karl. During the dinner Bismarck said that he felt Karl was too young to hold the position. Karl rose up in anger and walked up to Bismarck. Bismarck got up and responded by slapping him several times. Karl went to Wilhelm I immediately and protested. The king reportedly took Karl's side in the altercation, which angered Bismarck.

He served with distinction in the Austro-Prussian War where he commanded the First Army, consisting of the II, III, IV, and Cavalry corps. At the start of the war the prince's army marched to the East. This caused a gap between the First Army and the Second Army, however enabled it to link up with the Army of the Elbe. On June 28, the Prince and Karl Eberhard Herwarth von Bittenfeld attacked the Austrian Army at Munchengratz. They gained a victory in that battle and caused the Austrians to retreat to Jičín. On 29 June 1866, the prince ordered August von Werder, commanding the 3rd Division, to fight against the Austrians at Jičín. The 3rd Division was victorious in the resulting Battle of Gitschin but the campaign was ill regarded by the headquarters as it was outside of the strategic plans of King William of Prussia. Friedrich Karl was disappointed by the German General Staff in return. Meanwhile the combined operation of the two armies strained the supply lines and both Armies were starving. Chief of Staff Helmuth von Moltke inferred that the operational aim of Friedrich Karl was not to unite with the Second Army at Jičín but to capture Prague on his own. Before the Battle of Königgrätz, the troops of the prince were at Kamenitz. By his command the First Army was the first to arrive at Königgrätz. Along with the Army of the Elbe, the First Army held the numerically superior Austrians at bay for seven hours from 08:00 to 15:00, inflicting such massive casualties on the Austrians that it took the arrival of just one division from the Second Army, the latter commanded by his cousin the Crown Prince Frederick William, to complete the victory and cause the Austrians to order a general withdrawal at 15:00. The First Army then marched on Vienna. After the war, he was awarded the Grand Cross of the Pour le Mérite.

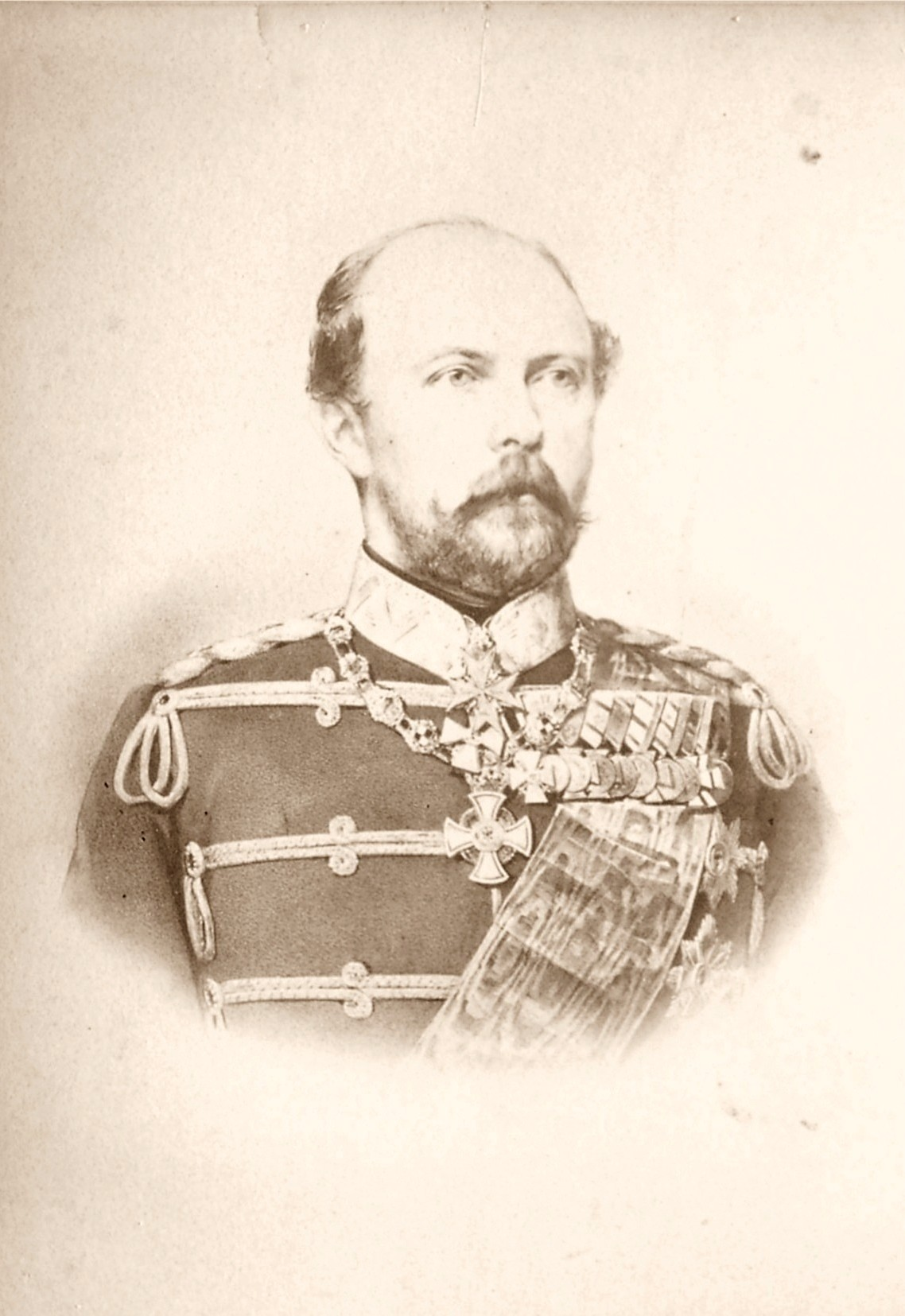
Drawing of Prince Friedrich Karl

He was elected to the North German Reichstag in the February 1867 North German federal election, representing the East Prussian constituency of Labiau-Wehlau.

At the outbreak of the Franco-Prussian War, the Prince was given command of the Second Army, and defeated the French Army of the Rhine at the Battle of Mars-la-Tour on 16 August 1870, cutting off its escape route to the west. The battle was followed by another victory at Gravelotte-St.Privat on 18 August and the encirclement and annihilation of the Army of the Rhine at the Siege of Metz. After the fall of Metz on 27 October, his army was sent to the Loire to clear the area around Orléans, where French armies, first under Aurelle de Paladines, then under Chanzy, were trying to march north to relieve Paris. He won battles at Orléans on 2 December and Le Mans from 10–12 January 1871. For his services he was promoted to the rank of Generalfeldmarschall. After the war, the Prince was made Inspector-General and was given the rank of Field Marshal of Russia by his cousin Alexander II of Russia.

He died of a heart attack at Jagdschloss Glienicke on 15 June 1885. He became the namesake of the armored cruiser SMS Friedrich Carl.

== Family ==
On 29 November 1854 at Dessau he married Princess Maria Anna of Anhalt-Dessau, daughter of Leopold IV, Duke of Anhalt. He had met her at a hunt. They had five children:

Name	Birth	Death	Notes
Princess Marie Elisabeth Luise Friederike of Prussia	14 September 1855	20 June 1888	married twice (1) Prince Henry of the Netherlands; (2) Prince Albert of Saxe-Altenburg
Princess Elisabeth Anna of Prussia	8 February 1857	28 August 1895	married Frederick Augustus II, Grand Duke of Oldenburg
Princess Anna Viktoria Charlotte Auguste Adelheid of Prussia	26 February 1858	6 May 1858	died in infancy
Princess Luise Margarete Alexandra Viktoria Agnes of Prussia	25 July 1860	14 March 1917	married Prince Arthur, Duke of Connaught and Strathearn
Prince Joachim Karl Wilhelm Friedrich Leopold of Prussia	14 November 1865	13 September 1931	married Princess Louise Sophie of Schleswig-Holstein-Sonderburg-Augustenburg

== Honours ==
He received the following decorations and awards:

German honours

- Prussia:
  - Knight of the Black Eagle, 20 March 1838; with Collar, 1847
  - Pour le Mérite (military), 16 September 1848; with Oak Leaves, 27 February 1864; Grand Cross, 20 September 1866; with Oak Leaves, 2 September 1873
  - Knight of the Red Eagle, 1st Class with Swords and Oak Leaves, 1849; Grand Cross with Swords on Ring, 18 October 1861
  - Grand Commander's Cross of the Royal House Order of Hohenzollern, 1851; with Star and Swords, 18 April 1864
  - Commander of Honour of the Johanniter Order, 1854
  - Knight of the Crown Order, 1st Class, 18 October 1861
  - Grand Cross of the Iron Cross, 22 March 1871
  - Lifesaving Medal
  - Service Award Cross
- Hohenzollern: Cross of Honour of the Princely House Order of Hohenzollern, 1st Class with Swords
- Ascanian duchies: Grand Cross of the Order of Albert the Bear, 14 February 1853; with Swords, 12 September 1864
- Baden:
  - Knight of the House Order of Fidelity, 1849
  - Grand Cross of the Zähringer Lion, 1849
  - Commander of the Military Karl-Friedrich Merit Order, 1849; Grand Cross, 1871
- Bavaria:
  - Knight of St. Hubert, 1853
  - Grand Cross of the Military Order of Max Joseph, 18 October 1870
- Brunswick: Grand Cross of the Order of Henry the Lion
- (Saxe-Coburg and Gotha) (Duchy of Saxe-Altenburg) (Saxe-Meiningen) Ernestine duchies: Grand Cross of the Saxe-Ernestine House Order, November 1854
- Hanover:
  - Grand Cross of the Royal Guelphic Order, 1847
  - Knight of St. George, 1864
- Hesse-Kassel: Grand Cross of the Golden Lion, 22 May 1850
- Hesse-Darmstadt:
  - Grand Cross of the Ludwig Order, 20 December 1846
  - Military Merit Cross, 22 March 1871
- Lippe-Detmold: Military Merit Medal
- Mecklenburg:
  - Grand Cross of the Wendish Crown, with Crown in Ore
  - Cross for Distinction in War (Strelitz)
- Oldenburg: Grand Cross of the Order of Duke Peter Friedrich Ludwig, with Golden Crown, 18 September 1861; with Swords, 7 September 1870
- Saxe-Weimar-Eisenach: Grand Cross of the White Falcon, 26 November 1845
- Saxony:
  - Knight of the Rue Crown, 1867
  - Grand Cross of the Military Order of St. Henry, 1870
- Schaumburg-Lippe: Military Merit Medal
- Württemberg: Grand Cross of the Military Merit Order, 30 December 1870

Foreign honours

- Austrian Empire:
  - Grand Cross of the Royal Hungarian Order of St. Stephen, 1852
  - Commander of the Military Order of Maria Theresa, 1864
- Belgium: Grand Cordon of the Order of Leopold (military), 25 April 1867
- Kingdom of Greece: Grand Cross of the Redeemer
- Kingdom of Hawaii: Grand Cross of the Order of Kalākaua, 1881
- Kingdom of Italy:
  - Gold Medal of Military Valour, 3 July 1866
  - Knight of the Annunciation, 13 January 1867
  - Grand Cross of the Military Order of Savoy
- Netherlands:
  - Grand Cross of the Military William Order, 23 August 1878
  - Grand Cross of the Netherlands Lion
- Ottoman Empire:
  - Order of the Medjidie, 1st Class in Diamonds
  - Order of Osmanieh, 1st Class in Diamonds
- (Tunisia) Beylik of Tunis: Husainid Family Order
- Russian Empire:
  - Knight of St. Andrew, 1838
  - Knight of St. Alexander Nevsky
  - Knight of the White Eagle
  - Knight of St. Anna, 1st Class
  - Knight of St. Stanislaus, 1st class
  - Knight of St. George, 4th Class, 22 June 1849; 2nd Class, 1 July 1870
- United Principalities of Romania: Grand Cross of the Star of Romania
- (Thailand) Siam: Knight of the Order of the Royal House of Chakri
- Spain: Knight of the Golden Fleece, 12 November 1871
- Sweden-Norway: Knight of the Seraphim, 19 July 1874
- United Kingdom: Honorary Grand Cross of the Bath (military), 3 July 1878

== Ancestry ==
Ancestors of Prince Friedrich Karl of Prussia (1828–1885)

8. Frederick William II of Prussia
4. Frederick William III of Prussia
9. Princess Frederica Louisa of Hesse-Darmstadt
2. Prince Charles of Prussia
10. Charles II, Grand Duke of Mecklenburg-Strelitz
5. Duchess Louise of Mecklenburg-Strelitz
11. Princess Friederike of Hesse-Darmstadt
1. Prince Frederick Charles of Prussia
12. Charles Augustus, Grand Duke of Saxe-Weimar-Eisenach
6. Charles Frederick, Grand Duke of Saxe-Weimar-Eisenach
13. Princess Louise of Hesse-Darmstadt
3. Princess Marie of Saxe-Weimar-Eisenach
14. Paul I of Russia
7. Grand Duchess Maria Pavlovna of Russia
15. Duchess Sophie Dorothea of Württemburg

== Bibliography ==
- Wagner, Arthur Lockwood (1899). The Campaign of Königgrätz: A Study of the Austro-Prussian Conflict in the Light of the American Civil War.
- Moltke, Helmuth von (1867). The Campaign of 1866 in Germany.
- Geoffrey, Wawro (1997). The Austro-Prussian War: Austria's War with Prussia and Italy in 1866. Cambridge University Press. ISBN 978-0-521-62951-5.
