= Princess Maria Anna of Anhalt-Dessau =

Princess Maria Anna
- Princess Friedrich Karl of Prussia
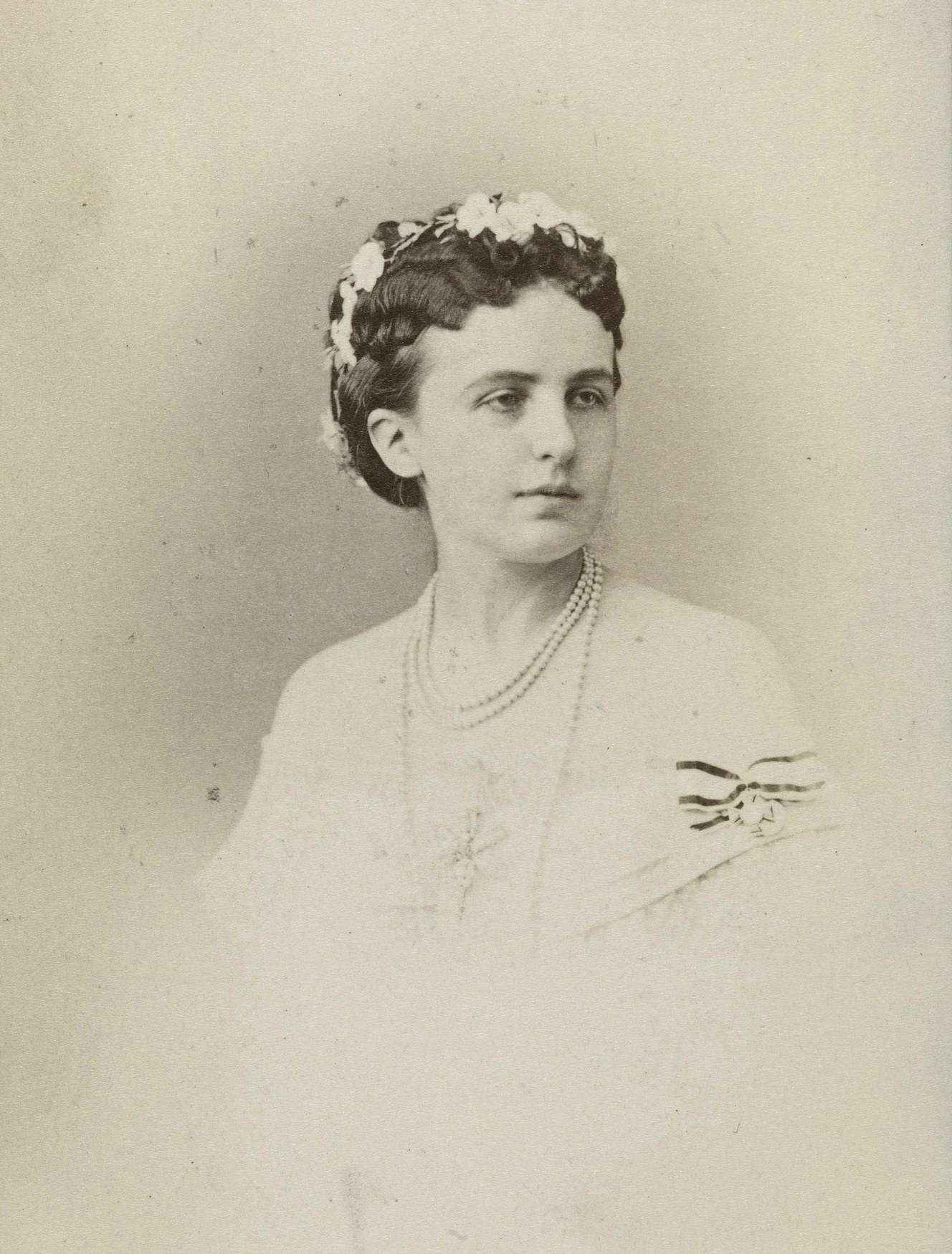
- Maria Anna in 1872
- Born: 14 September 1837; Dessau, Duchy of Anhalt
- Died: 12 May 1906 (aged 68); Friedrichroda, German Empire
- Spouse: Prince Friedrich Karl of Prussia (m. 1854; died 1885)
- Issue: Marie, Princess Henry of the Netherlands; Elisabeth, Hereditary Grand Duchess of Oldenburg; Princess Anna; Princess Louise Margaret, Duchess of Connaught and Strathearn; Prince Friedrich Leopold
- House: Ascania
- Father: Leopold IV, Duke of Anhalt
- Mother: Princess Frederica of Prussia

Princess Maria Anna of Anhalt-Dessau (14 September 1837 – 12 May 1906) was a princess from the House of Ascania. She was the third child of Leopold IV, Duke of Anhalt and Princess Frederica of Prussia.

== Family ==
Maria Anna's paternal grandparents were Frederick, Hereditary Prince of Anhalt-Dessau and Landgravine Amalie of Hesse-Homburg. Her maternal grandparents were Prince Louis Charles of Prussia (brother of King Frederick William III of Prussia) and Frederica of Mecklenburg-Strelitz.

Maria Anna was a younger sister of Frederick I, Duke of Anhalt and Agnes, Duchess of Saxe-Altenburg.

== Marriage and issue ==
On 29 November 1854, she married her second cousin Prince Frederick Charles of Prussia. He was a grandson of Frederick William III of Prussia by his father Prince Charles of Prussia. They had five children:

Name	Birth	Death	Notes
Princess Marie Elisabeth Luise Friederike of Prussia	1855	1888	married twice (1) Prince Henry of the Netherlands; (2) Prince Albert of Saxe-Altenburg
Princess Elisabeth Anna of Prussia	1857	1895	married Frederick Augustus II, Grand Duke of Oldenburg
Princess Anna Victoria Charlotte Augusta Adelheid of Prussia	1858	1858	
Princess Luise Margarete Alexandra Victoria Agnes of Prussia	1860	1917	married Prince Arthur, Duke of Connaught and Strathearn
Prince Joachim Carl Wilhelm Friedrich Leopold of Prussia	1865	1931	married Princess Louise Sophie of Schleswig-Holstein-Sonderburg-Augustenburg

Their marriage was unhappy. After the birth of their fourth daughter, Prince Frederick Charles reportedly beat his wife for not producing a son. According to one source, it was only by the entreaties of Emperor Wilhelm I that a separation never occurred.

Maria Anna was considered by contemporaries to be one of the loveliest women of her generation. She possessed a remarkable talent for music and painting, and often advised young girls when they first entered society. Maria Anna was almost completely deaf, which according to her friend Princess Catherine Radziwill, "caused her to show extreme timidity and embarrassment whenever she found herself in company". Radziwill went on to say however that "when [Maria Anna] was alone with you, and not disturbed by the noise of many conversations around her, she became quite charming, and really witty".

== Later life ==
Her husband Prince Frederick Charles died on 15 June 1885. After his death, Maria Anna left Berlin for Italy, staying mainly in Naples, Rome, and Florence. Rumors soon emerged that Maria Anna contracted a morganatic marriage to Capt. von Wagenheim, one of her equerries.

In 1889, their only son Prince Frederick married Princess Louise Sophie of Schleswig-Holstein-Sonderburg-Augustenburg, a sister of Empress Augusta Viktoria. Maria Anna died on 12 May 1906 in Friedrichroda.

== Ancestry ==
Ancestors of Princess Maria Anna of Anhalt-Dessau

8. Leopold III, Duke of Anhalt-Dessau
4. Frederick, Hereditary Prince of Anhalt-Dessau
9. Margravine Louise of Brandenburg-Schwedt
2. Leopold IV, Duke of Anhalt
10. Frederick V, Landgrave of Hesse-Homburg
5. Princess Amalie of Hesse-Homburg
11. Princess Caroline of Hesse-Darmstadt
1. Princess Maria Anna of Anhalt-Dessau
12. Frederick William II of Prussia
6. Prince Louis Charles of Prussia
13. Princess Frederica Louisa of Hesse-Darmstadt
3. Princess Frederica of Prussia
14. Charles II, Grand Duke of Mecklenburg-Strelitz
7. Duchess Frederica of Mecklenburg-Strelitz
15. Princess Friederike of Hesse-Darmstadt

== Sources ==
- Radziwill, Catherine (1915). Memories of Forty Years. London: Funk & Wagnalls Company.
