= Princess Louise Margaret of Prussia =

Duchess of Connaught and Strathearn (1860–1917)

Princess Louise Margaret
- Duchess of Connaught and Strathearn
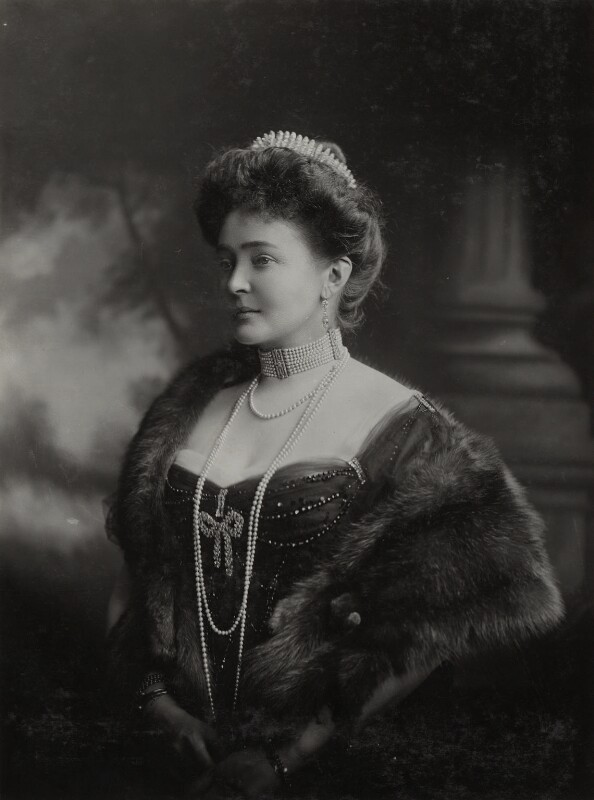
- Photograph by James Lafayette, 1907

Viceregal consort of Canada
- In office 13 October 1911 – 11 November 1916
- Monarch: George V
- Preceded by: The Countess Grey
- Succeeded by: The Duchess of Devonshire
- Governor General: The Duke of Connaught and Strathearn
- Born: 25 July 1860; Marmorpalais, Potsdam, Kingdom of Prussia
- Died: 14 March 1917 (aged 56); Clarence House, London, England, United Kingdom
- Burial: 19 March 1917; Royal Vault, St George's Chapel, Windsor Castle; 23 October 1928; Royal Burial Ground, Frogmore
- Spouse: Prince Arthur, Duke of Connaught and Strathearn (m. 1879)
- Issue: Margareta, Crown Princess of Sweden; Prince Arthur of Connaught; Lady Patricia Ramsay
Names
- English: Louise Margaret Alexandra Victoria Agnes; German: Luise Margarete Alexandra Viktoria Agnes
- House: Hohenzollern
- Father: Prince Frederick Charles of Prussia
- Mother: Princess Maria Anna of Anhalt-Dessau
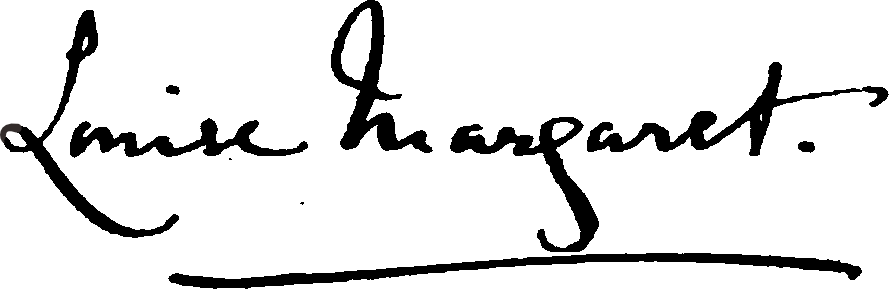
- Signature

Princess Louise Margaret of Prussia (Louise Margaret Alexandra Victoria Agnes; 25 July 1860 – 14 March 1917), later Duchess of Connaught and Strathearn, was a member of the House of Hohenzollern who married into the British royal family. She served as the viceregal consort of Canada while her husband, Prince Arthur, Duke of Connaught and Strathearn, served as the governor general, from 1911 to 1916.

== Early life ==
Princess Louise Margaret was born at Marmorpalais (Marble Palace) near Potsdam, Kingdom of Prussia. Her father was Prince Friedrich Karl of Prussia (1828–1885), the son of Karl of Prussia (1801–1883) and Princess Marie of Saxe-Weimar-Eisenach (1808–1877). Her mother was Princess Maria Anna of Anhalt (1837–1906), daughter of Leopold IV of Anhalt-Dessau. Louise Margaret's father, a nephew of German Emperor William I, distinguished himself as a field commander during the Battle of Metz and the campaigns west of Paris in the 1870–71 Franco-Prussian War.

Louise's parents were estranged because of her father's alcoholism and domineering behaviour. Though they were never officially separated, they lived apart. Queen Victoria wrote in a letter that the prince had "behaved so brutally to his wife". After the birth of Louise, their fourth daughter born in a row, her father reportedly beat his wife for not producing a son (by some accounts, immediately after the birth).

== Marriage ==
On 13 March 1879, Princess Louise Margaret married Prince Arthur, Duke of Connaught and Strathearn at St. George's Chapel Windsor. Prince Arthur was the seventh child and third son of Queen Victoria and Prince Albert of Saxe-Coburg and Gotha. A 2003 book claims that it was a love match, with the princess also keen to get away from her royal residence in Berlin and from her father's bullying.

The wedding was described as grand and the couple received a great number of expensive gifts; the Queen's gifts included a diamond tiara and a pearl and diamond pendant. Many members of Britain and Germany's royal families attended. Queen Victoria herself was wearing the Koh-i-Noor diamond and a long white veil. After her marriage, Princess Louise was styled Her Royal Highness The Duchess of Connaught and Strathearn, and her name was Anglicised as Louise Margaret.

The couple had three children: Princess Margaret (1882–1920), Prince Arthur (1883–1938), and Princess Patricia (1886–1974). Princess Margaret married the future King Gustaf VI Adolf of Sweden and is the grandmother of both King Carl XVI Gustaf of Sweden and Queen Margrethe II of Denmark. Prince Arthur served as the governor-general of South Africa.

== Duchess of Connaught ==
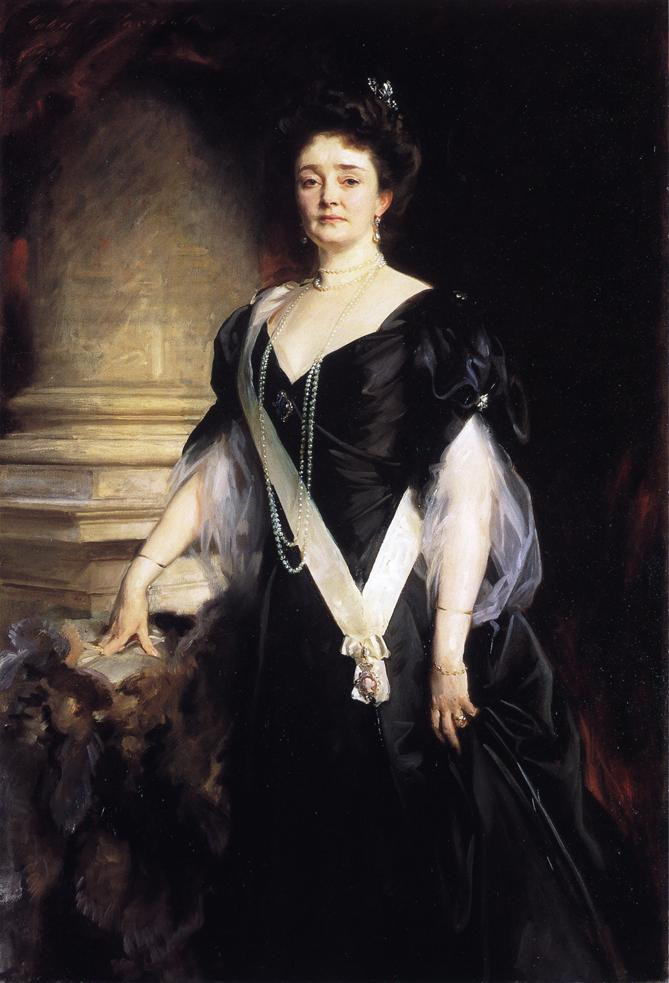
Louise, Duchess of Connaught, John Singer Sargent, 1908

The Duchess of Connaught spent the first twenty years of her marriage accompanying her husband on his various deployments throughout the British Empire. The Duke and Duchess of Connaught acquired Bagshot Park in Surrey as their country home and after 1900 used Clarence House as their London residence. She accompanied her husband to Canada in 1911, when he began his term as governor-general. In 1916, she became colonel-in-chief of the 199th Canadian (Overseas) Infantry Battalion (The Duchess of Connaught's Own Irish-Canadian Rangers), CEF after Harry Trihey, the regiment's principal organizer and first commanding officer during World War I, secured her as patron. In 1885, she became chief of the 64th (8th Brandenburg) Regiment of Infantry "Field Marshal General Prince Friedrich Karl of Prussia", Prussian Army.

== Death and legacy ==
The Duchess of Connaught died of influenza and bronchitis at Clarence House. She became the first member of the British royal family to be cremated. This was done at Golders Green Crematorium. The procedure of burying ashes in an urn was still unfamiliar at the time, and her urn was transported in an ordinary coffin during the funeral ceremonies. King George V still ordered four weeks of mourning dress and a military guard of honor during the funeral. Her ashes were placed in the Royal Vault at St George's Chapel, Windsor Castle and eventually buried at the Royal Burial Ground, Frogmore. The Duke of Connaught survived her by almost twenty-five years.

The Duchess of Connaught's net estate in the United Kingdom was valued at £123,008; she left £25,000 to her daughter Princess Margaret and £50,000 to her daughter Princess Patricia of Connaught, noting that £25,000 had already been settled on Princess Margaret upon her marriage. The residuary estate was left to her son Prince Arthur of Connaught.

The maternity hospital adjacent to the Cambridge Military Hospital at Aldershot was named in her honor as the Louise Margaret Maternity Hospital. She laid the foundation stone of this hospital, which was constructed for the wives and children of the Aldershot Garrison.

== Titles, styles, honours and arms ==
=== Titles and styles ===
- 25 July 1860 – 13 March 1879: Her Royal Highness Princess Louise Margaret of Prussia
- 13 March 1879 – 14 March 1917: Her Royal Highness The Duchess of Connaught and Strathearn

=== Honours ===
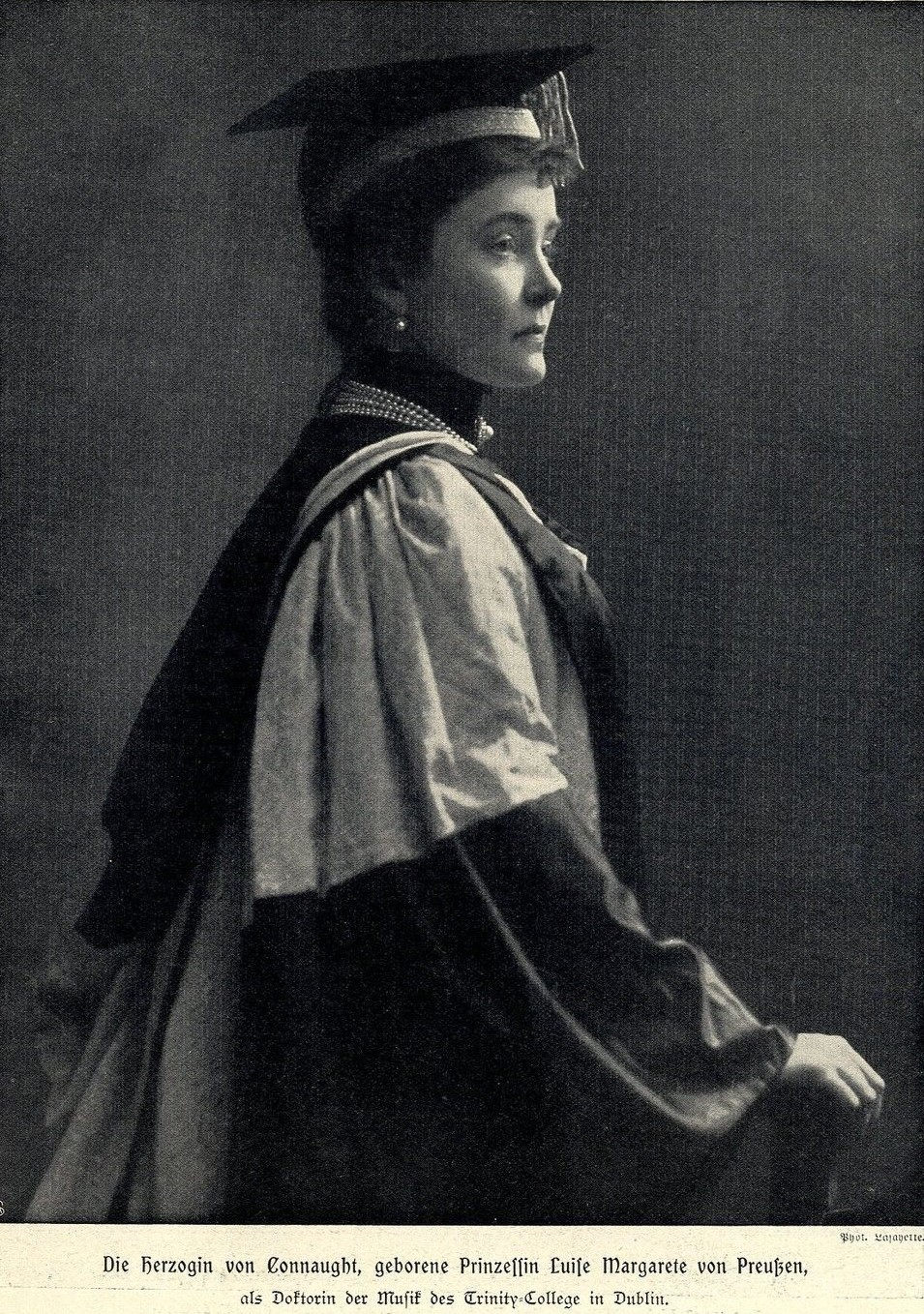
Louise Margaret in academic dress, 1904

Orders and decorations

- CI: Companion of the Crown of India, March 1879
- VA: Royal Order of Victoria and Albert, 1st Class, 1893
- DStJ: Lady of Justice of St. John, 1888
- RRC: Member of the Royal Red Cross, 1883
- Empire of Japan: Grand Cordon of the Precious Crown, 8 May 1890

Academic

- Doctor of Music, Trinity College Dublin, 1904

=== Arms ===

Coat of arms of Princess Louise Margaret of Prussia, Duchess of Connaught

== Issue ==
| Image | Name | Birth | Death | Notes |
|---|---|---|---|---|
| | Princess Margaret of Connaught | 15 January 1882 | 1 May 1920 | married, 15 June 1905, Crown Prince Gustaf Adolf of Sweden; had issue (including Ingrid, Queen of Denmark) |
| | Prince Arthur of Connaught | 13 January 1883 | 12 September 1938 | married, 15 October 1913, Princess Alexandra, 2nd Duchess of Fife; had issue |
| | Princess Patricia of Connaught | 17 March 1886 | 12 January 1974 | married, 27 February 1919, Captain Sir Alexander Ramsay, renouncing her title and becoming Lady Patricia Ramsay; had issue |

== Ancestry ==
Ancestors of Princess Louise Margaret of Prussia

8. Frederick William III of Prussia
4. Prince Charles of Prussia
9. Duchess Louise of Mecklenburg-Strelitz
2. Prince Frederick Charles of Prussia
10. Charles Frederick, Grand Duke of Saxe-Weimar-Eisenach
5. Princess Marie of Saxe-Weimar-Eisenach
11. Grand Duchess Maria Pavlovna of Russia
1. Princess Louise Margaret of Prussia
12. Frederick, Hereditary Prince of Anhalt-Dessau
6. Leopold IV, Duke of Anhalt
13. Princess Amalie of Hesse-Homburg
3. Princess Maria Anna of Anhalt-Dessau
14. Prince Louis Charles of Prussia
7. Princess Frederica of Prussia
15. Duchess Frederica of Mecklenburg-Strelitz

Princess Louise Margaret of Prussia House of Hohenzollern Born: 25 July 1860 Died: 14 March 1917
Honorary titles
| Preceded by The Countess Grey | Viceregal consort of Canada; 1911–1916 | Succeeded by The Duchess of Devonshire |
