= Frederick of Hesse =

Frederick of Hesse, Frederik of Hesse, or Friedrich of Hesse may refer to:

- Frederick of Hesse-Darmstadt (1616–1682), German soldier
- Frederick, Landgrave of Hesse-Eschwege (1617–1655)
- Frederick I of Sweden (1676–1751), Landgrave of Hesse-Kassel (r. 1730–1751)
- Frederick II, Landgrave of Hesse (1720–1785; r. 1760–1785)
- Prince Frederick of Hesse (1747–1837), Danish general and youngest son of Frederick II, Landgrave of Hesse
- Prince Frederik of Hesse (1771–1845), Danish general and grandson of Frederick II, Landgrave of Hesse
- Prince Frederick William of Hesse-Kassel (1820–1884), great-grandson of Frederick II, Landgrave of Hesse
- Prince Frederick Charles of Hesse (1868–1940), King-elect of Finland in 1918
- Prince Friedrich of Hesse and by Rhine (1870–1873), youngest son of Louis IV, Grand Duke of Hesse

== See also ==
- Frederick William, Elector of Hesse (1802–1875; r. 1847–1866)
- Frederick William III, Landgrave of Hesse (1854–1888), titular elector of Hesse-Kassel
- Prince Alexander Frederick of Hesse (1863–1945), Head of the House of Hesse from 1888 to 1925
- King Frederick (disambiguation)
- Prince Frederick (disambiguation)
- Frederica Louisa of Hesse-Darmstadt (1751–1805), queen consort of Frederick William II, King of Prussia
- Princess Friederike of Hesse-Darmstadt (1752–1782), first wife of Charles II, Grand Duke of Mecklenburg-Strelitz
