= Frederick William III, Landgrave of Hesse =

Frederick William III
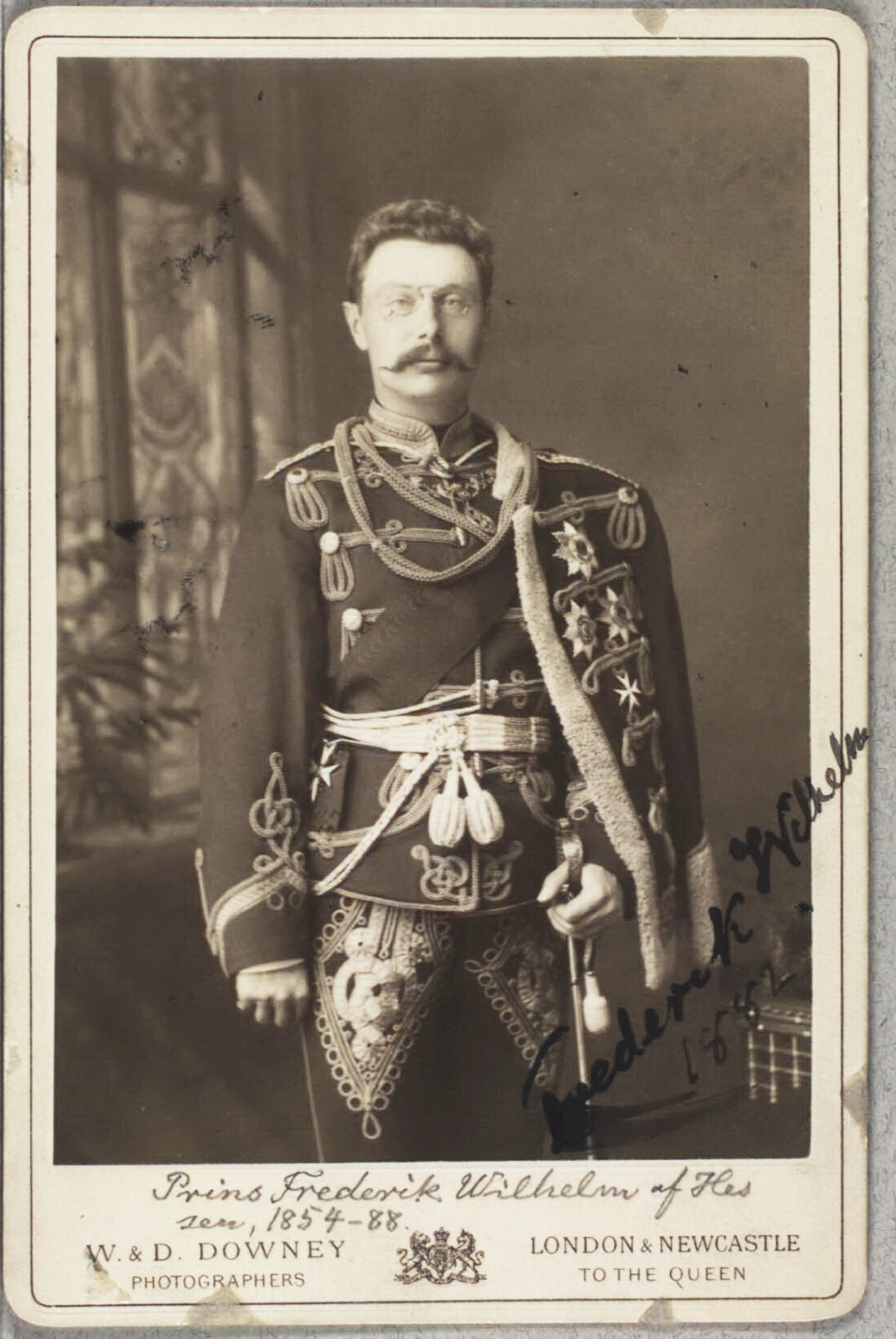
- Photograph by W. & D. Downey, c. 1884

Head of the House of Hesse-Kassel
- Tenure: 14 October 1884 – 14 October 1888
- Predecessor: Frederick William II
- Successor: Alexander Friedrich
- Born: 15 October 1854; Copenhagen
- Died: 14 October 1888 (aged 33) at sea between Batavia and Singapore
- House: House of Hesse
- Father: Frederick William of Hesse
- Mother: Princess Anna of Prussia

Frederick William (III), Landgrave of Hesse-Kassel (German: Friedrich Wilhelm Nikolaus Karl, 15 October 1854 – 14 October 1888) was (titular) Elector of Hesse-Kassel.

== Early life ==
He was the eldest son of Frederick William George Adolph of Hesse-Kassel-Rumpenheim and his second wife Princess Anna of Prussia. His father's first wife was Alexandra Nikolaevna of Russia, daughter of Emperor Nicholas I of Russia but she died in childbirth delivering a son who also died. From his parents marriage, his siblings were Princess Elisabeth (who married Leopold, Hereditary Prince of Anhalt), Prince Alexander Frederick (who married Baroness Gisela Stockhorner von Starheim), Prince Frederick Charles of Hesse (who married Princess Margaret of Prussia), Princess Marie-Polyxene (who died young), and Princess Sybille (who married Friedrich Alexander Henry Robert Carl Albert, Baron von Vincke).

His father was the only son of Wilhelm I, Landgrave of Hesse-Kassel-Rumpenheim and Princess Louise Charlotte of Denmark. His maternal grandparents were Prince Charles of Prussia and Princess Marie of Saxe-Weimar-Eisenach.

Like his father he was raised in Denmark.

== Landgrave of Hesse ==
His father died in 1884, and he inherited the title of Landgrave which provided an allowance of £25,000 a year from the German government in addition to his extensive estates in Holstein and Hesse Castle.

== Death ==
Frederick William III died on 14 October 1888 during a trip aboard the steamship Volga from Batavia to Singapore. He was traveling with Barons von Hugo, von Trott and von der Schulenburg. According to his obituary he died:

"under circumstances that leave no room for doubt whatever as to the death of his Royal Highness. His Royal Highness, who had been a long time traveling in the tropics, had in the course of his wanderings reached Java. The only possible conclusion which could be come to was that, overcome by some sudden mental disturbance, to which his previous illness may have made him susceptible, his Royal Highness had, quite unconscious of what he was doing, gone through the port of his cabin, and had dropped into the sea. He could not merely have fallen through, as the window was so narrow that a person could only pass through by dint of some exertion. The idea of premeditated suicide is entirely without foundation."

As was not married and had no children, he was succeeded by his brother, Alexander Frederick, who was an accomplished musician despite being nearly blind. Upon his brother and heir's morganatic marriage in 1925, he abdicated in favor of their younger brother, Prince Frederick Charles of Hesse, who had been elected King of Finland in 1918 but renounced the throne two months later. Prince Frederick married Princess Margaret of Prussia, youngest sister of Kaiser Wilhelm II and a granddaughter of Queen Victoria of Great Britain.

== Honours and awards ==
He received the following awards:

- Grand Duchy of Hesse:
  - Grand Cross of the Ludwig Order, 10 September 1871
  - Knight of the Golden Lion, 12 October 1875
- Kingdom of Prussia:
  - Knight of the Black Eagle, with Collar, 26 January 1877
  - Grand Cross of the Red Eagle
  - Knight of Honour of the Johanniter Order, 18 February 1880
- Duchy of Anhalt: Grand Cross of Albert the Bear
- Denmark: Knight of the Elephant, 2 October 1871
- Kingdom of Greece: Grand Cross of the Redeemer
- Mecklenburg: Grand Cross of the Wendish Crown, with Crown in Ore
- (Duchy of Nassau) Nassau Ducal Family: Knight of the Gold Lion of Nassau
- Oldenburg: Grand Cross of the Order of Duke Peter Friedrich Ludwig, with Golden Crown, 24 September 1877
- Ottoman Empire: Order of Osmanieh, 1st Class
- Russian Empire: Knight of St. Alexander Nevsky
- Württemberg: Grand Cross of the Württemberg Crown, 1875

== Ancestors ==
Ancestors of Frederick William III, Landgrave of Hesse

16. Frederick II, Landgrave of Hesse-Kassel
8. Prince Frederick of Hesse-Kassel
17. Princess Mary of Great Britain
4. Prince William of Hesse-Kassel
18. Charles William, Prince of Nassau-Usingen
9. Princess Caroline of Nassau-Usingen
19. Countess Caroline Felizitas of Leiningen-Dagsburg
2. Prince Frederick William of Hesse-Kassel
20. Frederick V of Denmark
10. Frederick, Hereditary Prince of Denmark and Norway
21. Juliana Maria of Brunswick-Wolfenbüttel
5. Princess Louise Charlotte of Denmark
22. Duke Louis of Mecklenburg-Schwerin
11. Duchess Sophia Frederica of Mecklenburg-Schwerin
23. Princess Charlotte Sophie of Saxe-Coburg-Saalfeld
1. Frederick William III of Hesse
24. Frederick William II of Prussia
12. Frederick William III of Prussia
25. Frederika Louisa of Hesse-Darmstadt
6. Prince Charles of Prussia
26. Charles II, Grand Duke of Mecklenburg-Strelitz
13. Louise of Mecklenburg-Strelitz
27. Princess Friederike of Hesse-Darmstadt
3. Princess Anna of Prussia
28. Charles Augustus, Grand Duke of Saxe-Weimar-Eisenach
14. Charles Frederick, Grand Duke of Saxe-Weimar-Eisenach
29. Princess Louise of Hesse-Darmstadt
7. Princess Marie of Saxe-Weimar-Eisenach
30. Paul I of Russia
15. Grand Duchess Maria Pavlovna of Russia
31. Sophie Dorothea of Württemburg

Titles in pretence
Preceded by Frederick William II	— TITULAR — Elector of Hesse; 1884–1888	Succeeded by Alexander Frederick
