= Frederick of Denmark =

Frederick of Denmark or Frederik of Denmark may refer to:

== Kings ==
- Frederick I of Denmark (1471–1533; r. 1523–1533), King of Denmark
- Frederick II of Denmark (1534–1588; r. 1559–1588), King of Denmark
- Frederick III of Denmark (1609–1670; r. 1648–1670), King of Denmark
- Frederik IV (1671–1730; r. 1699–1730), King of Denmark
- Frederick V of Denmark (1723–1766; r. 1746–1766), King of Denmark
- Frederik VI (1768–1839; r. 1808–1839), King of Denmark
- Frederik VII (1808–1863; r. 1848–1863), King of Denmark
- Frederick VIII of Denmark (1843–1912; r. 1906–1912), King of Denmark
- Frederik IX (1899–1972; r. 1947–1972), King of Denmark
- Frederik X (born 1968; r. 2024–present), King of Denmark

== Other people ==
- Frederick of Denmark (bishop) (1532–1556), Prince-Bishop of Hildesheim and Bishop of Schleswig
- Frederick, Hereditary Prince of Denmark (1753–1805), son of Frederick V of Denmark and regent of Christian VII

== See also ==
- Frederick, Crown Prince of Denmark (disambiguation)
- King Frederick (disambiguation)
- Prince Frederick (disambiguation)
