= Alexander Frederick, Landgrave of Hesse =

Prussian prince

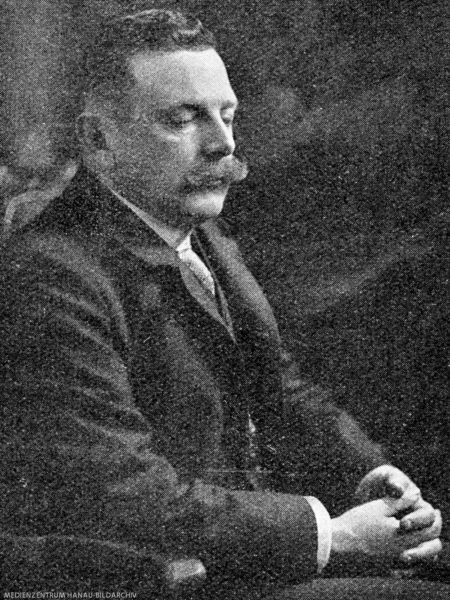
- Alexander Frederick, circa 1890

Head of the House of Hesse
- Tenure: 14 October 1888 – 16 March 1925
- Predecessor: Frederick William III
- Successor: Frederick Charles
- Born: 25 January 1863; Copenhagen, Denmark
- Died: 26 March 1945 (aged 82); Fronhausen-an-der-Lahn, Nazi Germany
- Spouse: Gisela Stockhorner von Starein (m. 1925)
Names
- Alexander Friedrich Wilhelm Albrecht Georg
- House: Hesse
- Father: Frederick William, Landgrave of Hesse
- Mother: Princess Anna of Prussia

Alexander Frederick, Landgrave of Hesse (German: Alexander Friedrich Wilhelm Albrecht Georg Landgraf von Hessen, 25 January 1863 – 26 March 1945) was a German prince of the House of Hesse.

== Biography ==
He was the son of Prince Frederick William of Hesse-Kassel and Princess Anna of Prussia. From 1888 to 1925 he was Head of the electoral line of the House of Hesse, but abdicated his position to his brother Prince Frederick Charles of Hesse, on 16 March 1925. He was born with a visual impairment, and this disability, in addition to his morganatic marriage, played a part in his decision to abdicate.

On 25 March 1925, he married morganatically Baroness Gisela Stockhorner von Starheim, daughter of Otto, Baron Stockhorner von Starheim and Baroness Emilie Susanne Hildegard von Wolzogen-Neuhaus.< She was court lady of Grand Duchess Hilda of Baden.

== Honours ==
He received the following orders and decorations:

- Grand Duchy of Hesse:
  - Knight of the Golden Lion, 3 August 1880
  - Grand Cross of the Ludwig Order, 6 January 1882
- Baden:
  - Knight of the House Order of Fidelity, 1890
  - Knight of the Order of Berthold the First, 1890
- Kingdom of Bavaria: Knight of St. Hubert, 1892
- (Saxe-Coburg and Gotha) (Duchy of Saxe-Altenburg) (Saxe-Meiningen) Ernestine duchies: Grand Cross of the Saxe-Ernestine House Order
- Oldenburg: Grand Cross of the Order of Duke Peter Friedrich Ludwig, with Golden Crown
- Kingdom of Prussia:
  - Knight of the Black Eagle, 24 December 1892; with Collar, 17 January 1893
  - Grand Cross of the Red Eagle
  - Knight of Honour of the Johanniter Order
- Württemberg: Grand Cross of the Württemberg Crown, 1891
- Duchy of Anhalt: Grand Cross of the Order of Albert the Bear, 1884
- Denmark:
  - Knight of the Elephant, 29 October 1884
  - Cross of Honour of the Order of the Dannebrog, 24 October 1909
- Kingdom of Greece: Grand Cross of the Redeemer
- Ottoman Empire: Order of Osmanieh, 1st Class
- United Kingdom: Honorary Grand Cross of the Royal Victorian Order, 10 June 1907
- Mecklenburg: Grand Cross of the Wendish Crown, with Crown in Ore, 10 August 1912

== Ancestors ==
Ancestors of Alexander Frederick, Landgrave of Hesse

16. Frederick II, Landgrave of Hesse-Kassel
8. Prince Frederick of Hesse-Kassel
17. Princess Mary of Great Britain
4. Prince William of Hesse-Kassel
18. Charles William, Prince of Nassau-Usingen
9. Princess Caroline of Nassau-Usingen
19. Countess Caroline Felizitas of Leiningen-Dagsburg
2. Prince Frederick William of Hesse-Kassel
20. Frederick V of Denmark
10. Frederick, Hereditary Prince of Denmark and Norway
21. Juliana Maria of Brunswick-Wolfenbüttel
5. Princess Louise Charlotte of Denmark
22. Duke Louis of Mecklenburg-Schwerin
11. Duchess Sophia Frederica of Mecklenburg-Schwerin
23. Princess Charlotte Sophie of Saxe-Coburg-Saalfeld
1. Alexander Frederick, Landgrave of Hesse
24. Frederick William II of Prussia
12. Frederick William III of Prussia
25. Frederika Louisa of Hesse-Darmstadt
6. Prince Charles of Prussia
26. Charles II, Grand Duke of Mecklenburg-Strelitz
13. Louise of Mecklenburg-Strelitz
27. Princess Friederike of Hesse-Darmstadt
3. Princess Anna of Prussia
28. Charles Augustus, Grand Duke of Saxe-Weimar-Eisenach
14. Charles Frederick, Grand Duke of Saxe-Weimar-Eisenach
29. Princess Louise of Hesse-Darmstadt
7. Princess Marie of Saxe-Weimar-Eisenach
30. Paul I of Russia
15. Grand Duchess Maria Pavlovna of Russia
31. Sophie Dorothea of Württemburg

Alexander Frederick, Landgrave of Hesse House of Hesse Born: 1 May 1868 Died: 26 March 1945
Regnal titles
Preceded by Frederick William III	Head of the House of Hesse	Succeeded by Frederick Charles
Titles in pretence
Preceded by Frederick William III	— TITULAR — Elector of Hesse	Succeeded by Frederick Charles
