= Schoppe =

Schoppe is a surname. Notable people with the surname include:

- Amalie Schoppe (1791–1858), German author
- Caspar Schoppe (1576–1649), German scholar
- James L. Schoppe, American production designer
- Julius Schoppe, German painter
- Martin Schoppe, German musicologist and painter
