= Prince Frederick =

Prince Frederick, Frederik or Friedrich may refer to:

== People ==
- Friedrich Ludwig, Hereditary Prince of Württemberg (1698–1731), son of Duke Eberhard Ludwig of Württemberg
- Frédéric Prinz von Anhalt (born 1943), German-American socialite
- Frederick III of Denmark (1609–1670), son of Christian IV of Denmark and Anne Catherine of Brandenburg
- Frederick VIII of Denmark (1843–1912), son of Christian IX of Denmark
- Frederik IX of Denmark (1899–1972), son of Christian X and father of Margaret II of Denmark
- Frederik X of Denmark (born 1968), son of Queen Margrethe II and her husband, Prince Consort Henrik
- Frederick Henry, Prince of Orange (1584–1647), Stadtholder of Holland
- Frederick, Hereditary Prince of Anhalt-Dessau (1769–1814), son of Leopold III, Duke of Anhalt-Dessau
- Frederick, Prince of Anhalt-Harzgerode (1613–1670)
- Frederick, Hereditary Prince of Denmark (1753–1805), son of Frederick V of Denmark
- Frederick, Prince of Wales (1707–1751), son of George II, later Prince of Wales
- Prince Frederick, Duke of York and Albany (1763–1827), son of George III, later Duke of York
- Prince Frederick of Great Britain (1750–1765), son of Frederick, Prince of Wales
- Prince Friedrich of Hesse and by Rhine (1870–1873), son of Grand Duke Louis IV
- Prince Frederik of Hesse (1771–1845), Governor-general of Norway.
- Prince Frederick of Hesse-Kassel (1747–1837), youngest son of Prince Frederick (1720–1785)
- Frederick, Prince of Hohenzollern (1891–1965), son of Prince William
- Prince Frederick of Hohenzollern-Sigmaringen (1843–1904), son of Prince Charles Anthony of Hohenzollern
- Prince Frederik of Nassau (2002–2025), son of Prince Robert of Luxembourg
- Prince Frederick of Orange-Nassau (1774–1799), son of Prince William V
- Prince Frederick of Prussia (1794–1863), son of Prince Louis Charles of Prussia
- Prince Frederick of Prussia (1911–1966), son of Crown Prince Wilhelm of Germany
- Prince Friedrich of Saxe-Meiningen (1861–1914), son of Duke Georg II
- Prince Frederick of Schaumburg-Lippe (1868–1945), son of Prince William
- Prince Frederick of Schleswig-Holstein-Sonderburg-Augustenburg (1800–1865), son of Duke Frederick Christian II
- Prince Frederik of the Netherlands (1797–1881), second son of King William I of the Netherlands
- Prince Frederick of Württemberg (1808–1870), son of Prince Paul
- Prince Frederick Adolf, Duke of Östergötland (1750–1803), son of King Adolf Frederick
- Prince Frederick Augustus of Anhalt-Dessau (1799–1864), son of Frederick, Hereditary Prince of Anhalt-Dessau
- Frederick Augustus, Prince of Anhalt-Zerbst (1734–1793)
- Prince Frederick Charles of Hesse (1868–1940), son of Prince Frederick William of Hesse-Kassel and briefly King of Finland
- Prince Frederick Charles of Prussia (1801–1883), son of King Frederick William III
- Prince Friedrich Christian of Schaumburg-Lippe (1906–1983), son of Prince Georg
- Prince Frederick Ferdinand Constantin of Saxe-Weimar-Eisenach (1758–1793), son of Duke Ernest Augustus II
- Prince Friedrich Franz Xaver of Hohenzollern-Hechingen (1757–1844), an Austrian general
- Prince Friedrich Heinrich Albrecht of Prussia, (1874–1940), son of Prince Albert (1837–1906)
- Prince Frederick Henry Eugen of Anhalt-Dessau (1707–1781), son of Prince Leopold I
- Prince Friedrich Karl of Prussia (1828–1885), son of Prince Charles
- Prince Friedrich Karl of Prussia (1893–1917), son of Prince Friedrich Leopold
- Prince Friedrich Leopold of Prussia (1865–1931), son of Prince Friedrich Karl (1828–1885)
- Prince Friedrich Leopold of Prussia (1895–1959), son of Prince Friedrich Leopold (1865–1931)
- Frederick Louis, Prince of Hohenlohe-Ingelfingen (1746–1818)
- Prince Friedrich Sigismund of Prussia (1891–1927), son of Prince Friedrich Leopold
- Friedrich Wilhelm (1924–2010), son of Prince Frederick
- Prince Friedrich Wilhelm of Lippe (born 1947), son of Prince Ernst August
- Prince Friedrich Wilhelm of Prussia (1880–1925), son of Prince Albert (1837–1906)
- Prince Frederick William of Hesse-Kassel (1820–1884), son of Prince Frederick (1747–1837)
- Prince Frederick William of Schleswig-Holstein-Sonderburg-Augustenburg (1668–1714), son of Duke Ernest Günther
- Prince Frederick William of Solms-Braunfels (1770–1814), son of Prince Ferdinand

== Other uses ==
- Prince Frederick Harbour, in York Sound, Western Australia
- Prince Frederick, Maryland, a town in the United States
- Prince Frederick Sound in southern Alaska
- HMS Prince Frederick, several ships of the Royal Navy

== See also ==
- Prince Frederick's Barge, the state barge of Frederick, Prince of Wales
- SS Prinz Friedrich Wilhelm, a North German Lloyd liner
- ;;Printz Friederich;;, a Danish ship-of-the-Line which sank in 1780
- Emperor Frederick (disambiguation)
- King Frederick (disambiguation)
