= Frederick, Crown Prince of Denmark =

Frederick, Crown Prince of Denmark, or Frederik, Crown Prince of Denmark, may refer to:

- Frederick IV of Denmark (1671–1730; r. 1699–1730), Crown Prince from 1671 to 1699 as the eldest son of Christian V
- Frederick V of Denmark (1723–1766; r. 1746–1766), Crown Prince from 1730 to 1746 as the only son of Christian VI
- Frederick VI of Denmark (1768–1839; r. 1808–1839), Crown Prince from 1768 to 1808 as the eldest son of Christian VII
- Frederik VII (1808–1863; r. 1848–1863), Crown Prince from 1839 to 1848 as the eldest surviving son of Christian VIII
- Frederick VIII of Denmark (1843–1912; r. 1906–1912), Crown Prince from 1863 to 1906 as the eldest son of Christian IX
- Frederik IX (1899–1972; r. 1947–1972), Crown Prince from 1912 to 1947 as the eldest son of Christian X
- Frederik X (born 1968; r. 2024–present), Crown Prince from 1972 to 2024 as the eldest son of Margrethe II

== See also ==
- Frederick, Hereditary Prince of Denmark (1753–1805), heir of Christian VII from 1766 to 1768
- Frederick of Denmark (disambiguation)
- Prince Frederick (disambiguation)
