= House Order of the Golden Lion =

Order of chivalry in Germany

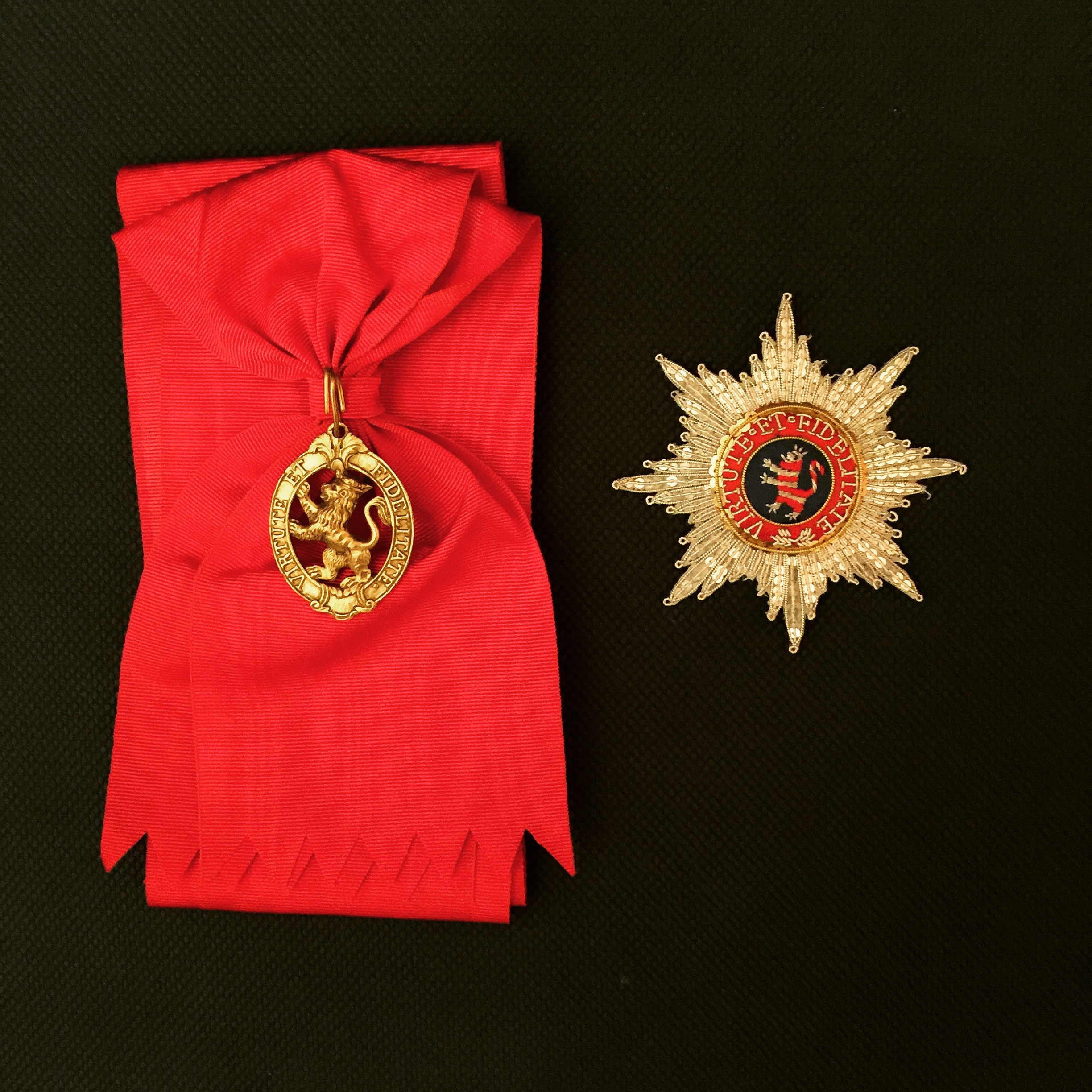
- Sash, badge and breast star of the House Order of the Golden Lion
- Type: State Order (formerly); Dynastic Order (currently)
- Established: 14 August 1770 (Hesse-Kassel); October 1875 (Hesse and by Rhine)
- Royal house: House of Hesse
- Motto: Virtute et Fidelitate
- Awarded for: Civil and military merit
- Grand Master: Donatus, Landgrave of Hesse
- Grades: Knight
- Former grades: Grand Cross; Commander 1st Class; Commander 2nd Class

Precedence
- Next (higher): Ludwig Order (after 1875)
- Next (lower): Military Merit Order (Hesse-Kassel, until 1851); Wilhelmsorden (Hesse-Kassel, until 1875); Order of Philip the Magnanimous (Hesse and by Rhine)
- Ribbon bar of the order

The House Order of the Golden Lion (German: Hausorden vom Goldenen Löwen) was an order of the German Landgraviate and Electorate of Hesse-Kassel and later, the Grand Duchy of Hesse and by Rhine. It was first instituted in 1770 by Landgrave Frederick II, in honour of and under the patronage of Saint Elizabeth of Hungary, an ancestor of the House of Hesse, and was intended to award auspicious merit.

== Overview ==
Initially conferred in one class (Knight), the order was revised in 1815 by Landgrave William IX (later William I, Elector of Hesse), who added the grades of Grand Cross and Commander. It was further expanded in 1818 with William splitting the Commander grade into two separate classes; thus, the order had the grades of Grand Cross, Commander 1st Class, Commander 2nd Class and Knight. It reverted to a single-class order on 20 August 1851 when Elector Frederick William I founded the Wilhelmsorden, which was created from the latter three classes. Membership of the Order of the Golden Lion was then restricted to 41 knights, including the princes of the electoral family (who were inducted into the order from birth).

In the wake of the Austro-Prussian War in 1866, Hesse-Kassel – who had sided with Austria – was annexed into Prussia, with the Order of the Golden Lion and all electoral orders of chivalry incorporated into the Prussian honours system. With the death of Frederick William I with no legitimate heirs, the main line of the Electoral House of Hesse-Kassel became extinct, and the orders were subsequently abolished on 27 August 1875. The order was later resurrected as the "Grand Ducal Hessian Order of the Golden Lion" by Louis III, Grand Duke of Hesse in October 1875, as a single-class order below that of the Ludwig Order. It was thereafter awarded to members of the Grand Ducal House and foreign royalty, as well as the high nobility.

The Order of the Golden Lion ceased to be a state order in 1918 with all grand ducal orders, following the defeat of Germany in World War I and the abdication of the last Grand Duke. It currently survives as a dynastic order of the House of Hesse.

== Insignia ==
- The badge consists of a crowned golden lion within a golden oval hoop on the obverse with the motto: "Virtute et Fidelitate", and on the lapel with the inscription:
  - I. Model: "Fridericus II D. G. Hassiae Landgravius inst. 1770."
  - II. Model: "Wilhelmus I Hassiae Elector 1803".
- The ribbon is crimson in the widths for the sash, neck cross (commander) and pectoral cross (knight).
- The collar, which was worn on special occasions, consisted of golden lions alternating with medallions with the inscription "FL".

The knights wore this medal on a crimson ribbon, hanging from the right shoulder to the left hip, and also on the left breast an eight-pointed silver star embroidered with rays, in the center of which on a blue handle with the red background and silver embroidered motto.

== Recipients ==
=== Electoral order ===
- Prince Adalbert of Bavaria (1828–1875)
- Prince Adalbert of Prussia (1811–1873)
- Adolphe, Grand Duke of Luxembourg
- Prince Adolphus, Duke of Cambridge
- Prince Albert of Prussia (1809–1872)
- Prince Albert of Prussia (1837–1906)
- Albert of Saxony
- Prince Alexander of Hesse and by Rhine
- Alexander II of Russia
- Arthur Wellesley, 1st Duke of Wellington
- Burkhard Wilhelm Pfeiffer
- Prince Charles of Prussia
- Christian IX of Denmark
- Prince Christian of Hesse-Philippsthal-Barchfeld
- Prince Emil of Hesse
- Ernest Augustus, Crown Prince of Hanover
- Ernest Augustus, King of Hanover
- Ferdinand I of Austria
- Franz Joseph I of Austria
- Friedrich, Duke of Schleswig-Holstein-Sonderburg-Glücksburg
- Frederick III, German Emperor
- Frederick VII of Denmark
- Frederick Francis II, Grand Duke of Mecklenburg-Schwerin
- Prince Frederick William of Hesse-Kassel
- Frederick William, Elector of Hesse
- Frederick William, Grand Duke of Mecklenburg-Strelitz
- Frederick William IV of Prussia
- Duke Georg August of Mecklenburg-Strelitz
- Prince Frederick of the Netherlands
- Prince Frederick of Prussia (1794–1863)
- Prince Friedrich Karl of Prussia (1828–1885)
- Prince George, Duke of Cambridge
- Georg II, Duke of Saxe-Meiningen
- Prince George of Prussia
- George, King of Saxony
- Prince Heinrich of Hesse and by Rhine
- Prince Henry of the Netherlands (1820–1879)
- Baron Karl Ludwig von der Pfordten
- Konstantin of Hohenlohe-Schillingsfürst
- Leopold I of Belgium
- Leopold II of Belgium
- Louis III, Grand Duke of Hesse
- Louis IV, Grand Duke of Hesse
- Ludwig Wilhelm, Prince of Bentheim and Steinfurt
- Luitpold, Prince Regent of Bavaria
- Maximilian II of Bavaria
- Napoleon III
- Nicholas I of Russia
- Otto von Bismarck
- Archduke Stephen of Austria (Palatine of Hungary)
- Prince Waldemar of Prussia (1817–1849)
- Prince Wilhelm of Prussia (1783–1851)
- William, Duke of Brunswick
- Prince William of Hesse-Philippsthal-Barchfeld
- William I, German Emperor
- William II, Elector of Hesse
- William III of the Netherlands

=== Grand ducal order ===
- Adolphus Cambridge, 1st Marquess of Cambridge
- Adolphus Frederick V, Grand Duke of Mecklenburg-Strelitz
- Alexander Frederick, Landgrave of Hesse
- Alexandra of Denmark
- Alexandra Feodorovna (Alix of Hesse)
- Princess Alexandra of Saxe-Coburg and Gotha
- Alfred, Duke of Saxe-Coburg and Gotha
- Princess Alice of Battenberg
- Prince Andrew of Greece and Denmark
- Princess Anna of Montenegro
- Princess Anna of Prussia
- Princess Augusta of Cambridge
- Princess Beatrice of the United Kingdom
- Bruno, Prince of Ysenburg and Büdingen
- Chlodwig, Landgrave of Hesse-Philippsthal-Barchfeld
- Edward VII
- Edward VIII
- Princess Eleonore of Solms-Hohensolms-Lich
- Princess Elisabeth of Hesse-Kassel
- Princess Elisabeth of Hesse and by Rhine (1864–1918)
- Ernest Louis, Grand Duke of Hesse
- Ernest, Landgrave of Hesse-Philippsthal
- Prince Frederick Charles of Hesse
- Frederick William III, Landgrave of Hesse
- George V
- Prince Henry of Prussia (1862–1929)
- Princess Irene of Hesse and by Rhine
- Julia, Princess of Battenberg
- Prince Louis of Battenberg
- Louise of Hesse-Kassel
- Grand Duchess Maria Alexandrovna of Russia
- Princess Marie of Battenberg
- Princess Marie Luise Charlotte of Hesse-Kassel
- Marie of Romania
- Princess Margaret of Prussia
- Mary of Teck
- Nicholas II of Russia
- Archduke Rainer Ferdinand of Austria
- Grand Duke Sergei Alexandrovich of Russia
- Otto Graf zu Stolberg-Wernigerode
- Umberto II of Italy
- Princess Victoria of Hesse and by Rhine
- Princess Victoria Melita of Saxe-Coburg and Gotha
- Victoria, Princess Royal
- Queen Victoria
- Wilhelm II, German Emperor

== Literature ==
- Maximilian Gritzner, "Handbuch der Ritter- und Verdienstorden". Leipzig. 1893.
