= Princess Anna of Prussia =

Prussian princess (1836–1918)

Anna of Prussia
- Landgravine of Hesse
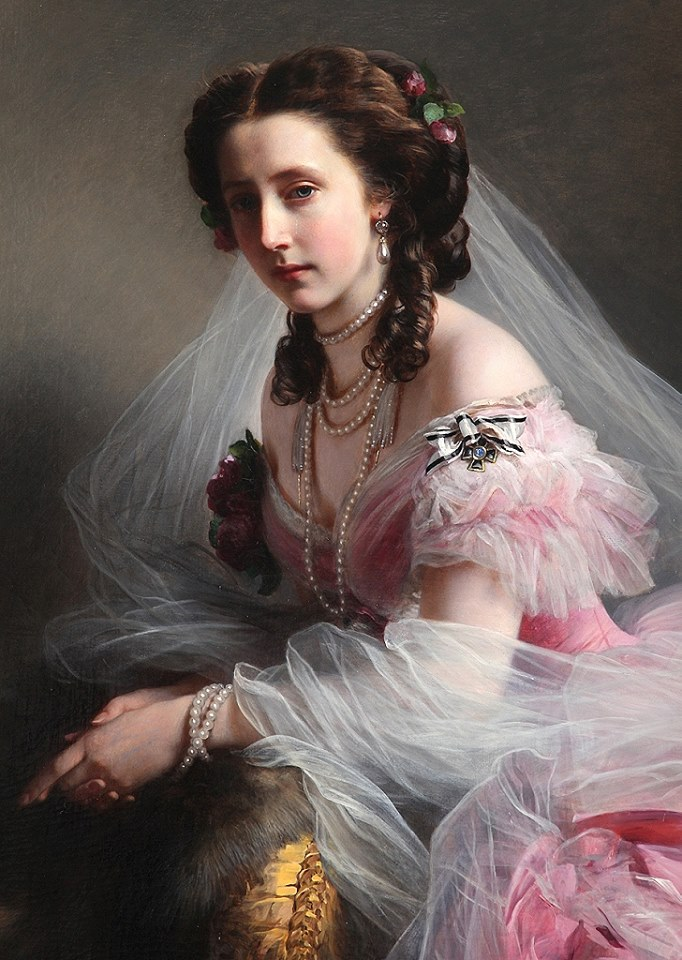
- Portrait by Franz Xaver Winterhalter, 1858
- Born: 17 May 1836; Berlin
- Died: 12 June 1918 (aged 82); Frankfurt
- Spouse: Frederick William II, Landgrave of Hesse (m. 1853; died 1884)
- Issue: Frederick William III, Landgrave of Hesse; Elisabeth, Hereditary Princess of Anhalt; Alexander Frederick, Landgrave of Hesse; Frederick Charles, Landgrave of Hesse; Marie-Polyxene; Sybille Marguerite
Names
- German: Maria Anna Friederike
- House: Hohenzollern
- Father: Prince Charles of Prussia
- Mother: Princess Marie of Saxe-Weimar-Eisenach

Anna of Prussia (German: Maria Anna Friederike von Preußen; 17 May 1836 – 12 June 1918) was a Prussian princess as the granddaughter of King Frederick William III of Prussia. She was the second wife of Prince Frederick William of Hesse-Kassel.

== Early life ==
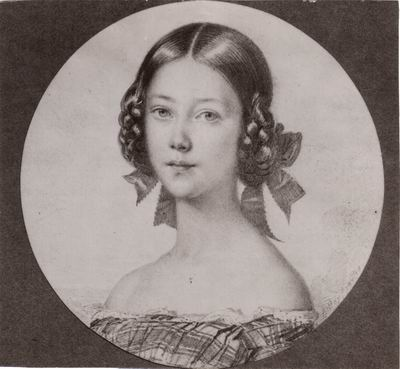
A young Anna

Anna was the youngest of the three children of Prince Charles of Prussia and Princess Marie of Saxe-Weimar-Eisenach.

As a beautiful young princess, she was the object of much attention at court. In the winter of 1852, the young Emperor Franz Joseph I of Austria met her in Berlin, fell in love, and wished to propose to her. His mother, Archduchess Sophie of Austria, wrote to her sister Queen Elisabeth of Prussia referring to "the happiness that showed itself to him like a fleeting dream and made an impression on his heart -- alas -- much stronger and deeper than I had first thought." However, Anna was already engaged at that time, and as an added complication, there were strong feelings against an alliance with Austria among Prussian statesmen. Franz Joseph's mother asked, "whether there is any hope that this sad marriage, which they are imposing on this charming Anna and which leaves her no prospect of happiness whatsoever, could be prevented," but to no avail. Sophie predicted that Anna's marriage to her betrothed, Frederick William of Hesse-Kassel, would be unhappy, which turned out to be correct.

== Marriage and issue ==
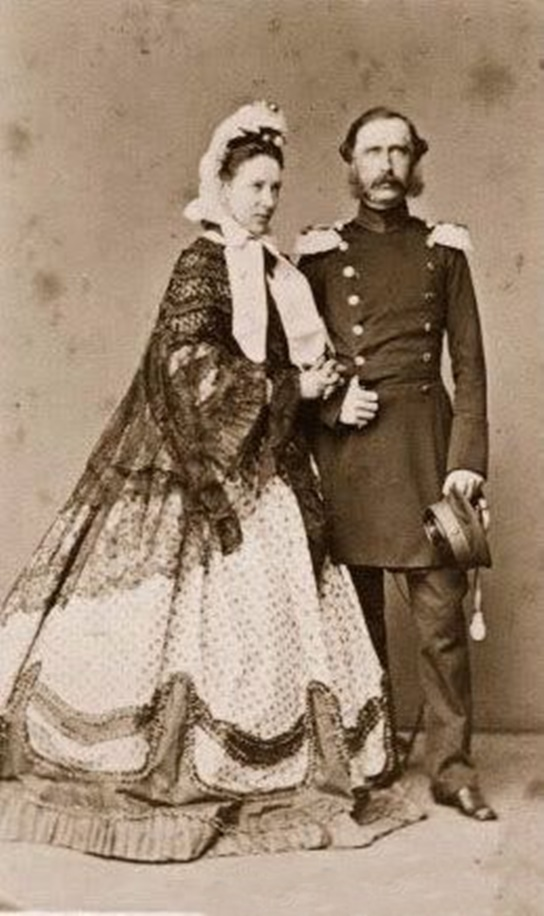
Princess Anna with her husband, Prince Frederick William

On 26 May 1853, Anna married her second cousin Prince Frederick William of Hesse-Kassel at Charlottenburg Palace in Berlin. Anna was the second wife of her new husband, who nine years previously had experienced the traumatic death in childbirth of his beloved first wife, Grand Duchess Alexandra Nikolaevna of Russia. He never got over this loss, which took place less than a year after his wedding to Alexandra. Like Sophie correctly predicted, Frederick's relationship with Anna was polite, but emotionally distant. They did, however, have six children, being:

- Prince Frederick William III of Hesse (15 October 1854 – 14 October 1888); never married; died at sea on a voyage from Batavia to Singapore.
- Princess Elisabeth Alexandra Charlotte of Hesse (13 June 1861 – 7 June 1955); married Leopold, Hereditary Prince of Anhalt and had issue.
- Prince Alexander Frederick of Hesse (25 January 1863 – 26 March 1945); married Baroness Gisela Stockhorner von Starheim, daughter of Otto, Baron Stockhorner von Starheim and Baroness Emilie Susanne Hildegard von Wolzogen zu Neuhaus; had issue.
- Prince Frederick Charles of Hesse, King of Finland (1 May 1868 – 28 May 1940); married Princess Margaret of Prussia and had issue.
- Princess Marie-Polyxene of Hesse (29 April 1872 – 16 August 1882); died at age 10 of osteomyelitis.
- Princess Sybille Marguerite of Hesse (3 June 1877 – 11 February 1952); married Friedrich Alexander Henry Robert Carl Albert, Baron von Vincke (divorced 1923).

== Assessments ==
Queen Victoria's daughter, Victoria, Princess Royal, who was married to Anna's cousin, the future Emperor of Germany, wrote about Anna:

...[she] is very pretty, the most splendid figure you ever saw, but I do not like her style quite, her gowns are a good deal fuller than the Empress' and so low, I cannot bear that; and I do not like to see the Princesses dancing about with everybody ...

However, Anna also had a reputation for intelligence, and presided over a court salon of artists and musicians, which included Johannes Brahms, Clara Schumann, Anton Rubinstein, and Julius Stockhausen. She herself was a classically trained pianist who studied under Theodor Kullak. Brahms dedicated his Piano Quintet to her in 1865.

Unusually for a Hessian landgravine, she converted to Catholicism in 1901, which led to political complications. Anna was the subject of one of the most famous paintings by Franz Xaver Winterhalter, in which she is depicted wearing a sweeping dress of tulle over pink silk.

== Widow and convert to Roman Catholicism ==
Princess Anna suffered numerous strokes of fate one after the other, which caused her to turn more to religious things. In 1882 her 10-year-old daughter Marie Polyxene died of osteomyelitis, in 1884 her husband died of a serious stomach disease, in 1886 she lost her young son-in-law, Hereditary Prince Leopold of Anhalt; her eldest son Friedrich Wilhelm died on a sea voyage in 1888.

She had already met Bishop Wilhelm Emmanuel von Ketteler during a stay in Mainz in 1866, who made a strong impression on her and sparked a lasting interest in the Roman Catholic Church in her. She often stayed at Fasanerie palace in Eichenzell, near Fulda, in a Roman Catholic region. Over the years, the princess developed an ever-growing affinity for the Roman Catholic faith and finally, after thorough instruction from Professor Viktor Thielemann (1867–1944), officially declared her conversion to the Roman Catholic Church on October 10, 1901. In addition to the local Bishop Adalbert Endert and his successor Joseph Damian Schmitt, the later Bishop of Meissen Christian Schreiber and Archduchess Maria Luise of Austria her husband, Prince Charles II, he himself a convert, also attended the ceremony in the chapel of the Fulda seminary.

As early as August 7, 1901, a personal police officer brought her the hand letter of Kaiser Wilhelm II, in which he, as head of the House of Hohenzollern, expelled her from the family because of her impending change of faith. However, in 1918, shortly before Princess Anna's death, he visited her personally again, regretted his actions and reconciled with her.

In April 1902 the Princess went to Rome, where she met Pope Leo XIII and was received in private audience. On this occasion she also met the then Undersecretary of State Giacomo della Chiesa, the future Benedict XV.

In 1905 Princesa Anna was accepted as a member of the Third Order of the Franciscans, in whose sister's habit she was later buried at her request. Since 1902, she maintained friendly contacts with the newly founded St. Bonifatius monastery in Hünfeld, to which she made several valuable donations: a green vestment of 20 parts, the portrait painting of the founder of the order Eugen von Mazenod made by Paul Beckert and after her death a silver altar cross with four candlesticks with a cross relic. The Congregation of the Oblate Missionaries made her an honorary oblate and young priests often served as chaplains in the castle chapel at Adophseck Castle every day during the summer months where Masses were celebrated.

== Death and burial ==
Anna spent her final years in Frankfurt, where she died on June 12, 1918, at the age of 82. Pope Benedict XV had given his personal blessing and had his greetings delivered. At her death, Anna of Prussia was the eldest member of the Princely House of Hohenzollern. On June 17, she was laid out in St. Anthony's Church, which she had donated and was her daily residence for prayer and mass. The Limburg bishop Augustinus Kilian held the pontifical requiem there in the presence of Queen Wilhelmina of the Netherlands and many members of royal families. The coffin was then transported to Fulda by train where the princess was buried at her own request in Fulda Cathedral, in front of the St. Anne Altar, near the grave of St. Boniface. The Ecclesiastical Latin inscription reads:

Hic iacet Serenissima Landgrafia Hassiae ANNA Principissa Borussiae nata Berolini die 17. maii 1836 obiit Francofurti die 12. junii 1918 + Misericordias Domini in aeternum cantabo R.I.P.

Translation:

Here lies Her Serene Highness Anna Landgravine of Hesse, Princess of Prussia, in Berlin born on the 17th day of May 1836, in Frankfurt died on the 12th day of June 1918. "Eternal mercies of Our Lord I shall sing…" Rest in Peace.

== Honours ==
- Kingdom of Prussia: Dame of the Order of Louise, 1st Division
- Grand Duchy of Hesse: Dame of the Order of the Golden Lion, 1 January 1883
- Spain: 795th Dame of the Order of Queen Maria Luisa -

== Ancestry ==
Ancestors of Princess Anna of Prussia

8. Frederick William II of Prussia
4. Frederick William III of Prussia
9. Princess Friederike Luise of Hesse-Darmstadt
2. Prince Charles of Prussia
10. Charles II, Grand Duke of Mecklenburg-Strelitz
5. Duchess Louise of Mecklenburg-Strelitz
11. Princess Friederike of Hesse-Darmstadt
1. Princess Anna of Prussia
12. Charles Augustus, Grand Duke of Saxe-Weimar-Eisenach
6. Charles Frederick, Grand Duke of Saxe-Weimar-Eisenach
13. Princess Louise of Hesse-Darmstadt
3. Princess Marie of Saxe-Weimar-Eisenach
14. Paul I of Russia
7. Grand Duchess Maria Pavlovna of Russia
15. Duchess Sophie Dorothea of Württemburg

== Literature ==
- Landgravine Anna of Hesse 1836-1918. Stations in the life of a Hessian princess. Catalog for the exhibition. Museum Schloss Fasanerie June 16 – October 14, 2018. Imhof, Petersberg 2018. ISBN 978-3-7319-0750-3 and ISBN 978-3-9816021-5-9.
- Katharina Bechler: Notes on the room decoration of Philippsruhe Palace from the modernization phase 1875–1880, pp. 198–219.
- Christoph Heinemann: Anna of Hesse and the Hünfelder Bonifatiuskloster. A look into the monastery chronicle, pp. 142–153.
- Christine Klössel: Third Phase of Life, Conversion and Death, pp. 126–137.
- Christine Klössel: Family life - mother's happiness and mother's suffering, pp. 66-85.
- Christine Klössel: Childhood, Love and Marriage, pp. 8–19.
- Christine Klössel: Landgrave couple without land, pp. 48–59.
- Christine Klössel: Elixir of Life Music, pp. 110–121.
- Kapistran Romeis: Princess Anna of Prussia, Landgravine of Hesse - Her way to the Catholic Church. Herder, Freiburg, 1925.
- John Röhl: Emperor, court and state - Wilhelm II and German politics. Beck, Munich 2002, ISBN 978-3-406-49405-5, p. 106.
