= Princess Elisabeth of Hesse-Kassel =

Princess Elisabeth
- Hereditary Princess of Anhalt
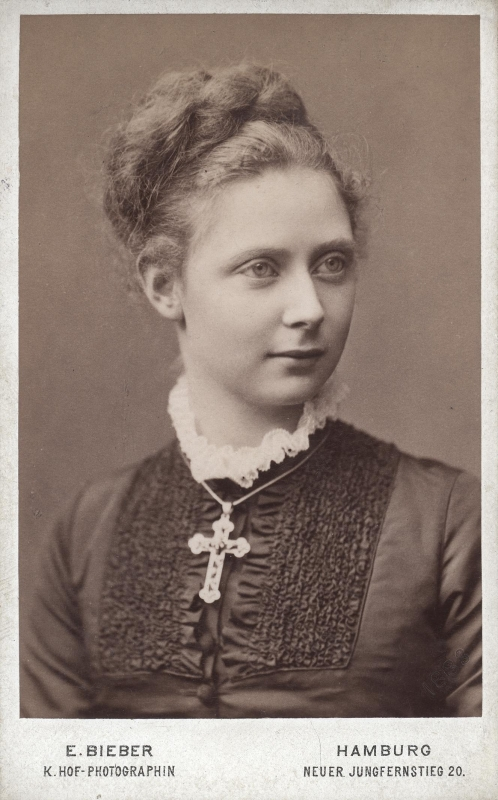
- Elisabeth in 1883
- Born: 13 June 1861; Copenhagen, Denmark
- Died: 7 June 1955 (aged 93); Dessau, East Germany
- Spouse: Leopold, Hereditary Prince of Anhalt (m. 1884; died 1886)
- Issue: Antoinette, Princess Frederick of Schaumburg-Lippe
- Father: Frederick William II, Landgrave of Hesse
- Mother: Princess Anna of Prussia

Princess Elizabeth Charlotte Alexandra Mary Louise of Hesse-Kassel (German: Elisabeth Charlotte Alexandra Marie Luise von Hessen-Kassel; 13 June 1861 – 7 June 1955), was a Princess of Hesse-Kassel by birth and, by her marriage to Leopold, Hereditary Prince of Anhalt, the Hereditary Princess of Anhalt.

== Early life ==
Elisabeth was born in Copenhagen, the daughter of Prince Frederick William of Hesse-Kassel and Princess Anna of Prussia, a granddaughter of Frederick William III, King of Prussia. She was the couple's second child and eldest daughter.

== Biography ==
Elisabeth was considered as a possible bride of Leopold, Duke of Albany, the fourth son of Queen Victoria. It was said that Leopold was eager to meet Elisabeth based on news of her good reputation. While the two met in November 1879, no marriage plans materialized.

Elisabeth became engaged in December 1883 to Leopold, Hereditary Prince of Anhalt. Leopold was the heir to the Duchy of Anhalt-Dessau and the son of Frederick I, Duke of Anhalt, and Princess Antoinette of Saxe-Altenburg. On 26 May 1884, the couple married in a lavish ceremony at Philippsruhe Castle in Hanau. A commemorative medal was issued for the occasion, as was common with royal marriages in the Duchy of Anhalt.

Leopold and Elisabeth had one child:

- Princess Antoinette of Anhalt (Schloss Georgium, 3 March 1885 – Dessau, 3 April 1963), married on 26 May 1909 to Prince Frederick of Schaumburg-Lippe.

Leopold died suddenly in Cannes, France, on 2 February 1886. (Coincidentally, Elisabeth's former suitor Leopold of Albany had also died suddenly in Cannes in 1884.) Antoinette was not eligible to succeed her father as the Hereditary Princess of Anhalt due to the Salic Law, so Leopold's claim was inherited by his younger brother, the future Frederick II, Duke of Anhalt. Elisabeth never remarried and survived her husband by nearly 70 years. She died in Dessau 7 June 1955, at age 93. She is buried in Dessau.

== Ancestry ==
Ancestors of Princess Elisabeth of Hesse-Kassel

8. Prince Frederick of Hesse-Kassel
4. Prince William of Hesse-Kassel
9. Princess Caroline of Nassau-Usingen
2. Prince Frederick William of Hesse-Kassel
10. Frederick, Hereditary Prince of Denmark and Norway
5. Princess Louise Charlotte of Denmark
11. Duchess Sophia Frederica of Mecklenburg-Schwerin
1. Princess Elisabeth of Hesse-Kassel
12. Frederick William III of Prussia
6. Prince Charles of Prussia
13. Louise of Mecklenburg-Strelitz
3. Princess Anna of Prussia
14. Charles Frederick, Grand Duke of Saxe-Weimar-Eisenach
7. Princess Marie of Saxe-Weimar-Eisenach
15. Grand Duchess Maria Pavlovna of Russia
