= Ludwig Order =

Order of the Grand Duchy of Hesse

Ludwig Order Ludwigsorden
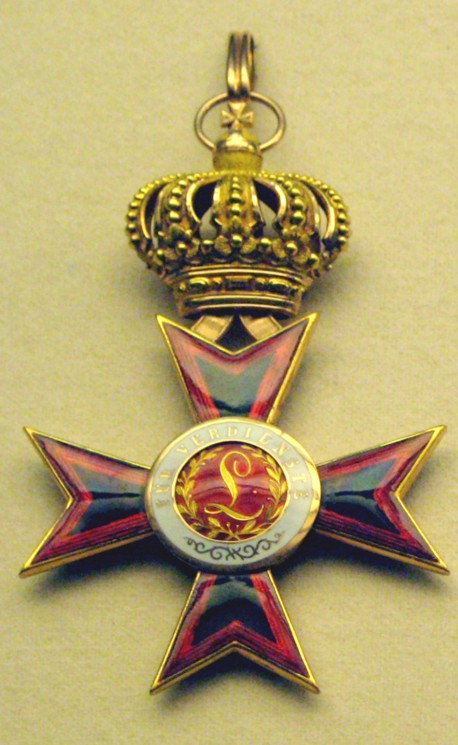
- The badge of the Grand Cross

Awarded by The Grand Duke of Hesse
- Type: Order
- Motto: Gott Ehre Vater Land
- Eligibility: soldiers and civilians
- Awarded for: merit
- Status: defunct
- Sovereign: Grand Duke of Hesse
- Grades: Grand Cross; Commander 1st Class; Commander 2nd Class; Knight 1st Class; Knight 2nd Class

Statistics
- Last induction: 1918

Precedence
- Next (higher): None
- Next (lower): Order of Philip the Magnanimous (before 1875); Order of the Golden Lion (after 1875)
- Ribbon bar of the order

The Ludwig Order (German: Großherzoglich Hessischer Ludwigsorden), was an order of the Grand Duchy of Hesse which was awarded to meritorious soldiers and civilians from 1807 to 1918.

== History ==
The order was founded by Ludwig I, Grand Duke of Hesse and by Rhine as an order of merit without name or statute on 25 August 1807. On 14 December 1831, under the auspices of Ludwig II, Grand Duke of Hesse and by Rhine, statutes were adopted for the order, giving it its formal name, that of the Ludwig Order, dividing it into five classes, and setting the terms for award. The statutes were supplemented on 9 March 1854 and again on 30 March 1912, when the grade of Knight's Cross 1st class was replaced with a pinback breast decoration dubbed the Honour Cross. Whilst the grade of Knight's Cross 2nd class was simplified to just Knight's Cross.

The order became obsolete with the abdication of the last Grand Duke of Hesse in November 1918.

== Classes ==
The order was divided into five classes:

- Grand Cross, worn on a sash with an eight-pointed silver star.
- Commander 1st Class, worn on a necklet with a four pointed star
- Commander 2nd Class, worn on a necklet without a breast star
- Knight 1st Class, at first worn on the left breast suspended from a ribbon, later replaced by a pinback version similar to the Iron Cross 1st Class
- Knight 2nd Class, worn suspended from a ribbon on the left breast

Recipients

=== Grand Crosses ===
- Abbas II of Egypt
- Prince Adalbert of Bavaria (1828–1875)
- Prince Adalbert of Prussia (1811–1873)
- Prince Adalbert of Prussia (1884–1948)
- Vladimir Fyodorovich Adlerberg
- Adolphe, Grand Duke of Luxembourg
- Adolphus Frederick V, Grand Duke of Mecklenburg-Strelitz
- Prince Albert of Prussia (1809–1872)
- Albert of Saxony
- Albert, Duke of Schleswig-Holstein
- Archduke Albrecht, Duke of Teschen
- Prince Albert of Prussia (1837–1906)
- Prince Albert Victor, Duke of Clarence and Avondale
- Albrecht, Duke of Württemberg
- Alexander II of Russia
- Alexander III of Russia
- Alexander of Battenberg
- Prince Alexander of Hesse and by Rhine
- Duke Alexander of Oldenburg
- Prince Alexander of Prussia
- Alexander Frederick, Landgrave of Hesse
- Grand Duke Alexei Alexandrovich of Russia
- Prince Alfons of Bavaria
- Alfonso XIII
- Alfred, Duke of Saxe-Coburg and Gotha
- Alfred, Hereditary Prince of Saxe-Coburg and Gotha
- Grand Duke Andrei Vladimirovich of Russia
- Prince Arnulf of Bavaria
- Friedrich von Beck-Rzikowsky
- Prince Arthur of Connaught
- Prince Arthur, Duke of Connaught and Strathearn
- Prince August Wilhelm of Prussia
- Bernhard II, Duke of Saxe-Meiningen
- Bernhard III, Duke of Saxe-Meiningen
- Prince Bernhard of Saxe-Weimar-Eisenach (1792–1862)
- Theobald von Bethmann Hollweg
- Otto von Bismarck
- Jérôme Bonaparte
- Walther Bronsart von Schellendorff
- Bruno, Prince of Ysenburg and Büdingen
- Bernhard von Bülow
- Saturnino Calderón Collantes
- Carl, 3rd Prince of Leiningen
- Carlos I of Portugal
- Carol I of Romania
- Charles I of Württemberg
- Charles II, Duke of Brunswick
- Charles III, Prince of Monaco
- Charles Alexander, Grand Duke of Saxe-Weimar-Eisenach
- Charles Augustus, Hereditary Grand Duke of Saxe-Weimar-Eisenach (1844–1894)
- Prince Charles of Hesse and by Rhine
- Prince Charles of Prussia
- Charles of Solms-Hohensolms-Lich
- Chlodwig, Landgrave of Hesse-Philippsthal-Barchfeld
- Christian IX of Denmark
- Prince Christian of Schleswig-Holstein
- Prince Christian Victor of Schleswig-Holstein
- Chulalongkorn
- Constantine I of Greece
- Grand Duke Dmitry Konstantinovich of Russia
- Edward VII
- Prince Edward of Saxe-Weimar
- Prince Eitel Friedrich of Prussia
- Princess Eleonore of Solms-Hohensolms-Lich
- Duke Elimar of Oldenburg
- Prince Emil of Hesse
- Ernest Augustus, King of Hanover
- Ernest Louis, Grand Duke of Hesse
- Ernst Günther II, Duke of Schleswig-Holstein
- Ernst Leopold, 4th Prince of Leiningen
- Archduke Eugen of Austria
- Prince Ferdinand of Bavaria
- Ferdinand I of Austria
- Ferdinand I of Bulgaria
- Ferdinand I of Romania
- Ferdinand, Landgrave of Hesse-Homburg
- Prince Francis Joseph of Battenberg
- Francis V, Duke of Modena
- Francisco de Asís, Duke of Cádiz
- Franz Joseph I of Austria
- Archduke Franz Karl of Austria
- Frederick II, Grand Duke of Baden
- Frederick VIII of Denmark
- Frederick Augustus II, Grand Duke of Oldenburg
- Frederick Augustus III of Saxony
- Frederick Francis II, Grand Duke of Mecklenburg-Schwerin
- Frederick Francis III, Grand Duke of Mecklenburg-Schwerin
- Frederick Francis IV, Grand Duke of Mecklenburg-Schwerin
- Frederick I, Duke of Anhalt
- Frederick I, Grand Duke of Baden
- Frederick III, German Emperor
- Prince Frederick of Prussia (1794–1863)
- Prince Frederick Charles of Hesse
- Frederick William III, Landgrave of Hesse
- Frederick William III of Prussia
- Frederick William IV of Prussia
- Frederick William, Elector of Hesse
- Frederick William, Grand Duke of Mecklenburg-Strelitz
- Archduke Friedrich of Austria (1821–1847)
- Prince Friedrich Karl of Prussia (1828–1885)
- Prince Friedrich Leopold of Prussia
- Duke Georg August of Mecklenburg-Strelitz
- Georg Donatus, Hereditary Grand Duke of Hesse
- George I of Greece
- George V
- George Albert, Prince of Schwarzburg-Rudolstadt
- Prince George of Greece and Denmark
- Prince George of Prussia
- George, King of Saxony
- Grand Duke George Alexandrovich of Russia
- Grand Duke George Mikhailovich of Russia (1863–1919)
- George Victor, Prince of Waldeck and Pyrmont
- Alexander Gorchakov
- Gustaf V
- Gustav, Prince of Vasa
- Gustav, Landgrave of Hesse-Homburg
- Wilhelm von Hahnke
- Prince Henry of Battenberg
- Prince Henry of Prussia (1862–1929)
- Prince Heinrich of Hesse and by Rhine
- Heinrich VII, Prince Reuss of Köstritz
- Prince Hermann of Saxe-Weimar-Eisenach (1825–1901)
- Hermann, Prince of Solms-Hohensolms-Lich
- Karl Eberhard Herwarth von Bittenfeld
- Oskar von Hutier
- Prince Joachim of Prussia
- Prince Johann Georg of Saxony
- Archduke John of Austria
- John of Saxony
- Duke John Albert of Mecklenburg
- Archduke Joseph Karl of Austria
- Karl Anton, Prince of Hohenzollern
- Archduke Karl Ludwig of Austria
- Prince Karl Theodor of Bavaria
- Karl Theodor, Duke in Bavaria
- Karl II, Prince of Isenburg-Birstein
- Grand Duke Kirill Vladimirovich of Russia
- Hans von Koester
- Grand Duke Konstantin Konstantinovich of Russia
- Grand Duke Konstantin Nikolayevich of Russia
- Konstantin of Hohenlohe-Schillingsfürst
- Leopold I of Belgium
- Leopold II of Belgium
- Prince Leopold, Duke of Albany
- Prince Leopold of Bavaria
- Leopold, Prince of Hohenzollern
- Eugen Maximilianovich, 5th Duke of Leuchtenberg
- Walter von Loë
- Louis III, Grand Duke of Hesse
- Louis IV, Grand Duke of Hesse
- Louis II, Grand Duke of Baden
- Prince Louis of Battenberg
- Ludwig I of Bavaria
- Ludwig II of Bavaria
- Ludwig III of Bavaria
- Prince Ludwig Ferdinand of Bavaria
- Archduke Ludwig Viktor of Austria
- Duke Ludwig Wilhelm in Bavaria (1831–1920)
- Luís I of Portugal
- Luitpold, Prince Regent of Bavaria
- Prince Maximilian of Baden
- Maximilian I of Mexico
- Maximilian II of Bavaria
- Maximilian Egon II, Prince of Fürstenberg
- Duke Maximilian Joseph in Bavaria
- Duke Charles of Mecklenburg
- Klemens von Metternich
- Grand Duke Michael Nikolaevich of Russia
- Grand Duke Michael Alexandrovich of Russia
- Milan I of Serbia
- Helmuth von Moltke the Elder
- Napoleon III
- Nicholas I of Montenegro
- Nicholas I of Russia
- Nicholas II of Russia
- Prince Nicholas of Greece and Denmark
- Nicholas Alexandrovich, Tsesarevich of Russia
- Grand Duke Nicholas Konstantinovich of Russia
- Grand Duke Nicholas Mikhailovich of Russia
- Grand Duke Nicholas Nikolaevich of Russia (1831–1891)
- Grand Duke Nicholas Nikolaevich of Russia (1856–1929)
- Prince Nikolaus Wilhelm of Nassau
- Oscar II
- Prince Oskar of Prussia
- Archduke Otto of Austria (1865–1906)
- Otto of Bavaria
- Otto of Greece
- Duke Paul Frederick of Mecklenburg
- Peter II, Grand Duke of Oldenburg
- Duke Peter of Oldenburg
- Grand Duke Peter Nikolaevich of Russia
- Prince Philipp of Saxe-Coburg and Gotha
- Hans von Plessen
- Prince Frederick William of Hesse-Kassel
- Joseph Radetzky von Radetz
- Archduke Rainer Ferdinand of Austria
- Robert I, Duke of Parma
- Prince Rudolf of Liechtenstein
- Rudolf, Crown Prince of Austria
- Rupprecht, Crown Prince of Bavaria
- Princess Mafalda of Savoy
- Alfred von Schlieffen
- Infante Sebastian of Portugal and Spain
- Grand Duke Sergei Alexandrovich of Russia
- Archduke Stephen of Austria (Palatine of Hungary)
- Ludwig Freiherr von und zu der Tann-Rathsamhausen
- Francis, Duke of Teck
- Julius von Verdy du Vernois
- Princess Victoria Melita of Saxe-Coburg and Gotha
- Grand Duke Vladimir Alexandrovich of Russia
- Illarion Vorontsov-Dashkov
- Prince Waldemar of Prussia (1889–1945)
- Alfred von Waldersee
- Wilhelm, German Crown Prince
- Wilhelm II, German Emperor
- Prince Wilhelm of Prussia (1783–1851)
- Wilhelm, Duke of Urach
- William I of Württemberg
- William I, German Emperor
- William II, Elector of Hesse
- William II of Württemberg
- William III of the Netherlands
- William Ernest, Grand Duke of Saxe-Weimar-Eisenach
- Prince William of Baden (1829–1897)
- Prince William of Hesse-Philippsthal-Barchfeld
- William, Duke of Brunswick
- William, Prince of Hohenzollern
- Maximilian von Wimpffen
- Duke Eugen of Württemberg (1846–1877)

=== Commanders 1st Class ===
- Rudolf von Delbrück
- Joseph von Radowitz

=== Commanders 2nd Class ===
- Count Nikolay Adlerberg
- Antoni Wilhelm Radziwiłł

=== Other Classes ===
- Bar, Johann Baptist von
- Felix Graf von Bothmer
- Johann Dzierzon
- Prince Franz of Bavaria
- Ivan Fullon
- Alexander Gorchakov
- Benedict Samuel Levi
- Maximilian Karl Lamoral O'Donnell
- Karl Schlösser
