= Julius Schoppe =

German painter

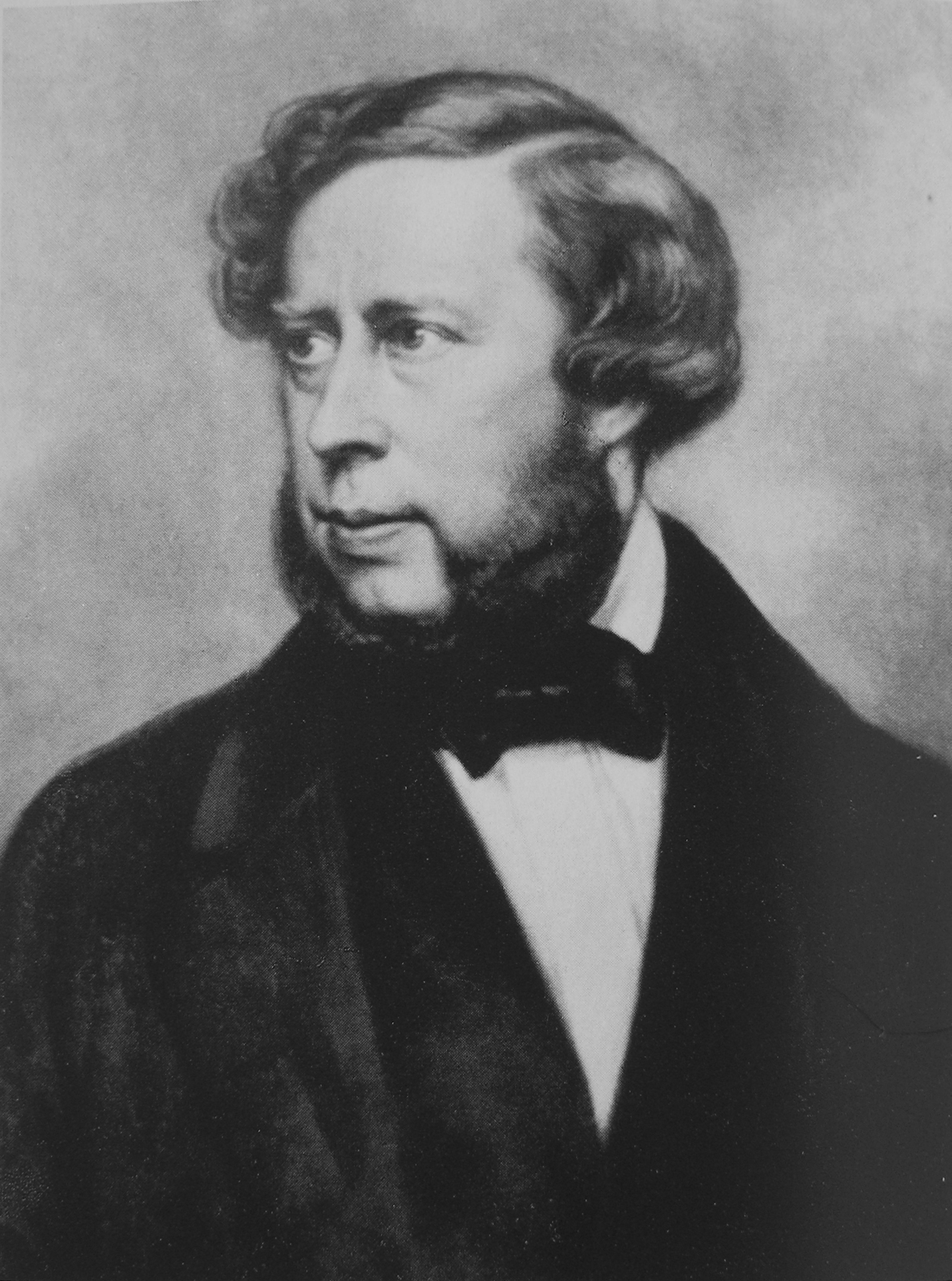
Self-portrait (1855)

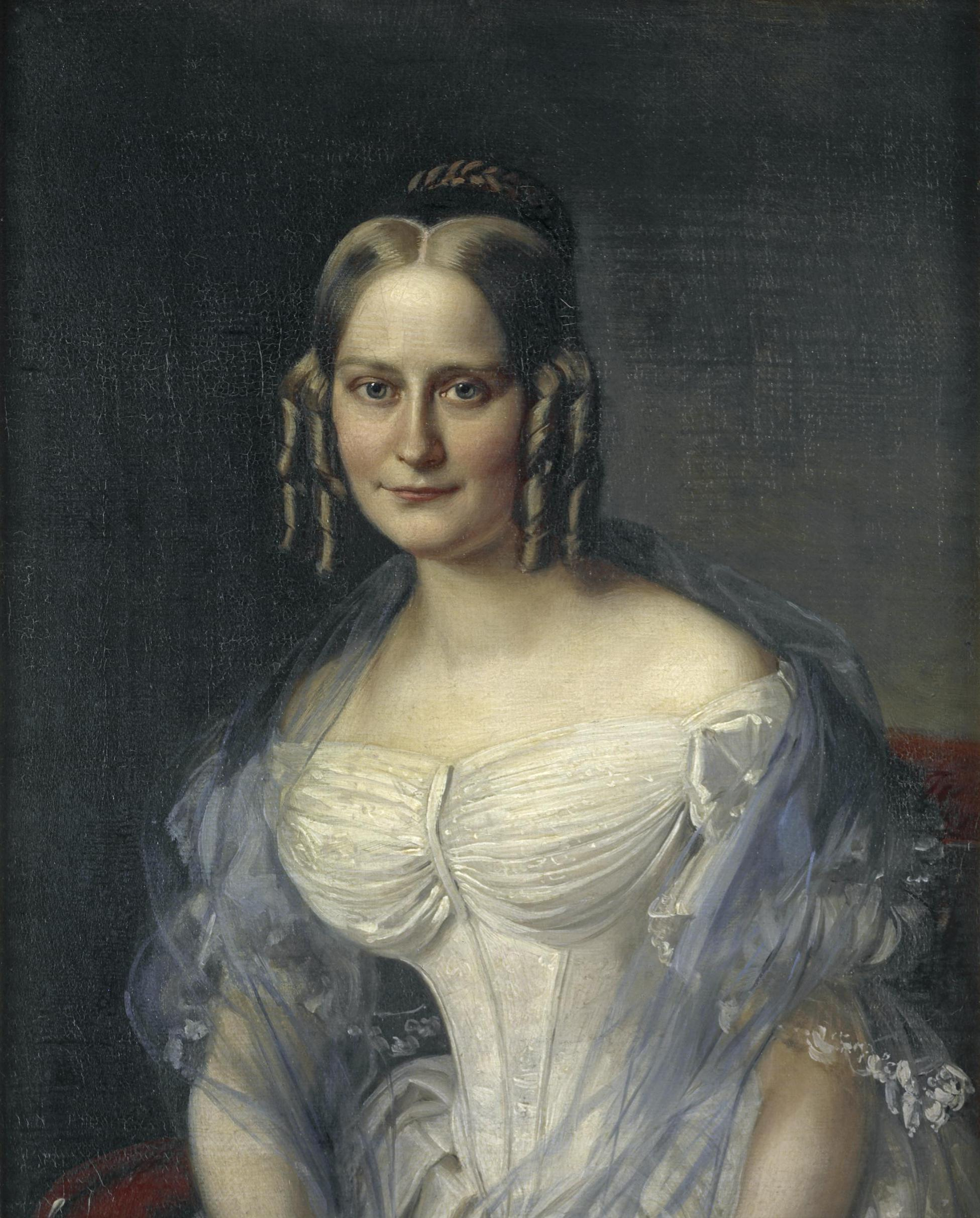
Portrait of Mathilde von Stürler-Böttiche (1838)

Julius Schoppe (27 January 1795, Berlin - 30 March 1868, Berlin) was a German portrait, landscape, history and fresco painter in the Biedermeier style.

== Life and career ==
He came from a family of goldsmiths and was related to the sculptor Johann Gottfried Schadow. From 1810 to 1817, he was enrolled at the Prussian Academy of Arts, where he studied under Samuel Rösel. A stay in Vienna from 1815 to 1816 was followed the next year by a hike through Austria and Switzerland that ended in Rome. The sketches he made during this trip were published as a series of lithographs from 1823 to 1825. He lived in Rome until 1822 (with a fellowship from the Academy) at the Casa Buti, which was also the home of Bertel Thorvaldsen and Wilhelm von Humboldt, among others. While there, he made copies of many Renaissance paintings by Raphael, Titian and Correggio. Seven of his copies found their way into the Raphael Collection of King Friedrich Wilhelm IV in the Orangerie at Sanssouci.

Upon his return to Berlin, he was named a member of the Academy and was appointed a Professor in 1836. He specialized in portraits and was especially esteemed for his portrayals of children. He also did decorative painting, from designs by Karl Friedrich Schinkel, including the tea room of Princess Elisabeth in the Berliner Stadtschloss and the entryway of the "New Pavilion" near the Schloss Charlottenburg, both of which were later destroyed.

Among those that survive are paintings in the palace of Prince Charles near the Wilhelmplatz, the tea room of the "Kleinen Neugierde", a cottage in the pleasure ground of the Glienicke Palace, and frescoes on the ceiling at the Berlin State Opera.
