= Emperor Frederick =

Emperor Frederick may refer to:

- Frederick Barbarossa (Frederick I), Holy Roman Emperor
- Frederick II, Holy Roman Emperor (1194–1250)
- Frederick III, Holy Roman Emperor (1415–1493)
- Frederick III, German Emperor, first Hohenzollern German emperor
- Emperor Frederick, evil emperor in the Dune II game
