= Grand Duchess Alexandra Nikolaevna of Russia =

Grand Duchess Alexandra Nikolaevna
- Princess Frederick William of Hesse-Kassel
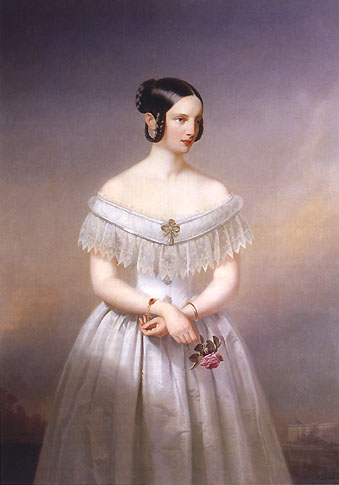
- Posthumous portrait, currently on display at Hermitage Museum
- Born: 24 June 1825; Tsarskoye Selo, Russian Empire
- Died: 10 August 1844 (aged 19); St. Petersburg, Russian Empire
- Burial: Grand Ducal Mausoleum
- Spouse: Prince Frederick William of Hesse-Kassel (m. 1844)
- Issue: Prince Wilhelm of Hesse-Kassel
- House: Romanov
- Father: Nicholas I of Russia
- Mother: Charlotte of Prussia

Grand Duchess Alexandra Nikolaevna of Russia (24 June [O.S. 12 June] 1825 – 10 August 1844) was the youngest daughter and fourth child of Tsar Nicholas I, Emperor of Russia, and his wife, Alexandra Feodorovna, née Charlotte of Prussia. Alexandra Nikolaevna was a younger sister of Tsar Alexander II of Russia. A favorite of the family, Alexandra died at nineteen in childbirth due to complications related to tuberculosis.

== Biography ==
=== Early life ===
Alexandra Nikolaevna was born on June 24, 1825 at Tsarskoe Selo. The third and final daughter of Nicholas I and Alexandra Feodorovna, Alexandra Nikolaevna, known in the family as "Adini," was the namesake of her paternal aunt, Grand Duchess Alexandra Pavlovna, who died in childbirth in 1801. According to her elder sister, Olga's, memoirs, Alexandra had inherited her mother's "Prussian look." Alexandra was also said to have resembled her late maternal grandmother, Queen Louise of Prussia. Nicholas affectionately spoke of Adini as "... a little moppet, but very sweet".

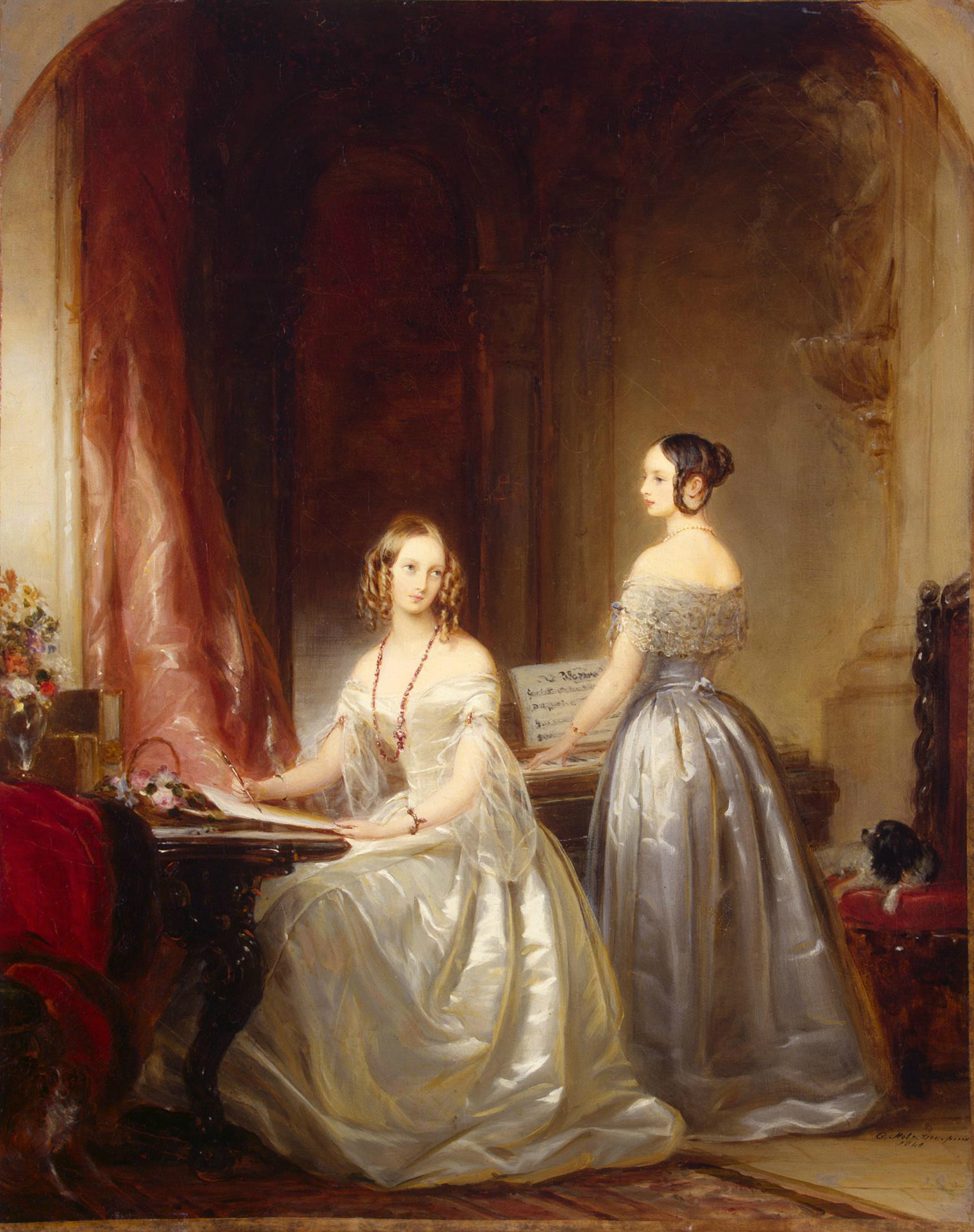
Adini (right) with her older sister, Grand Duchess Olga.

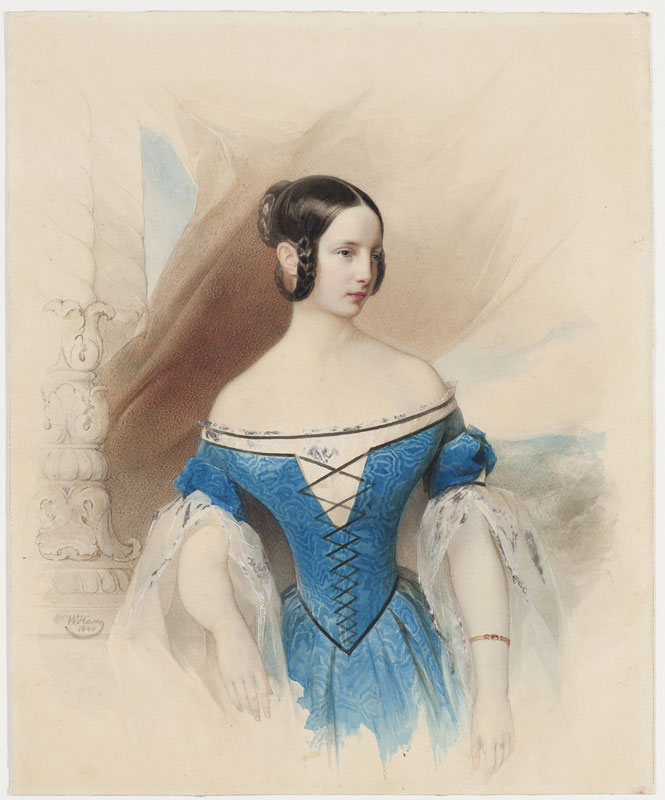
Alexandra at age 15, four years before her marriage

Alexandra was well known in Saint Petersburg society for both her wit and unique personality. A student of vocal music, she qualified for lessons from the soprano Henriette Sontag.

=== Marriage ===
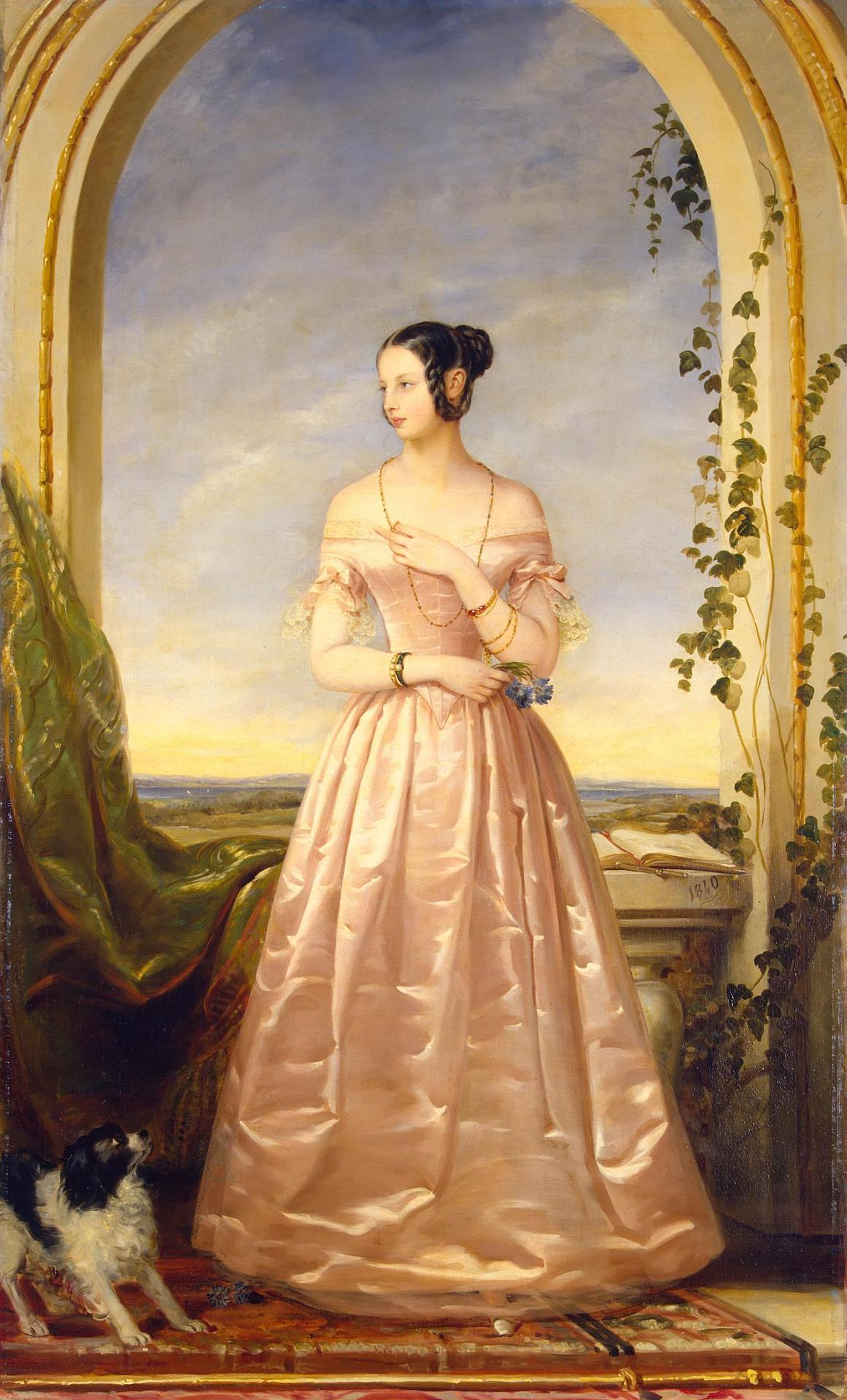
Alexandra Nikolaevna by Christina Robertson, Hermitage Museum

On 28 January 1844, Alexandra married Prince Frederick William of Hesse (1820–1884) in St. Petersburg. Her husband was the only son of Prince William of Hesse and Princess Charlotte of Denmark. Since childhood he lived in Copenhagen with his parents and was regarded as one of the strongest candidates as heir to the Danish throne as there was a lack of direct male heirs in the royal family. Thus it was important for him to find a wife that could back his claim. "Fritz", as he was called, had come to St. Petersburg as a prospective bridegroom for Olga, but fell in love with Alexandra instead. Although Olga was the elder daughter and also found Frederick to be an engaging young man, she stepped aside in favour of her sister, chaperoning the couple when they wanted to spend time together away from the prying eyes of the court. Nicholas I and Alexandra Feodorovna gave their permission for Alexandra Nikolaevna and Frederick to be married. Frederick's uncle, king Christian VIII of Denmark purchased Dehn Mansion in Copenhagen and Bernstorff Palace outside the city for the newlyweds.

=== Death ===
Alexandra became acutely ill with tuberculosis shortly before her wedding, and this complicated the pregnancy which soon followed. She was never well enough to travel to Hesse and take up her new position with her husband. They stayed in St. Petersburg, where her health rapidly declined.

She went into labor prematurely, three months before the child was due, and gave birth to a son, Wilhelm. The infant died shortly after he was born, and Alexandra died later the same day. She was the first of her parents' children to die. Her parents were devastated and their grief would last until the end of their lives. She was buried at the Peter and Paul Fortress in St. Petersburg. Her son was buried in Rumpenheim (Germany).

Nine years later, Frederick married Alexandra's first cousin, Princess Anna of Prussia (1836–1918). He later became head of the House of Hesse-Kassel. Although they had six children together, Fritz and Anna were never emotionally close; it is speculated that one reason was due to Frederick's inability to overcome his grief for his first wife.

== Legacy ==
In the gardens of the Petergof palace near Saint Petersburg there is a memorial bench with a small sculpture bust of the Grand Duchess. Her rooms there have been preserved just as they were at the time of her death.

Six sheaves of wheat made of diamonds, which came to Hesse on one of the dresses in Alexandra's trousseau, were transformed into a tiara by Anna around 1900. This tiara is now the traditional wedding tiara of the Hessian princely family, and was last worn by Countess Floria Franziska of Faber-Castell when in 2003, she married Donatus, Hereditary Prince of Hesse, Alexandra's husband's great-great-grandson by his second marriage.

== Ancestry ==
Ancestors of Grand Duchess Alexandra Nikolaevna of Russia

8. Peter III of Russia
4. Paul I of Russia
9. Catherine the Great
2. Nicholas I of Russia
10. Frederick II Eugene, Duke of Württemberg
5. Duchess Sophie Dorothea of Württemburg
11. Princess Friederike of Brandenburg-Schwedt
1. Grand Duchess Alexandra Nikolaevna of Russia
12. Frederick William II of Prussia
6. Frederick William III of Prussia
13. Princess Frederica Louisa of Hesse-Darmstadt
3. Princess Charlotte of Prussia
14. Charles II, Grand Duke of Mecklenburg-Strelitz
7. Duchess Louise of Mecklenburg-Strelitz
15. Princess Friederike of Hesse-Darmstadt

== Sources ==
- Hesse: A Princely German Collection. Catalog of exhibition at the Portland Art Museum, 2005. John E. Buchanan Jr., Director, The Marilyn H. and Dr. Robert B. Pamplin Jr. Collection.
- Olga, Queen of Wuerttemberg. Traum der Jugend goldener Stern. Günther Neske Verlag, 1955.
