= Wolzogen =

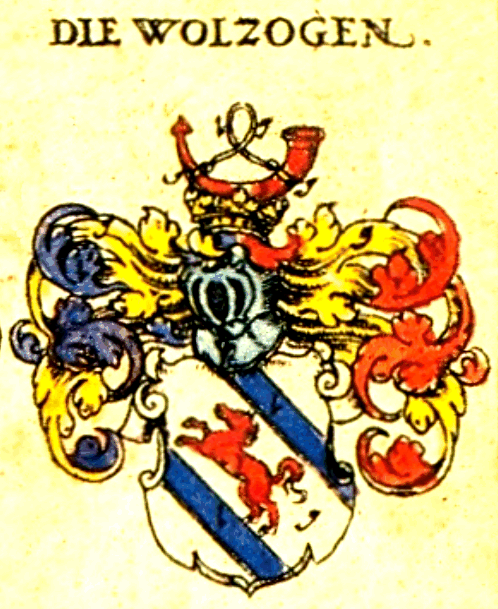
Coat of arms of the Wolzogen family

The von Wolzogen family is an old German noble family that originated from Lower Austria, whose members distinguished themselves mostly in the Kingdom of Prussia and later with the VOC to Indonesia, and were famous for their artistry and culture.

== Notable members ==
- Johann Ludwig von Wolzogen (1599, in Nové Zámky – 1661), Hungarian-born Austrian nobleman and Socinian theologian
- Caroline von Wolzogen, née von Lengefeld (1763–1847), German writer
- Karl von Wolzogen (1764-1808), German soldier and official in Dutch service
- Ludwig von Wolzogen (1773–1845), Prussian general
- Hans Paul von Wolzogen (1848, in Potsdam – 1938, in Bayreuth)
- Ernst von Wolzogen (1855–1934), a cultural critic, writer, and founder of Cabaret in Germany
- Elsa Laura Wolzogen (1876-1945), German composer and lute player
