= Princess Marie of Saxe-Weimar-Eisenach (1808–1877) =

- Princess Charles of Prussia
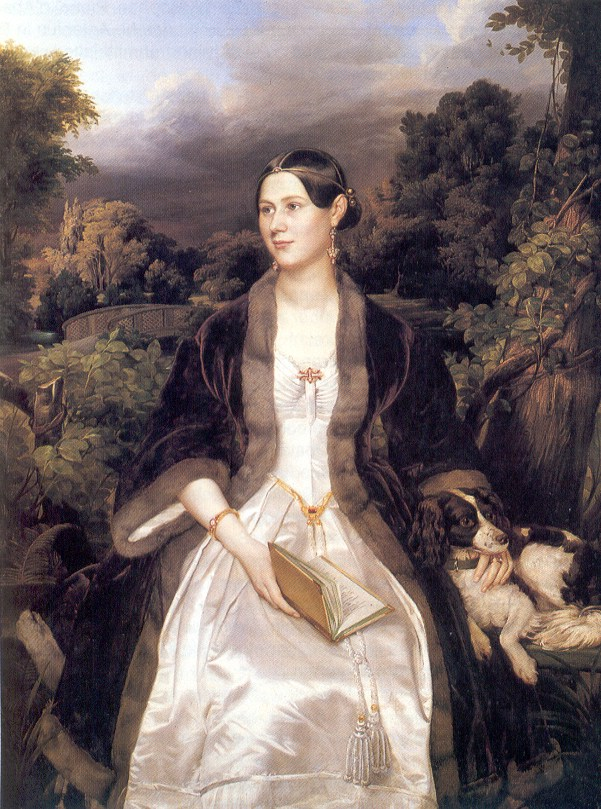
- Painting by Julius Schoppe in 1838
- Born: 3 February 1808; Weimar, Duchy of Saxe-Weimar
- Died: 18 January 1877 (aged 68); Berlin, Kingdom of Prussia, German Empire
- Spouse: Prince Charles of Prussia (m. 1827)
- Issue: Prince Friedrich Karl; Louise, Landgravine of Hesse-Philippsthal-Barchfeld; Anna, Landgravine of Hesse
Names
- Marie Luise Alexandrina
- House: Saxe-Weimar-Eisenach
- Father: Charles Frederick, Grand Duke of Saxe-Weimar-Eisenach
- Mother: Grand Duchess Maria Pavlovna of Russia

Princess Marie of Saxe-Weimar-Eisenach (Marie Luise Alexandrina; 3 February 1808 in Weimar – 18 January 1877 in Berlin) was a princess of Saxe-Weimar-Eisenach, by birth, and, by marriage, a princess of Prussia. She was the daughter of Charles Frederick, Grand Duke of Saxe-Weimar-Eisenach and Grand Duchess Maria Pavlovna of Russia.

== Youth ==
Princess Marie was the eldest daughter of Prince, and later Grand Duke, Charles Frederick of Saxe-Weimar-Eisenach and his wife, Grand Duchess Maria Pavlovna, who was the sister of Emperor Alexander I of Russia. Her father was a shy man, whose favourite reading material were fairy tales until the end of his life. Her mother, by contrast, was "one of the most significant women of her time", according to Johann Wolfgang von Goethe. Marie and her younger sister Augusta, who became German Empress, received a comprehensive education, which focused on the courtly ceremonial duties they were to have as adults. This education included painting lessons by the court painter Louise Seidler and music lessons by the court conductor Johann Nepomuk Hummel.

Marie grew up at the court in Weimar, which was considered one of the most liberal in Germany. Saxe-Weimar-Eisenach adopted a constitution in 1816. The court was very receptive towards literature and other art forms, due to the influence of the late Duchess Anna Amalia, who had died in 1807. Goethe had been managing the court theater in Weimar until 1817 and remained a welcome guest at the ducal court afterwards.

Marie's grandfather, Duke Charles August was raised to Grand Duke in 1815, due to the influence of the Tsar and his own attitude at the Congress of Vienna. This allowed Marie to use the style Royal Highness. Saxe-Weimar-Eisenach also achieved a considerable territorial expansion during the Congress of Vienna.

== Marriage ==
=== Negotiating a marriage ===
Marie was 16 years old when she first met her future husband, Prince Charles of Prussia, in Frankfurt an der Oder in 1824. He was the third son of King Frederick William III of Prussia and Louise of Mecklenburg-Strelitz. Grand Duchess Maria Pavlovna and her two daughters were travelling to Russia and had arranged to meet her brother, Grand Duke, and later Tsar, Nicholas, and his wife Alexandra Feodorovna in Frankfurt. When they arrived in Frankfurt, they were welcomed by Prince Charles and his brother William I.

King Frederick William III was in favour of Charles marrying Marie and immediately contacted the courts in Saint Petersburg and Weimar to negotiate a marriage arrangement. At the time, Maria Feodorovna, the mother of the Tsar, was still the authority in family matters. Neither she, nor Grand Duchess Maria Pavlovna, gave the response that Frederick William III had hoped for. Both courts were hoping that Marie could marry an heir to the throne, albeit a throne of a smaller country. The third son of a king was not quite what they had in mind.

The Russians proposed that Marie could marry William and his younger brother Charles would marry her younger sister Augusta. This would be a better fit in terms of age and would certainly satisfy the court in Weimar, and William liked Marie more than he did Augusta. Frederick William III, however, saw nothing in this proposal, which completely ignored the feelings of his sons.

Things were further complicated by William's being in love with Princess Elisa Radziwill. Grand Duchess Maria Pavlovna tried to defame Ms. Radziwiłł with every means available. Outwardly, she did not want to base her daughter's marriage on the ruins of William's happiness. She hoped that William would marry Elisa morganatically, not have a legitimate heir, and the Prussian throne would be inherited by the heirs of Charles and Marie. So she would not actually have been very happy if William were to break off his relationship with Elisa and marry a lady of his own rank and have legitimate heirs. An ally in her quest to paint Elisa as lower nobility was Grand Duke George of Mecklenburg-Strelitz, brother of Charles and William's late mother Queen Louise.

Negotiations had already lasted more than two years when Maria Feodorovna managed to persuade her daughter to agree to a marriage between Charles and Marie, without putting any conditions on William.

=== Two marriages ===
On 26 May 1827, Princess Marie married Prince Charles of Prussia in Charlottenburg (now part of Berlin). Their son, Frederich Charles, was born 10 months later. Marie's sister Augusta and Charles' brother Wilhelm (William) gave in to dynastic pressure and married two years later. Their marriage, however, was complex and privately happy one. William regarded his wife as an "outstanding personality", but also as less charming than her older sister; he wrote "the Princess is nice and clever, but she leaves me cold.". Augusta, on the other hand, did at first like her husband and was full of hope for a happy marriage. She was aware of his unrequited love of Elisa Radziwiłł, but she was able to replace her in ways.

=== Issue ===
Charles and Marie had three children:

- Prince Frederick Charles of Prussia (20 March 1828 – 15 June 1885); married Princess Maria Anna of Anhalt-Dessau. They had five children.
- Princess Louise of Prussia (1 March 1829 – 10 May 1901); married Alexis, Landgrave of Hesse-Philippsthal-Barchfeld (1828–1905).
- Princess Anna of Prussia (17 May 1836 – 12 June 1918); married Frederick William, Landgrave of Hesse-Kassel. They had six children.

== Court life ==
Marie's younger sister Augusta was married to the then Crown Prince Wilhelm (William) of Prussia. Marie consequently had lower status, being married to a mere Prince. She and her husband always resented their inferior position at court. While Charles took out his frustrations on womanizing and political schemes, Marie vied with Augusta over clothes, wigs, and jewels. Charles and Marie ran a fashionable household, surrounding themselves with high society, unlike the sober Wilhelm and intellectual Augusta.

Marie loathed both her sister and her successor Victoria, Princess Royal (married to the then Crown Prince Frederick). As Victoria was British, most of the vehemently anti-British court was in agreement with Marie that it would have been better had the marriage never occurred. In one letter, Victoria wrote her mother Queen Victoria stating that she overheard Marie being told by her sister-in-law the Grand Duchess of Mecklenburg-Schwerin how "she never ceased regretting that there is an Englishwoman in the family".

=== Life in Berlin and Glienicke ===
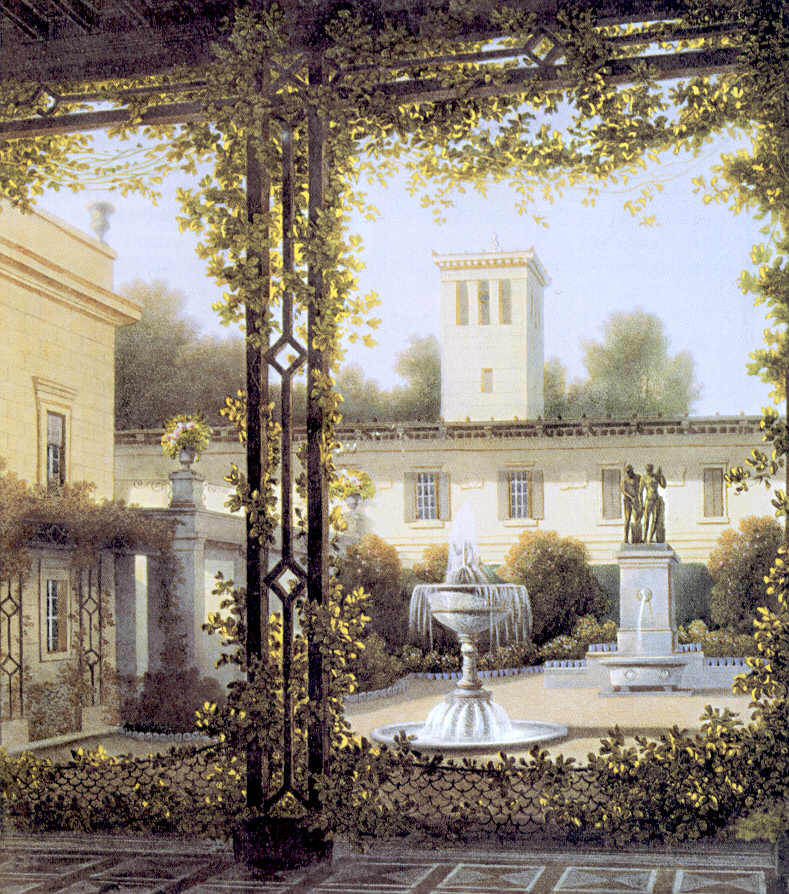
The garden courtyard in Glienicke, painting by August C. Haun after Wilhelm Schirmer, 1837

From 1829, the young family lived in their winter residence Prince Charles Palace at Wilhelmplatz No. 8–9 in Berlin, which had been rebuilt according to a design by Karl Friedrich Schinkel.

In 1824, Prince Charles had purchased a country house in today's Volkspark Glienicke. Between 1824 and 1826, it was rebuilt by Karl Friedrich Schinkel and became Glienicke Palace. This was Charles' and Marie's favourite residence. They added a casino, and the Kleine Neugierde, which was decorated with antique mosaics from Carthage. In 1835, the rotunda Große Neugierde was added and, in the following years, the park was extended.

In 1859, Charles purchased Jagdschloss Glienicke for his son Frederick Charles.

=== Second Schleswig War ===
On 7 December 1865, King William I appointed Princess Marie as Royal Colonel of the First Westphalian Field Regiment No. 7, in recognition of the regiment's achievements during the Second Schleswig War, against Denmark in 1864. Her son Frederick Charles was a General of the cavalry during this war and had commanded the Prussian troops during the decisive Battle of Dybbøl.

== Death ==
Marie died on 18 January 1877 in Berlin, at the age of 68. Her husband had a vault constructed under the church of Ss. Peter and Paul in the Glienicke park. On his own death in 1883, he was buried beside her.

== Ancestry ==
Ancestors of Princess Marie of Saxe-Weimar-Eisenach (1808–1877)

8. Ernest Augustus II, Duke of Saxe-Weimar-Eisenach
4. Charles Augustus, Grand Duke of Saxe-Weimar-Eisenach
9. Duchess Anna Amalia of Brunswick-Wolfenbüttel
2. Charles Frederick, Grand Duke of Saxe-Weimar-Eisenach
10. Louis IX, Landgrave of Hesse-Darmstadt
5. Princess Louise of Hesse-Darmstadt
11. Countess Palatine Caroline of Zweibrücken
1. Princess Marie of Saxe-Weimar-Eisenach
12. Peter III of Russia
6. Paul I of Russia
13. Catherine II of Russia
3. Grand Duchess Maria Pavlovna of Russia
14. Frederick II Eugene, Duke of Württemberg
7. Duchess Sophie Dorothea of Württemburg
15. Princess Friederike of Brandenburg-Schwedt
