= Prince Frederick William of Hesse-Kassel =

Frederick William II
- Landgrave of Hesse
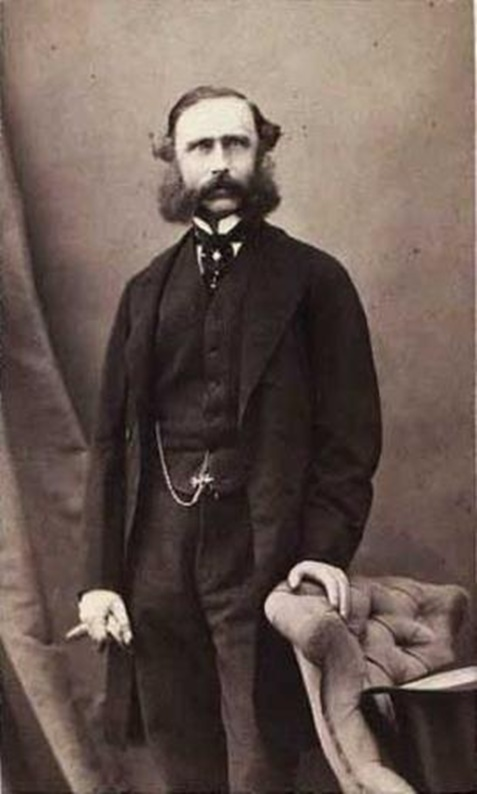

Head of the House of Hesse-Kassel
- Tenure: 6 January 1875 – 14 October 1884
- Predecessor: Frederick William I
- Successor: Frederick William III
- Born: 26 November 1820
- Died: 14 October 1884 (aged 63)
- Spouse: Grand Duchess Alexandra Nikolaevna of Russia (m. 1844; died 1844) Princess Anna of Prussia (m. 1853)
- Issue: Prince Wilhelm; Frederick William III, Landgrave of Hesse; Elisabeth, Hereditary Princess of Anhalt; Alexander Frederick, Landgrave of Hesse; Frederick Charles, Landgrave of Hesse and King-Elect of Finland; Marie-Polyxene; Sybille, Baroness Friedrich of Vincke
- House: Hesse-Kassel (agnatic); Oldenburg (cognatic)
- Father: Prince William of Hesse-Kassel
- Mother: Princess Charlotte of Denmark

Frederick William George Adolphus, Landgrave of Hesse (German: Friedrich Wilhelm Georg Adolf von Hessen-Kassel; 26 November 1820 – 14 October 1884) was the only son of Wilhelm I, Landgrave of Hesse-Kassel-Rumpenheim and Princess Louise Charlotte of Denmark.

== Early life and marriages ==
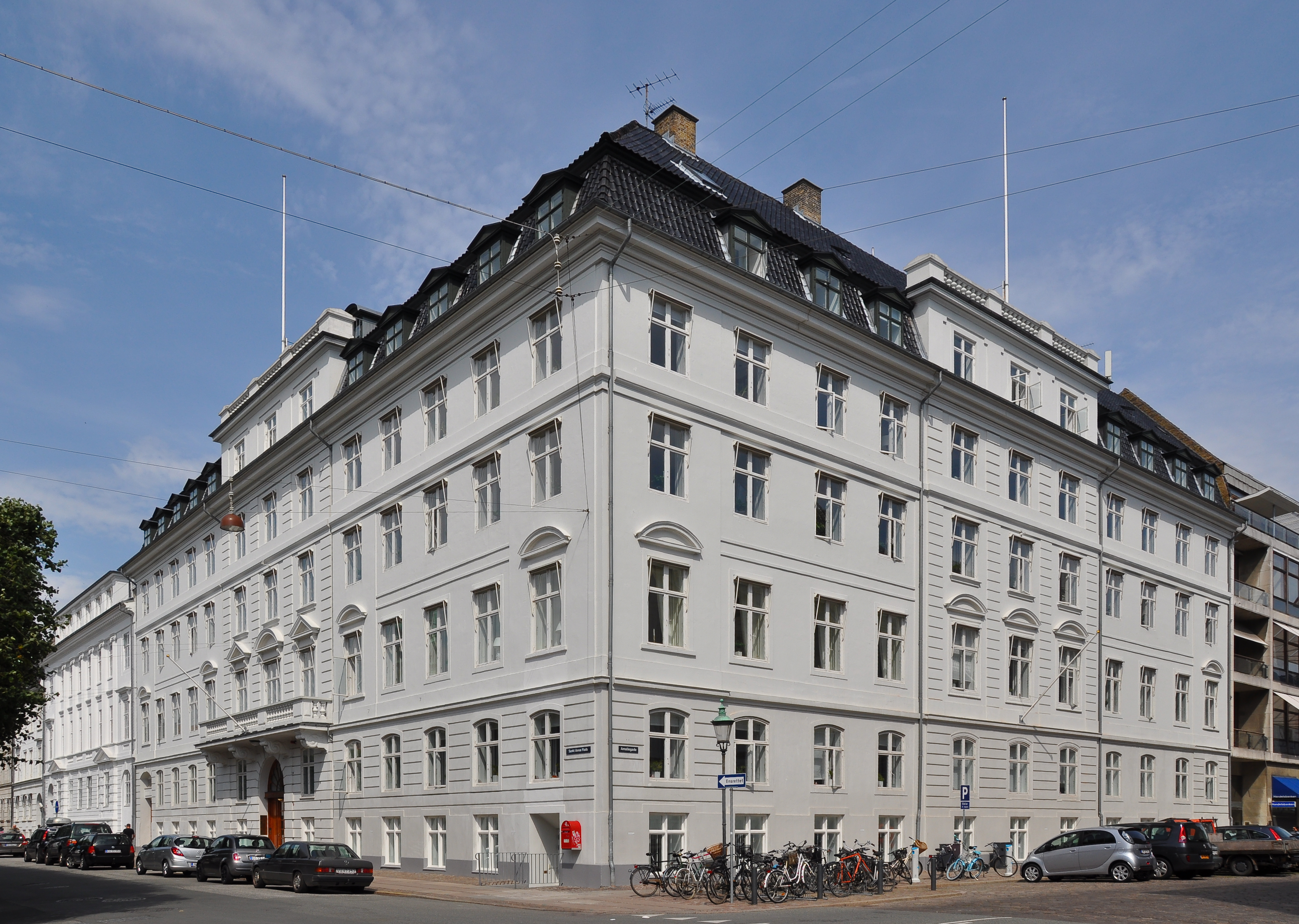
Prince Frederick William's childhood home, Prince William Mansion, Copenhagen at Sankt Annæ Plads in Copenhagen.

Prince Frederick William of Hesse-Kassel was born in Copenhagen on 26 November 1820. He moved to Denmark with his family at the age of three, and grew up there. He attended the university in Bonn, and then began a military career. In 1843 he was third in line for the Danish throne after the King's son and brother, Prince Ferdinand. His siblings included Louise of Hesse-Kassel, future Queen of Denmark, Princess Marie Luise Charlotte of Hesse-Kassel and Princess Auguste Sophie Friederike of Hesse-Kassel.

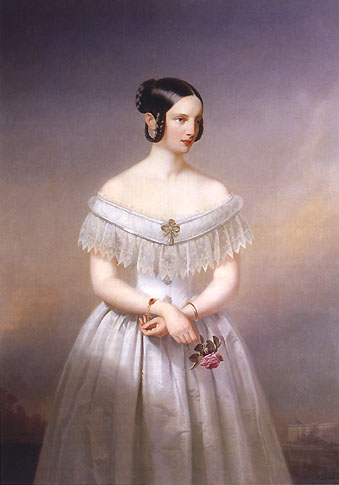
Grand Duchess Alexandra Nikolaevna of Russia

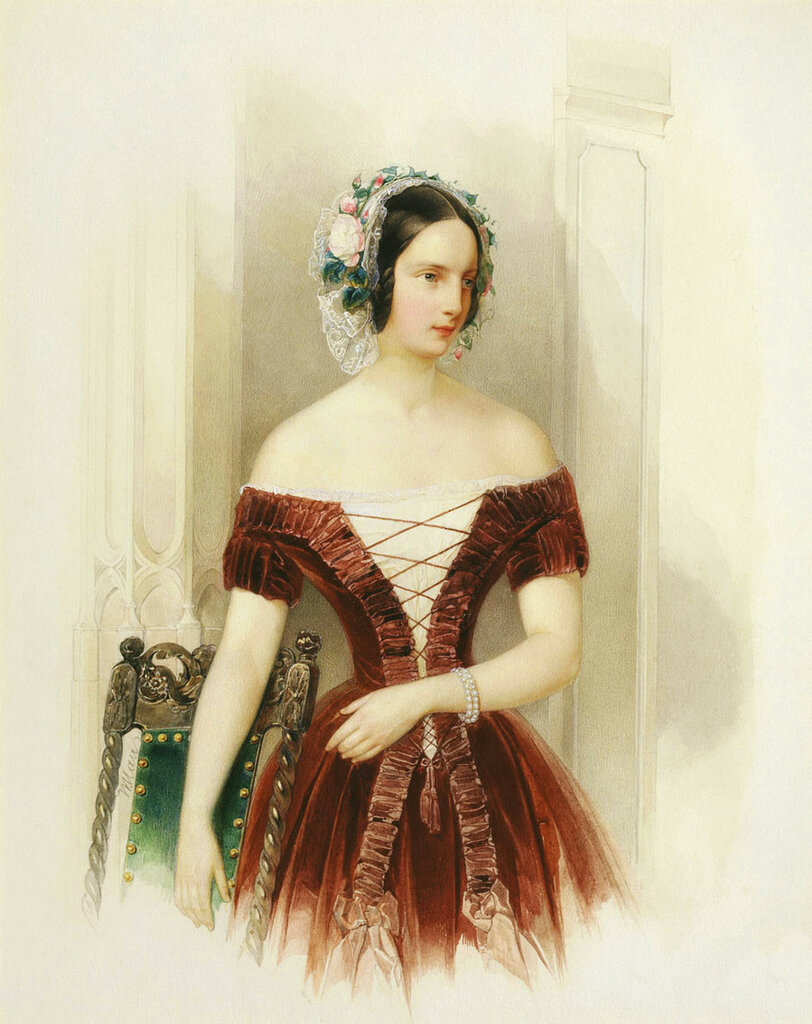
Another image of Alexandra Nikolaevna

On 28 January 1844, Frederick married Grand Duchess Alexandra Nikolaevna of Russia at St Petersburg. Frederick had come to St Petersburg as a prospective bridegroom for her sister Olga, but fell in love with Alexandra instead on the first evening he spent with the family. Although Olga was the elder daughter and also found Frederick to be an engaging young man, she stepped aside in favour of her sister, and even chaperoned the couple when they wanted to spend time together. The emperor and empress then gave their permission for Alexandra and Frederick to be married.

Alexandra became acutely ill with tuberculosis shortly before her wedding, and this complicated the pregnancy which soon followed. She was never well enough to travel to Hesse and take up her new position with her husband. They stayed in St. Petersburg, where her health rapidly declined. She went into labor prematurely, three months before the child was due, and gave birth to a son, Wilhelm. The infant died shortly after he was born, and Alexandra died later the same day. Her parents were devastated and their grief would last until the end of their lives. She was buried at the Peter and Paul Fortress in St. Petersburg. The son was buried in Rumpenheim, now a borough of Offenbach am Main, Germany.

In 1849 Frederick William joined HMS Cleopatra to train as a midshipman. The Cleopatra was reassigned to Singapore to take the place of HMS Maeander. She arrived in Singapore from Devonport via Rio de Janeiro under Captain Massie on 14 September 1849 and left with HMS Reynard for Labuan and China on 10 October. The Singapore paper mistakenly described the Prince as the son of the Danish king but the king had no sons, he was an heir to the throne.

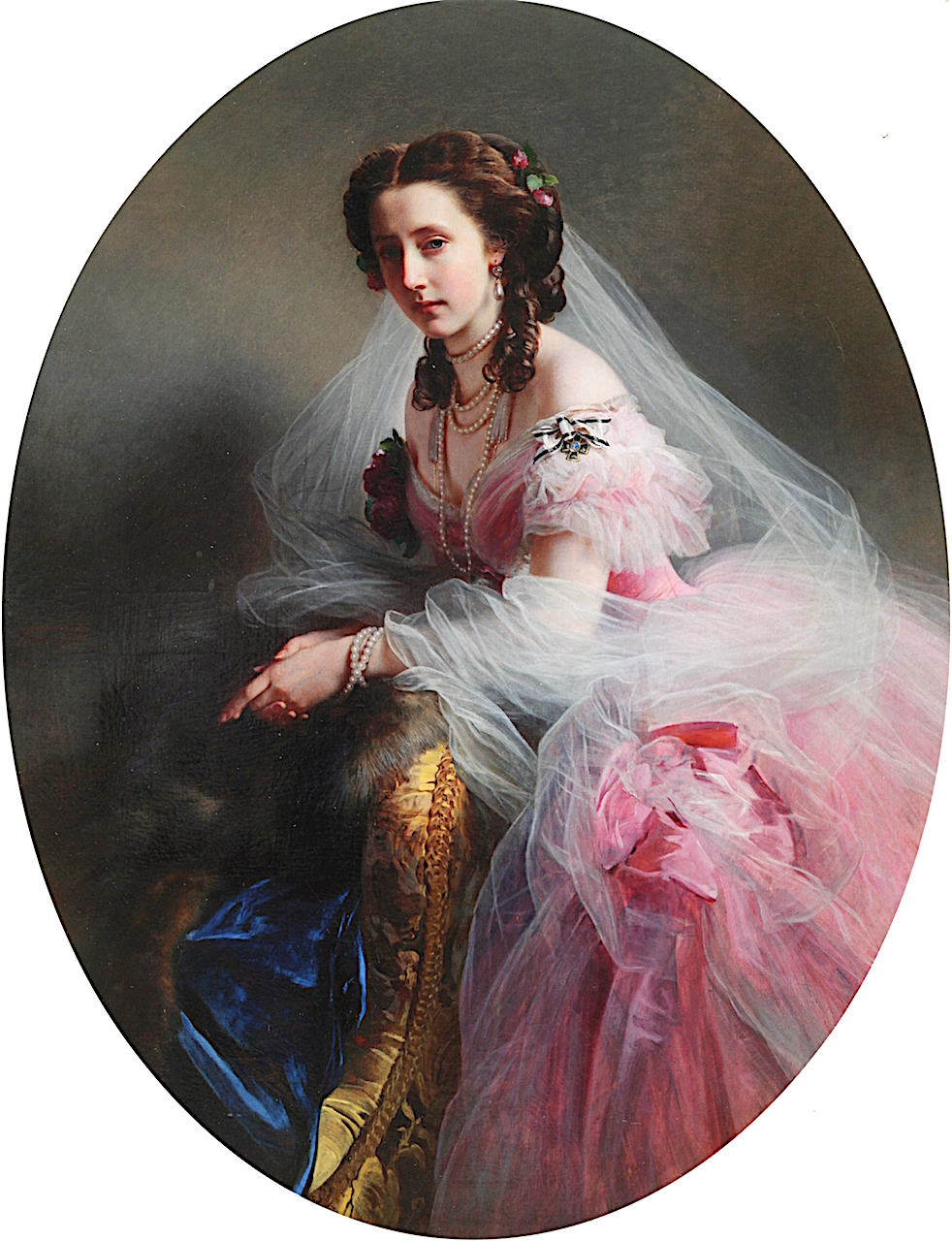
Princess Anna of Prussia

On 26 May 1853, Frederick married Alexandra's first cousin, Princess Anna of Prussia (1836–1918), at Charlottenburg Palace in Berlin. Although they had six children together, Frederick and Anna were never emotionally close, and it is speculated that one reason was because Fritz was unable to overcome his grief for his first wife. The couple first lived in Denmark in Dehn Mansion, a mansion Prince Frederick had bought in 1844.

== Children ==
His first wife was Grand Duchess Alexandra Nikolaevna of Russia (1825–1844), daughter of Emperor Nicholas I of Russia and Charlotte of Prussia. Alexandra died in childbirth, delivering a son who was born three months prematurely, and who died on the day of his birth:

- Prince Wilhelm (10 August 1844 – 10 August 1844)

His second wife was Princess Anna of Prussia (1836–1918), the youngest daughter of Prince Charles of Prussia and Princess Marie of Saxe-Weimar-Eisenach. They had six children:

- Prince Frederick William III of Hesse (15 October 1854 – 14 October 1888); never married; died at sea on a voyage from Batavia to Singapore.
- Princess Elisabeth Alexandra Charlotte of Hesse (13 June 1861 – 7 June 1955); married Leopold, Hereditary Prince of Anhalt in June 1884 and had issue.
- Prince Alexander Frederick of Hesse (25 January 1863 – 26 March 1945); married Baroness Gisela Stockhorner von Starheim.
- Prince Frederick Charles of Hesse, King of Finland (1 May 1868 – 28 May 1940); married Princess Margaret of Prussia and had issue.
- Princess Marie-Polyxene of Hesse (29 April 1872 – 16 August 1882).
- Princess Sybille Margaret Adelheid Louise of Hesse (3 June 1877 – 11 February 1925); married Friedrich Alexander Henry Robert Carl Albert, Baron von Vincke (divorced 1923).

== Elector of Hesse ==
He is important dynastically as a candidate for both the headship of the Hesse-Kassel dynasty (through his father) and for the Danish throne (through his mother). When Frederick William, deposed Elector of Hesse died in 1875, his sons were excluded from succession, because of his morganatic marriage. Therefore, Prince Frederick William succeeded the latter as titular Elector of Hesse.

Frederick William died on 14 October 1884 at Hamburg.

== Honours and awards ==
Friedrich Wilhelm received the following awards:

German decorations

- Hesse-Kassel: Grand Cross of the Golden Lion, 29 April 1840
- (Grand Duchy of Hesse) Hesse and by Rhine:
  - Grand Cross of the Ludwig Order, 7 September 1850
  - Grand Cross of the Merit Order of Philip the Magnanimous, with Swords, 18 January 1870
  - Military Merit Cross, 8 March 1871
  - Bronze Medal for the Campaign in France (1870-1871)
- Ascanian duchies: Grand Cross of the Order of Albert the Bear, 22 April 1857
- Baden:
  - Knight of the House Order of Fidelity, 1875
  - Grand Cross of the Zähringer Lion, 1875
- (Saxe-Coburg and Gotha) (Duchy of Saxe-Altenburg) (Saxe-Meiningen) Ernestine duchies: Grand Cross of the Saxe-Ernestine House Order, 1871
- Mecklenburg:
  - Grand Cross of the Wendish Crown, with Crown in Ore
  - Military Service Cross, 2nd Class (Schwerin)
- Nassau: Knight of the Gold Lion of Nassau, September 1858
- Oldenburg: Grand Cross of the Order of Duke Peter Friedrich Ludwig, with Golden Crown, 16 September 1869
- Prussia:
  - Knight of the Black Eagle, with Collar, 1 January 1853
  - Grand Cross of the Red Eagle
  - Iron Cross (1870), 2nd Class
- Saxe-Weimar-Eisenach: Grand Cross of the White Falcon, 9 June 1853
- Schaumburg-Lippe: Military Merit Medal
- Württemberg: Grand Cross of the Württemberg Crown, 1864

Foreign decorations

- Austrian Empire: Grand Cross of the Royal Hungarian Order of St. Stephen, 1860
- Denmark:
  - Knight of the Elephant, 28 June 1840
  - Cross of Honour of the Order of the Dannebrog, 28 June 1840
- Kingdom of Greece: Grand Cross of the Redeemer
- Russian Empire:
  - Knight of St. Andrew, in Diamonds, 1 July 1843
  - Knight of St. Alexander Nevsky
  - Knight of the White Eagle
  - Knight of St. Anna, 1st Class
  - Knight of St. George, 4th Class, 1878
- Sweden-Norway: Knight of the Seraphim, 2 November 1869

== Ancestry ==
Ancestors of Prince Frederick William of Hesse-Kassel

8. Frederick II, Landgrave of Hesse-Cassel
4. Prince Frederick of Hesse-Cassel
9. Princess Mary of Great Britain
2. Prince William of Hesse-Cassel
10. Charles William, Prince of Nassau-Usingen
5. Princess Caroline of Nassau-Usingen
11. Countess Caroline Felizitas of Leiningen-Dagsburg
1. Frederick William II, Landgrave of Hesse
12. Frederick V of Denmark
6. Frederick, Hereditary Prince of Denmark and Norway
13. Duchess Juliana Maria of Brunswick-Wolfenbüttel
3. Princess Louise Charlotte of Denmark
14. Duke Louis of Mecklenburg-Schwerin
7. Duchess Sophia Frederica of Mecklenburg-Schwerin
15. Princess Charlotte Sophie of Saxe-Coburg-Saalfeld

Titles in pretence
Preceded by Frederick William I	— TITULAR — Elector of Hesse; 1875–1884	Succeeded by Frederick William III
