= King Frederick =

King Frederick or King Frederik may refer to:

- Frederick I of Denmark
- Frederick II of Denmark
- Frederick III of Denmark
- Frederick IV of Denmark
- Frederick V of Denmark
- Frederick VI of Denmark
- Frederick VII of Denmark
- Frederik VIII of Denmark
- Frederik IX of Denmark
- Frederik X of Denmark
- Frederick I of Sweden
- Frederick I of Prussia, previously Frederick III, Elector of Brandenburg
- Frederick the Great (Frederick II of Prussia)
- Frederick III, German Emperor, and King of Prussia
- Frederick I of Württemberg (1754–1816)
- Frederick of Naples
- Frederick I, Holy Roman Emperor, also King of Italy
- Frederick II, Holy Roman Emperor, also King Frederick I of Sicily
- Frederick III, Holy Roman Emperor, also King of Italy
- Frederick III of Sicily
- Frederick the Simple
- Frederick the Fair
- Frederick V of the Palatinate, also King Frederick I of Bohemia

In addition, a number of kings of Prussia were named Frederick William:

- Frederick William I of Prussia (1688–1740)
- Frederick William II of Prussia (1744–1797)
- Frederick William III of Prussia (1770–1840)
- Frederick William IV (1795–1861)

In addition, a number of kings of Saxony were named Frederick Augustus:

- Frederick Augustus I of Saxony (1750–1827)
- Frederick Augustus II of Saxony (1797–1854)
- Frederick Augustus III of Saxony (1865–1932)
