= Prince Charles of Prussia =

Prussian prince and military general (1801–1883)

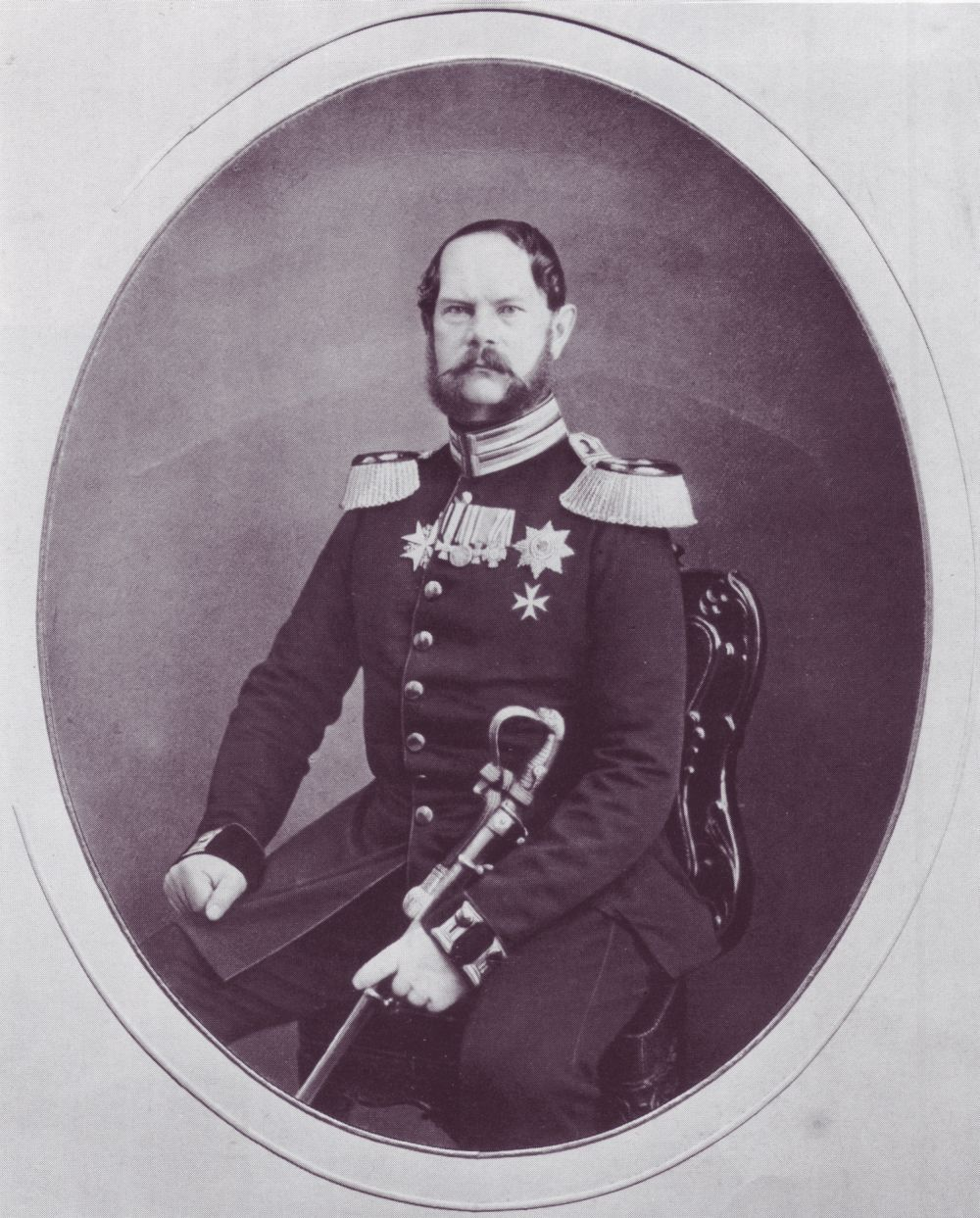
- Prince Charles c. 1860
- Born: 29 June 1801; Charlottenburg Palace, Brandenburg, Holy Roman Empire
- Died: 21 January 1883 (aged 81); Berlin, German Empire
- Burial: Ss. Peter and Paul, Wannsee, Berlin
- Spouse: Princess Marie of Saxe-Weimar-Eisenach (m. 1827; died 1877)
- Issue: Prince Friedrich Karl; Louise, Landgravine of Hesse-Philippsthal-Barchfeld; Anna, Landgravine of Hesse
Names
- German: Friedrich Karl Alexander; English: Frederick Charles Alexander
- House: House of Hohenzollern
- Father: Frederick William III of Prussia
- Mother: Louise of Mecklenburg-Strelitz

Prince Frederick Charles Alexander of Prussia (German: Friedrich Karl Alexander; 29 June 1801 – 21 January 1883) was a younger son of Frederick William III of Prussia. He served as a Prussian general for much of his adult life and became the first Herrenmeister (Grand Master) of the Order of Saint John after its restoration as a chivalric order. Nevertheless, he is perhaps remembered more often for his patronage of art and for his sizable collections of art and armor.

== Background and family ==
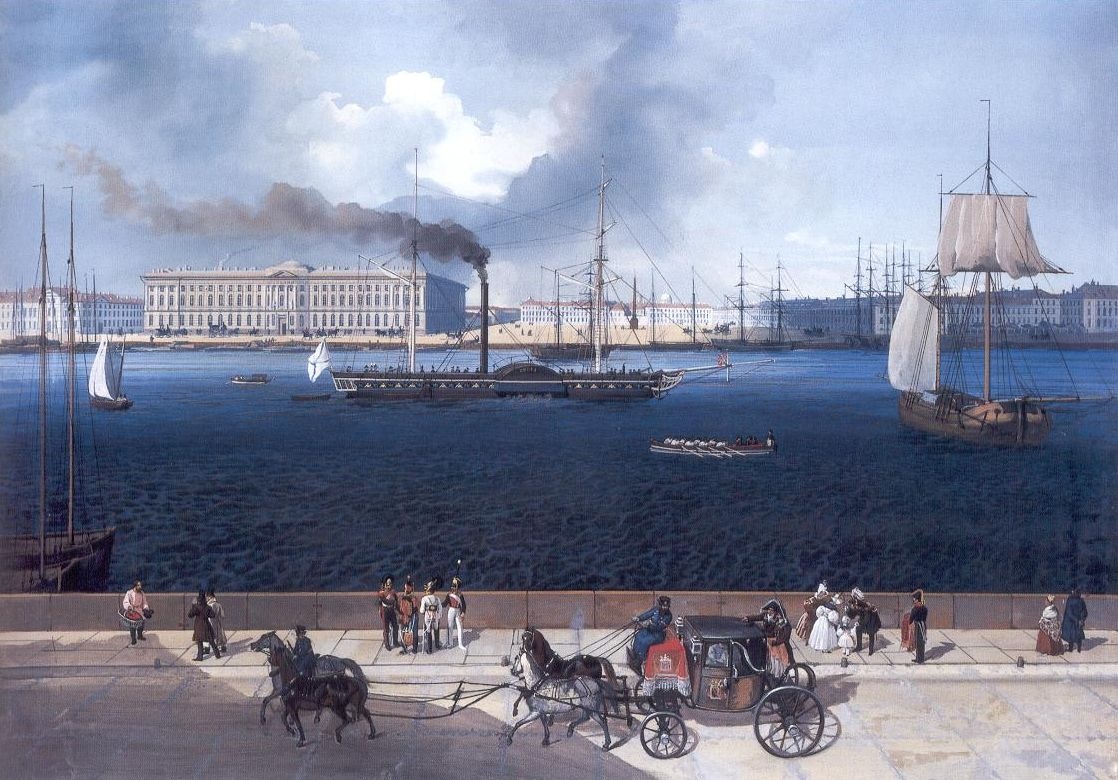
The Prussian Crown Prince and Princess arrive on the steamer "Ishora" in St. Petersburg in June 1834, painting by Leopold Ludwig Müller

Charles was born in Charlottenburg Palace near Berlin, the third son of Frederick William III of Prussia by his first wife, Louise of Mecklenburg-Strelitz. He was named Frederick Charles Alexander at birth, but came to be known as Charles, because there were several other Fredericks in his family at that time. His father was already King of Prussia by the time of Charles' birth, and both of his elder brothers were to succeed to the throne, while his elder sister Charlotte would marry Tsar Nicholas I of Russia. Charles also had two younger sisters, Alexandra and Louise, and a younger brother, Albert. His male line granddaughter Princess Louise Margaret of Prussia married Prince Arthur, Duke of Connaught and Strathearn, third son of Queen Victoria.

== Army career ==
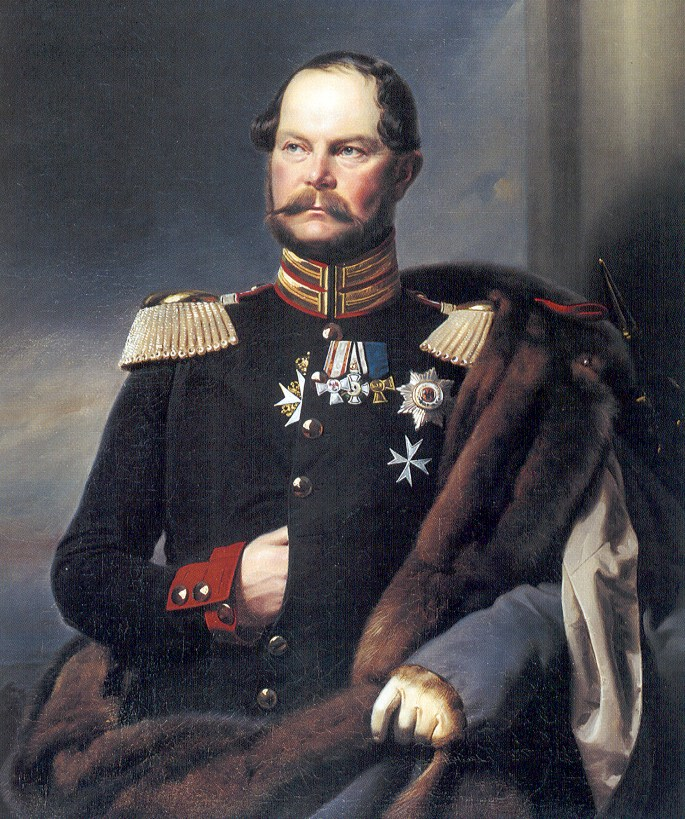
Portrait by Franz Krüger, 1852

Prince Charles entered the Prussian army in 1811 at the age of ten, with the rank of lieutenant in a regiment of the guards. In 1819, he became a member of the Prussian Staatsrat. In 1820, he became a major in the First Regiment of Foot Guards. In 1822, he became colonel of the 12th Infantry Regiment. In 1824, he was promoted to major general. In 1830, he commanded the 2nd Guards Division. He was further promoted to lieutenant-general in 1832 and general of infantry in 1844. He served as Inspector-General (1848) and as Generalfeldzeugmeister and chief of the artillery (1854).

Charles served as Governor of Mainz from 1864 to 1866. In 1852, he became Herrenmeister of the Order of Saint John (Bailiwick of Brandenburg).

== Marriage and issue ==
On 26 May 1827 in Charlottenburg, Charles married Princess Marie of Saxe-Weimar-Eisenach, a daughter of Charles Frederick, Grand Duke of Saxe-Weimar-Eisenach and his wife Grand Duchess Maria Pavlovna of Russia. Two years later, in 1829, Marie's younger sister Augusta would marry Charles' older brother, Wilhelm, the future Kaiser.

Charles and Marie had three children together:

Image	Name	Birth	Death	Notes
	Prince Friedrich Karl Nikolaus of Prussia	20 March 1828	15 June 1885	Married Princess Maria Anna of Anhalt-Dessau; father of 1 son and 3 daughters including Louise Margaret, Duchess of Connaught and Strathearn.
	Princess Marie Louise Anna of Prussia	1 March 1829	10 May 1901	Married Alexis, Landgrave of Hesse-Philippsthal-Barchfeld
	Princess Maria Anna Friederike of Prussia	17 May 1836	12 June 1918	Married Friedrich Wilhelm of Hesse-Kassel

The family lived in Wilhelmstrasse, opposite the residence of German Chancellor Otto von Bismarck. A wealthy art collector, his palace contained many art treasures. Charles was also a collector of rare weaponry, and acquired and preserved knives, swords, daggers, rifles, pistols, and revolvers from many different countries and time periods.

As a result of his vast collection, one source stated his palace was "one of the most famous repositories of bric-a-brac in Europe...his collection of arms and armor is believed to know no rival save in the great State armories at Turin and Vienna".

== Death ==
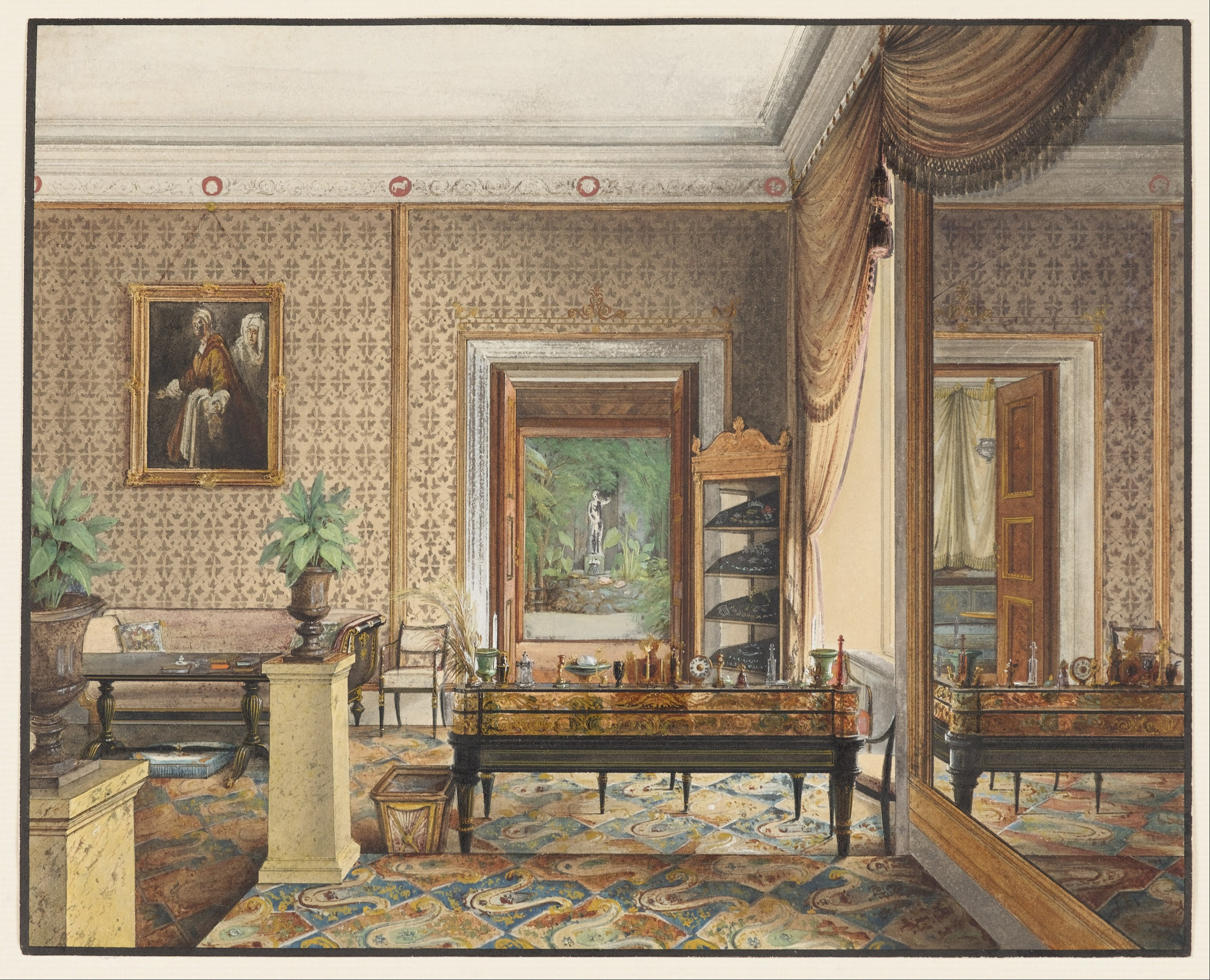
The Study of Prince Charles by Eduard Gaertner.

Marie died on 21 January 1877, only five months before what would have been the golden jubilee of their wedding. Although they had married for family and dynastic reasons, their marriage had been happy and harmonious, and they had been deeply attached to each other.

After her death, Charles aged rapidly, and gradually grew infirm from ailments typical of advancing age. In 1882, his foot slipped while he was getting up from the dinner table, causing him to fall down heavily and fracture his left thighbone. The fall and fracture accentuated his ailments, and it was reported that survival was unlikely.

He died in Berlin a few months later, on 21 January 1883, aged 81. His last words were "Long live the Emperor."

At the time of his death, Charles was the only surviving brother of Emperor Wilhelm I. His death disrupted plans for the celebration of the silver wedding anniversary of his nephew, Crown Prince Frederick William, as well as plans for a visit from the Prince and Princess of Wales to Berlin.

His body was buried, alongside his wife Marie, in Ss. Peter and Paul Church on Nikolskoë near Glienicke Palace, Potsdam, Berlin, Germany.

== Ancestry ==
Ancestors of Prince Charles of Prussia

8. Prince Augustus William of Prussia
4. Frederick William II of Prussia
9. Duchess Luise of Brunswick-Wolfenbüttel
2. Frederick William III of Prussia
10. Louis IX, Landgrave of Hesse-Darmstadt
5. Princess Frederica Louisa of Hesse-Darmstadt
11. Countess Palatine Caroline of Zweibrücken
1. Prince Charles of Prussia
12. Duke Charles Louis Frederick of Mecklenburg-Strelitz
6. Charles II, Grand Duke of Mecklenburg-Strelitz
13. Princess Elisabeth Albertine of Saxe-Hildburghausen
3. Duchess Louise of Mecklenburg-Strelitz
14. Prince George William of Hesse-Darmstadt
7. Princess Friederike of Hesse-Darmstadt
15. Countess Maria Louise Albertine of Leiningen-Dagsburg-Falkenburg

== Honours ==
He received the following decorations and awards:

German honours

- Prussia:
  - Knight of the Black Eagle, 29 June 1811; with Collar, 1841
  - Grand Commander's Cross of the House Order of Hohenzollern, 1851; with Star, 17 March 1863; with Swords, 1873
  - Master of Knights of the Johanniter Order, 1853
  - Grand Cross of the Red Eagle, with Oak Leaves, 18 October 1861; with Swords, 1864
  - Knight of the Crown Order, 1st Class, 18 October 1861
  - Iron Cross (1870), 1st Class
  - Pour le Mérite (military), 28 July 1866
  - Service Award Cross
- Ascanian duchies: Grand Cross of the Order of Albert the Bear, 16 December 1839; with Swords, 18 November 1864
- Bavaria:
  - Knight of St. Hubert, 1853
  - Grand Cross of the Military Merit Order
- Brunswick: Grand Cross of the Order of Henry the Lion
- Baden:
  - Knight of the House Order of Fidelity, 1847
  - Grand Cross of the Zähringer Lion, 1847
  - Grand Cross of the Military Karl-Friedrich Merit Order, 1871
- (Saxe-Coburg and Gotha) (Duchy of Saxe-Altenburg) (Saxe-Meiningen) Ernestine duchies: Grand Cross of the Saxe-Ernestine House Order, January 1850; with Swords
- Hanover:
  - Grand Cross of the Royal Guelphic Order, 1835
  - Knight of St. George, 1839
- Hesse-Kassel: Grand Cross of the Golden Lion, 5 September 1841
- Hesse-Darmstadt:
  - Grand Cross of the Ludwig Order, 29 June 1851
  - Military Merit Cross for 1870-71, 16 March 1871
- Hohenzollern: Cross of Honour of the Princely House Order of Hohenzollern, 1st Class with Swords
- Mecklenburg:
  - Grand Cross of the Wendish Crown, with Crown in Ore
  - Military Merit Cross, 1st Class (Schwerin)
  - Cross for Distinction in War (Strelitz)
- Oldenburg: Grand Cross of the Order of Duke Peter Friedrich Ludwig, with Golden Crown and Collar, 16 May 1850
- Saxe-Weimar-Eisenach: Grand Cross of the White Falcon, 15 December 1826; with Swords, 1875
- Saxony:
  - Knight of the Rue Crown, 1846
  - Grand Cross of the Order of Merit, with Swords
- Schaumburg-Lippe: Military Merit Medal
- Württemberg:
  - Grand Cross of the Württemberg Crown, 1841
  - Grand Cross of the Military Merit Order, 30 December 1870

Foreign honours

- Austrian Empire:
  - Grand Cross of the Royal Hungarian Order of St. Stephen, 1835
  - Military Merit Cross, with War Decoration
- Belgium: Grand Cordon of the Order of Leopold, 6 May 1853
- Denmark: Knight of the Elephant, 26 May 1853
- French Empire: Grand Cross of the Legion of Honour, August 1867
- Kingdom of Greece: Grand Cross of the Redeemer
- Kingdom of Hawaii: Grand Cross of the Order of Kalākaua, 1881
- Monaco: Grand Cross of St. Charles, 6 April 1869
- Netherlands:
  - Commander of the Military William Order, 25 August 1878
  - Grand Cross of the Netherlands Lion
- Ottoman Empire: Order of Osmanieh, 1st Class in Diamonds
- (Tunisia) Beylik of Tunis: Husainid Family Order, in Diamonds
- Kingdom of Portugal: Grand Cross of the Tower and Sword, with Collar
- Russian Empire:
  - Knight of St. Andrew, 25 June 1820
  - Knight of St. Alexander Nevsky
  - Knight of the White Eagle
  - Knight of St. Anna, 1st Class
  - Knight of St. Stanislaus, 1st Class
  - Knight of St. George, 4th Class, 26 November 1869; 3rd Class, 22 October 1872
  - Knight of St. Vladimir, 1st Class
- Kingdom of Sardinia: Knight of the Annunciation
- (Thailand) Siam: Knight of the Crown of Siam, 1st Class
- Spain: Knight of the Golden Fleece, 5 May 1865
- Sweden-Norway: Knight of the Seraphim, 22 March 1873
- Two Sicilies: Grand Cross of St. Ferdinand and Merit

Prince Charles of Prussia House of Hohenzollern Born: 29 June 1801 Died: 21 January 1883
Preceded by August Ferdinand, Prinz von Preußen	Herrenmeister (Grand Master) of the Order of Saint John; 1853–1883	Succeeded by Albrecht, Prinz von Preußen
