= Rakovice =

Rakovice may refer to places:

- Rakovice, Piešťany District, a municipality and village in Slovakia
- Rakovice (Písek District), a municipality and village in the Czech Republic
