= Marie of Prussia (disambiguation) =

Marie of Prussia may refer to:

- Marie of Prussia (1579–1649), daughter of Duke Albrecht Friedrich of Prussia and the wife of Margrave Christian of Brandenburg-Bayreuth
- Marie of Prussia, daughter of Prince Wilhelm of Prussia and wife of King Maximilian II of Bavaria
- Princess Marie of Prussia (1855–1888), daughter of Prince Frederick Charles of Prussia; wife of Prince Henry of the Netherlands and Prince Albert of Saxe-Altenburg
