= Princess Olga of Saxe-Altenburg =

German noblewoman (1886–1955)

Princess Olga
- Countess Carl Friedrich von Pückler-Burghauss
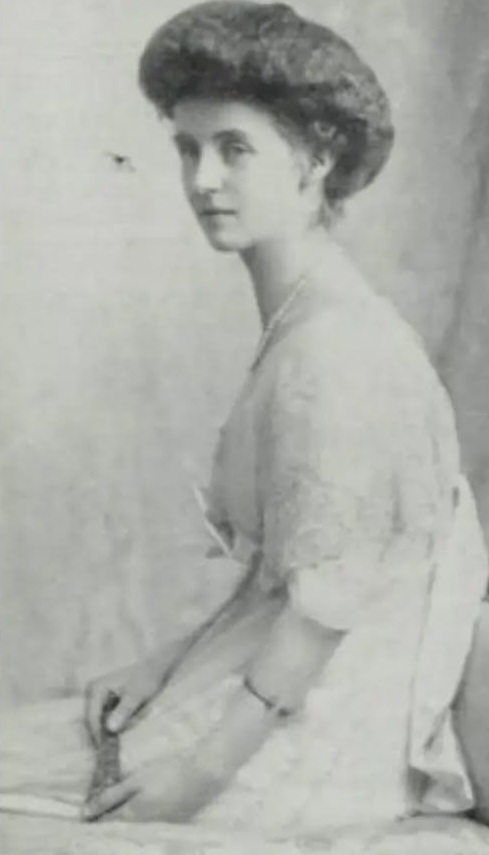
- Olga in 1911
- Born: 17 April 1886; Dresden, Kingdom of Saxony
- Died: 13 January 1955 (aged 68); Münster, West Germany
- Spouse: Carl Friedrich von Pückler-Burghauss (m. 1913; died 1945)
- Issue: Countess Ella-Viola; Countess Eleonore-Renata; Count Karl Rüdiger
Names
- Olga Elisabeth Carola Victoria Maria Anna Agnes Antoinette
- House: House of Saxe-Altenburg
- Father: Prince Albert of Saxe-Altenburg
- Mother: Princess Marie of Prussia
- Religion: Lutheranism

Princess Olga of Saxe-Altenburg (German: Prinzessin Olga von Sachsen-Altenburg und Herzogin von Sachsen; 17 April 1886 – 13 January 1955) was a German noblewoman and a member of the Ducal House of Saxe-Altenburg.

== Early life ==
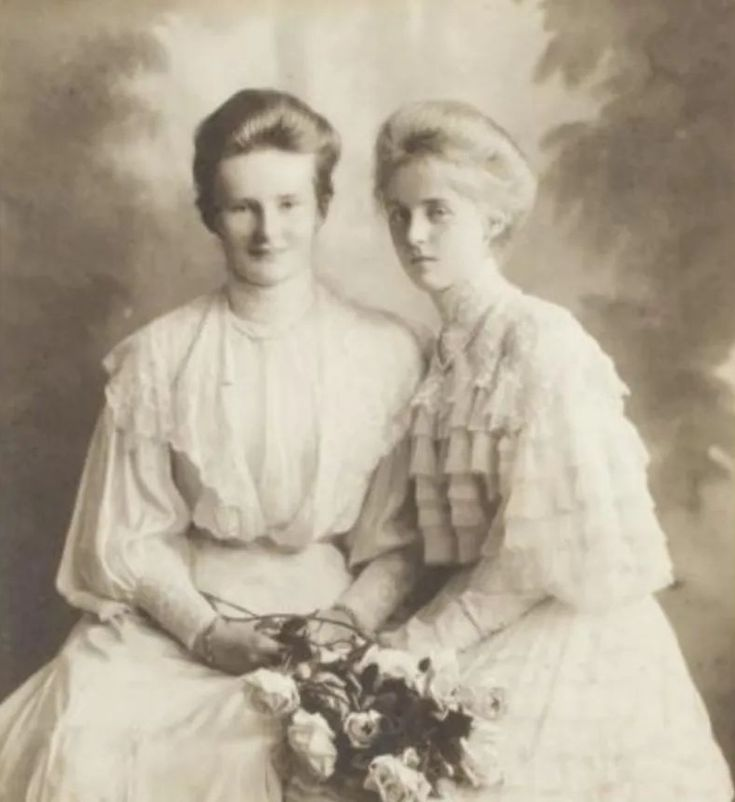
Olga with her little sister Marie, 1904.

Styles of Princess Olga of Saxe-Altenburg
- Reference style: Her Highness
- Spoken style: Your Highness

Born at Albrechtsberg Castle in Dresden, the capital of the Kingdom of Saxony. She was the eldest daughter of Prince Albert of Saxe-Altenburg and his first wife, Princess Marie of Prussia. Through her mother, she was a niece of Princess Louise Margaret of Prussia.

Following the premature death of her mother in 1888, Olga's upbringing was deeply influenced by her father's dual service to the German and Russian empires. She received a private education typical of the high aristocracy, focusing on languages, music, and court etiquette. Due to her father's position as a General in the Imperial Russian Army, part of her education took place in Saint Petersburg, where she became fluent in Russian and French

== Marriage and later life ==
On 20 May 1913, she married Count Carl Friedrich von Pückler-Burghauss in Ludwigsburg. Together, they had three children:

- Countess Ella-Viola (1914–1982); married Andreas Friedrich von Flotow (1913-1990) in 1941 and had issue.
- Countess Eleonore-Renata (1919–1997); married two times and had issue by both
- Count Karl Rüdiger (1923–1923) died when two months old.

After the collapse of the German monarchy and the post-war displacement of the landed aristocracy in 1945, she relocated to Westphalia. She died in Münster on 13 January 1955.

== Ancestry ==
Ancestors of Princess Olga of Saxe-Altenburg

8. Frederick, Duke of Saxe-Altenburg
4. Prince Eduard of Saxe-Altenburg
9. Duchess Charlotte Georgine of Mecklenburg-Strelitz
2. Prince Albert of Saxe-Altenburg
10. Heinrich XIX, Prince Reuss of Greiz
5. Princess Louise Caroline of Reuss-Greiz
11. Princess Gasparine of Rohan-Rochefort
1. Princess Olga of Saxe-Altenburg
12. Prince Charles of Prussia
6. Prince Frederick Charles of Prussia
13. Princess Marie of Saxe-Weimar-Eisenach
3. Princess Marie of Prussia
14. Leopold IV, Duke of Anhalt
7. Princess Maria Anna of Anhalt-Dessau
15. Princess Frederica Wilhelmina of Prussia

== Bibliography ==
- Vogel, Thomas (2005). Die Prinzen von Sachsen-Altenburg. Selle. ISBN 978-3938552001.
- Genealogisches Handbuch des Adels. Vol. 47. C.A. Starke. 1971.
- Gothaischer Hofkalender. Justus Perthes. 1922.
