= Peter Dubovský (bishop) =

Slovak Auxiliary Bishop of the Roman Catholic Diocese of Banská Bystrica

Peter Dubovský S.J.
- Titular Bishop of Carcabia
- Church: Catholic Church
- Diocese: Carcabia
- In office: 12 January 1991 – 10 April 2008
- Predecessor: Jusztin Nándor Takács
- Successor: Dimitri Salachas
- Previous post: Auxiliary Bishop of Banská Bystrica (1991-1997)

Orders
- Ordination: 24 December 1950
- Consecration: 18 May 1961 by Dominik Kalata

Personal details
- Born: 28 June 1921 Rakovice, Czechoslovakia
- Died: 10 April 2008 (aged 86) Ivanka pri Dunaji, Slovakia

Peter Dubovský, SJ, (28 June 1921 in Rakovice – 10 April 2008 in Ivanka pri Dunaji) was a Slovak Auxiliary Bishop of the Roman Catholic Diocese of Banská Bystrica from 1991 until his retirement in 1997. Dubovský was ordained as a Catholic priest on December 24, 1950 and clandestinely as bishop on May 18, 1961 by Dominik Kalata, because of the Communist Government of Czechoslovakia and the persecution of the Roman Catholic Church by the government. He died on April 10, 2008, at the age of 86.
