= Prague offensive =

1945 Red Army invasion of German-occupied Czechoslovakia

- Part of the Eastern Front of World War II
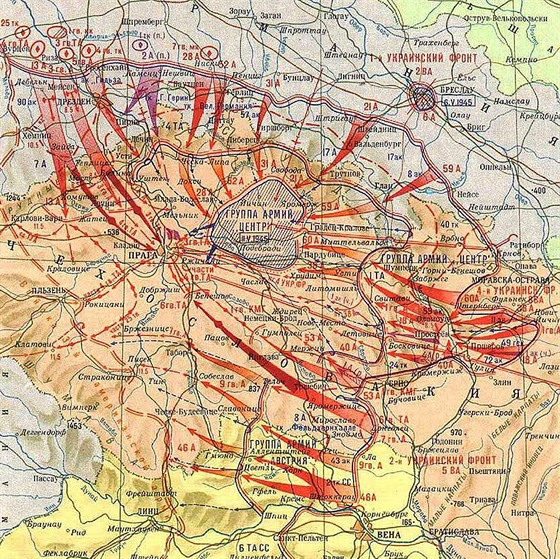
- Map of Prague offensive
| Date | 6–11 May 1945 (5 days) |
| Location | Prague, Czechoslovakia |
| Result | Allied victory; End of World War II in Europe |

Belligerents
| Axis: Germany; Hungary; Slovakia: POHG | Allies: Soviet Union; Romania; Czechoslovakia; Poland Russian Liberation Army |

Commanders and leaders
| Ferdinand Schörner; Lothar Rendulic; Friedrich Altrichter (surrendered); Kurt Agricola (surrendered); Carl Friedrich von Pückler-Burghauss | Ivan Konev; Rodion Malinovsky; Andrey Yeryomenko; Karel Klapálek; Vasile Atanasiu; Nicolae Dăscălescu; Karol Świerczewski Sergei Bunyachenko |

Strength
| Army Group Centre: 600,000–650,000; Army Group Ostmark: 430,000; 9,370 | 1,770,700; 139,500; 69,500; 48,400 18,000 |

Casualties and losses
| Some 860,000 captured; remainder killed, missing in action, or fled | 49,348; 1,730; 887; 533 (Note: Czech losses do not include those of the Prague uprising or of partisan formations.) 300 |

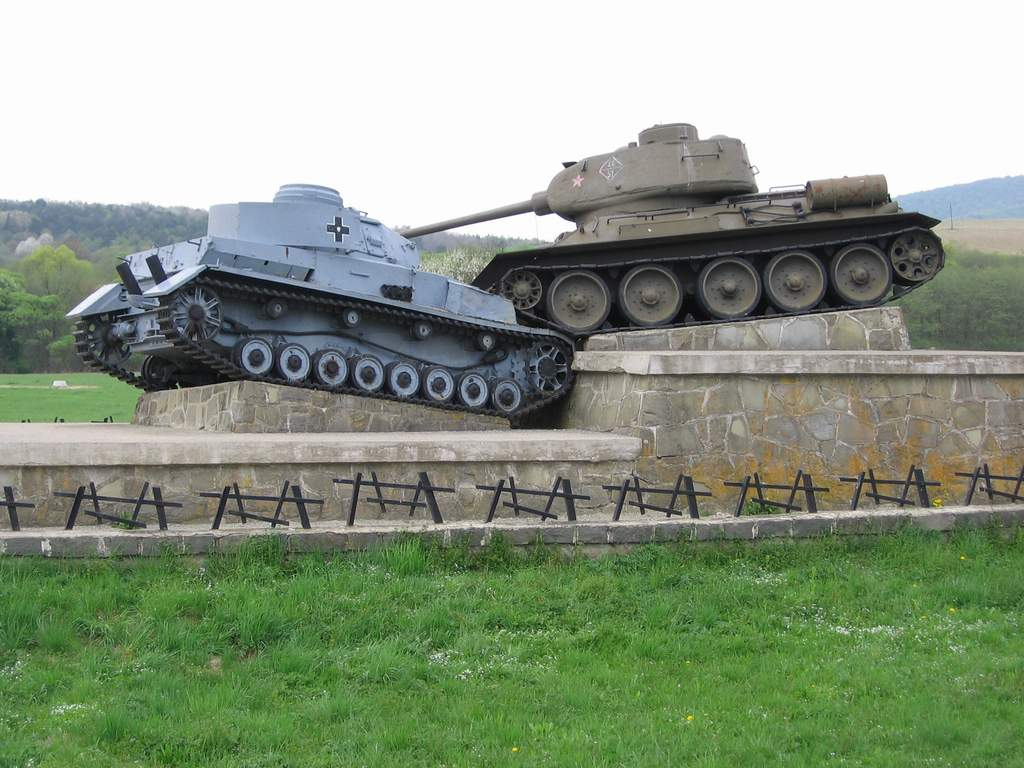
Battle of the Dukla Pass monument

The Prague offensive (Russian: Пражская стратегическая наступательная операция, romanized: Prazhskaya strategicheskaya nastupatel'naya operatsiya, lit. 'Prague Strategic Offensive Operation') was the last major military operation of World War II in Europe. The offensive was fought on the Eastern Front from 6 May to 11 May 1945. Fought concurrently with the Prague uprising, the offensive significantly helped the liberation of Czechoslovakia in 1945. The offensive was one of the last engagements of World War II in Europe and continued after Nazi Germany's unconditional capitulation on 8/9 May.

The city of Prague was ultimately liberated by the USSR during the Prague offensive. All of the German troops of Army Group Centre (Heeresgruppe Mitte) and many of Army Group Ostmark (formerly known as Army Group South) were killed or captured, or fell into the hands of the Allies after the capitulation. (Note: Under the laws of war at that time there was a distinction between those captured and those who "[fell] into the power" of the enemy after a mass capitulation. The 1929 Geneva Convention only covered those who were captured during the fighting not those who fell into the power of an enemy following a mass capitulation (See Disarmed Enemy Forces). This was explicitly changed in the Third Geneva Convention (1949))

== Background ==
=== Political and military developments ===
By the beginning of May 1945, Germany had been decisively defeated by the coalition of the Western Allies and the Soviet Union. Germany's capital, Berlin, was on the verge of capitulation in the face of a massive Soviet attack and the great bulk of Germany had been conquered.

However, in southeastern Germany, parts of Austria and Czechoslovakia, there were still large bodies of active German troops of Army Group Centre and the remnants of Army Group Ostmark. On 2 May 1945, Generaloberst Alfred Jodl, Chief of Staff of Oberkommando der Wehrmacht, ordered the German forces to avoid being captured by Russia and facilitate separate negotiation with Western Allies. The German remnant forces continued to resist the USSR 4th and 1st Ukrainian Fronts while only accepting an armistice on the Western Front.

The Nazi regime considered Czechoslovakia and neighboring areas as their last bastion in the event that Berlin fell. Therefore, in 1945 they concentrated many powerful military units in the region, including elements of 6th SS Panzer Army, 1st and 4th Panzer Armies, and 7th, 8th and 17th Combined Armies. Jodl had ordered the local Nazi regime to prepare numerous fortified buildings which could serve as offices for the new Nazi government and German High Command.

From 30 April to 1 May 1945, SS Senior Group Leader (Obergruppenführer) and General of Police Karl Hermann Frank announced over the radio in Prague that he would drown any uprising in a "sea of blood". Frank was also a general of the Waffen-SS. The situation in Prague was unstable. Frank knew that several Soviet Army fronts were advancing towards Prague. More immediately, he was faced with a city population ready to be liberated.

At the same time, two divisions of the Russian Liberation Army (KONR) arrived in the vicinity of Prague. The KONR 1st Division encamped north of the city while the KONR 2nd Division took up positions south of the city. Ostensibly allied with the Germans, the allegiance of the KONR forces would prove to vary depending on the situation they faced. Meanwhile the allies agreed a new demarcation line in southwest Czechoslovakia, the previous line agreed at Yalta had been on the border.

On the Allied side, both Winston Churchill and Joseph Stalin saw Prague as a particularly important prize, the capture of which could significantly influence the political makeup of postwar Czechoslovakia. On 1 May 1945, before Berlin was subdued, Stalin issued orders directing the 1st Belorussian Front to relieve the 1st Ukrainian Front in the Berlin area so that the latter could regroup to the south along the Mulde River and drive on Prague. The 2nd Ukrainian Front also received orders on 2 May to drive on Prague from the southeast. Stalin was determined to have the Soviet Army present in force in western Czechoslovakia when the German troops there finally surrendered.

=== Terrain ===
The terrain over which the Soviets had to advance was varied, but mostly mountainous and forested. The routes of march of the 1st and 4th Ukrainian Fronts were perpendicular to the orientation of the ridges while the 2nd Ukrainian Front was able to move along a less arduous route in regions of lower elevation that led to Prague. In particular, the 1st Ukrainian Front had to cross the Ore Mountains to advance on Prague from the area north of Dresden and Bautzen. The other significant military terrain obstacle was urban areas, the two largest of which to surmount were Dresden and Prague itself.

=== Deployment ===
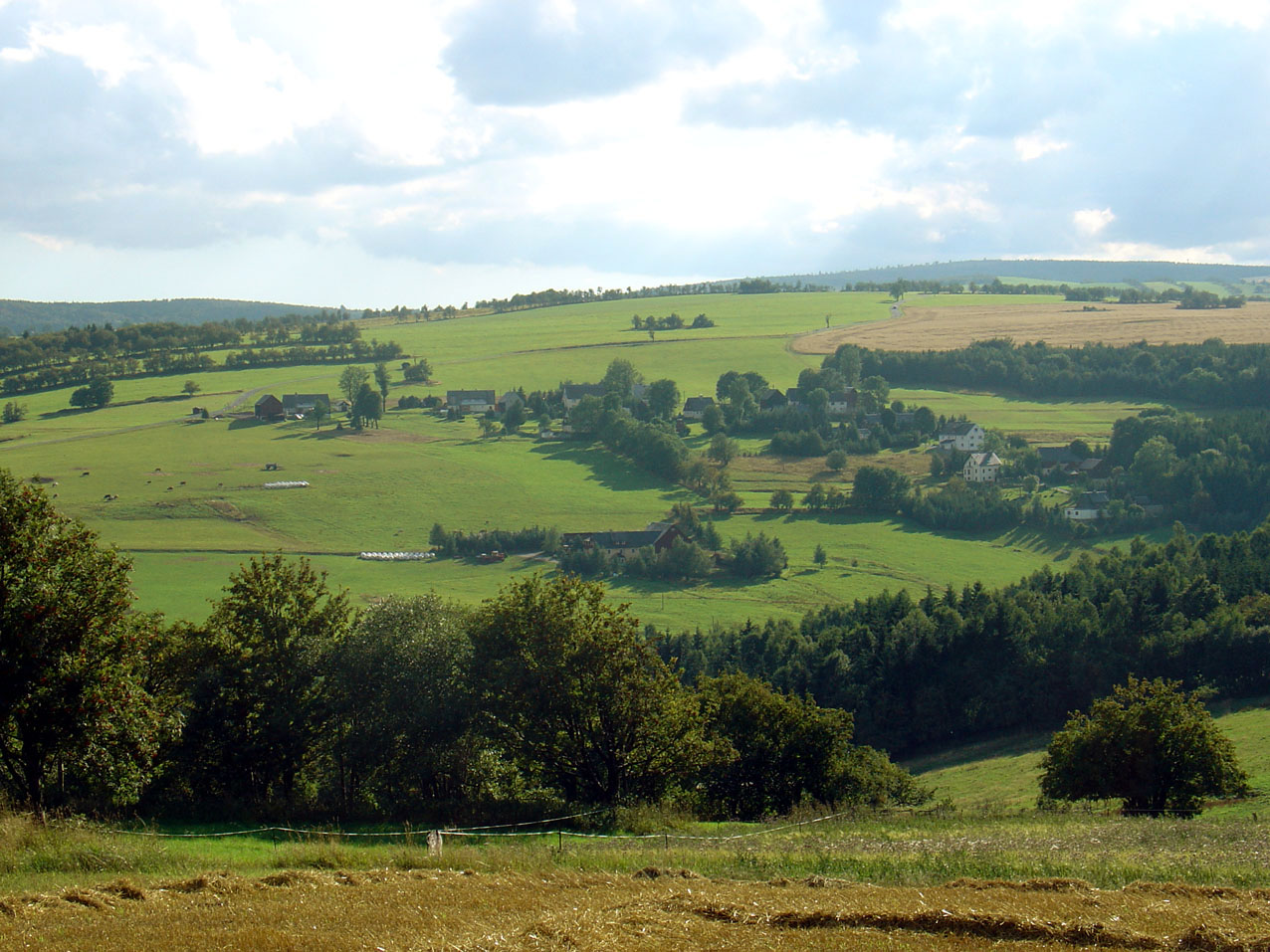
Rolling terrain of the Ore Mountains

Positions of armies on 6 May 1945; Soviet forces in red, German in gray, and United States in green

With Soviet and U.S. forces pressing in from all sides, Army Group Centre's deployment resembled a horseshoe straddling the historical regions of Bohemia and Moravia. To the west, the 7th Army (formerly part of Army Group G) had been pushed east by operations of the U.S. Sixth Army Group and had become a subordinate command of Army Group Centre. 7th Army was deployed roughly along a north–south axis in western Czechoslovakia. Besides one Panzer division and one Volksgrenadier division, 7th Army had only four other "divisions", two of which were named battle groups (Schulze and Benicke) while the remaining two were replacement army formations mobilized for combat and filled out with military school staffs and trainees.

To the northeast of Prague and just north of Dresden and Bautzen, the 4th Panzer Army defended along a front running slightly southeast. 4th Panzer Army had five Panzer or mechanized divisions, as well as 13 other divisions or battle groups. Furthermore, 4th Panzer Army had just won the Battle of Bautzen, damaging the Soviet 52nd and Polish 2nd Armies.

To 4th Panzer Army's right (eastern) flank was 17th Army. The 17th counted 11 divisions, including one Panzer and one motorized division. These were organized into three corps and deployed in an arc that began about 40 kilometers SW of Breslau and which led to the southeast in the vicinity of Ostrava.

From here the front ran southeast to Olomouc, where the 1st Panzer Army was deployed, including a salient that jutted eastward around Olomouc. 1st Panzer Army was outsized with six Panzer or motorized divisions in addition to 19 others organized into five corps; five divisions were directly under control of the army headquarters.

In southern Moravia, Army Group Ostmark's 8th Army was deployed on a front leading to the southwest into Austria where its right flank met up with the 6th SS Panzer Army in the area north and west of Vienna. 8th Army could call on a Panzer division and a motorized division, as well as six other divisions.

Facing part of the German 1st Panzer and 8th Armies in the region of Brno, the Soviet 2nd Ukrainian Front numbered 37 rifle divisions, six cavalry divisions, and four tank or mechanized corps. The 2nd Ukrainian Front was expected to advance northwest over the less mountainous country to Prague and would lead its advance with the 6th Guards Tank Army. Allied forces with 2nd Ukrainian Front were the 1st and 4th Romanian Armies, totaling 12 infantry divisions and three cavalry divisions.

Confronting primarily the 1st Panzer Army, the 4th Ukrainian Front commanded 34 rifle divisions and one tank corps. 4th Ukrainian Front faced the obstacles of Olomouc, a small city, and multiple hill ranges which cut across the projected line of advance. Unlike 2nd Ukrainian Front, the 4th lacked direct and major road connections from Olomouc to Prague, a factor almost guaranteed to slow its rate of advance. Allied forces with 4th Ukrainian Front included the Czechoslovak Army Corps of four infantry and one tank brigades.

From the region north of Dresden and Görlitz over a large arc to the area of Breslau, the 1st Ukrainian Front counted 71 rifle divisions and three cavalry divisions, as well as nine tank and mechanized corps. The bulk of 1st Ukrainian Front's forces were massed north of Dresden for a direct advance on Prague and included the 3rd and 4th Guards Tank Armies. The primary opponent of this thrust would be the 4th Panzer Army. To the east, five combined-arms armies and the Polish 2nd Army made up the left (eastern) wing of the front, the advance of which would pressure mainly the German 17th Army. Facing the main 1st Ukrainian Front advance were the Ore Mountains, as well as the urban areas of Dresden and Bautzen.

The main axes of late-war Soviet offensives were marked on the one hand by tank armies and by the presence of Reserve of the Supreme High Command (Stavka Reserve) artillery divisions on the other. In May 1945, the 1st Ukrainian Front counted six artillery divisions and one rocket launcher division (as well as one Polish artillery division), the 4th Ukrainian Front had two artillery divisions, and the 2nd Ukrainian Front commanded four artillery divisions and one rocket launcher division.

Facing the German 7th Army to the west were the U.S. VIII Corps (of the 9th Army), (Note: VIII Corps was subordinated to 1st Army until 6 May 1945. Anticipating a combat role for 1st Army Headquarters in the Pacific Theater of Operations, the 1st Army relinquished control of its subordinate commands in the first week of May 1945. These commands were in turn subordinated to the 9th Army. See Williams' Chronology (1989), pp. 530 and 533.) V Corps, and XII Corps (both of the 3rd Army). VIII Corps numbered one armored and three infantry divisions (Note: 6th Armored Division, and 76th, 87th, and 89th Infantry Divisions (Greenwald 1945, 6th Armored Division; 76th Infantry Division; 87th Infantry Division; 89th Infantry Division).) while V Corps was made up of one armored division and two infantry divisions. (Note: 1st and 2nd Infantry Divisions, and 9th Armored Division (Greenwald 1945, 1st Infantry Division; 2nd Infantry Division; 9th Armored Division).) An additional infantry division under control of 3rd Army Headquarters was also in V Corps' sector, (Note: 97th Infantry Division (Greenwald 1945, 97th Infantry Division).) and a second armored division would be subordinated to V Corps before VE Day. (Note: 16th Armored Division (Greenwald 1945, 16th Armored Division).) XII Corps commanded two armored divisions and two infantry divisions. (Note: 4th and 11th Armored Divisions, and 26th and 90th Infantry Divisions (Greenwald 1945, 4th Armored Division; 11th Armored Division; 26th Infantry Division 90th Infantry Division).) Exerting some pressure on German 7th Army, these corps of the U.S. Army did not advance on Prague although their presence in western Bohemia stimulated Czech resistance to the German occupation, indirectly influencing the Prague uprising. By agreement with the Soviets, the U.S. forces did not advance in strength eastward of an irregular demarcation line that at points touched Leipzig, Karlovy Vary, and Plzen.

Realizing that the Soviets would attack Army Group Centre following the surrender of Berlin, on 5 May Field Marshal Schörner devised a plan (Blumen-Operation) in which the units of Army Group Centre would attempt a fighting withdrawal to the west where they would be in a position to surrender to U.S. forces versus those of the Soviet Union. Schörner envisioned withdrawal phase lines (given the names of flowers) and intended for the 4th Panzer Army to hold off the 1st Ukrainian Front long enough for the other field armies of the army group to fall back to the west.

== Prague uprising ==
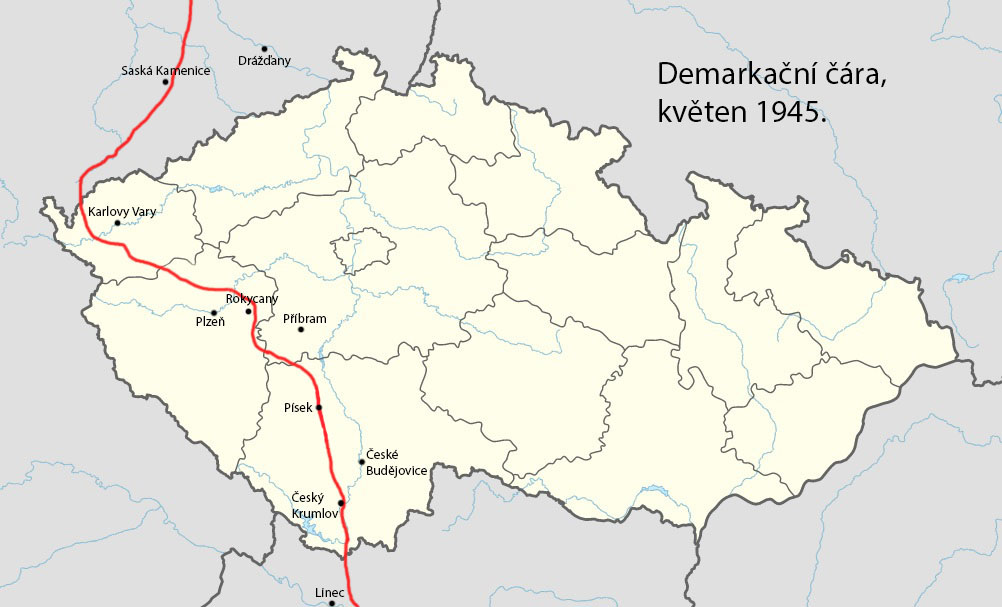
Demarcation line between the Soviet and American armies, May 1945

The orders from Stalin on 1 May to the three fronts called for the offensive to commence on 7 May. On 4 May, Marshal Konev provided detailed orders to his army commanders for three thrusts by the 1st Ukrainian Front. A main thrust would occur on the right (western) wing with three combined-arms armies, two tank armies (3rd and 4th Guards Tank Armies) and five artillery divisions, following the valleys of the Elbe and Vltava Rivers. A secondary thrust by the 28th and 52nd Armies was to advance on an axis from Zittau to Prague, and a final thrust by the Polish 2nd Army was to cut off the southeastern approaches to Dresden. Dresden itself was to be taken by the 5th Guards Army as part of the main thrust.

Suggesting to General Antonov that a U.S. advance to Prague was now feasible, General Eisenhower was informed that such was not desired by the Soviets. During the meeting with Marshal Ivan Konev on 5 May, General Omar Bradley also proposed the same offer. However, Marshal Konev – while he appreciated the good will of the American commander – refused the offer because Bradley's proposal violated the previously agreed borderline between the areas to be liberated by Soviet and Anglo-American forces; therefore, Konev had no authority to accept it. Konev also promised that the USSR alone would destroy local German forces as soon as possible.

At that point, events external to formal military planning erupted. By 5 May, the lead units of the U.S. V Corps had reached Plzen, with word of the American advance reaching the residents of Prague and playing a part in the decision of the city's Czech citizens to rise up against the German occupation.

The uprising in Prague came into immediate conflict with the German occupation forces. Fighting in desperate circumstances, the Czechs gained control of a radio station and, besides calling on Czechs to join the uprising, also broadcast on 5 May an appeal in Russian and English for air support to hold off German armored units. These developments prompted Stalin to hasten the start of the Soviet offensive and it was ordered to commence one day earlier, on 6 May.

Adding to the confusion in Prague but providing useful assistance to the Czechs, the 1st Division of the Russian Liberation Army (ROA) under General Bunyachenko moved into Prague and engaged in combat with their erstwhile German allies. By 7 May, the 1st Division had occupied the airport and the radio station. The Czech National Council however denounced the ROA. The Soviet government labelled all ROA soldiers as traitors, and their members were sentenced to detention in prison camps.

On the morning of May 9, the first Soviet tanks arrived in Prague, the first tanks of the 1st Czechoslovak Tank Brigade arrived in the city on May 10. By May 11, the troops were clearing the area of hidden remaining German troops.

== Battle ==
The Soviet offensive commenced on 6 May and concluded on 11 May.

=== 6 May ===
Konev's 1st Ukrainian Front opened the Prague Offensive with an attack by the 3rd and 4th Guard Tank Armies and the 13th, 3rd Guards, and 5th Guards combined-arms armies. This group of five armies was Konev's main attack and pushed south from the area around Riesa. Facing Konev's thrust were troops of the German 4th Panzer Army. The attack opened with a reconnaissance-in-force in the morning, followed by a brief but powerful artillery barrage. 13th, 3rd Guards, and both tank armies (as well as two other tank corps) attacked southward in the afternoon, with the 13th Army and the 4th Guards Tank Army pushing forward some 23 kilometers. By evening, 5th Guards Army had joined the attack with the objective of capturing Dresden.

Ending a separate 1st Ukrainian Front operation, 40,000 German troops in Breslau surrendered to the Soviet 6th Army after a two-month-long siege. On 6 May, 4th Ukrainian Front attacked to the west, intent upon capturing the city of Olomouc. Defending against the Soviet attack in front of Olomouc was the 1st Panzer Army.

In the west, the U.S. V and XII Corps attacked into western Czechoslovakia against the defenses of the German 7th Army. Elements of the 16th Armored Division captured Plzen while a combat command of the 4th Armored Division captured Strakonice. In all, the two corps advanced into Czechoslovakia with a strength of seven divisions. To the north, the U.S. VIII Corps was subordinated to the U.S. Ninth Army.

=== 7 May ===
Continuing the main attack of the 1st Ukrainian Front, 3rd Guards Army captured Meissen, home of the famous German porcelain. The 13th Army and the 4th Guards Tank Army pushed 45 kilometers further to the south and reached the northern slope of the Ore Mountains. The 3rd Guards Tank Army and 5th Guards Army began the battle to capture Dresden. The 2nd Polish Army thrust to the southwest in support of the operations against Dresden. Farther to the east, the second attack of the front developed as the 28th and 52nd Armies attacked to the south.

Following a 30-minute artillery barrage, the 7th Guards Army and the 6th Guards Tank Army led an attack to the northwest, opening the offensive of the 2nd Ukrainian Front. Adding to the difficulties of the defending German 8th Army, the Soviet 9th Guards Army and 46th Army reinforced the attack on its left (southern) wing. By the end of the day, the front had pushed 12 kilometers into the German lines along an advance 25 kilometers in breadth. Between the 2nd and 1st Ukrainian Fronts, the 4th Ukrainian Front continued its advance on Olomouc.

In Prague, German troops reached the Old Town Square, one of the centers of uprising, but later were pushed back. The buildings of Town Hall, despite being severely damaged, remained in the hands of insurgents for the duration of the uprising. The overwhelming pressure on the uprising and the civilian population continued.

On 7 May, Jodl signed the surrender of all German forces at SHAEF. The surrender was to become effective at 2301 hours (11:01 p. m.) on 8 May. In western Czechoslovakia, upon receipt of the news of the surrender, U.S. forces ceased offensive operations and assumed a defensive posture. U.S. V Corps took Karlovy Vary on the day of the surrender.

=== 8 May ===
OKW had last heard from Schörner on 2 May when he reported his intention to fight his way west and surrender his army group to the Americans. On 8 May Colonel Wilhelm Meyer-Detring, (Note: Wilhelm Meyer-Detring, 1906-2002, later became a lieutenant-general and commander of the I Corps in the Bundeswehr, retiring from military service in 1966.) a German liaison officer from OKW, was escorted through the American lines to see Schörner. Meyer-Detring told Schörner that the formal capitulation of Germany meant that any withdrawal as a large formation by troops of Army Group Centre was out of the question, and that the German troops should attempt to make their way west and surrender to U.S. forces. Schörner was skeptical that such was possible. On his return Meyer-Detring reported that Schörner had ordered his operational command to observe the surrender but could not guarantee he would be obeyed everywhere. (Note: Like many institutions in Nazi Germany the control of the Army was split between different chains of command that reported directly to Hitler. In 1945 the German Armed Forces High Command (OKW) commanded all German forces in every theatre apart from those on the Eastern Front which were under the control of Oberkommando des Heeres ("German Army High Command") (OKH) and which, before his suicide, had both reported directly to Hitler. So it was not clear if Schörner was under the command of OKW on 8 May or if President Karl Dönitz or Chancellor von Krosigk needed to order Schörner, to surrender his army group.)

Pushing forward another 40 kilometers, the main thrust of the 1st Ukrainian Front broke through German resistance in the Ore Mountains and approached to within 70-80 kilometers of Prague. The advance of the 4th Guards Tank Army came upon the headquarters of Army Group Centre, capturing or killing the headquarters personnel, but not Schörner, who, deserting his command, made his way to Podbořany, from where he flew to Bavaria the next day in civilian clothes. Nine days later, he was detained in Austria by German troops who handed him over to the Americans.

By the evening of 8 May, Dresden fell to 3rd Guards Tank Army and the 5th Guards Army. On the same day, the 4th Ukrainian Front pushed the Germans out of Olomouc. The Soviets broadcast a demand that the remaining German forces in the field were to lay down their arms by 23:00 hours that day. No reply was received. Without a functioning army group headquarters and leaderless, the component armies of Army Group Centre had been left to their own devices. Schörner's plans for an orderly withdrawal notwithstanding, the bulk of Army Group Centre's troops were destined to be captured by the Soviet Army.

The Czech National Council (ČNR), lacking significant supplies to support the uprising, fearing large-scale destruction of Prague, and in the wake of the overall German surrender, came to an agreement with the Germans in which the German troops were to leave Prague under conditions of ceasefire. Some SS units, however, continued their attacks against the Czech insurgents in Prague. The 1st KONR Division, its relations with the ČNR broken down and realizing no quarter could be expected from Soviet forces, joined the SS and other German troops in a wary alliance of convenience and started moving west. The KONR 2nd Division had already contacted the Americans and started the march west.

=== 9 May ===
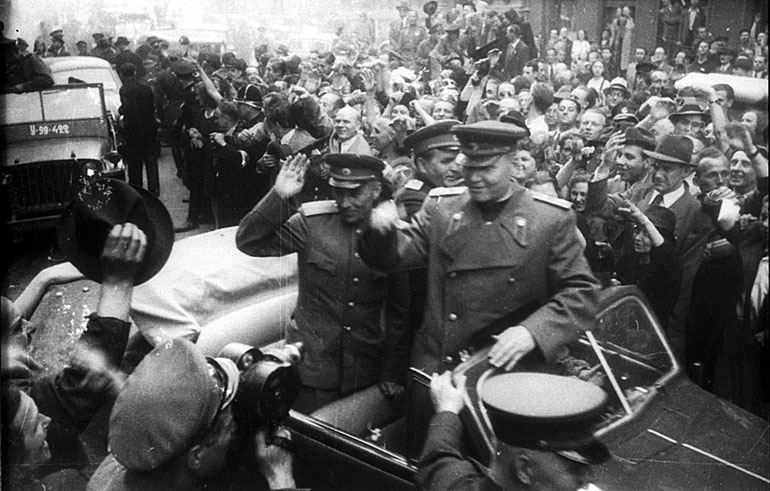
Marshal Konev hailed as the Soviets enter Prague, 9 May 1945

During the night of 8/9 May, armored units of the 3rd and 4th Guards Tank Armies pushed south some 80 kilometers, entering Prague at daybreak. The armored vanguards were shortly followed by elements of the 13th Army and 3rd Guards Army. With the help of the Czech population, Prague was freed of German troops around 10:00 hours. The Red Army casualties were only ten men killed, in what was described as their "easiest victory" of the war. In any event, German troops in and around Prague were anxious to flee to the west, although Soviet columns, Czech partisans, and an angry Czech populace made the journey to U.S. lines anything but certain.

In the late hours of the day (after midnight), units from 4th and 2nd Ukrainian Fronts also reached Prague, including the armored brigade of the Czechoslovak Army Corps. The arrival of the other fronts meant the bulk of Army Group Centre was cut off and forced into a pocket to the east, northeast, and south of Prague.

=== 10–11 May ===
With Soviet units in Prague and pushing further west and south into Bohemia, the Soviet military objectives of the offensive had been met. The bulk of German troops in Army Group Centre were taken prisoner by the Soviets in the two days following the liberation of Prague, while elements of the 1st and 2nd Ukrainian Fronts pushed west to the Chemnitz-Karlovy Vary-Plzen demarcation line with U.S. forces.

Fearing their treatment at the hands of the locals or Soviet Army troops, remnant formations of Army Group Centre continued their resistance until 10/11 May, and in the cases of some small units, later into May 1945. The left flank of the 2nd Ukrainian Front met with troops of the U.S. Third Army (George Patton) in the regions of České Budějovice and Písek. Later, 1st and 2nd Ukrainian Fronts met with Americans in the regions of Karlovy Vary and Klatovy. With these unit movements, the Prague Offensive concluded three days after Victory in Europe Day.

German soldiers, ethnic German civilians, and ethnic Czech collaborators fleeing Prague were surprised by the advancing Soviets and were completely routed. The Czech partisans resumed hostilities against the fleeing German troops regardless of their intentions or nationality, in what the veterans of the 20th Waffen Grenadier Division of the SS (1st Estonian) who had laid their weapons down in May 1945 recalled as the Czech Hell.

The last shots were fired close to the Slivice settlement, 4 kilometers southeast of the town of Příbram during the Battle of Slivice.

== Aftermath ==
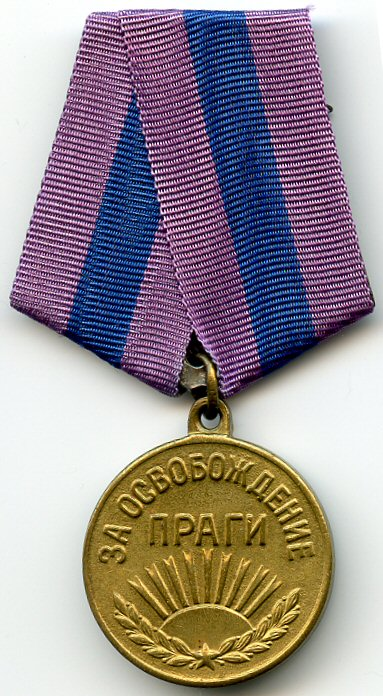
To honor the participants of the operation, the Soviet Union instituted the Medal "For the Liberation of Prague".

=== Military and political considerations ===
The Prague Offensive destroyed Army Group Centre and parts of Army Group Ostmark. These army groups were the last large intact military formations of Germany, and following the offensive, all surviving German soldiers became prisoners of war or fugitives.

The number of German prisoners taken by the Soviet Union reached almost 900,000 and other Axis soldiers, numbering at least in the tens of thousands, surrendered to U.S. forces in western Czechoslovakia and Austria, although numbers of these were later turned over to the Soviet Union.

Czechoslovakia was free of the German occupation regime for the first time since late 1938. The country's prewar borders, however, would not be completely restored as the Soviets engineered the cession of Carpathian Ruthenia to the USSR in July 1945.

Western Czechoslovakia was split by a military frontier of superpowers, on one side of which was the Soviet Army and on the other side of which was the U.S. Army. Although both armies would depart Czechoslovakia by the end of 1945, Stalin had achieved his goal of ensuring a strong Soviet military presence in Prague at the time of the surrender of German forces in Czechoslovakia.

Communist influence in the postwar Czechoslovak Army and government mounted. Czech soldiers who had fought with the Western Allies found themselves increasingly on the sidelines, and the country itself was forced to become a Soviet satellite state in 1948 by a communist coup.

=== Immediate deaths of prominent figures ===
Even before the start of the Soviet offensive, on 5 May, Emanuel Moravec died of suicide. Moravec, known as the "Czech Quisling," was infamous among the Czechs as a traitor.

SS-Obergruppenführer und Reichstatthalter Konrad Henlein, the former Czechoslovak politician and the leader of the Nazi Party of Sudeten Germans, died of suicide in American captivity on 10 May.

On 12 May, SS-Gruppenführer und Generalleutnant der Waffen-SS Count Pückler-Burghauss, commander of Waffen-SS in the Protectorate, died of suicide after he signed the capitulation.

On 14 May, Dr. Emil Hácha, the State President of the Protectorate of Bohemia and Moravia, was arrested in Prague. He was brutally beaten by the NKVD and transferred to the hospital wing of Pankrác Prison, where he died on 27 June 1945.

=== Historiography of the offensive ===
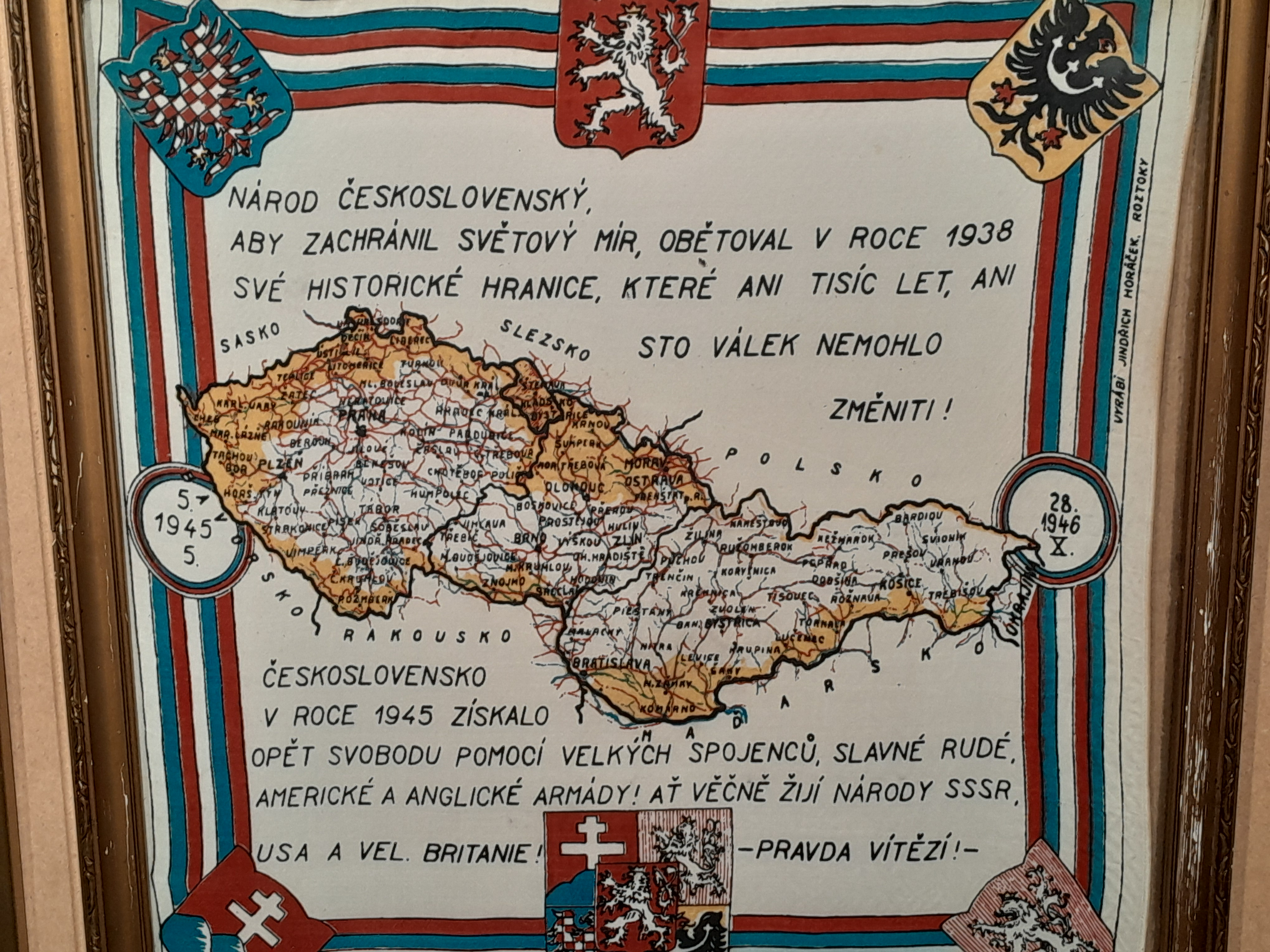
Proclamation of liberation of Czechoslovakia, exhibited in Bratislava Castle

Volume 10 of the Soviet official history of the Second World War treats the Prague Offensive as a primarily military event, identifying the major military formations involved, their axes of advance, and in some cases, their daily rate of advance. Unsurprisingly, the Soviet history praises the operation for the international efforts of Soviet, Polish, Czech, and Romanian soldiers on behalf of "the freedom of the Czechoslovakian People". No mention is made, however, of Stalin's political intentions regarding Czechoslovakia. The final push to Prague during the night of 8–9 May 1945 is presented as having been necessary to relieve struggling Czech insurgents in Prague while the authors could not resist accusing former officers of the prewar Czech Army of abandoning the barricades during combat with the Germans in Prague.

That the offensive was a military event involving serious combat is made clear by the over 50,000 casualties suffered by the Allies from 6 to 11 May 1945. Published in 2008, Volume 10/1 of the German official history of the war criticizes the Soviet view of the event, noting the percentage of casualties of the Prague Offensive to be far lower than that of the Berlin Offensive. (Note: Krivosheev, pp. 158-159, presents force totals and daily casualty figures that confirm the assertion of the German official history. As an example, during the Berlin Operation 1st Ukrainian Front on average suffered the loss of 84.6 men per divisional equivalent per day, while the corresponding figure for the same formation during the Prague Offensive was 45.3. Soviet losses may have declined following the announcement of German surrender on 8/9 May 1945.) The German official history makes note of Stalin's political intentions and his desire to prevent Army Group Centre from surrendering to U.S. forces. Despite titling the relevant section The End of Army Group Centre, the German official history only briefly mentions the situation of the army group in May 1945 and instead discusses other topics. The actual surrender of Army Group Centre is not discussed at all.

There are unofficial histories that touch upon the offensive, or more generally, on the end of the war in Czechoslovakia. Somewhere between the official German and Soviet views, John Erickson's The Road to Berlin discusses the offensive in some detail while including mention of Stalin's intentions, the Prague uprising, and role of the Russian Liberation Army. Erickson wrote the work to present a balanced view of Soviet politics and military operations during the war, and so his description of actions by German forces is correspondingly limited. (Note: While there are a variety of sources discussing the fates of some of the individual German units, there does not appear to be a single comprehensive work presenting the combat actions and capitulations of the German units in Army Groups Centre and Ostmark during the period 6–11 May 1945.)

== Losses ==
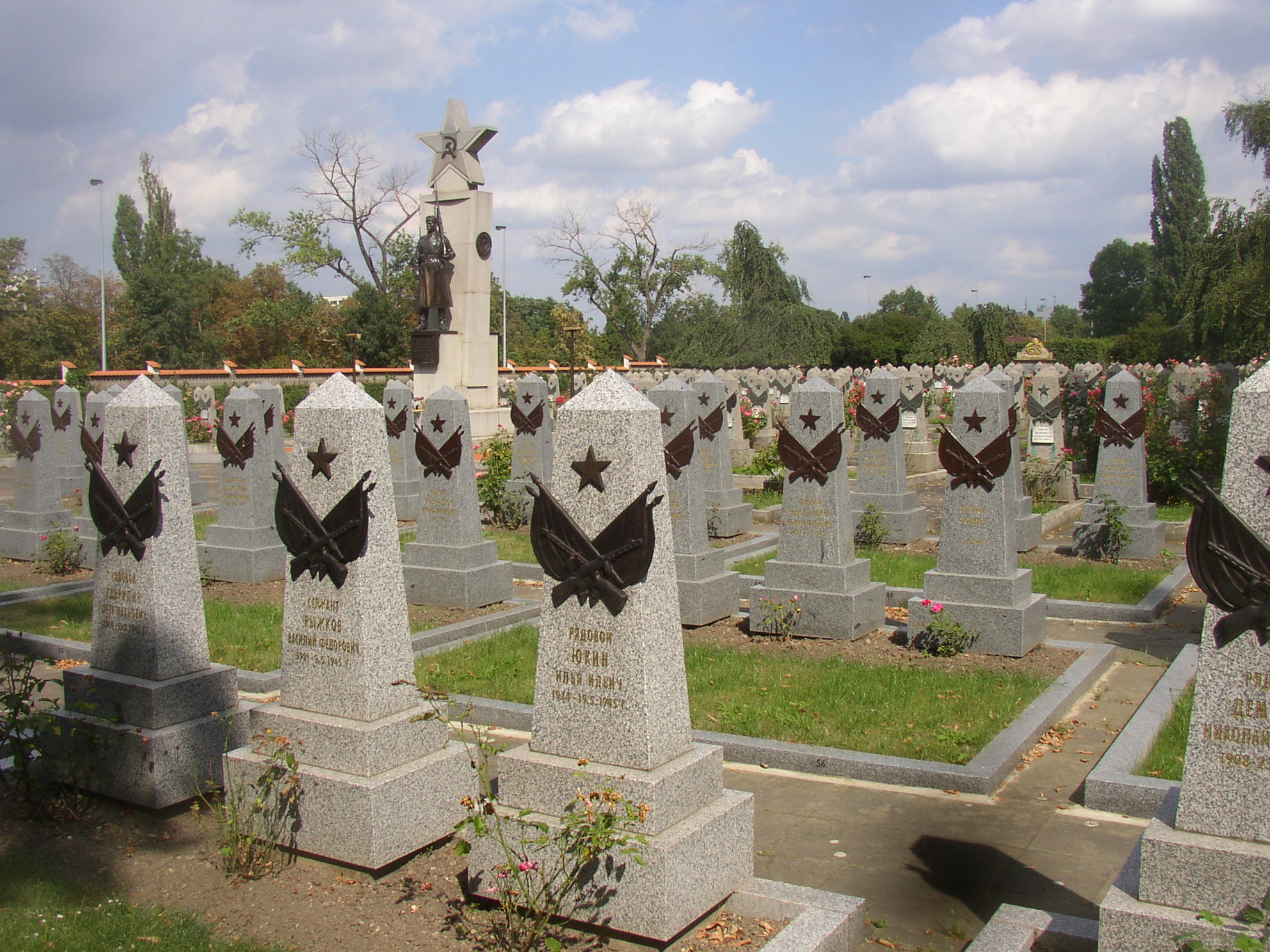
Olšany Cemetery in Prague: Honorary burial site of Soviet soldiers fallen during the battle of the city.

=== Allied nations ===
- Personnel
  - 11,997 irrecoverable
  - 40,501 wounded and sick
  - Total 52,498
- Matériel
  - 373 tanks and self-propelled guns
  - 1,006 artillery pieces
  - 80 aircraft

Losses: Allied, Prague Offensive Source: G. F. Krivosheev, Soviet Casualties and Combat Losses in the Twentieth Century, p. 159
| Unit(s) | Strength 6 May 1945 | Total losses | Average daily losses |
|---|---|---|---|
| 1st Ukrainian Front | 806,400 | 23,383 | 3,897 |
| 2nd Ukrainian Front | 613,400 | 14,436 | 2,406 |
| 4th Ukrainian Front | 350,900 | 11,529 | 1,922 |
| Polish 2nd Army | 69,500 | 887 | 148 |
| Romanian 1st and 4th Armies | 139,500 | 1,730 | 288 |
| Czechoslovak Army Corps | 48,400 | 533 | 89 |

=== German ===
Losses in men of both army groups taken prisoner by the Soviets amounted to some 860,000 men. The Soviets claimed to have captured 9,500 guns and mortars, 1,800 armored vehicles, and 1,100 aircraft in the course of the operation.

== See also ==
- Battle of Berlin – 1945
- Vienna offensive – 1945
- Prague uprising – 1945
- End of World War II in Europe
- Last stand
