= Peter Dubovský =

Peter Dubovský may refer to:

- Peter Dubovský (footballer) (1972–2000), Slovak international football player
- Peter Dubovský (bishop) (1921–2008), Slovak Roman Catholic prelate, Auxiliary Bishop of Banská Bystrica (1991–1997)
