= Rakovice (Písek District) =

- Municipality
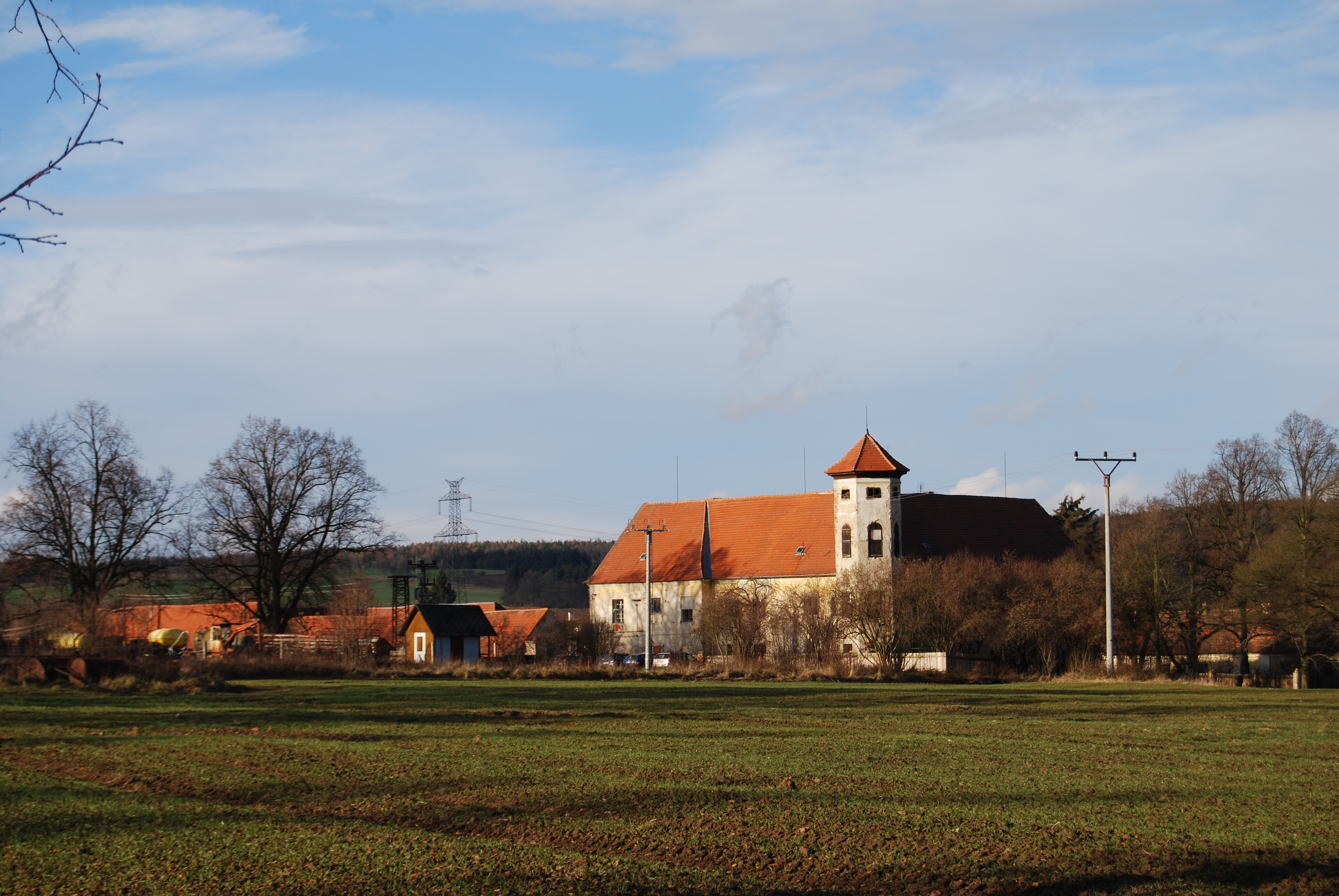
- View from the east

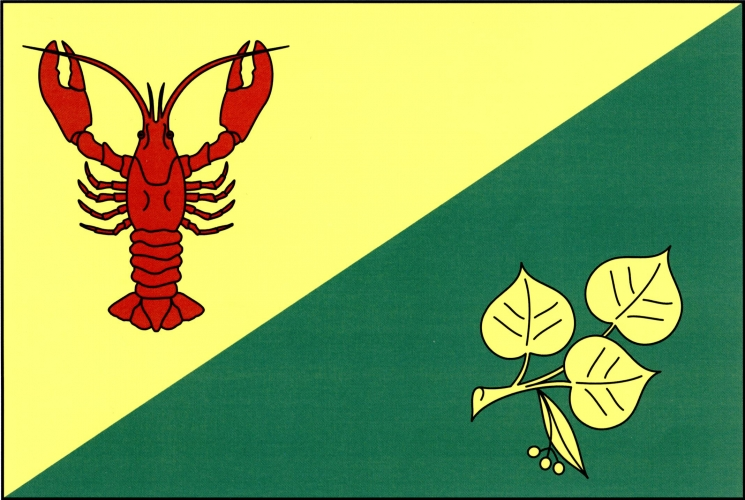
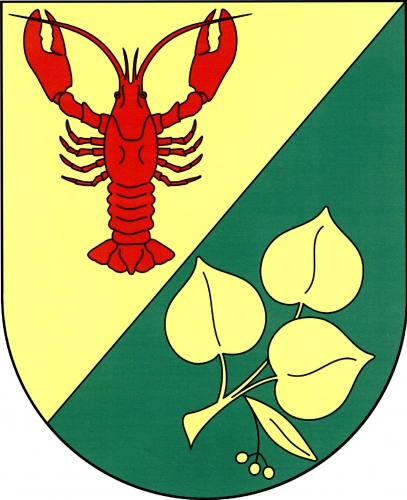
- Flag Coat of arms

- Location in the Czech Republic
- Coordinates: 49°28′17″N 14°3′17″E
- Country: Czech Republic
- Region: South Bohemian
- District: Písek
- First mentioned: 1045

Area
  - Total: 10.48 km^{2} (4.05 sq mi)
- Elevation: 438 m (1,437 ft)

Population (2026-01-01)
  - Total: 227
  - Density: 21.7/km^{2} (56.1/sq mi)
- Time zone: UTC+1 (CET)
  - Summer (DST): UTC+2 (CEST)
- Postal code: 398 04
- Website: www.rakovice.cz

Rakovice is a municipality and village in Písek District in the South Bohemian Region of the Czech Republic. It has about 200 inhabitants.

== Etymology ==
The name is derived from the personal name Rak, meaning "the village of Rak's people".

== Geography ==
Rakovice is located about 19 kilometres (12 mi) north of Písek and 68 km (42 mi) southwest of Prague. It lies on the border between the Tábor Uplands and Benešov Uplands. The Skalice River flows through the eastern part of the municipal territory. The highest point is the hill Jezvinec at 545 m (1,788 ft) above sea level. There are several fishponds in the municipality.

== History ==
The first written mention of Rakovice is from 1045, when Duke Bretislav I donated the village to the Břevnov Monastery.

In the Rakovice watermill, on 12 May 1945, the commander of the German Waffen-SS army Carl Friedrich von Pückler-Burghauss signed the capitulation and thus ended the Battle of Slivice, which was the last battle of World War II in Europe.

== Demographics ==
Historical population

Year	Pop.	±%
1869	574	—
1880	624	+8.7%
1890	579	−7.2%
1900	594	+2.6%
1910	579	−2.5%

Year	Pop.	±%
1921	571	−1.4%
1930	513	−10.2%
1950	403	−21.4%
1961	380	−5.7%
1970	333	−12.4%

Year	Pop.	±%
1980	263	−21.0%
1991	204	−22.4%
2001	209	+2.5%
2011	218	+4.3%
2021	273	+25.2%

Source: Censuses

== Transport ==
The D4 motorway from Prague to Písek runs through the municipality.

== Sights ==
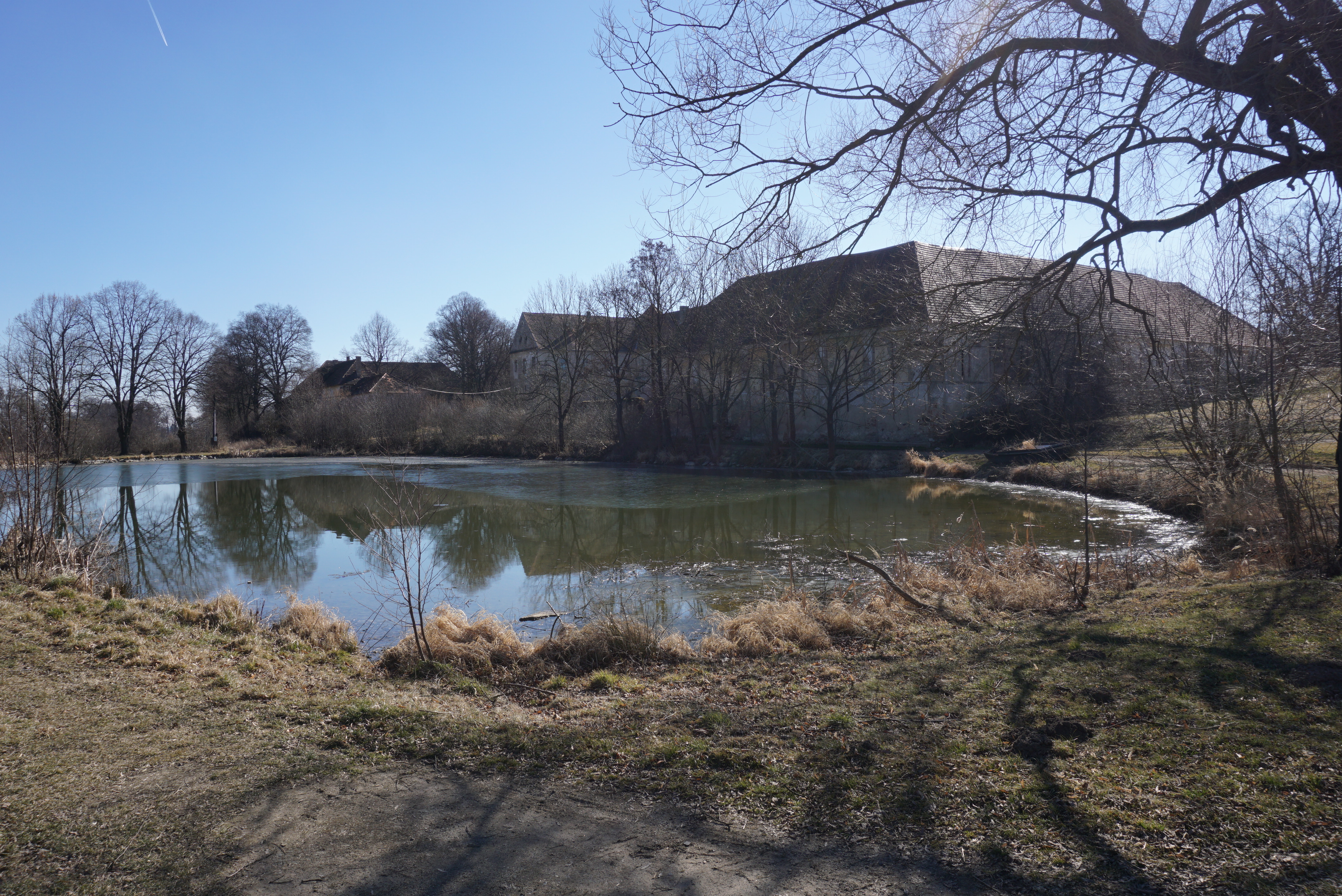
Rakovice Castle

The most important monument is the Rakovice Castle. It was built in the Baroque style in 1728–1730. The castle complex also includes several other Baroque buildings and a landscape park.

In the centre of Rakovice is the Chapel of Saint John of Nepomuk. It is a simple rural chapel, built in the late Baroque style in 1791–1792.

== Twin towns – sister cities ==
Rakovice is twinned with:

- Rakovice, Slovakia
