= Prince Albert of Saxe-Altenburg =

German prince (1843–1902)

Prince Albert
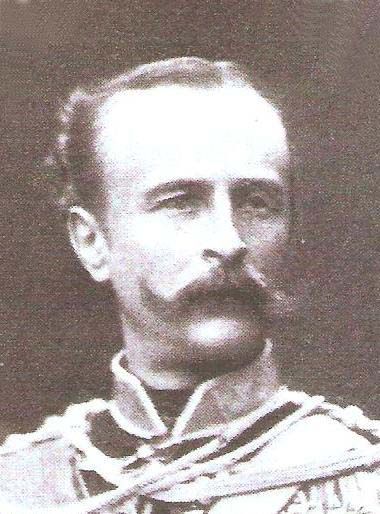
- Prince Albert c. 1890
- Born: 14 April 1843; Munich, Kingdom of Bavaria, German Confederation
- Died: 22 May 1902 (aged 59); Remplin, German Empire
- Spouse: Marie of Prussia (m. 1885; died 1888) Duchess Helene of Mecklenburg-Strelitz (m. 1891)
- Issue: Olga, Countess von Pückler-Burghauss; Marie, Princess Reuss of Köstritz
Names
- Albert Heinrich Joseph Carl Viktor Georg Friedrich
- House: Saxe-Altenburg
- Father: Eduard of Saxe-Altenburg
- Mother: Luise Caroline Reuss of Greiz

Prince Albert of Saxe-Altenburg (Albert Heinrich Joseph Carl Viktor Georg Friedrich; 14 April 1843 in Munich – 22 May 1902 in Serrahn) was a German prince of the ducal house of Saxe-Altenburg.

== Biography ==
=== Family and early life ===
Prince Albert was the eldest son (third in order of birth but the only one who survived to adulthood) of Prince Eduard of Saxe-Altenburg (youngest son of Frederick, Duke of Saxe-Hildburghausen) and his second wife, Princess Luise Caroline Reuss of Greiz.

He entered the Russian army early in life, and attained the rank of Major-General in this service, but subsequently exchanged it for the Prussian army, where he became a general of cavalry.

=== Marriages ===
He was first married in Berlin on 6 May 1885 to Princess Marie of Prussia, widow of Prince Henry of the Netherlands.

They had two daughters:

- Princess Olga Elisabeth Carola Victoria Maria Anna Agnes Antoinette of Saxe-Altenburg (Schloß Albrechtsberg, 17 April 1886 – Münster, 13 January 1955); married on 20 May 1913 Karl Frederick, Count of Pückler-Burghauss and Freiherr von Groditz (1886–1945).
- Marie (Schloß Albrechtsberg, 6 June 1888 – Hamburg, 12 November 1947); married on 20 April 1911 Heinrich XXXV, Prince von Reuss of Köstritz (1887–1936, son of Heinrich VII, Prince Reuss of Köstritz); they divorced in 1921, and Heinrich remarried to Princess Marie Adelheid of Lippe-Biesterfeld. Marie adopted in 1942 her godson Theodor Franz (Graf Praschma) von Sachsen-Altenburg (1934–2012).

Princess Marie died in 1888 from the effects of puerperal fever. A few years later on 13 December 1891, at Remplin, Albert married Duchess Helene of Mecklenburg-Strelitz. The couple had no children.

Albert was a conspicuous figure in Berlin society, and was a great favorite due to his "clever" mind, genial disposition, pleasant address, and enthusiasm as a sportsman. Marie died in 1888. Sources reported that the Emperor′s "arbitrary manners" became so intolerable to Albert and others, as they were used to the days of social courtesy under the old Wilhelm I.

Prince Albert died on 22 May 1902 at Remplin.

== Honours ==
He received the following orders and decorations:

- (Saxe-Coburg and Gotha) (Duchy of Saxe-Altenburg) (Saxe-Meiningen) Ernestine duchies: Grand Cross of the Saxe-Ernestine House Order, May 1861
- Saxe-Weimar-Eisenach: Grand Cross of the White Falcon, 17 December 1866
- Kingdom of Saxony: Knight of the Rue Crown
- Mecklenburg: Grand Cross of the Wendish Crown, with Crown in Ore
- Ascanian duchies: Grand Cross of Albert the Bear, 1 January 1863; with Swords, 2 November 1864
- Kingdom of Hanover: Grand Cross of the Royal Guelphic Order, 1862
- Persian Empire: Order of the Lion and the Sun, 1st Class
- Kingdom of Italy: Grand Cross of Saints Maurice and Lazarus
- Kingdom of Prussia:
  - Knight of the Red Eagle, 3rd Class with Swords, 1864; Grand Cross with Swords on Ring, 6 May 1885
  - Member of the Royal House Order of Hohenzollern, with Swords
  - Knight of Justice of the Johanniter Order, 1900
  - Iron Cross (1870), 2nd Class
- Oldenburg: Grand Cross of the Order of Duke Peter Friedrich Ludwig, with Golden Crown and Collar
- Netherlands: Grand Cross of the Netherlands Lion
- Austria-Hungary: Grand Cross of the Imperial Order of Leopold, 1889
- Russian Empire:
  - Knight of St. George, 4th Class
  - Knight of St. Vladimir, 2nd Class with Swords
  - Knight of St. Alexander Nevsky
  - Knight of St. Anna, 3rd Class with Swords
