= Milín =

- Municipality
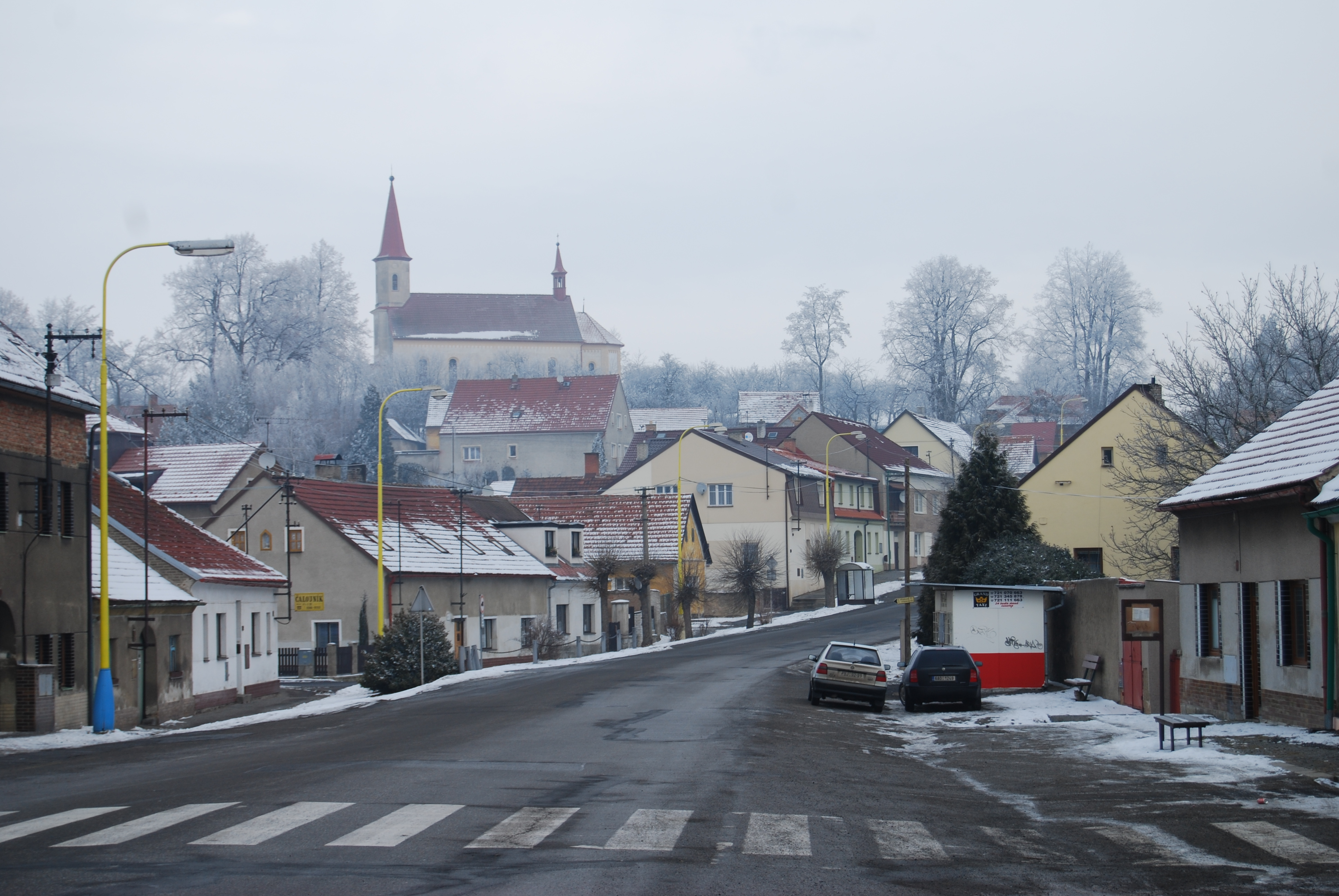
- Centre of Milín

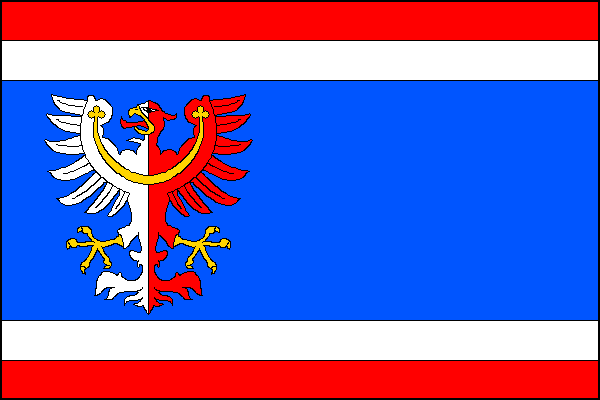
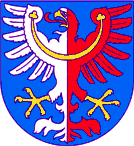
- Flag Coat of arms

- Location in the Czech Republic
- Coordinates: 49°37′55″N 14°2′46″E
- Country: Czech Republic
- Region: Central Bohemian
- District: Příbram
- First mentioned: 1336

Area
  - Total: 24.13 km^{2} (9.32 sq mi)
- Elevation: 547 m (1,795 ft)

Population (2026-01-01)
  - Total: 2,184
  - Density: 90.51/km^{2} (234.4/sq mi)
- Time zone: UTC+1 (CET)
  - Summer (DST): UTC+2 (CEST)
- Postal codes: 262 31, 262 63
- Website: www.milin.cz

Milín is a municipality and village in Příbram District in the Central Bohemian Region of the Czech Republic. It has about 2,200 inhabitants.

== Administrative division ==
Milín consists of six municipal parts (in brackets population according to the 2021 census):

- Milín (1,646)
- Buk (96)
- Kamenná (63)
- Konětopy (219)
- Rtišovice (34)
- Stěžov (63)

Kamenná forms an exclave of the municipal territory.

== Etymology ==
The initial name of the village was Milen, derived from the personal name Milén. In the 16th century, the name was distorted to Milín.

== Geography ==
Milín is located about 6 kilometres (4 mi) southeast of Příbram and 50 km (31 mi) southwest of Prague. It lies in the Benešov Uplands. The highest point is the hill Levín at 612 m (2,008 ft) above sea level. The brook Líšnický potok originates here and supplies a system of small fishponds.

== History ==
The first written mention of Milín is from 1336.

The Battle of Slivice, which was the last major battle of World War II in the territory of Czechoslovakia, took place within the municipality on 11–12 May 1945.

== Demographics ==
Historical population

Year	Pop.	±%
1869	2,271	—
1880	2,179	−4.1%
1890	2,176	−0.1%
1900	2,087	−4.1%
1910	1,928	−7.6%

Year	Pop.	±%
1921	1,820	−5.6%
1930	1,685	−7.4%
1950	1,308	−22.4%
1961	2,258	+72.6%
1970	2,202	−2.5%

Year	Pop.	±%
1980	2,139	−2.9%
1991	2,031	−5.0%
2001	2,044	+0.6%
2011	2,099	+2.7%
2021	2,121	+1.0%

Source: Censuses

== Transport ==
The D4 motorway from Prague to Písek runs through the municipality.

== Sights ==
The Church of Saint Wenceslaus used to be a granary from 1824, which was rebuilt into a church in 1887–1890.

The most valuable building is the Church of Saint Peter in the Slivice hamlet. It is originally an early Gothic church from the turn of the 12th and 13th centuries. The late Gothic tower was added at the end of the 15th century. Baroque modifications of the church were made in 1696 and in the 18th century.

== Twin towns – sister cities ==
Milín is twinned with:

- Ledro, Italy
