= Dominik Kalata =

Slovakian Roman Catholic prelate (1925–2018)

Dominik Kalata S.J.
- Titular Bishop of Semta
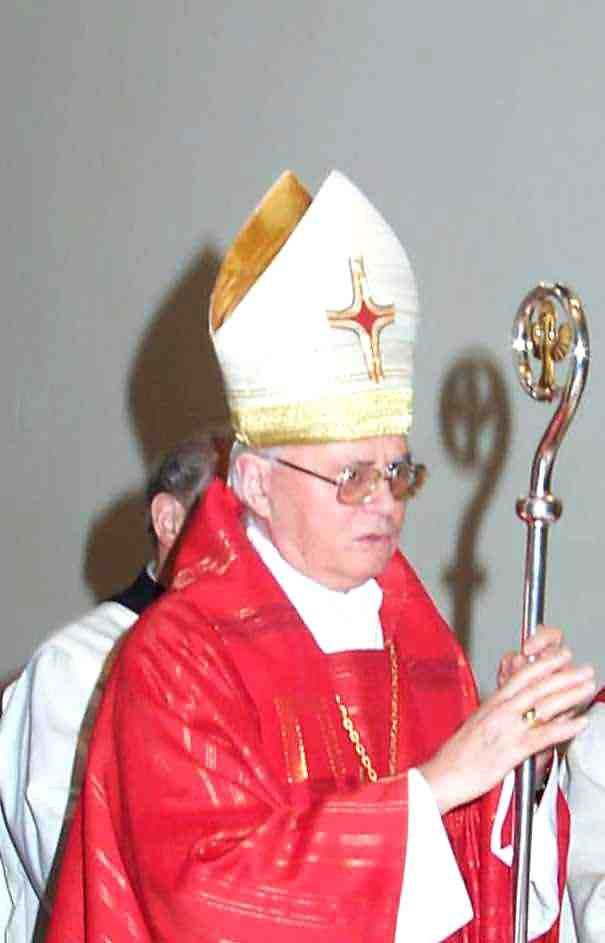
- Bishop Dominik Kalata in 1999
- Native name: Dominik Kaľata
- Church: Catholic Church
- Diocese: Semta
- In office: 16 March 1985 – 24 August 2018
- Predecessor: Sergio Otoniel Contreras Navia
- Successor: Juan Gómez

Orders
- Ordination: 12 August 1951
- Consecration: 9 September 1955 by Ján Chryzostom Korec

Personal details
- Born: Dominik Kaľata; 19 May 1925 Nová Belá, Repulic of Poland
- Died: 24 August 2019 (aged 94) Ivanka pri Dunaji, Slovakia

Dominik Kalata, SJ, (19 May 1925 in Nowa Biała – 23 August 2018) was a Slovak Catholic prelate who served as a titular Bishop of Semta.

Kalata was ordained a Catholic priest on 12 August 1951 and clandestinely as a bishop on 9 September 1955 by Ján Chryzostom Korec, SJ, because of the Communist government of Czechoslovakia and its persecution of the Catholic Church. On 16 March 1985 he was officially appointed a titular bishop.

Kalata died on 23 August 2018 in Ivanka pri Dunaji, Slovakia.

Catholic Church titles
Preceded by Sergio Otoniel Contreras Navia	Titular Bishop of Semta; 1985–2018	Succeeded by Juan Gómez
