= Princess Marie of Prussia (1855–1888) =

Princess Marie
- Princess Henry of the Netherlands; Princess Albert of Saxe-Altenburg
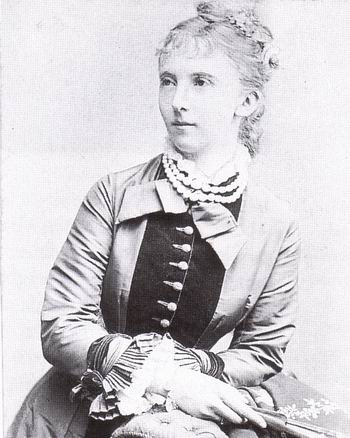
- Princess Marie of Prussia in 1878
- Born: 14 September 1855; Marmorpalais, Potsdam, Kingdom of Prussia
- Died: 20 June 1888 (aged 32); Schloss Abrechtesberg, Dresden, Kingdom of Saxony, German Empire
- Spouse: Prince Henry of the Netherlands (m. 1878; died 1879) Prince Albert of Saxe-Altenburg (m. 1885)
- Issue: Olga, Countess Karl Friedrich von Pückler-Burghaus; Marie, Princess Heinrich XXXV Reuss of Köstritz
Names
- German: Marie Elisabeth Luise Friederike
- House: Hohenzollern
- Father: Prince Frederick Charles of Prussia
- Mother: Princess Maria Anna of Anhalt-Dessau

Princess Marie of Prussia (Marie Elisabeth Luise Friederike; 14 September 1855, Marmorpalais, Potsdam – 20 June 1888, Dresden), was a princess of the House of Hohenzollern. She was the daughter of Prince Frederick Charles of Prussia and later became second wife of Prince Henry of the Netherlands then the first wife of Prince Albert of Saxe-Altenburg. She was also the grandniece of William I, German Emperor.

== Life ==
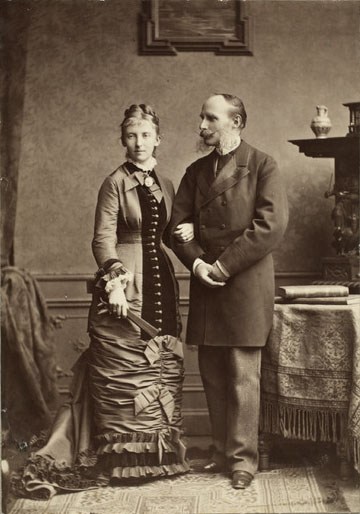
Prinzessin Marie and her first husband in 1878.

Princess Marie was the eldest daughter of Prussian field-marshal Prince Frederick Charles of Prussia (1828–1885) and Princess Maria Anna of Anhalt-Dessau (1837–1906). Marie's mother was the youngest daughter of Leopold IV, Duke of Anhalt and Princess Frederica of Prussia, Duchess of Anhalt-Dessau.

On 24 August 1878, Princess Marie married Prince Henry of Orange-Nassau at the Neuen Palais, who had since 1850 been Governor of Luxembourg and Admiralleutnant zur See. He was the third son of the King William II of the Netherlands and Grand Duchess Anna Pavlovna of Russia. The marriage between Marie and Henry was arranged in an attempt to save the House of Orange-Nassau from extinction, but it was to prove childless: barely five months later, in January 1879, Prince Henry died after contracting measles.

Six years later, on 6 May 1885, Princess Marie married Prince Albert of Saxe-Altenburg in Berlin, a son of Prince Eduard of Saxe-Altenburg and his second wife, Princess Luise Caroline Reuss zu Greiz.This marriage was to all reports a harmonious one and produced two daughters:

- Princess Olga of Saxe-Altenburg (17 April 1886 – 13 January 1955); married on 20 May 1913 Count Carl Friedrich von Pückler-Burghauss (1886–1945). They had three children:
  - Ella-Viola Gräfin von Pückler-Burghauss (8 April 1914 – 4 April 1982).
  - Eleonore-Renata Gräfin von Pückler-Burghauss (25 November 1919 – 4 November 1997).
  - Karl Rüdiger Graf von Pückler-Burghauss (born and died in 1923).
- Princess Marie of Saxe-Altenburg (6 June 1888 – 12 November 1947); married on 20 April 1911 in Altenburg, Prince Heinrich XXXV Reuss of Köstritz (b. 1 August 1887, Mauer – d. 17 January 1936, Loschwitz) son of Heinrich VII, Prince Reuss of Köstritz). They had one daughter before divorcing in 1921:
  - Marie Helene Reuss of Köstritz (b. 23 February 1912, Silesia - d. 1 August 1933, Korfantow)

The princess died at Schloss Abrechtesberg on 20 June 1888 from the effects of puerperal fever and was buried in the Saxe-Altenburg family vault. Her second husband remarried in 1891 to Duchess Helene of Mecklenburg-Strelitz in Remplin, the niece of Friedrich Wilhelm, Grand Duke of Mecklenburg-Strelitz, and granddaughter of Grand Duke Michael Pavlovich of Russia.

Princess Marie was the godmother of her nephew Prince Arthur of Connaught, only son of her sister Princess Louise Margaret of Prussia. The christening occurred in the private chapel at Windsor Castle.

== Ancestry ==
Ancestors of Princess Marie of Prussia (1855–1888)

8. Frederick William III of Prussia
4. Prince Charles of Prussia
9. Duchess Louise of Mecklenburg-Strelitz
2. Prince Frederick Charles of Prussia
10. Charles Frederick, Grand Duke of Saxe-Weimar-Eisenach
5. Princess Marie of Saxe-Weimar-Eisenach
11. Grand Duchess Maria Pavlovna of Russia
1. Princess Marie of Prussia
12. Frederick, Hereditary Prince of Anhalt-Dessau
6. Leopold IV, Duke of Anhalt
13. Princess Amalie of Hesse-Homburg
3. Princess Maria Anna of Anhalt-Dessau
14. Prince Louis Charles of Prussia
7. Princess Frederica of Prussia
15. Duchess Frederica of Mecklenburg-Strelitz

== Bibliography ==
- C. Arnold McNaughton: The Book of Kings: A Royal Genealogy, in 3 volumes (London, U.K.: Garnstone Press, 1973), volume 1, page 66
- Chads, Adelaide M. (1882). The Court of the Netherlands. Oxford University Press.
- Van der Kiste, John (2014). The Prussian Princesses. Fonthill Media. ISBN 978-1781553732.
- Zeepvat, Charlotte (2003). Queen Victoria's Family: A Select Bibliography. Duchy of Cornwall Office.
