= Battle of Slivice =

Battle

Coordinates: 49°38′36″N 14°02′50″E

- Part of the Eastern Front of World War II
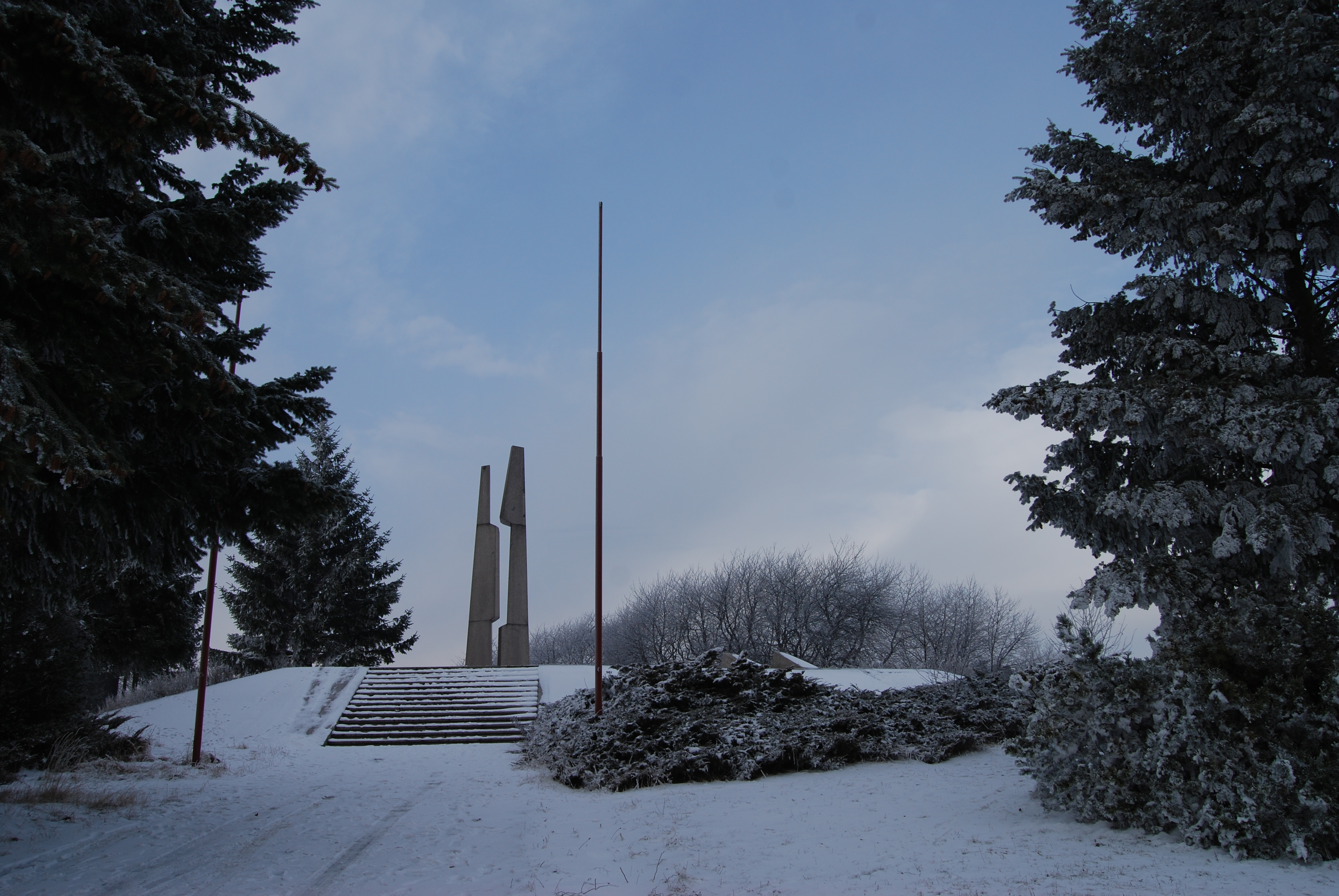
- Memorial near Slivice
Date	11–12 May 1945
Location	Slivice near Milín, Bohemia
Result	Allied victory

Belligerents
Soviet Union; Czechoslovakia; United States	Germany

Commanders and leaders
(Soviet Union) Ivan Fedotovich Seryogin (United States) LeRoy Irwin	(Nazi Germany) Carl Friedrich von Pückler-Burghauss †

Strength
Unknown	Approx 7,000

The Battle of Slivice (Czech: Bitva u Slivice) was the last large World War II battle in the area of the Czech lands. During 11–12 May 1945, German troops, trying to surrender to nearby American troops rather than the USSR, defended themselves against local partisans and the Red Army. The Germans eventually capitulated during early hours of May 12. About 6,000 men were captured by the Soviet troops.

== Background ==
On 7 May 1945, all German forces were ordered to remain in their positions and surrender. Field Marshal Ferdinand Schörner, however, the commander of the Army Group Centre deployed in Protectorate of Bohemia and Moravia, ordered his units to force their way westwards in order to surrender to American forces. The units reached the agreed demarcation line in western Bohemia and stopped there. Since the Red Army was still days away from the demarcation line, the partisans tried, mostly unsuccessfully, to stop the Germans, who responded with reprisals against the local population. On several occasions, Russian Liberation Army units that had been fighting on the German side – also trying to reach the Americans – skirmished with the Germans.

On 9 May, a large formation of German troops reached the area between villages Milín, Slivice and Čimelice, near the demarcation line. Among them were parts of Kampfgruppe Wallenstein. (Note: Kampfgruppe Wallenstein was formed to suppress the Prague Uprising) The formation was commanded by SS-Gruppenführer Carl Friedrich von Pückler-Burghauss. The soldiers were accompanied by fleeing German civilians. Because the road toward the Americans was blocked by local resistance units, Pückler-Burghauss ordered the establishment of defensive lines. After May 8, the Americans returned to the Soviet side any soldiers attempting to surrender.

== Battle ==
On 11 May, partisan groups led by Soviet officer Yevgeniy Antonovich Olesenski (Note: Captain Olesenski was parachuted into the area to organize the resistance) attempted to storm the Germans, but were driven back. Soviet Army units (104th Guards Rifle Division) arrived that afternoon and attacked the German positions.

The attack started with a heavy artillery and rocket bombardment. The Soviet bombardment was supported by 4th Armored Division of the U.S. Third Army's XII Corps. Later, troops from the 1st, 2nd and 4th Ukrainian Fronts attacked the German positions. During the night, the defense collapsed and, at around 03:00 of 12 May in the Rakovice Mill, Pückler-Burghauss signed the capitulation which was then countersigned by American and Soviet representatives. About 6,000 soldiers and a large number of vehicles were captured. After the battle, Czech partisans started mopping up operations in the Brdy forests to capture and execute the Waffen-SS troops that had escaped into the forests.

== Commemoration ==
In 1970, a memorial to the battle, designed by Václav Hilský, was unveiled in Slivice. Czech military history clubs, the Museum in Příbram and the Army of the Czech Republic have organized reenactments of the battle since 2001. Near to the villa (across the road) in Čimelice, where Pückler-Burghauss committed suicide, is another memorial with the inscription: "In this place on 9 May 1945 the American Army stopped the retreat of German Army. At the presence of American, Soviet and German military representants the last military surrender of Second World War in Europe was signed here on 12 May 1945".
