= Carl Friedrich von Pückler-Burghauss =

German military officer and SS general (1886–1945)

Carl Friedrich Graf von Pückler-Burghauss
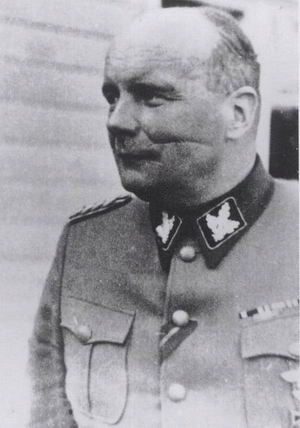
- Pückler-Burghauss, c. 1942–1944

Personal details
- Born: Carl Friedrich Graf von Pückler; 7 October 1886 Friedland, Kingdom of Prussia, German Empire
- Died: 12 May 1945 (aged 58) near Čimelice, Czechoslovakia
- Cause of death: Suicide by firearm
- Education: University of Bonn

Military service
- Allegiance: German Empire; Nazi Germany
- Branch/service: Prussian Army; Freikorps; German Army; Waffen-SS
- Years of service: 1908–1919; 1938–1945
- Rank: Major; SS-Gruppenführer and Generalleutnant of the Waffen-SS
- Commands: 15th Waffen Grenadier Division of the SS (1st Latvian); Waffen-SS, Protectorate of Bohemia and Moravia
- Battles/wars: World War I; World War II; Invasion of Poland; Battle of the Netherlands; Battle of France; Prague offensive; Battle of Slivice
- Awards: Clasp to the Iron Cross, 1st and 2nd class War Merit Medal, 1st and 2nd class with swords

Carl Friedrich von Pückler-Burghauss (7 October 1886 – 12 May 1945) was a German military officer and an SS-Gruppenführer in Nazi Germany. A member of both the Nazi Party and the Sturmabteilung (SA), he served in the Reichstag for one term in 1933. During the Second World War, Pückler-Burghauss commanded the Latvian Division of the Waffen-SS, and then was the commander of the Waffen-SS units in the Protectorate of Bohemia and Moravia. He died by suicide on the day that he surrendered to the Red Army.

== Ancestry and family ==
Born as Carl Friedrich Graf von Pückler in Upper Silesia, he was the son of Friedrich Graf von Pückler-Burghauss (1849–1920), a retired Major in the Prussian Army, and his wife, Ella von Köppen (1862–1899). (He would add Burghauss to his name on his father's death in 1920.) At the time of his birth, his father was district governor in Friedland. On 20 May 1913, Carl Friedrich married his 5th cousin, Princess Olga Elisabeth of Saxe-Altenburg (1886–1955), member of the House of Wettin, daughter of Prince Albert of Saxe-Altenburg and Princess Marie of Prussia. Together, they had two daughters and one son:

- Baroness Ella-Viola von Pückler-Burghauss (8 April 1914 – 4 April 1982, Oberaudorf). She married Andreas von Flotow (16 April 1913, Brussels – 14 September 1990) on 3 November 1941. They had three children:
  - Adrian von Flotow (b. 5 June 1943). Married firstly Sylvia Kolck (b. 27 March 1945) on 10 July 1968 in Siggen. They had one son before divorcing in 1976. He then married secondly, Marie-Elisabeth von Sennyey (b. 17 October 1947, Vienna) on 12 May 1978 in Wangen im Allgäu. They had two daughters before divorcing in 2019.
    - Constantin von Flotow (b. 1969, Brussels)
    - Stephanie von Flotow (b. 18 December 1980, Brussels)
    - Marie Sophie von Flotow (b. 13 December 1982).
  - Viola von Flotow (b. 27 March 1945, Prague). She married Jan Peter Ratdke (b. 22 February 1944) on 5 May 1977. They had two daughters:
    - Elle-Jesslyn Ratdke (b. 3 November 1977)
    - Ann-Leonie Ratdke (b. 1 December 1981)
  - Cyrill von Flotow (b. 1 December 1955, Nonnenhorn). He married Elke Ritter (b. 23 August 1953, Lustenau) on 25 April 1980 in Wangen im Allgäu. They had two sons:
    - Dominic von Flotow (b. 6 October 1981)
    - Sandro von Flotow (b. 22 November 1987, Lübbecke)
- Baroness Eleonore-Renata von Pückler-Burghauss (25 November 1919 – 1997). She married firstly, Manfred von Schröder (b. 6 November 1914) on 9 September 1939. They had two children before they divorced in 1948. She married secondly, Jurgen Petersen (13 September 1913 – 5 September 1987) on 21 April 1949. They had two sons.
  - Karoline-Eleonore von Schröder (b. 26 September 1940). She married Rudolf Menzel (b. 10 August 1924) on 12 June 1965. They had two sons:
    - Robin Menzel (b. 29 June 1966, Stamford)
    - Johann Menzel (b. 16 July 1968, Washington)
  - Rudiger von Schröder (10 March 1943 – 30 October 2020, Frankfurt-am-Main). He married Xenia Blum and they had three children:
    - Luisa von Schröder (b. 31 July 1982, Luxembourg)
    - Heinrich von Schröder (b. 6 July 1984, Luxembourg)
    - Helena von Schröder (b. 28 December 1988)
  - Marcus Petersen (6 December 1950 - 20 July 2005)
  - Sylvius Petersen (b. 12 January 1959). He married Andrea Bunemann (b. 12 July 1959) on 12 January 1990. They had one son before divorcing in 1993.
    - Jasper Petersen (b. 21 December 1992)
- Carl Rüdiger Graf von Pückler-Burghauss who died a few months after his birth in 1923.

== Early life ==
Pückler-Burghauss attended the Gymnasium in Breslau (today, Wrocław) until 1905 and then studied law and political science at the University of Bonn. On 1 April 1908, he entered the 1st (Silesian) Life Cuirassiers Regiment of the Royal Prussian Army, headquartered in Breslau, as a Fahnenjunker (officer cadet). The following year, he was commissioned as a Leutnant. He served in on both the western and eastern fronts during the First World War and won the Iron Cross 1st and 2nd class. Promoted to Oberleutnant in 1915, he served as an orderly officer and an adjutant with the 5th Cavalry Division and, from 1917, as a general staff officer with the VI Army Corps. He left the army in 1919 with the rank of Hauptmann and served with Freikorps units in Upper Silesia until 1920. Following the death of his father that year, he returned to Schloss Friedland, his family estate, to assume its management. In 1924, he became a member of Der Stahlhelm, the right-wing German veterans association. He also was a member of the conservative German National People's Party from 1919 until 1 December 1931. At that point, he joined the Nazi Party (membership number 788,697) and its paramilitary organization, the Sturmabteilung (SA).

== Career in Nazi Germany ==
In July 1932, Pückler-Burghauss was appointed as the advisor on military issues on the staff of the SA-Gruppe Schlesien, commanded by Edmund Heines. On 15 December, he advanced to chief of staff and, on 1 June 1933, he was named chief of staff of SA-Obergruppe I (later redesignated SA-Obergruppe III), both also headed by Heines. At the parliamentary election in March 1933, Pückler-Burghauss was elected as a deputy to the Reichstag, representing electoral constituency 9 (Oppeln). However, at the following election of November 1933, he was not re-nominated. On 15 March 1934, he became chief of staff of the newly-formed SA-Obergruppe VIII in Breslau, again under the command of Heines. At the Night of Long Knives on 30 June 1934, Heines was murdered but Pückler-Burghauss survived the purge. When the Obergruppen were disbanded, he was assigned to the staff at the Supreme SA Leadership as an Amtschef (office head). He was promoted to SA-Brigadeführer on 1 May 1937, and headed the Berlin liaison office from October 1937.

Pückler-Burghauss rejoined the army in April 1938 in his former rank of Hauptmann and served as an adjutant with the 4th Light Division and then as an intelligence officer with the XXXIII Army Corps. He saw combat in the Polish campaign at the start of the Second World War and earned the Clasp to the Iron Cross, 2nd class. He transferred to the 9th Panzer Division in January 1940 on its formation and saw action in the Battle of the Netherlands and the Battle of France, earning the Clasp to the Iron Cross, 1st class. He was promoted to Major on 1 July 1940. From January until 19 August 1941, he was the general staff officer with the 337th Infantry Division and then left military service.

In his Party paramilitary career, Pückler-Burghauss transferred from the SA to the Allgemeine SS on 1 July 1940 (SS number 365,136) as an SS-Brigadeführer. He was assigned first to SS-Oberabschnitt Südost in Breslau until 1 November 1941 and then SS-Oberabschnitt Spree in Berlin. After finishing police training, he was made the deputy to Higher SS and Police Leader (HSSPF) Erich von dem Bach-Zelewski in the Army Group Centre Rear Area on 2 January 1942. On the personal recommendation of Kurt Daluege, the chief of the Ordnungspolizei, Pückler-Burghauss was granted the rank of Generalmajor of Police on 30 January. He deputized for Bach-Zelewski as HSSPF from 2 January until 24 March 1943 during the latter's extended medical leave. Among his duties were maintaining security in the occupied territory and combating partisans. In August 1942, he joined the Waffen-SS and was promoted to Generalmajor of the Waffen-SS in April 1943. From 1 May 1943 to 16 February 1944 he commanded the newly formed Latvian Division. On 20 March 1944, he was assigned as the commander of Waffen-SS forces in the Protectorate of Bohemia and Moravia, a post which he held until the end of the war. He was promoted to SS-Gruppenführer and Generalleutnant of the Waffen-SS effective 1 August 1944. During the Prague uprising of 5–9 May 1945, Pückler-Burghauss maintained a hard-line in negotiations with the Czech National Council, often threatening the complete destruction of Prague by aircraft and artillery bombardment. During the fierce fighting, the SS committed many war crimes, including shooting hostages and using civilians as human shields.

== Death ==
Contravening the terms of Germany's capitulation which took effect 8 May and required troops to remain in place, Pückler-Burghauss moved his forces west in an attempt to surrender to the American forces. His advance to the American lines was blocked by Czech partisans and his surrender offer was refused by the American commander. The Red Army's attack on 11 May resulted in the Battle of Slivice, in which the Germans were defeated. Pückler-Burghauss signed a capitulation around 3:00 a.m. on 12 May, the last document of surrender of World War II in Europe. Shortly afterward, he shot himself together with some of his staff.

== SA, SS and police ranks ==
Dates of rank
Date	Rank
December 1931	SA-Sturmbannführer
1 July 1932	SA-Obersturmbannführer
29 November 1932	SA-Standartenführer
10 April 1933	SA-Oberführer
1 May 1937	SA-Brigadeführer
1 July 1940	SS-Brigadeführer
30 January 1942	Generalmajor of Police
1 April 1943	Generalmajor of the Waffen-SS
1 August 1944	SS-Gruppenführer and Generalleutnant of the Waffen-SS

== Military ranks ==
Dates of rank
Date	Rank
18 October 1909	Leutnant
18 June 1915	Oberleutnant
18 May 1918; 1 April 1938	Hauptmann
1 July 1940	Major

== Sources ==
- Klee, Ernst (2007). Das Personenlexikon zum Dritten Reich. Wer war was vor und nach 1945. Frankfurt-am-Main: Fischer-Taschenbuch-Verlag. p. 473. ISBN 978-3-596-16048-8.
- Schiffer Publishing Ltd., ed. (2000). SS Officers List: SS-Standartenführer to SS-Oberstgruppenführer (As of 30 January 1942). Schiffer Military History Publishing. ISBN 0-7643-1061-5.
- Yerger, Mark C. (1997). The Allgemeine-SS: The Commands, Units and Leaders of the General SS. Schiffer Publishing Ltd. ISBN 0-7643-0145-4.
- Yerger, Mark C. (1999). The Waffen-SS Commanders: The Army, Corps and Divisional Leaders of a Legend. Vol. 2 Krüger to Zimmermann. Schiffer Military History. ISBN 978-0-764-30769-0.

Military offices
Preceded by SS-Brigadeführer Peter Hansen	Commander of 15th Waffen Grenadier Division of the SS (1st Latvian); 1 May 1943 – 16 February 1944	Succeeded by SS-Oberführer Nikolaus Heilmann
