= Rakovice, Piešťany District =

Rakovice
- Municipality
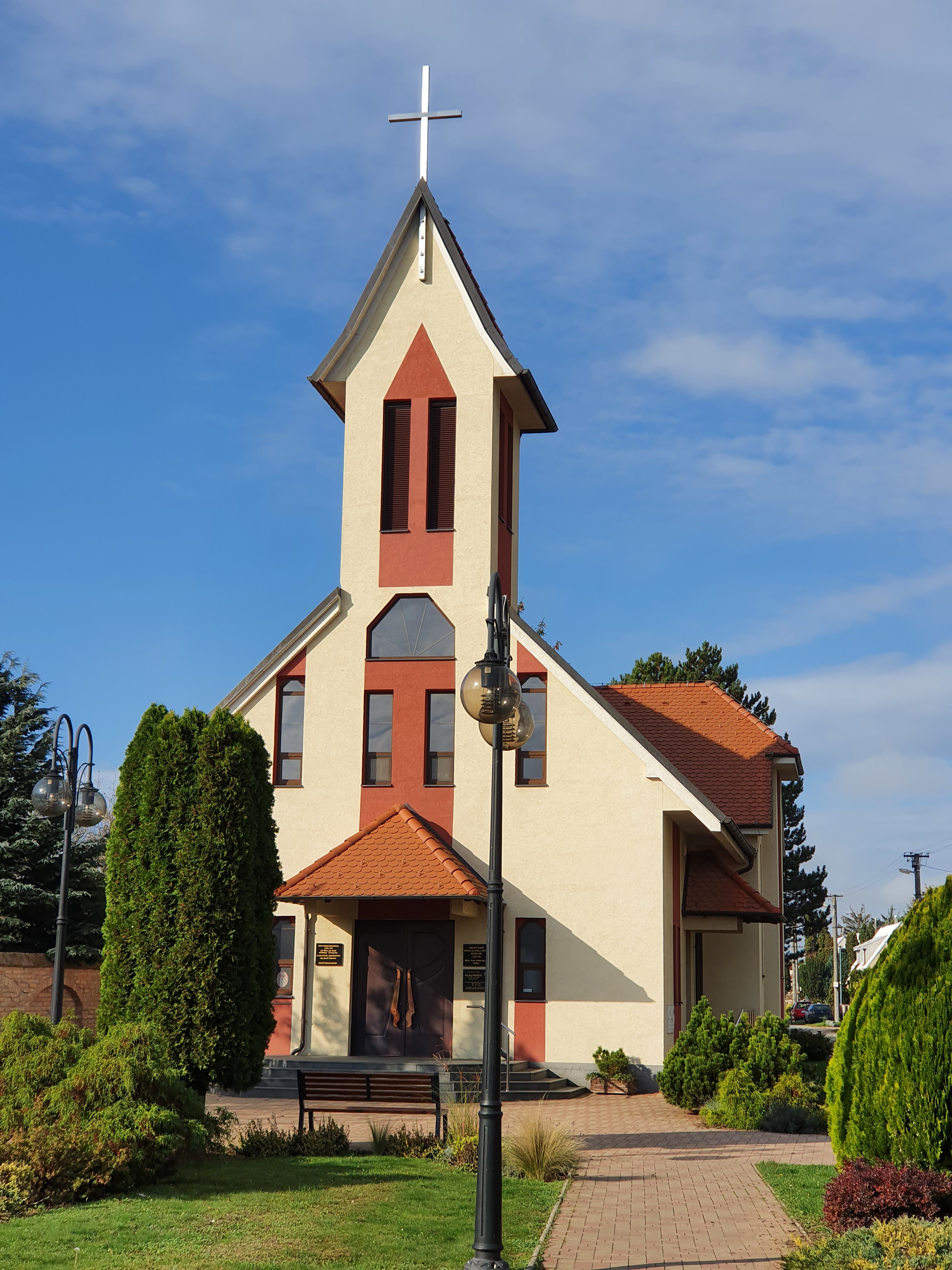

- Flag

- Location of Rakovice in the Trnava Region Location of Rakovice in Slovakia
- Coordinates: 48°34′N 17°44′E
- Country: Slovakia
- Region: Trnava Region
- District: Piešťany District
- First mentioned: 1262

Area
  - Total: 6.95 km^{2} (2.68 sq mi)
- Elevation: 160 m (520 ft)

Population (2025)
  - Total: 653
- Time zone: UTC+1 (CET)
  - Summer (DST): UTC+2 (CEST)
- Postal code: 922 08
- Area code: +421 33
- Vehicle registration plate (until 2022): PN
- Website: www.rakovice.sk

Rakovice (Hungarian: Rákfalu) is a village and municipality in Piešťany District in the Trnava Region of western Slovakia.

== History ==
In historical records the village was first mentioned in 1262.

== Geography ==
The municipality lies at an altitude of 160 metres (520 ft) and covers an area of 6.95 km^{2} (2.68 sq mi) (2025).

== Population ==
Population statistic (10 years)
Year	1995	2005	2015	2025
Count	482	522	577	653
Difference		+8.29%	+10.53%	+13.17%

Population statistic
Year	2024	2025
Count	641	653
Difference		+1.87%

It has a population of 653 people (31 December 2025).

=== Ethnicity ===
Census 2021 (1+ %)
Ethnicity	Number	Fraction
Slovak	598	96.45%
Not found out	20	3.22%
Total	620	

In year 2021 was 620 people by ethnicity 598 as Slovak, 20 as Not found out, 5 as Czech, 3 as Ukrainian, 2 as Polish, 2 as Other and 1 as Russian.

Note on population: The difference values of population numbers in the table "Population statistic" and in the sections "Ethnicity" & "Religion" is caused by the use of various statistical methods.

=== Religion ===
Census 2021 (1+ %)
Religion	Number	Fraction
Roman Catholic Church	401	64.68%
None	169	27.26%
Not found out	15	2.42%
Evangelical Church	10	1.61%
Total	620	

In year 2021 was 620 people by religion 401 from Roman Catholic Church, 169 from None, 15 from Not found out, 10 from Evangelical Church, 5 from Eastern Orthodox Church, 5 from Christian Congregations in Slovakia, 5 from Ad hoc movements, 3 from Jehovah's Witnesses, 3 from Other, 2 from Greek Catholic Church, 1 from Paganism and natural spirituality and 1 from Church of Jesus Christ of Latter-day Saints.
