= Hildburghausen Castle =

- Schloss Hildburghausen
- Hildburghausen
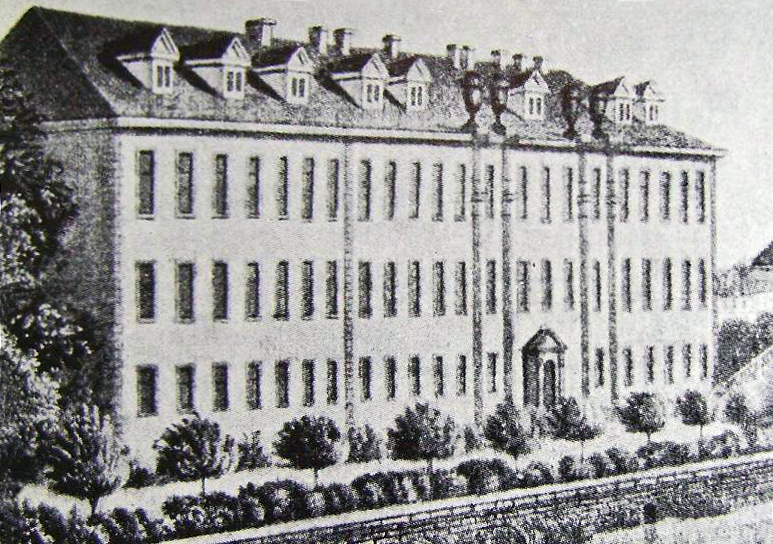
- Hildburghausen Castle, c. 1800

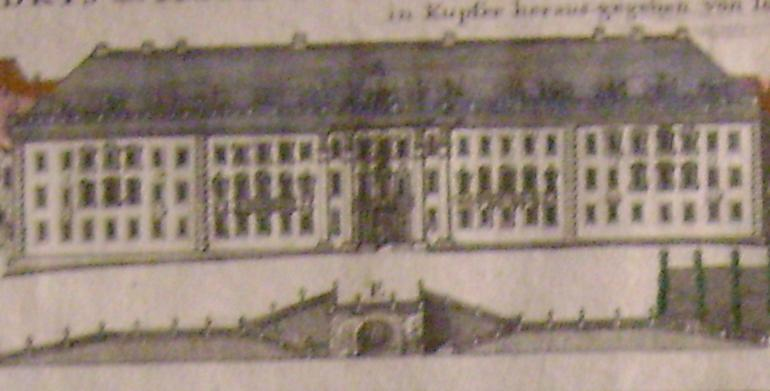
- Hildburghausen Castle, c. 1720

Site information
- Type: Palace
- Status: demolished

Location
- Location shown within Thuringia
- Coordinates: 50.4244°N 10.725°E

Site history
- Built: 27 May 1685
- Built by: Elias Gedeler
- Demolished: 1947-1950

Hildburghausen Castle in the eponymous town in Thuringia was the seat of government of the dukes of Saxe-Hildburghausen until 1826.

== Construction ==
The castle was built on the southwestern edge of the town centre, on the site of an earlier water castle. Following the example of Versailles, it was built as a horseshoe-shaped, three-story building. The Baroque structure consisted of a central main building with two wings attached at right angles, surrounding a court of honor. The castle was equipped with three main halls and several audience rooms with stucco walls and partially painted ceilings in Roccoco style. The façade was characterized by solid plasterwork, rectangular windows, simple stone jambs, rustication marking the corners, and a tarred, saddle-shaped roof. On the court side, the main wing was subdivided by two portals with Doric pilasters, topped by triangular pediments with figurative sculptures. The garden side had 22 window axis and was subdivided asymmetrically by two window bays framed with pilasters, but without pediments.

== History ==
The foundation stone for the castle was laid on 27 May 1685 by Duke Ernest of Saxe-Hildburghausen, in the presence of his court. The town had provided him with land for a castle and a park. Elias Gedeler led the construction project. He demolished part of the town wall, which had been intact until then. After Gedeler's death in 1693, the project was led by Johann Schnabel until its completion on 24 July 1695.

Originally a more playful version of the castle had been planned, but cost were overrun and extra taxes had to be levied to finance construction. The unadorned western wing was only two stories high, and was completed in 1707. This wing contained the stables, the coach house, the offices of the Hofmarschall and the castle Church of the Holy Spirit, with the ducal crypt. The church was formally inaugurated on 30 August 1705.

The largest hall in the palace was on the third floor wand was used as auditorium and for costumed balls. Later, the ducal library and natural history collection were housed in this hall. The castle repeatedly suffered damage from lightning strikes. In May 1783, lightning destroy the library and the castle church and killed five horses in the stables. In 1803, parts of the interior were renewed on the occasion of a visit by the King and Queen of Prussia.

After the court moved out in 1826, the castle served as housing for some civil servants. The castle church was converted into a courtroom in 1847. In 1867, the castle was partially demolished and modified to serve as barracks for the Second Battalion of the 6th Thuringian infantry Regiment, No. 95.

The castle was set on fire by American artillery on 7 April 1945 and destroyed almost completely. Only the façade and part of the staircase were left standing. Between 1947 and 1950, what remained of the castle was demolished.

== The park ==
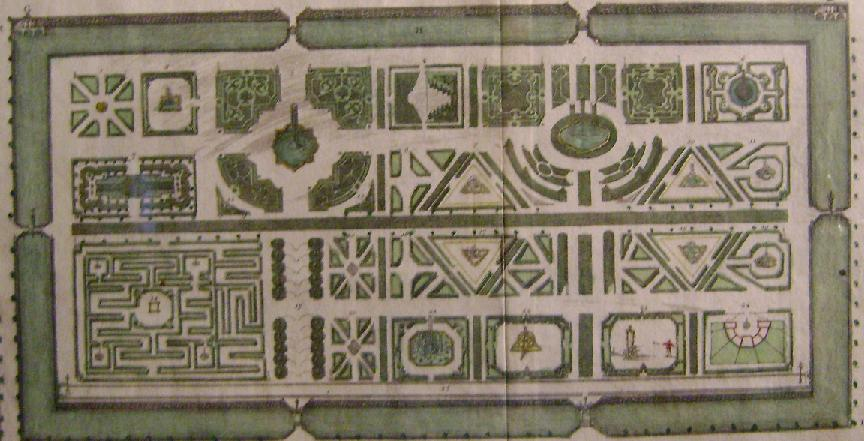
Map of the park in Hildburghausen in 1720, from Hofman's atlas

The construction of the castle park began in 1700. It was completed by Duke Ernest Frederick I, who wanted to imitate the court at Versailles. The park was equipped with grottoes, fountains, gazebos, sculptures, mazes and an outdoor theatre. In 1720, a canal was added, fed with water from the nearby Werra river. The Duke financed the canal by the selling his mother's dowry, the town of Culemborg to the province of Gelderland.

The maintenance of the park was very expensive. When the imperial receivers took over in 1792, one of their first acts was the transformation of the park into an English garden, in which form the park still exists today. In the centre of the park, we find the Louise Monument, which Duchess Charlotte built in 1811, in memory of her sister Louise.

In 1867, the army began to use the park as their exercise grounds. In 1890, ownership of the park was transferred back to the town and the park was opened to the public.

== Burials in the Castle Church ==
- Ernest, Duke of Saxe-Hildburghausen
- Countess Sophie Henriette of Waldeck
- Ernest Frederick I, Duke of Saxe-Hildburghausen
- Countess Sophia Albertine of Erbach-Erbach
- Ernst Frederick II, Duke of Saxe-Hildburghausen
- Caroline of Erbach-Fürstenau
- Ernest Frederick III, Duke of Saxe-Hildburghausen
- Princess Louise of Denmark (1726–1756)
- Christiane Sophie Charlotte of Brandenburg-Bayreuth
- Princess Ernestine of Saxe-Weimar

All of these were then reburied in the Ducal Mound in the Town Cemetery (Städtischen Friedhof) in Hildburghausen.
