= Louis Frederick of Saxe-Hildburghausen =

Louis Frederick
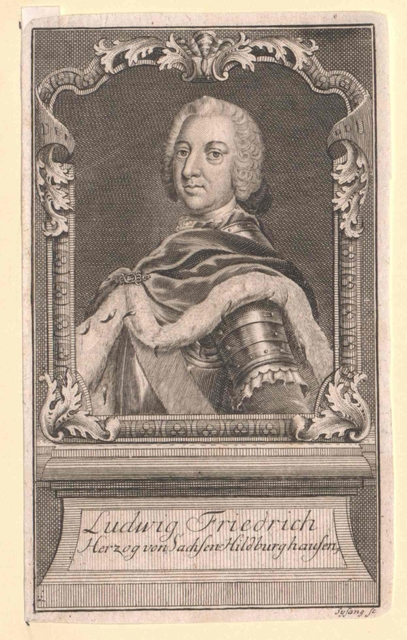
- Born: 11 September 1710; Hildburghausen
- Died: 10 June 1759 (aged 48); Nijmegen
- Spouse: Christiane Louise of Schleswig-Holstein-Sonderburg-Plön
- House: House of Wettin
- Father: Ernest Frederick I, Duke of Saxe-Hildburghausen
- Mother: Countess Sophia Albertine of Erbach-Erbach

Prince Ludwig Friedrich of Saxe-Hildburghausen (11 September 1710, Hildburghausen – 10 June 1759, Nijmegen), was a Prince of Saxe-Hildburghausen and General Field Marshal in the Bavarian army.

== Life ==
Louis Frederick was the younger son of Duke Ernst Friedrich I of Saxe-Hildburghausen and his wife Countess Sophia Albertine of Erbach-Erbach. In his youth he joined the Imperial military service and was trained by Friedrich Heinrich von Seckendorff. In 1738, he was promoted to major general, in 1739 to Generalfeldwachtmeister. Also in 1739, he participated in a campaign in Hungary against Turkey. In 1741, he left the imperial service and joined the Bavarian army, where he played a role in the War of the Austrian Succession. In 1742, he was promoted to General Field Marshal Lieutenant. Emperor Charles VII gave him the infantry regiment Holnstein and in 1743 promoted him to General Field Marshal. Also in 1743, when he was commander of the besieged town of Braunau am Inn, he minted tin and lead emergency coins.

Elector Maximilian III Joseph of Bavaria promoted him in 1745 to commander of all the Bavarian troops. He continued fighting in the War of the Austrian Succession in 1746–1748 in the Netherlands, where he had his own regiment, named Hildburghausen. In 1748, he resigned from Bavarian service and returned to his hometown.

He married on 4 May 1749 in Weikersheim Christiane Louise, daughter of Duke Joachim Frederick Holstein-Sonderburg-Plön and widow of Count Louis Albert of Hohenlohe-Weikersheim. The marriage remained childless. Through financial contributions of the house of Hohenlohe, the prince managed to complete an expensive restoration of Hellingen manor. Pursued by creditors, he returned to active service in the Netherlands.

He died in 1759, while governor of Nijmegen.

== Ancestors ==
Ancestors of Louis Frederick of Saxe-Hildburghausen

16. Johann, Duke of Saxe-Weimar
8. Ernest I, Duke of Saxe-Gotha
17. Dorothea Maria of Anhalt
4. Ernest, Duke of Saxe-Hildburghausen
18. Johann Philipp, Duke of Saxe-Altenburg
9. Princess Elisabeth Sophie of Saxe-Altenburg
19. Elisabeth of Brunswick-Wolfenbüttel
2. Ernest Frederick I, Duke of Saxe-Hildburghausen
20. Wolrad IV, Count of Waldeck-Eisenberg (= 28)
10. Prince Georg Friedrich of Waldeck
21. Anna of Baden-Durlach (= 29)
5. Countess Sophie Henriette of Waldeck
22. William, Count of Nassau-Siegen (= 30)
11. Countess Elisabeth Charlotte of Nassau-Siegen
23. Christiane of Erbach (= 31)
1. Louis Frederick of Saxe-Hildburghausen
24. George III, Count of Erbach-Breuberg
12. George Albert I, Count of Erbach-Schönberg
25. Countess Maria of Barby-Mühlingen
6. George Louis I, Count of Erbach-Erbach
26. George Frederick II, Count of Hohenlohe-Waldenburg in Schillingsfürst
13. Countess Elisabeth Dorothea of Hohenlohe-Waldenburg-Schillingsfürst
27. Dorothea Sophia of Solms-Hohensolms
3. Countess Sophia Albertine of Erbach-Erbach
28. Wolrad IV, Count of Waldeck-Eisenberg (= 20)
14. Philip Dietrich, Count of Waldeck
29. Anna of Baden-Durlach (= 21)
7. Countess Amalia Katharina of Waldeck-Eisenberg
30. William, Count of Nassau-Siegen (= 22)
15. Countess Maria Magdalena of Nassau-Siegen
31. Christiane of Erbach (= 23)

== References and sources ==
- Heinrich Ferdinand Schoeppl: Die Herzoge von Sachsen-Altenburg, Bozen, 1917, reprinted Altenburg, 1992
- Oliver Heyn: Militärisches Prestige und finanzielle Absicherung. Die Herzöge von Sachsen-Hildburghausen im Dienst der Vereinigten Niederlande (1680-1760), in: Zeitschrift für Thüringische Geschichte 71 (2017), S. 45–72.
- Dr. Rudolf Armin Human: Chronik der Stadt Hildburghausen, Hildburghausen, 1886
