= Warmuth =

Warmuth is a surname. Notable people with the surname include:

- Manfred K. Warmuth, German computer scientist
- Sophie Warmuth (born 2002), German speed skater
- Torsten Warmuth (born 1968), German artist and photographer
