= Prince Joseph of Saxe-Hildburghausen =

Prince of Saxe-Hildburghausen

Joseph
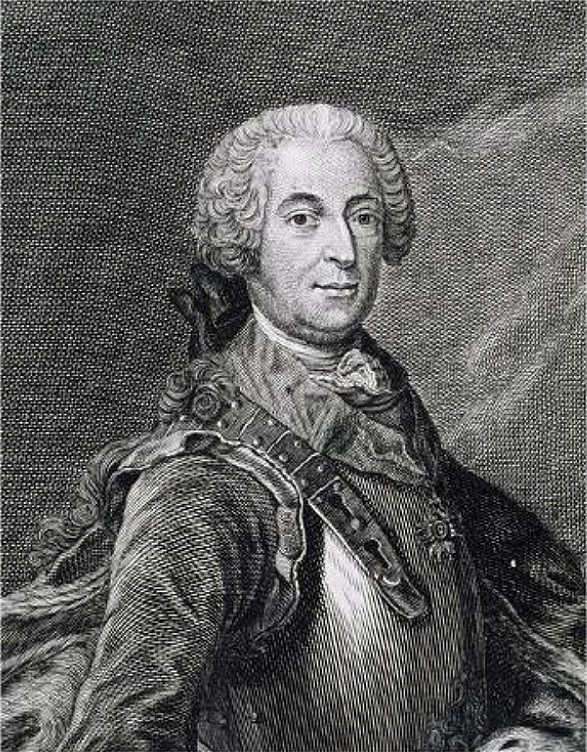
- Born: 5 October 1702; Hildburghausen, Holy Roman Empire of the German Nation
- Died: 4 January 1787 (aged 84); Hildburghausen
- Spouse: Anna Victoria of Savoy-Carignan (m. 1738; sep. 1757)
Names
- Joseph Maria Frederick Wilhelm
- House: House of Saxe-Hildburghausen
- Father: Ernest, Duke of Saxe-Hildburghausen
- Mother: Sophie of Waldeck

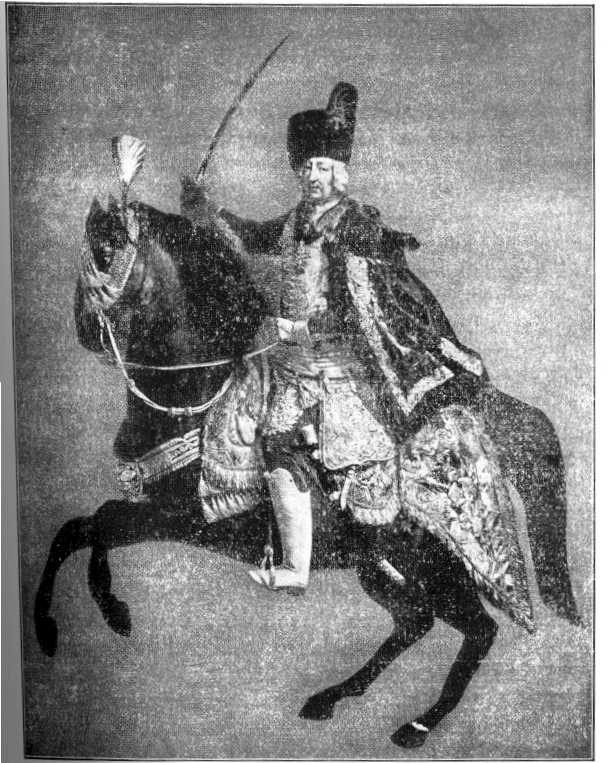
Prince Joseph on a horseback, circa 1730

Joseph Maria Frederick Wilhelm of Saxe-Hildburghausen, Duke in Saxony (German: Joseph Maria Friedrich Wilhelm Hollandinus, Prinz und Regent von Sachsen-Hildburghausen), 5 October 1702 – Hildburghausen, 4 January 1787, was a German officer, Generalfeldmarschall of the Imperial Army and Reichsgeneralfeldmarschall (Reichsgeneralfeldzeugmeister) of the Army of the Holy Roman Empire. He is best known for commanding the Allied Franco-Roman-German Army against the Prussian Army in the disastrous 90-minute Battle of Rossbach in November 1757.

== Early life ==
Graphic of Prince Jospeh

He was the third but second surviving son of Ernst, Duke of Saxe-Hildburghausen by his wife, Princess Sophie of Waldeck-Pyrmont, daughter of German field marshal Prince Georg Friedrich of Waldeck. His mother died ten days after his birth, on 15 October 1702.

He received the typical education of a nobleman of his time, with some educational journeys to the different countries of Europe. When he was sixteen years old, the prince joined the Habsburg Army and became already in 1719 a staff captain in the Infantry Regiment N°18 "Seckendorff", and fought with it in Sicily during the War of the Quadruple Alliance (1717–1720).

After his conversion to Catholicism in 1728, a rapid ascent in his military career began.

In 1729 he was appointed lieutenant-colonel (Oberstleutnant) and the next year (18 July 1730) colonel (Oberst) of the Regiment "Palffy". In January 1732 he got his own 8th Infantry Regiment. After the outbreak of War of the Polish Succession (1733–1735), he served briefly (since 1734 as Generalfeldwachtmeister) in campaigns in northern Italy. He distinguished himself, especially in the Battle of San Pietro, where he was wounded in the face, and was promoted to lieutenant field marshal (Feldmarschall-Leutnant) before the end of the war (on 30 April 1735).

Joseph ended the War of the Polish Succession with the rank of Feldzeugmeister (25 September 1736). Only one year later, during the Austro-Turkish War, 1737–1739, he was entrusted with the command of an Austrian Corps. In 1737, his attempt to conquer Banja Luka failed, but in practically all important engagements of the war, Joseph displayed personal bravery, for example in the Battle of Grocka (on 22 July 1739), where he covered the retreat of the Imperial Army.

== War of the Austrian Succession ==
After the war, Joseph was promoted on 11 June 1739 to Generalfeldzeugmeister of the Imperial Army and was appointed Governor of Komárom in Hungary. At the beginning of the War of the Austrian Succession (1740–1748) Joseph raised in Komárom new Hungarian Regiments and consulted by the Austrian military administration in the conduct of the war. In 1743 he was appointed High Military Director and General Commander of Inner-Austria, Karlstadt and Warasdin. Thus he was responsible for the organization of the Military Frontier and the military supply. For this service, he was promoted to Feldmarschall (18 April 1744). In May 1749 he was relieved of his duties at his own demand.

== Battle of Rossbach ==
In the following years, he lived quietly in the Archduchy of Austria. After the outbreak of the Seven Years' War (1756–1763), in the spring of 1757, Joseph was appointed Commander of the Imperial Army, with orders to advance against King Frederick II of Prussia. Together with a French Corps, the Imperial Army was defeated in the Battle of Rossbach (5 November 1757). Joseph, shamed by the defeat, decided to renounce all military functions. In the evaluation by later historians the prince was nearly always blamed for the defeat, although he could hardly have changed the outcome of the fight, because of the catastrophic condition of the Imperial Army and the ineffectiveness of the French troops. Rather symbolic was the appointment to the post of Field Marshal of the Imperial Army (9 November 1785), with which the military career of Joseph ended. He died shortly after.

== Personal life ==
Jospeh's wife: Maria Anna Vittoria of Savoy

Joseph maintained for most of his life very good relations with the Habsburg family. In 1739 the Emperor Charles VI appointed him Knight of the Order of the Golden Fleece, the dynastic order of the Habsburgs.

On 13 March 1741 he represented King August III of Poland as godfather of the young Archduke Joseph, the son of the Empress Maria Theresa. This illustrates how close he stood to the new Empress, whose close friend he was to remain the rest of his life.

On 17 April 1738 Joseph married in Paris to Princess Maria Anna Victoria of Savoy, niece and sole heiress of the enormous fortune of the deceased Prince Eugene of Savoy. She was also sixteen years older than he was. Thanks to this union, Joseph came into the possession of large estates and assets. The marriage, however, was unhappy, and in 1752 they separated, but never formalized the divorce.

The prince earned a reputation as a patron, but also as a spendthrift. He spent most time at his castle in Vienna, but when his relatives the Dukes of Saxe-Hildburghausen were heavily indebted, he became by order of the Holy Roman Emperor Joseph II in 1769 manager of the Duchy, in order to avoid the bankruptcy of Saxe-Hildburghausen. His grandnephew, Duke Ernst Frederick III, was incapacitated to rule. When he died (1780) he left a young heir, the 17-year-old prince Frederick, over whom Joseph took on the role of prince-regent, which he retained until his own death, aged 84.

== Death ==
Prince Joseph died on 4 January 1787 in Hildburghausen, aged 84.
