= Louis Frederick =

Louis Frederick may refer to:

- Louis Frederick I of Schwarzburg-Rudolstadt (1667–1718)
- Louis Frederick II of Schwarzburg-Rudolstadt (1767–1807)
- Louis Frederick of Saxe-Hildburghausen (1710–1759)
- Louis Frederick, Duke of Württemberg-Montbéliard (1586–1631)
