= Ernest Frederick I =

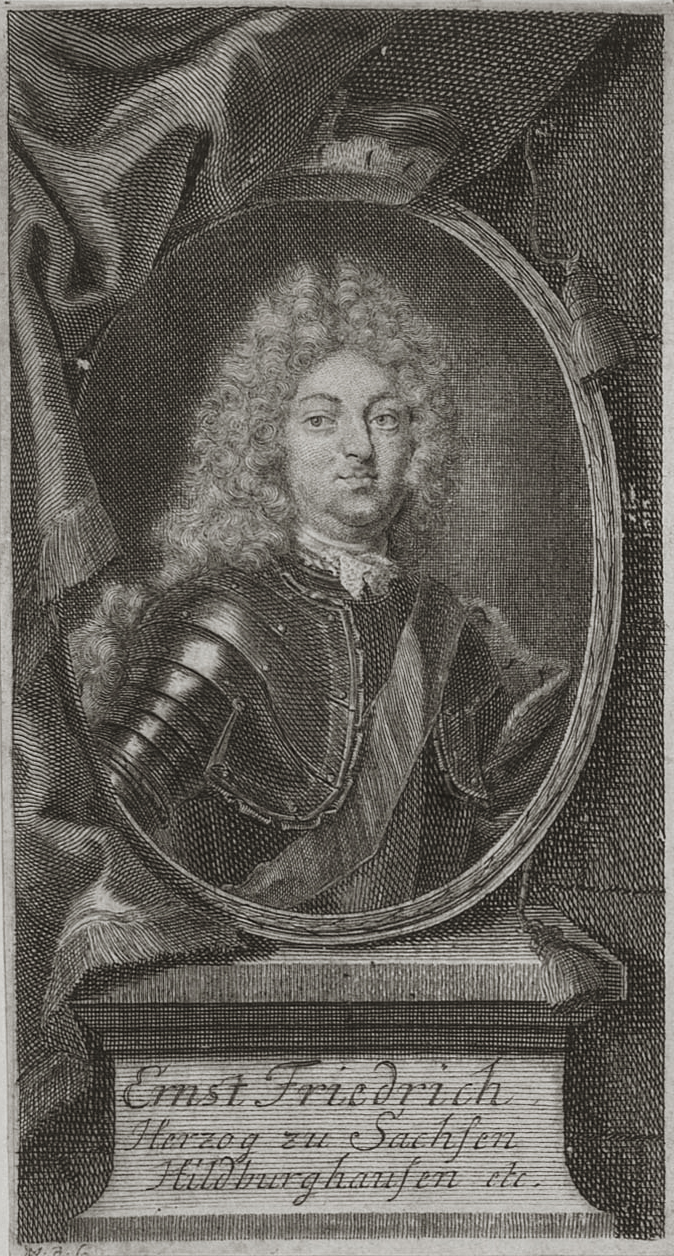
- Engraving c. 1700–1724

Duke of Saxe-Hildburghausen
- Reign: 17 October 1715– 9 March 1724
- Predecessor: Ernest
- Successor: Ernest Frederick II
- Born: 21 August 1681; Gotha
- Died: 9 March 1724 (aged 42); Hildburghausen
- Spouse: Countess Sophia Albertine of Erbach-Erbach
- Issue among others...: Ernest Frederick II; Prince Ludwig Frederick; Elisabeth Albertine, Princess of Mirow
- House: Saxe-Hildburghausen
- Father: Ernest, Duke of Saxe-Hildburghausen
- Mother: Countess Sophie Henriette of Waldeck
- Religion: Lutheranism

Ernest Frederick I (21 August 1681 in Gotha – 9 March 1724 in Hildburghausen), was a duke of Saxe-Hildburghausen.

== Early life ==
He was the eldest son of Ernest, Duke of Saxe-Hildburghausen and Countess Sophie Henriette of Waldeck.

During his youth he served on the Netherlands in the imperial military army, during which he was wounded in the Spanish Succession War at Höchstädt.

== Dukedom ==
In 1715 he left the Army after the death of his father, and assumed the government of the duchy of Saxe-Hildburghausen. He wanted, like many German princes, to repeat the splendor of the court of the King Louis XIV of France in his own duchy; but this was the cause of his financial ruin.

Constantly in need of money, he levied taxes and sold towns. Among them was the county of Cuylenburg, the dowry of his wife. The county was sold in 1720 to the General States, not for the repayment of the debts but to build in his palace a garden connected with a channel. Likewise, in 1723 the office was finally sold to the duchy of Saxe-Meiningen. But the sale, without the assent of his wife was illegal, and this led to a war with Saxe-Meiningen. The county was occupied with troops of both duchies and at the end of the war all of the county was devastated and ruined.

Because of his intolerable fiscal charges, in 1717 an open revolt developed in the duchy.

== Marriage and issue ==
In Erbach on 4 February 1704, Ernest Frederick married Countess Sophia Albertine of Erbach-Erbach. They had fourteen children:

1. Ernest Louis Hollandinus (b. Hildburghausen, 24 November 1704 – d. Hildburghausen, 26 November 1704) died young.
2. Sophie Amalie Elisabeth (b. Hildburghausen, 5 October 1705 – d. Hildburghausen, 28 February 1708) died in childhood.
3. Ernest Louis (b. Hildburghausen, 6 February 1707 – d. Hildburghausen, 17 April 1707) died in infancy.
4. Ernest Frederick II, Duke of Saxe-Hildburghausen (b. Hildburghausen, 17 December 1707 – d. Hildburghausen, 13 August 1745).
5. Frederick August (b. Hildburghausen, 8 May 1709 – d. Hildburghausen, 4 March 1710)died in infancy.
6. Louis Frederick (b. Hildburghausen, 11 September 1710 – d. Nimwegen, 10 June 1759), married on 4 May 1749 to Christine Luise von Holstein-Plön. This marriage was childless.
7. Stillborn daughter (Hildburghausen, 2 August 1711).
8. Stillborn daughter (Hildburghausen, 24 August 1712).
9. Elisabeth Albertine (b. Hildburghausen, 3 August 1713 – d. Neustrelitz, 29 June 1761), married on 5 May 1735 to Duke Charles Louis Frederick of Mecklenburg, Herr of Mirow.
10. Emanuel Frederick Charles (b. Hildburghausen, 26 March 1715 – d. Hildburghausen, 29 June 1718) died in childhood.
11. Elisabeth Sophie (b. Hildburghausen, 13 September 1717 – d. Hildburghausen, 14 October 1717) died in infancy.
12. Stillborn daughter (Hildburghausen, 17 March 1719).
13. George Frederick William (b. Hildburghausen, 15 July 1720 – d. Hildburghausen, 10 April 1721) died young.
14. Stillborn son (Hildburghausen, 15 December 1721).

Preceded by Ernest	Duke of Saxe-Hildburghausen; 1715–1724	Succeeded by Ernest Frederick II
