= Louise of Mecklenburg-Strelitz =

Queen of Prussia from 1797 to 1810

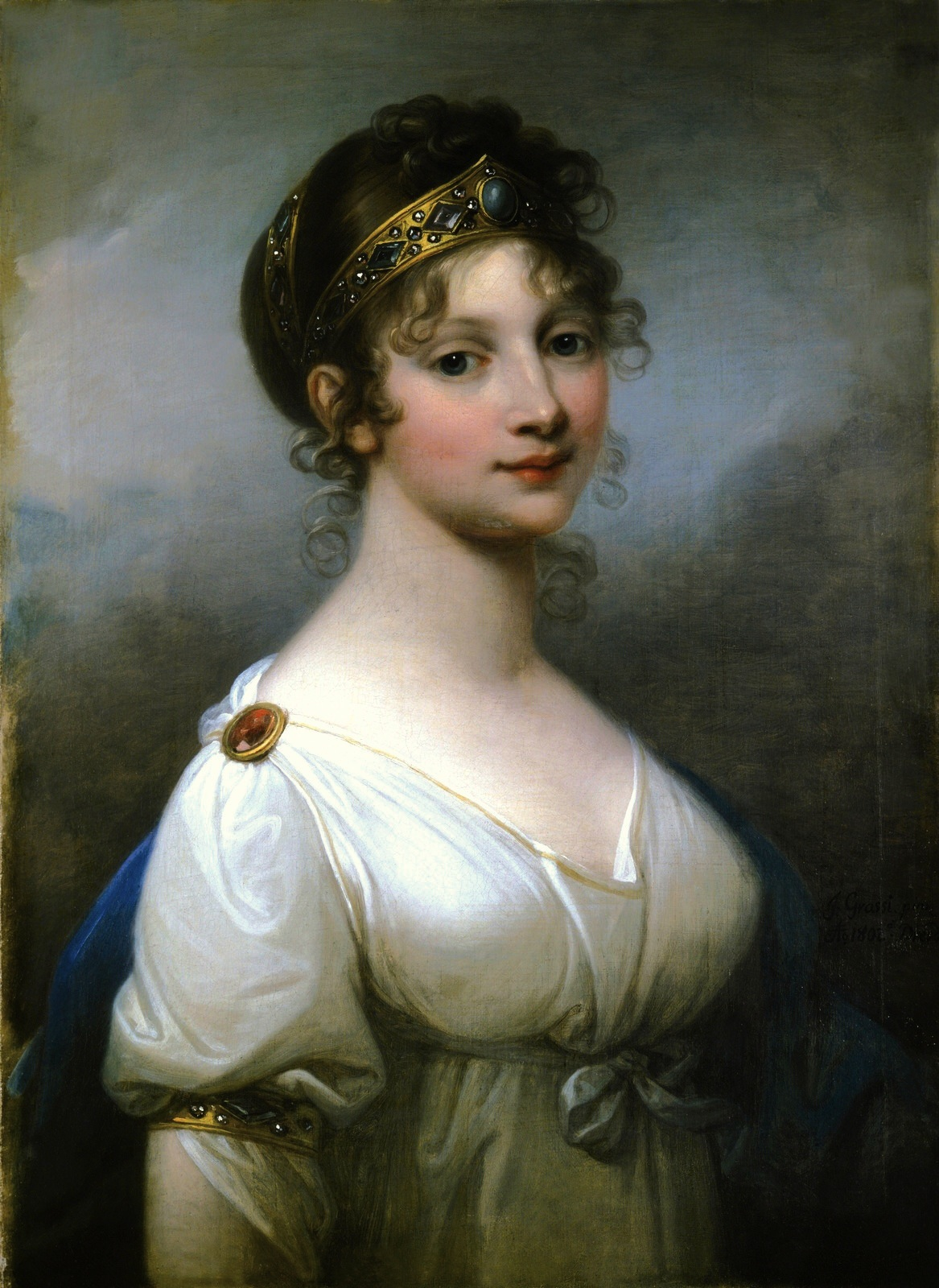
- Portrait by Josef Grassi, 1802

Queen consort of Prussia
- Tenure: 16 November 1797 – 19 July 1810

Electress consort of Brandenburg
- Tenure: 16 November 1797 – 6 August 1806
- Born: 10 March 1776; Hanover, Electorate of Hanover, Holy Roman Empire
- Died: 19 July 1810 (aged 34); Schloss Hohenzieritz, Kingdom of Prussia
- Burial: Mausoleum at Charlottenburg Palace
- Spouse: Frederick William III of Prussia (m. 1793)
- Issue: Frederick William IV, King of Prussia; Wilhelm I, German Emperor; Charlotte, Empress of Russia; Princess Frederica; Prince Charles; Alexandrine, Grand Duchess of Mecklenburg-Schwerin; Prince Ferdinand; Princess Louise; Prince Albert
Names
- Luise Auguste Wilhelmine Amalie
- House: Mecklenburg-Strelitz
- Father: Charles II, Grand Duke of Mecklenburg-Strelitz
- Mother: Princess Friederike of Hesse-Darmstadt
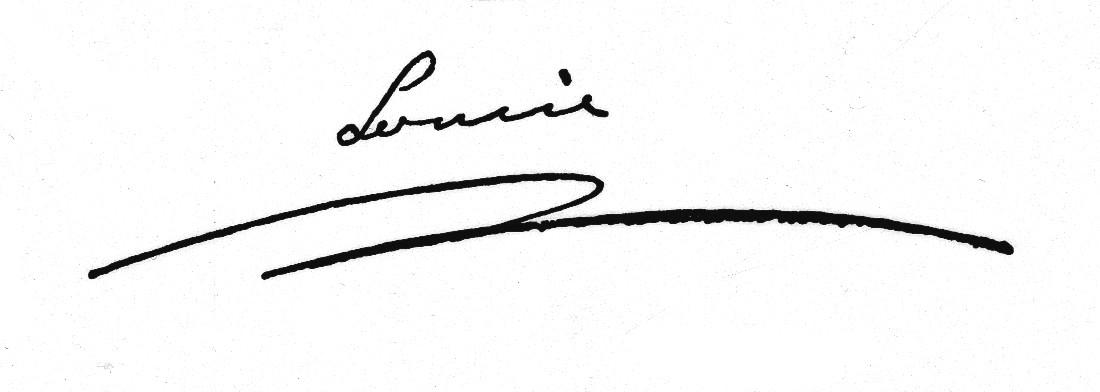
- Signature

Louise of Mecklenburg-Strelitz (Luise Auguste Wilhelmine Amalie; 10 March 1776 – 19 July 1810) was Queen of Prussia as the wife of King Frederick William III. The couple's happy, though short-lived, marriage produced nine children, including the future monarchs Frederick William IV of Prussia and William I, German Emperor.

Her father, Prince Charles of Mecklenburg-Strelitz, was field-marshal of the household brigade in Hanover. Her mother was a princess of Hesse-Darmstadt. In 1793 Louise met at Frankfort the crown prince of Prussia, afterwards King Frederick William III., who was so fascinated by her beauty, and by the nobleness of her character, that he asked her to become his wife. They were married on the 24 December. After the battle of Jena she went with her husband to Königsberg, and when the battles of Eylau and Friedland had placed Prussia absolutely at the mercy of France, she made a personal appeal to Napoleon at his headquarters in Tilsit, but without success. Early in 1808 she accompanied the king from Memel to Königsberg, whence, towards the end of the year, she visited St Petersburg, returning to Berlin on 23 December 1809. During the war Napoleon attempted to destroy the queen’s reputation, but the only effect of his charges in Prussia was to make her more deeply beloved. On 19 July 1810 she died in her husband’s arms, while visiting her father in Strelitz.

Her early death at the age of thirty-four "preserved her youth in the memory of posterity", and caused Napoleon to reportedly remark that the king "has lost his best minister". The Order of Louise was founded by her grieving husband four years later as a female counterpart to the Iron Cross. In 1880 a statue of Queen Louise was erected in the Tiergarten at Berlin. In the 1920s, conservative and nationalist German women founded the Queen Louise League.

== Early life (1776–1793) ==
Duchess Luise Auguste Wilhelmine Amalie of Mecklenburg-Strelitz ("Louise" in English) was born on 10 March 1776 in a one-storey villa, (Note: The same residence where the lover of Sophia Dorothea of Celle (wife of George I of Great Britain) was murdered and entombed) just outside the capital in Hanover. She was the fourth daughter and sixth child of Duke Charles of Mecklenburg-Strelitz and his wife Princess Friederike of Hesse-Darmstadt. Her father Charles was a brother of Queen Charlotte and her mother Friederike was a granddaughter of Louis VIII, Landgrave of Hesse-Darmstadt. Her maternal grandmother, Princess Maria Louise of Hesse-Darmstadt, and her paternal first-cousin Princess Augusta Sophia of the United Kingdom served as sponsors at her baptism; her second given name came from Princess Augusta Sophia.

At the time of her birth, Louise's father was not yet the ruler of Mecklenburg-Strelitz (he would not succeed his brother as duke until 1794), and consequently she was not born in a court, but rather in a less formal home. Charles was field marshal of the household brigade in Hanover, and soon after Louise's birth he was made Governor-General of that territory by his brother-in-law George III, Elector of Hanover (husband of his sister, Queen Charlotte). The family subsequently moved to Leineschloss, the residence of Hanoverian kings, though during the summer they usually lived at Herrenhausen.

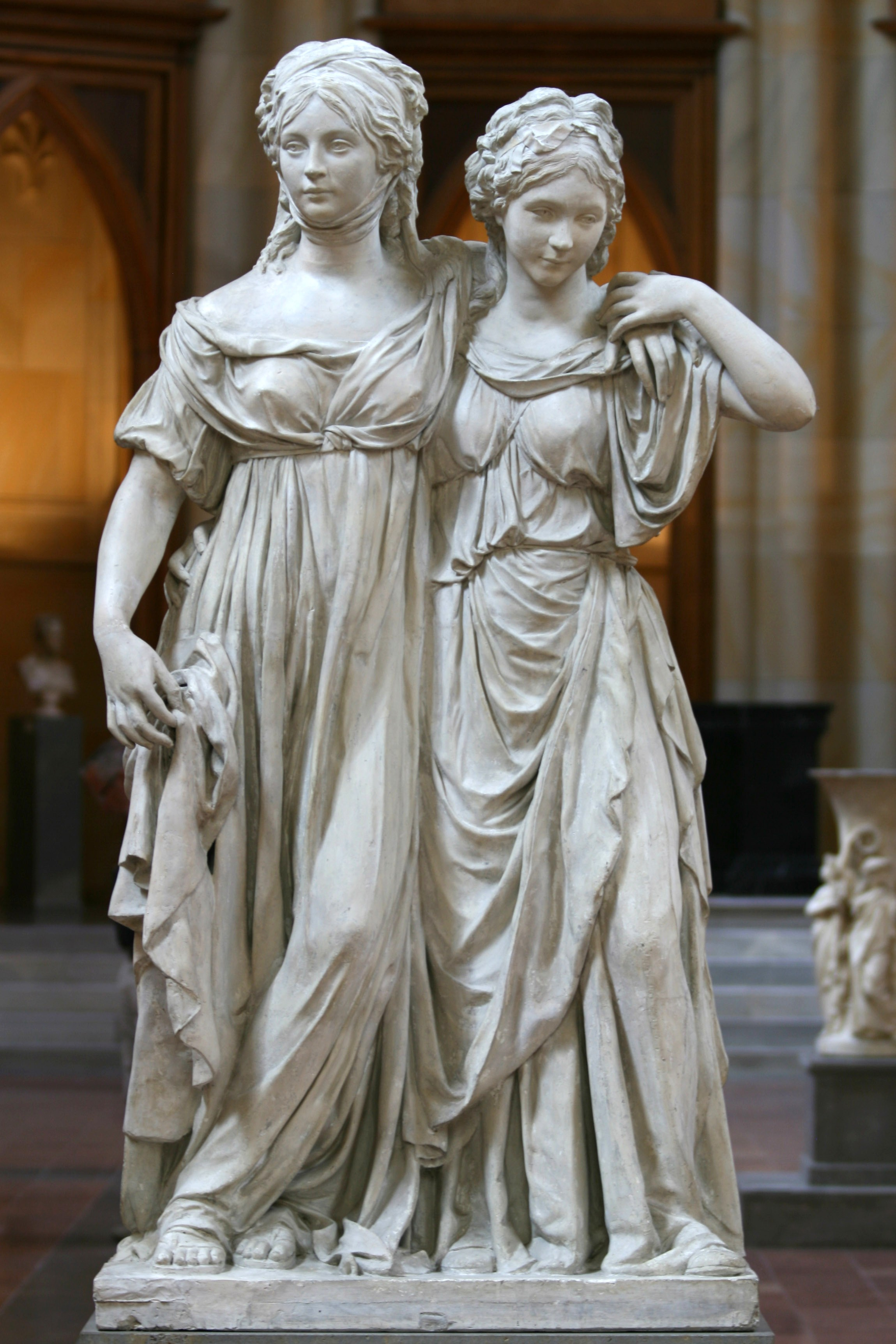
The famous Princesses Monument statue of Louise (left), with her sister Frederica of Mecklenburg-Strelitz by Johann Gottfried Schadow. The statue was initially deemed too erotic, and was consequently closed to public viewing.

Louise was particularly close to her sister Frederica, who was two years younger, as well as with their only brother George. Louise and her siblings were under the care of their governess Fräulein von Wolzogen. The poet Johann Wolfgang von Goethe described Luise and Friederike of Mecklenburg-Strelitz as “heavenly visions, whose impression upon me will never be effaced”. When Louise was only six years old, her mother died in childbirth, leaving a permanent mark on the young duchess. She would often give away pocket change to other children who experienced similar losses, stating "she is like me, she has no mother". After Duchess Friederike's death, the family left Leineschloss for Herrenhausen, sometimes called a "miniature Versailles". Duke Charles remarried two years later to his first wife's younger sister Charlotte, producing a son, Charles. Louise and her aunt and new stepmother became close until Charlotte's early death the year after their marriage, also from childbirth complications. The twice widowed and grieving duke went to Darmstadt, where he gave the children into the care of his mother-in-law and Louise's grandmother, the widowed Princess Maria Louise.

=== Education ===
Marie Louise preferred to raise her grandchildren simply, and they made their own clothes. A new governess from Switzerland, Madame Gelieux, was appointed, giving the children lessons in French; as was common for royal and aristocratic children of the time, Louise became fluent and literate in the language, while neglecting her own native German. She received religious instruction from a clergyman of the Lutheran Church. Complementary to her lessons was an emphasis on charitable acts, and Louise would often accompany her governess when visiting the houses of the poor and needy. Louise was encouraged to give out as much as was in her means, although she often got into trouble with her grandmother for donating too much for charity. From the age of ten until her marriage at 17, Louise spent most of her time in the presence of her grandmother and governess, both well-educated and refined. When only nine years old, Louise was present when the poet Friedrich Schiller read from the first act of "Don Carlos" for the entertainment of the assembled court, thus sparking her love for German as a literary language, especially works of Schiller. Louise loved history and poetry, and not only enjoyed reading Schiller, but also came to like the works of Goethe, Paul, Herder and Shakespeare, as well as ancient Greek tragedies.

=== Appearance ===
Contemporary men and women described Louise as beautiful in face and noble in figure. She had large blue eyes that "glowed with feeling" and gave her "a peculiar charm." She had light hair with blonde locks and fair complexion with rosy cheeks. Her strong neck supported a face with high cheekbones, a narrow nose, a slight overbite and a barely noticeable double chin. She stood at 174 cm tall and had a shoe size of 41. A lady of her era commented that she always appeared "splendid" and "gentle" despite her large form and that no women matched her beauty even when compared "in single features."

A German magazine, based on a 2010 research of Louise's clothes, lists her proportions as follows: height 172–174 cm, shoulder height 140–143 cm, shoulder width 38 cm, underbust circumference 68–70 cm, bust circumference 76–80 cm, hand length 19.5 cm (glove size 8.5), shoe size 41.

== Crown Princess of Prussia (1793–1797) ==
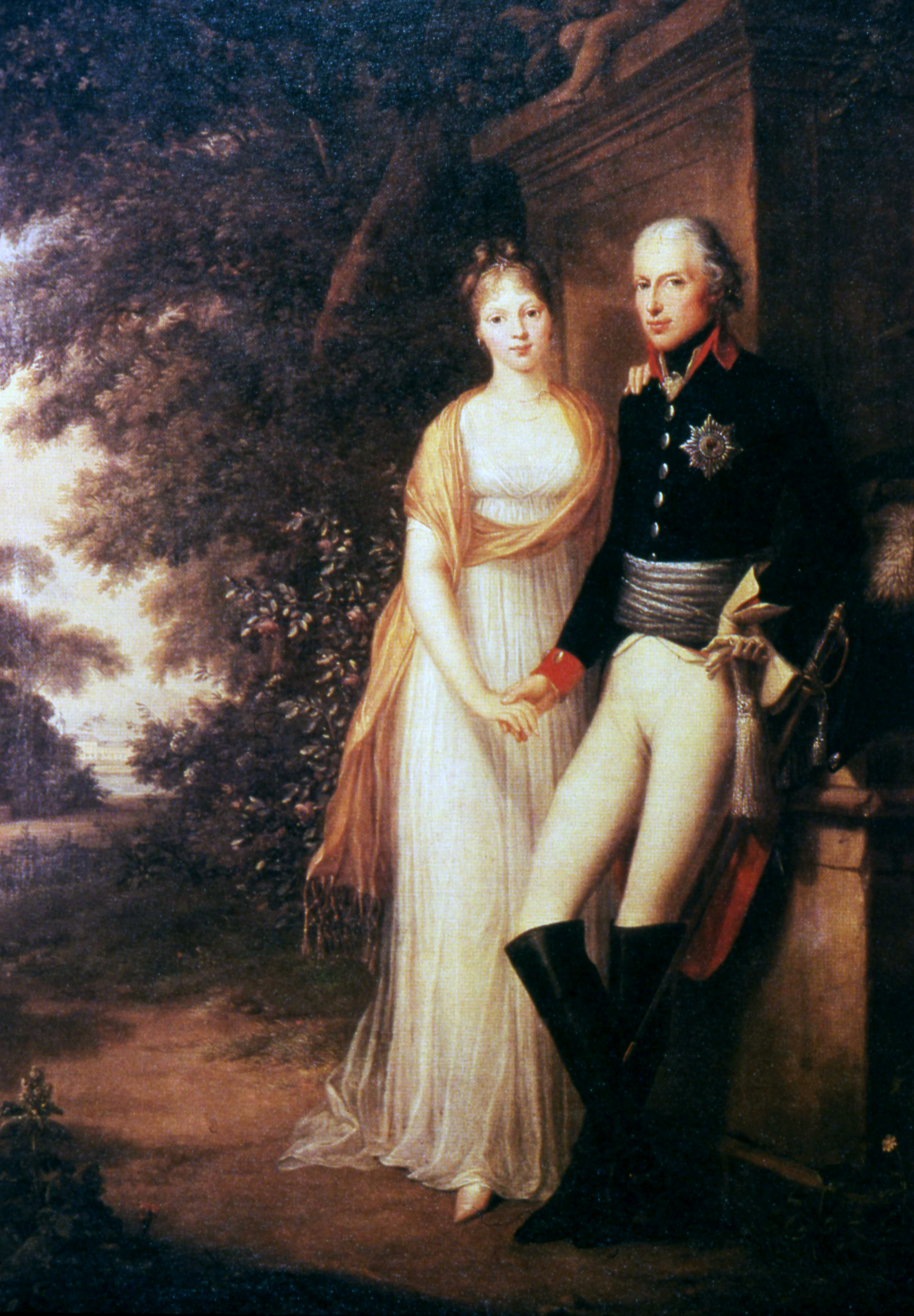
Louise and Frederick William, 1794 – a year after their marriage

In 1793, Marie Louise took the two youngest duchesses with her to Frankfurt, where she paid her respects to king Frederick William II of Prussia. Louise's uncle, the Duke of Mecklenburg-Strelitz, hoped to strengthen ties between his house and Prussia. Consequently, on one evening carefully planned by the duke, seventeen-year-old Louise met the king's son and heir, Crown Prince Frederick William. The crown prince was twenty-three, serious-minded, and religious. She made such a charming impression on Frederick William that he immediately made his choice, desiring to marry her. Frederica caught the eye of his younger brother Prince Louis Charles, and the two families began planning a double betrothal, celebrating a month later, on 24 April 1793 in Darmstadt. Frederick and Louise were subsequently married on 24 December that same year, with Louis and Frederica marrying two days later.

In the events leading up to her marriage, Louise's arrival in Berlin, the Prussian capital, caused quite a sensation, and she was greeted with a grand reception by the city's joyful citizens. When she broke protocol and stopped to pick up and kiss a child, Prussian writer Friedrich de la Motte Fouqué remarked that "The arrival of the angelic Princess spreads over these days a noble splendor. All hearts go out to meet her, and her grace and goodness leaves no one unblessed." Another wrote "The more perfectly one becomes acquainted with the Princess the more one is captivated by the inner nobility, and the angelic goodness of her heart."

Louise's father-in-law King Frederick William II gave the couple Charlottenburg Palace, but the crown prince and his new wife preferred to live at Paretz Palace, just outside Potsdam, where Louise kept herself busy with household affairs. Paretz was far from the bustle of court, as the couple were most content in the "rural retirement" of a country life. The marriage was happy, and Louise was well-beloved by the king, who called her "the princess of princesses" and gave her Oranienburg Palace. The crown princess saw it as her duty to support her husband in all his pursuits, and the couple enjoyed singing together and reading from Shakespeare and Goethe. Louise soon became pregnant, giving birth to a stillborn girl on 1 October 1794 at the age of eighteen. Nine healthy children would follow in quick succession, though two died in childhood: Crown Prince Frederick William (1795), Prince William (1797), Princess Charlotte (1798), Princess Frederica (1799), Prince Charles (1801), Princess Alexandrine (1803), Prince Ferdinand (1804), Princess Louise (1808), and Prince Albert (1809). The couple also used the Crown Prince's Palace in the capital.

Louise's charitable giving continued throughout her life, and on one occasion, while attending a harvest festival, she purchased presents and distributed them to local children. On her first birthday after her marriage in Berlin, when King Frederick William II asked his daughter-in-law what she desired for a present, Louise replied she wanted a handful of money to let the city's people share her joy; he smilingly gave her a large quantity for the task.

== Queen consort of Prussia (1797–1810) ==
On 16 November 1797, her husband succeeded to the throne of Prussia as King Frederick William III after the death of his father. Louise wrote to her grandmother, "I am now queen, and what rejoices me most is the hope that now I need no longer count my benefactions so carefully." The couple had to abandon their solitude at Paretz and begin living under the restraints of a royal court. They began a tour of the country's eastern provinces for two purposes: the king wanted to acquaint himself with their new subjects, and despite the unusualness of a consort accompanying the king further than the capital, Frederick William wanted to introduce the queen as well to their people. Louise was received everywhere with festivities. For the first time in Prussian history, the queen emerged as a celebrated public personality in her own right, as she occupied a much more prominent role than her predecessors. Louise's presence on her husband's eastern journey was a break from the traditional role of the consort – importantly however the queen's power and enduring legacy did not stem from holding a separate court and policy than her husband's, but rather the opposite: she subordinated her formidable intelligence and skill for her husband's sole advantage. She also became a fashion icon, for instance starting a trend by wearing a neckerchief to keep from getting ill.

After her husband's accession, Louise developed many ties to senior ministers and became a powerful figure within the government as she began to command universal respect and affection. The queen went out of her way to stay informed about political developments at court, and from the very beginning of his reign the new king consulted Louise on matters of state. Frederick William was hesitant and cautious, and hated war, stating in 1798, "I abhor war and... know of nothing greater on earth than the preservation of peace and tranquility as the only system suited to the happiness of human kind". In keeping with the later foreign policy of his father's, Frederick William favored neutrality during the early years of the conflict with the revolutionary French First Republic, which evolved into the Napoleonic Wars (1803–15); he refused the various pressures to pick a side in the War of the Second Coalition. Louise supported this view, warning that if Prussia were to side with the coalition powers of Austria, Great Britain, and Russia, it would lead to dependence on the latter power for military support. She foresaw that because Prussia was by far the weakest of the great powers, and it would not have been able to ensure it benefited from the results of such an alliance. French aggression caused the king to eventually consider entering the wars, but his indecision prevented him from choosing a side, either France or the coalition powers. He consulted the many differing opinions of Queen Louise and his ministers, and was eventually compelled into an alliance with Napoleon, who was recently victorious from the Battle of Austerlitz (1805).

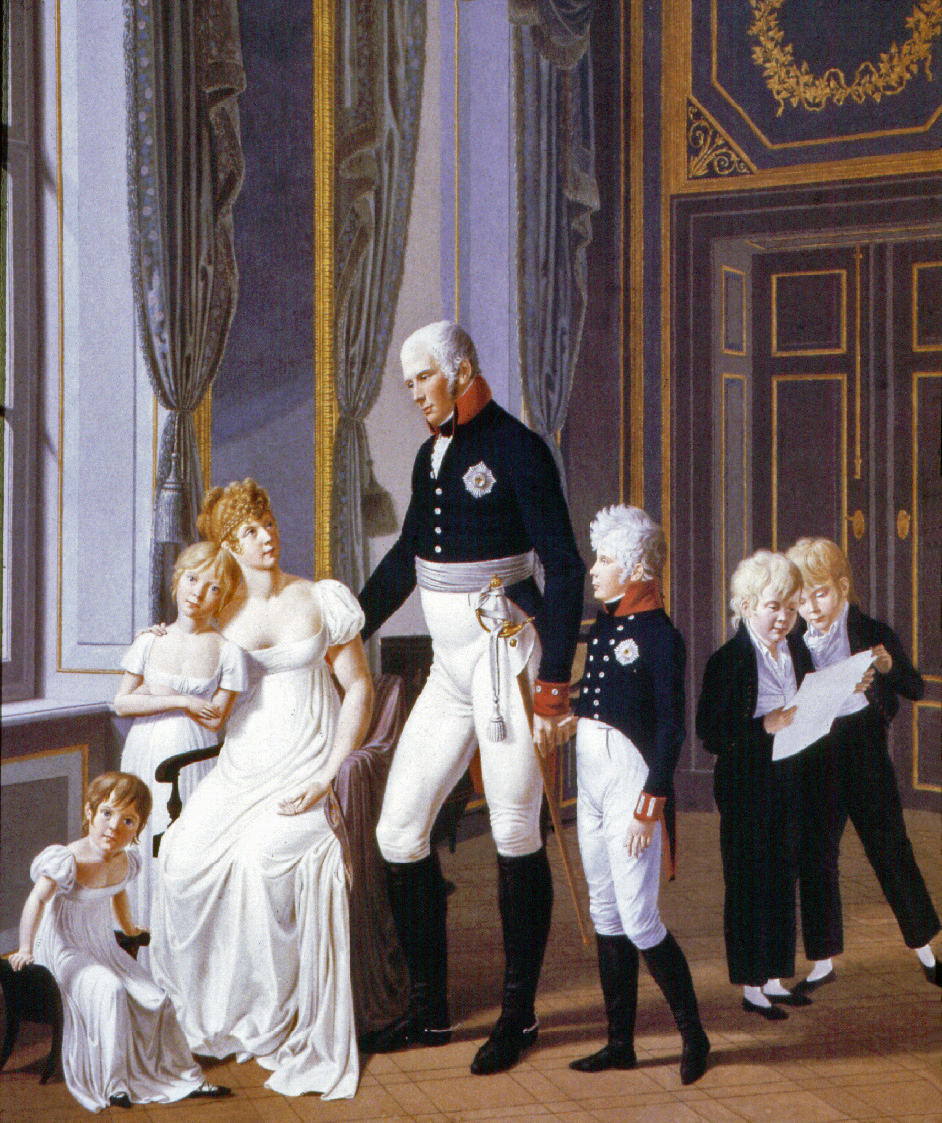
Queen Louise with her husband and children, c. 1806

Baron vom Stein, a member of the bureaucracy, having abhorred the country's former neutrality, sought to reform the organization of the government from favor-based cronyism into a responsible ministerial government. He prepared a document for the king detailing in strong language what administrative reforms were needed, such as establishing clearer lines of responsibility among ministers; this work however never reached Frederick William, as Stein passed it first to General Ernst von Rüchel, who in turn passed it onto the queen in the spring of 1806. Though Louise agreed with its contents, she thought it "too violent and passionate" for the king, and consequently helped suppress it.

=== War with France ===
Among the king's advisers, members of his family, such as the queen (an open advocate of war) and Prince Louis Ferdinand, led the militaristic faction in favor of war against France; those against neutrality but in favor of reform were led by Baron vom Stein and Karl August von Hardenberg. Knowing the temperament of the king, Hardenberg appealed directly to the queen for desired reform – wisely as it turned out, as Frederick William viewed the demands to remove his trusted advisers in the Kabinett as a "mutiny" similar to the Fronde.

Though Prussia had not fought in a war since 1795, its military leaders confidently expected that they could win against Napoleon's troops. After a small incident concerning an anti-French pamphlet occurred, King Frederick William was finally pressured by his wife and family to break off his uneasy peace and enter the war against the French emperor. The Prussian Army began mobilizing, culminating in the October 1806 Battle of Jena-Auerstedt, which was a disaster for Prussia, as the ability of its armed forces to continue the war were effectively wiped out. The king and queen had accompanied their troops into battle at Jena (with Louise apparently dressed "like an Amazon"), but had to flee from French troops.

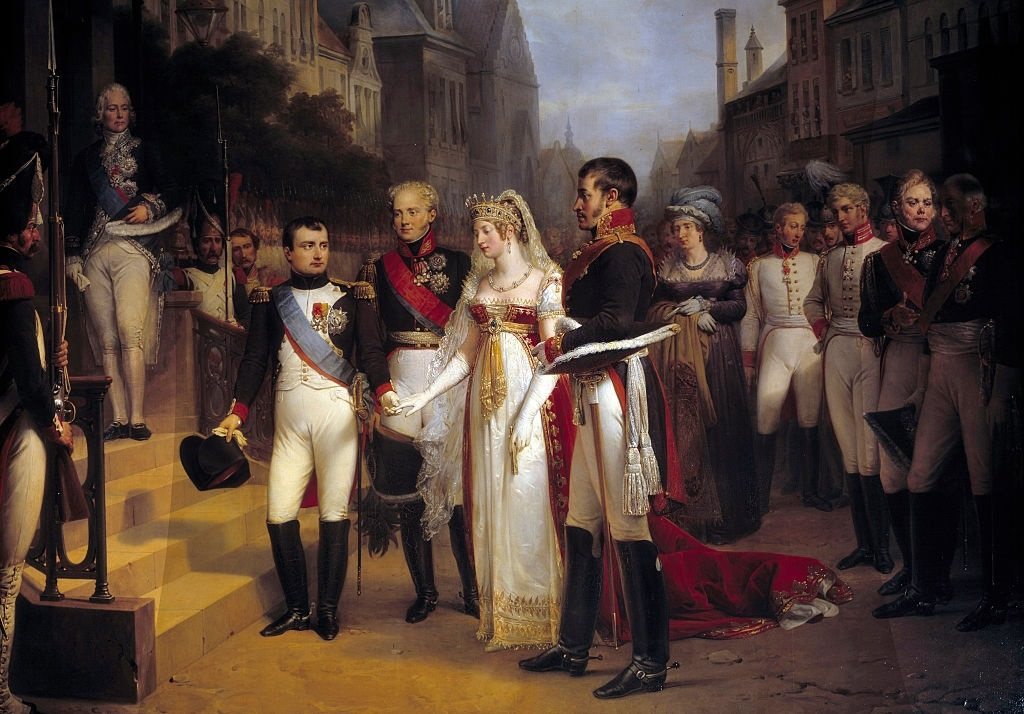
Napoleon, Alexander I of Russia, Queen Louise, and Frederick William in Tilsit

Napoleon himself occupied Berlin, causing the king, queen and the rest of the royal family to flee, despite Louise's illness, in the dead of winter to Memel in the easternmost part of the kingdom. On the journey there, there was no food or clean water, and the king and queen were forced to share the same sleeping arrangements in "one of the wretched barns they call houses", according to one witness traveling with them.

After various events took place, (Note: Initially after Jena, Napoleon was ready to offer peace terms, but Frederick William ignored the majority of his counselors and decided to continue the war. The Battle of Eylau (February 1807) was a small victory against the French, but again the king refused to enter peace negotiations, incorrectly believing that incoming Russian troops would stop the French. The Battle of Friedland led to separate French negotiations with Russia and Prussia.) Napoleon demanded, from a highly superior position, peace terms in what was to be called the Peace of Tilsit (1807). In the midst of these negotiations, the emperor agreed to keep half of Prussia intact. The men were joined by Queen Louise; Frederick William had sent for his wife, then pregnant with her daughter Princess Louise, to beg for a better settlement for Prussia, with Louise advising her husband, "For God's sake no shameful peace...[Prussia] should at least not go down without honor." As the king felt that her presence might put Napoleon in a "more relaxed mood"; Louise reluctantly agreed to meet the emperor at Tilsit, but only to save Prussia. Napoleon had previously attempted to destroy her reputation by questioning Louise's marital fidelity, but the queen met him anyway, attempting to use her beauty and charm to flatter him into more favorable terms. Formerly Louise had regularly referred to him as "the Monster", but nevertheless made a request for a private interview with the emperor, whereon she threw herself at his feet; though he was impressed by her grace and determination, Napoleon refused to make any concessions, writing back to his wife Empress Joséphine that Louise "is really charming and full of coquettishness toward me. But don't be jealous...it would cost me too dearly to play the gallant." Napoleon's attempts to destroy Louise's reputation failed however, and they only made her more beloved in Prussia. Yet, Napoleon called Louise "an exquisite woman," telling Tsar Alexander that "instead of depriving her of a crown, one is tempted to lay one at her feet." Queen Louise's efforts to protect her adopted country from French aggression secured for her the admiration of future generations.

=== Remaining years ===
Harsh restrictions were imposed on Prussia, such as a massive indemnity of one hundred and twenty million francs and the quartering of troops. At the time, one hundred and twenty million francs was equivalent to the entire yearly budget of Prussia. As the perceived symbol of Prussia's former grandeur and pride, the French occupation of Prussia had a particularly devastating effect upon Louise, as the queen endured personal insults – Napoleon himself gave her a backhanded compliment when he called her "the only real man in Prussia". The queen recognized that her adopted country depended on her for moral strength, and as a consequence Louise regained her old sense of optimism, often taking time to prepare their eldest son for his future role as king. In the following few years Louise supported the reforming efforts of government carried out by Stein and Hardenberg, as well as those of Gerhard von Scharnhorst and August Neidhardt von Gneisenau, to reorganize the army. After the disaster at Tilsit, Louise was instrumental in Stein's reappointment (the king had previously dismissed him), telling Frederick William "[Stein] is my last hope. A great heart, an encompassing mind, perhaps he knows remedies that are hidden to us."

By 1808 it was still considered unsafe to return to Berlin, and the royal family consequently spent the summer near Königsberg; Louise believed that the hard trials of her children's early lives would be good for them: "If they had been reared in luxury and prosperity they might think that so it must always be." In the winter of 1808, Tsar Alexander I invited the king and queen to St. Petersburg, where she was treated to sumptuously decorated rooms; "Nothing dazzles me anymore", she exclaimed on her return to Germany. Near the birth of her youngest child Princess Louise in 1809, Louise wrote to her father, "Gladly...the calamities which have befallen us have not forced their way into our wedded and home life, rather have strengthened the same, and made it even more precious to us." Louise was sick for much of that year, but returned with the king to Berlin near the end of it after an absence of three years; the queen arrived in a carriage accompanied by her two daughters Charlotte and Alexandrine and younger son Charles, and was greeted by her father at Charlottenburg Palace – the residence was ransacked however, as Napoleon and his commanders had stripped its rooms of paintings, statues, manuscripts, and antiquities. Returning to a much different Prussia than she left, a preacher observed that "our dear queen is far from joyful, but her seriousness has a quiet serenity... her eyes have lost their former sparkle, and one sees that they have wept much, and still weep".

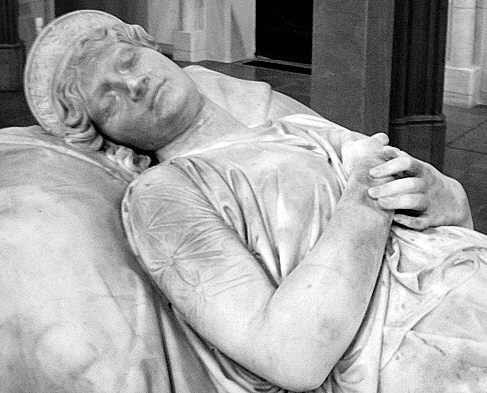
Louise's sarcophagus in the mausoleum of Charlottenburg Palace

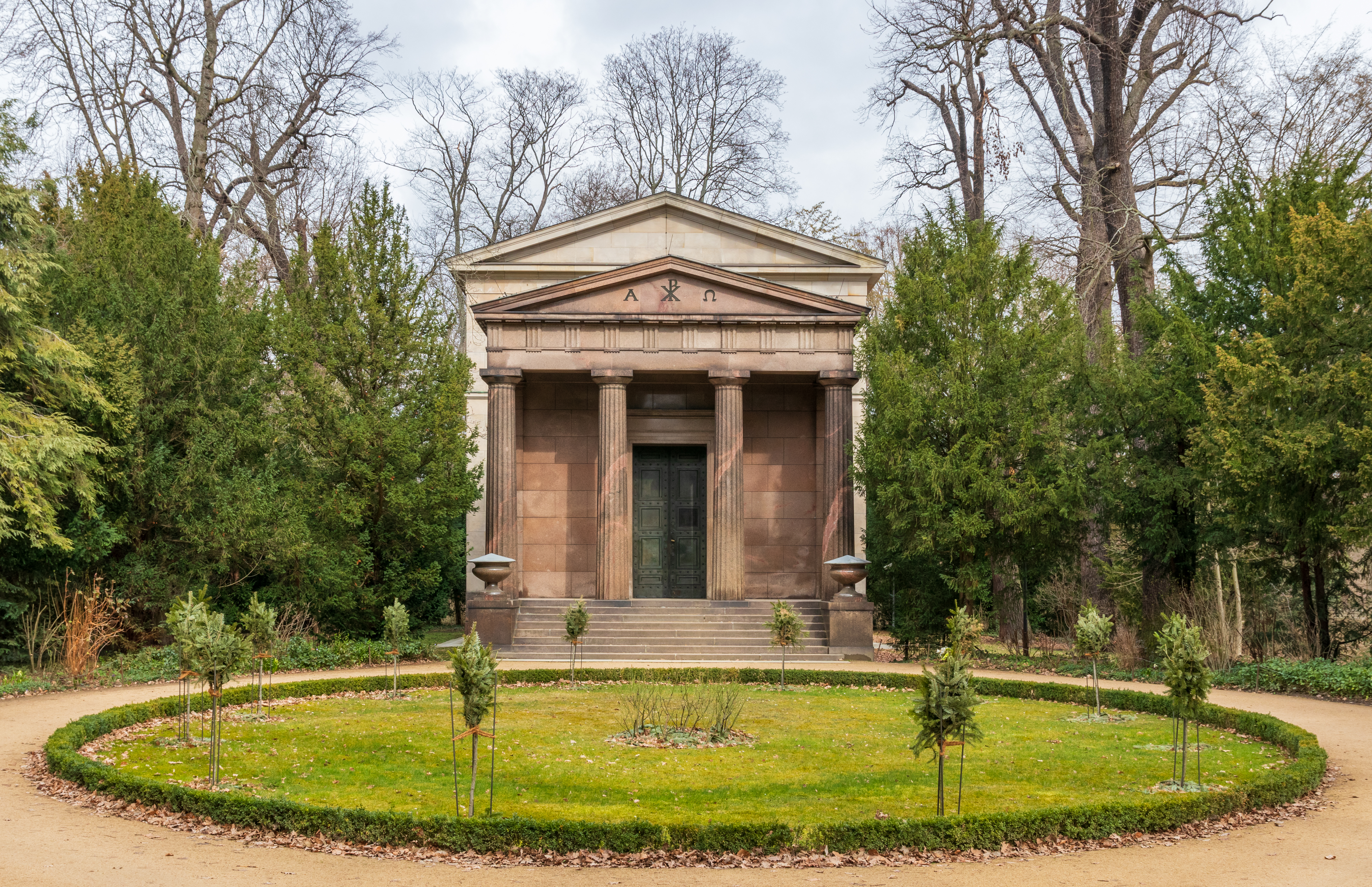
Royal Mausoleum at Park Charlottenburg, Berlin.

On 19 July 1810, while visiting her father in Strelitz, the queen died in her husband's arms from an unidentified illness. The queen's subjects attributed the French occupation as the cause of her early death. "Our saint is in heaven", exclaimed Prussian general Gebhard Leberecht von Blücher. Louise's untimely death left her husband alone during a period of great difficulty, as the Napoleonic Wars and need for reform continued. Louise was buried in the garden of Charlottenburg Palace, where a mausoleum, containing a fine recumbent statue by Christian Daniel Rauch, was built over her grave. Frederick William did not remarry until 1824, when he entered into a morganatic marriage with Countess Auguste von Harrach, explaining "Womanly companionship and sympathy have become necessary to me, therefore I must marry again." After his death on 7 June 1840, Frederick William was buried by her side.

== Legacy ==
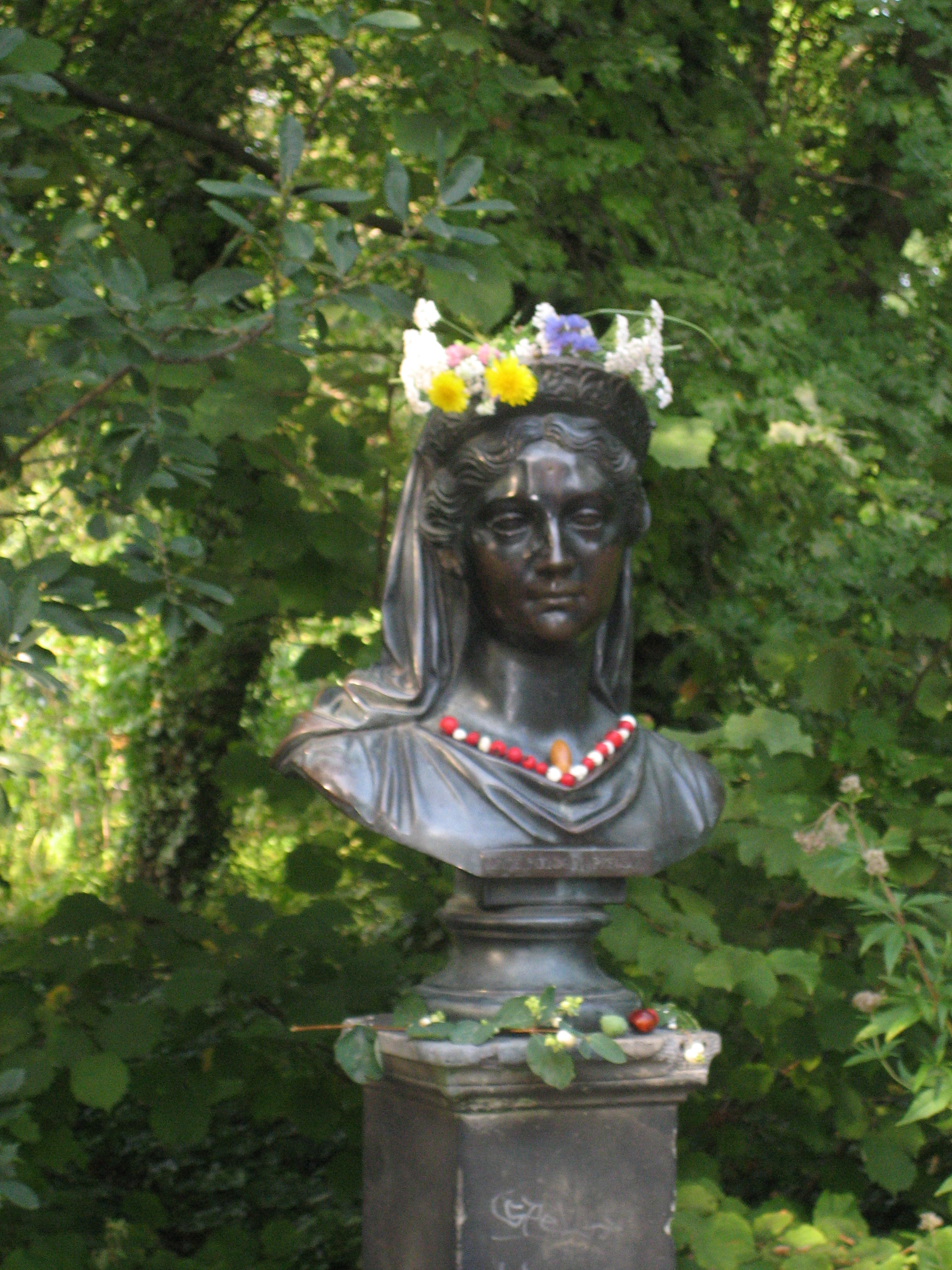
A statue of Queen Louise in the park of Charlottenburg, Berlin

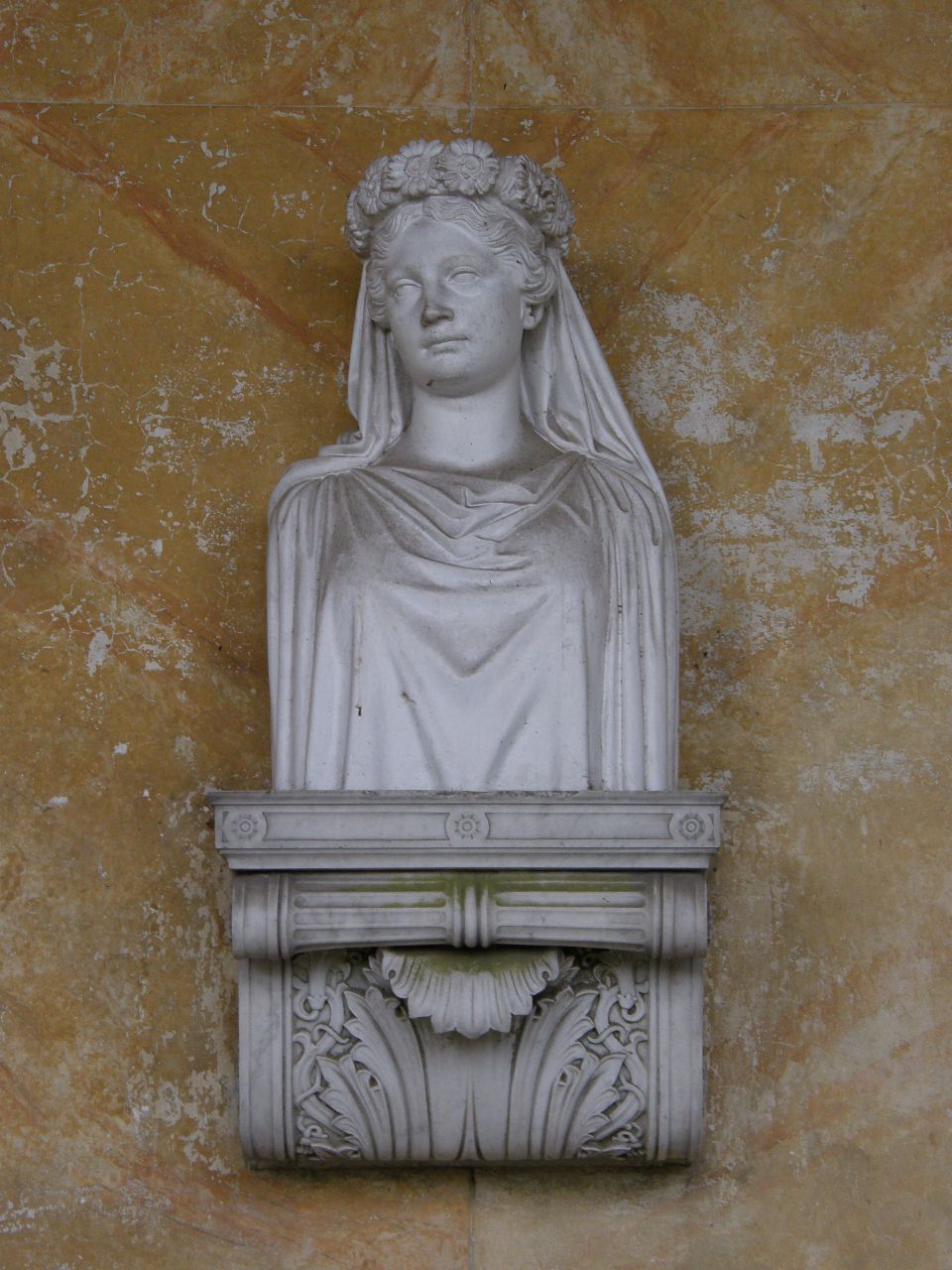
A bust of Queen Louise in the Queen Louise Memorial Temple on the Pfaueninsel in Wannsee, Berlin

Queen Louise was revered by her subjects as the "soul of national virtue", and some historians have written that Louise was "Prussian nationalism personified." According to Christopher Clark, Louise was "a female celebrity who in the mind of the public combined virtue, modesty, and sovereign grace with kindness and sex appeal, and whose early death in 1810 at the age of only thirty-four preserved her youth in the memory of posterity." Her reputation as a loving and loyal supporter of her husband became crucial to her enduring legacy; the cult that eventually surrounded Louise became associated with the "ideal" feminine attributes: prettiness, sweet nature, maternal kindness, and wifely virtue.

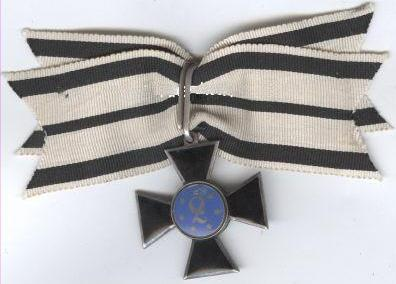
The Order of Louise, First Class

On the anniversary of her birth, in 1814, the widowed King Frederick William instituted the Order of Louise (Luisenorden) as a complementary decoration for the Iron Cross. Its purpose was to be given to those women who had made a significant contribution to the war effort against Napoleon, though it was subsequently awarded to future members of the House of Hohenzollern unrelated to the French emperor, such as her granddaughter-in-law, Empress Victoria of Germany, and her great-granddaughter, Queen Sophia of Greece. In 1880 a statue of Queen Louise was erected in the Tiergarten in Berlin.

Louise inspired the establishment of a conservative women's organization known as Königin-Luise-Bund, often shortened to Luisenbund ("Queen Louise League") in which her person achieved an almost cult-like status. The group's main purpose was to promote patriotic feelings among German women, and it emphasized the family and German morality. The Königin-Luise-Bund was active during the time of the Weimar Republic and the first years of Nazi Germany. Despite having actively supported the National Socialist movement since its early stages all through their accession to power in 1933, the Queen Louise League was nonetheless disbanded by the Nazis in 1934, as they viewed it as a hostile organization.

Luisenhospital in Aachen is named after Queen Louise. In East Prussia the Queen Louise Memorial Church, a Protestant church in Königsberg was built in 1901, but after WWII it was converted into a puppet theater once East Prussia became a part of the Soviet Union.

=== Popular culture ===
The character of Queen Louise was the popular subject of a number of films released in German cinema. These included Der Film von der Königin Luise (1912), Die elf schillschen Offiziere (1926), and Vivat – Königin Luise im Fichtelgebirge (2005), Luise – Königin der Herzen (2010 documentary). She was played by Mady Christians in the 1927 silent film Queen Louise, by Henny Porten in Louise, Queen of Prussia (1931), and by Ruth Leuwerik in the 1957 film Queen Louise.

She was also briefly portrayed in an extremely reverential manner in the 1945 propaganda film Kolberg.

Louise became the subject of a series of novels by 19th century German historical fiction writer Luise Mühlbach, which included Louisa of Prussia and her Times and Napoleon and the Queen of Prussia.

== Issue ==
By Frederick William III of Prussia (3 August 1770 – 7 June 1840); married on 24 December 1793.

Name	Birth	Death	Notes
Unnamed daughter	1 October 1794	1 October 1794	Stillborn.
Prince Friedrich Wilhelm, later Friedrich Wilhelm IV	15 October 1795	2 January 1861	married Princess Elisabeth Ludovika of Bavaria (1801–1873), no issue
Prince Wilhelm Friedrich Ludwig, later Wilhelm I	22 March 1797	9 March 1888	married Princess Augusta of Saxe-Weimar-Eisenach (1811–1890), had issue
Princess Friederike Luise Charlotte Wilhelmine	13 July 1798	1 November 1860	married Tsar Nicholas I of Russia, had issue including the future Alexander II of Russia
Princess Friederike	14 October 1799	30 March 1800	died in childhood
Prince Friedrich Karl Alexander	29 June 1801	21 January 1883	married Princess Marie of Saxe-Weimar-Eisenach and had issue.
Princess Friederike Wilhelmine Alexandrine Marie Helene	23 February 1803	21 April 1892	married Paul Friedrich, Grand Duke of Mecklenburg-Schwerin and had issue.
Prince Friedrich Jules Ferdinand Leopold	13 December 1804	1 April 1806	died of diphtheria in childhood.
Princess Luise Auguste Wilhelmine Amalie	1 February 1808	6 December 1870	married Prince Frederick of the Netherlands, had issue.
Prince Friedrich Heinrich Albrecht	4 October 1809	14 October 1872	married Princess Marianne of the Netherlands and had issue. Married secondly to Rosalie von Rauch, Countess of Hohenau, daughter of Gustav von Rauch, had issue.

== Ancestry ==
Ancestors of Louise of Mecklenburg-Strelitz

8. Adolphus Frederick II, Duke of Mecklenburg-Strelitz
4. Duke Charles Louis Frederick of Mecklenburg-Strelitz
9. Princess Christiane Emilie of Schwarzburg-Sondershausen
2. Charles II, Grand Duke of Mecklenburg-Strelitz
10. Ernest Frederick I, Duke of Saxe-Hildburghausen
5. Princess Elisabeth Albertine of Saxe-Hildburghausen
11. Countess Sophia Albertine of Erbach-Erbach
1. Louise of Mecklenburg-Strelitz
12. Louis VIII, Landgrave of Hesse-Darmstadt
6. Prince George William of Hesse-Darmstadt
13. Countess Charlotte of Hanau-Lichtenberg
3. Princess Friederike of Hesse-Darmstadt
14. Count Christian Karl Reinhard of Leiningen-Dagsburg-Falkenburg
7. Countess Maria Louise Albertine of Leiningen-Dagsburg-Falkenburg
15. Countess Katharina Polyxena of Solms-Rödelheim

== Notes ==
Louise of Mecklenburg-Strelitz House of Mecklenburg-Strelitz Born: 10 March 1776 Died: 19 July 1810
Royal titles
Preceded by Frederika Louisa of Hesse-Darmstadt	Queen consort of Prussia; 16 November 1797 – 19 July 1810	Vacant Title next held by Elisabeth Ludovika of Bavaria
