= Luisenhospital =

Hospital in Aachen, Germany

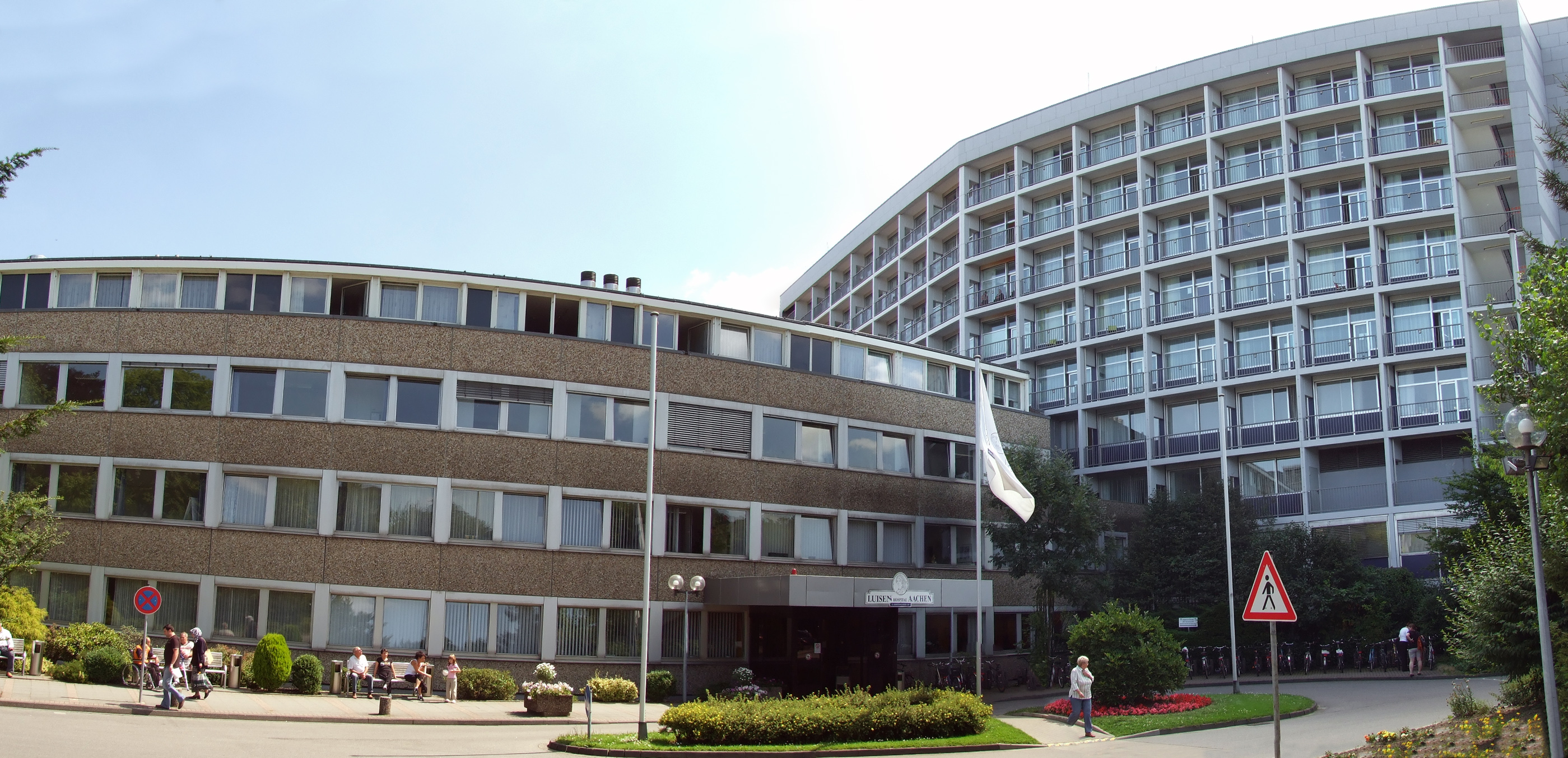
The Luisenhospital in 2008.

The Luisenhospital is a Protestant hospital in Aachen, Germany, with 378 planned beds, 12 specialist departments and 11 centers. The hospital, founded in 1867 with the support of the Aachen Association for the Promotion of Industriousness, was named after Queen Luise of Prussia.

== History ==
On 4 March 2024, police surrounded the hospital amid a possible hostage situation.
