= Saxe-Hildburghausen =

Former monarchy in Europe

Duchy of Saxe-Hildburghausen Herzogtum Sachsen-Hildburghausen (German)
- 1680–1826
- Top: Flag of Saxe-Hildburghausen (1680-1815); Bottom: Flag of Saxe-Hildburghausen (1815-1826) Coat of arms

- Saxony-Hildburghausen (around 1680)
- Status: State of the Holy Roman Empire (1680–1806); State of the Confederation of the Rhine (1806–1813); State of the German Confederation (1815–1826)
- Capital: Heldburg (to 1684); Hildburghausen (from 1684)
- Government: Duchy
- Duke
  - 1680–1715: Ernest (first)
  - 1780–1826: Frederick (last)
- Historical era: Early modern period
  - Partitioned from Saxe-Gotha: 1680
  - Reichsunmittelbarkeit: 1702
  - Passed to Saxe-Meiningen: 1826
Preceded by	Succeeded by
Saxe-Gotha	Saxe-Coburg and Gotha; Saxe-Meiningen

Saxe-Hildburghausen (German: Sachsen-Hildburghausen) was an Ernestine duchy and Imperial Estate of the Holy Roman Empire in the southern side of the present State of Thuringia in Germany. It existed from 1680 to 1826 but its name and borders are currently used by the District of Hildburghausen.

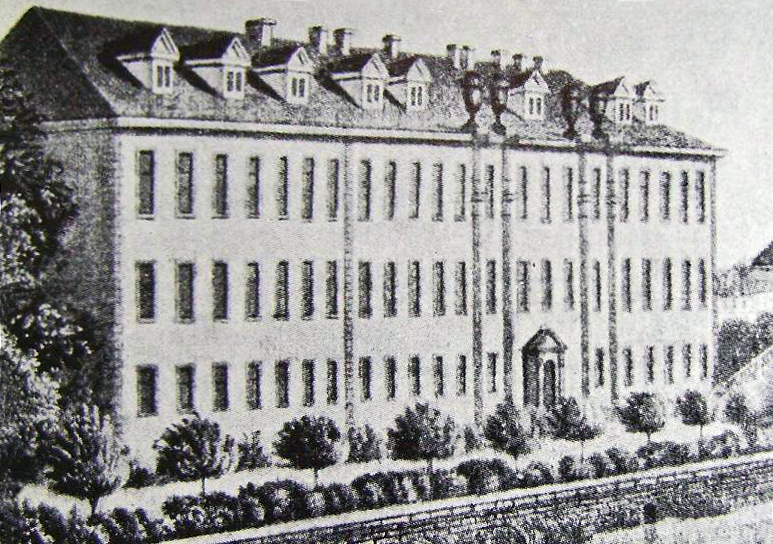
Hildburghausen Castle

== History ==
After the duke of Saxe-Gotha, Ernest the Pious, died on 26 March 1675 in Gotha, the duchy was divided on 24 February 1680 among his seven surviving sons. The lands of Saxe-Hildburghausen went to the sixth son, who became Ernest II, the first duke of Saxe-Hildburghausen. But the new duchy did not have complete independence. It had to depend on the higher authorities in Gotha for the matters of administration of its districts – the so-called "Nexus Gothanus" – because Gotha was the residence of Ernest II's oldest brother, who ruled as Frederick I, Duke of Saxe-Gotha-Altenburg. Saxe-Hildburghausen did not become fully separate until 1702.

In the beginning, the duchy had the district and city of Hildburghausen, the district and city of Heldburg, the district and city of Eisfeld, the district of Veilsdorf and the half of the district of Schalkau. Two more districts were added – Königsberg in 1683 and Sonnefeld in 1705. When Albert V, the duke of Saxe-Coburg, died in 1699 without any surviving descendants, disputes arose over the inheritance but, eventually, in 1714, Saxe-Hildburghausen agreed to exchange the district of Schalkau for parts of the other Saxon duchies – a piece of the former Duchy of Saxe-Römhild, the District of Behrungen, including the winery, and the monastery estate of Milz as well as the former properties of the Echter family of Mespelbrunn.

In 1684 the city of Hildburghausen became the residence of the duke so it was developed to reflect its new status. However, the elaborate buildings and courtyards of the princes strained the finances of the duchy so much that, in 1769, a forced management of debts by an Imperial Debit commission had to be ordered. It was placed under the direction of the Regent, Charlotte Amalie of Saxe-Meiningen.

With the dissolution of the Holy Roman Empire in 1806, Saxe-Hildburghausen gained its full sovereignty as the Duchy of Saxe-Hildburghausen. A few months later, on 15 December 1806, it, along with the other Ernestine duchies, entered the Confederation of the Rhine. In 1815, it joined the German Confederation. In 1818, it was one of the first German states to receive a constitution.

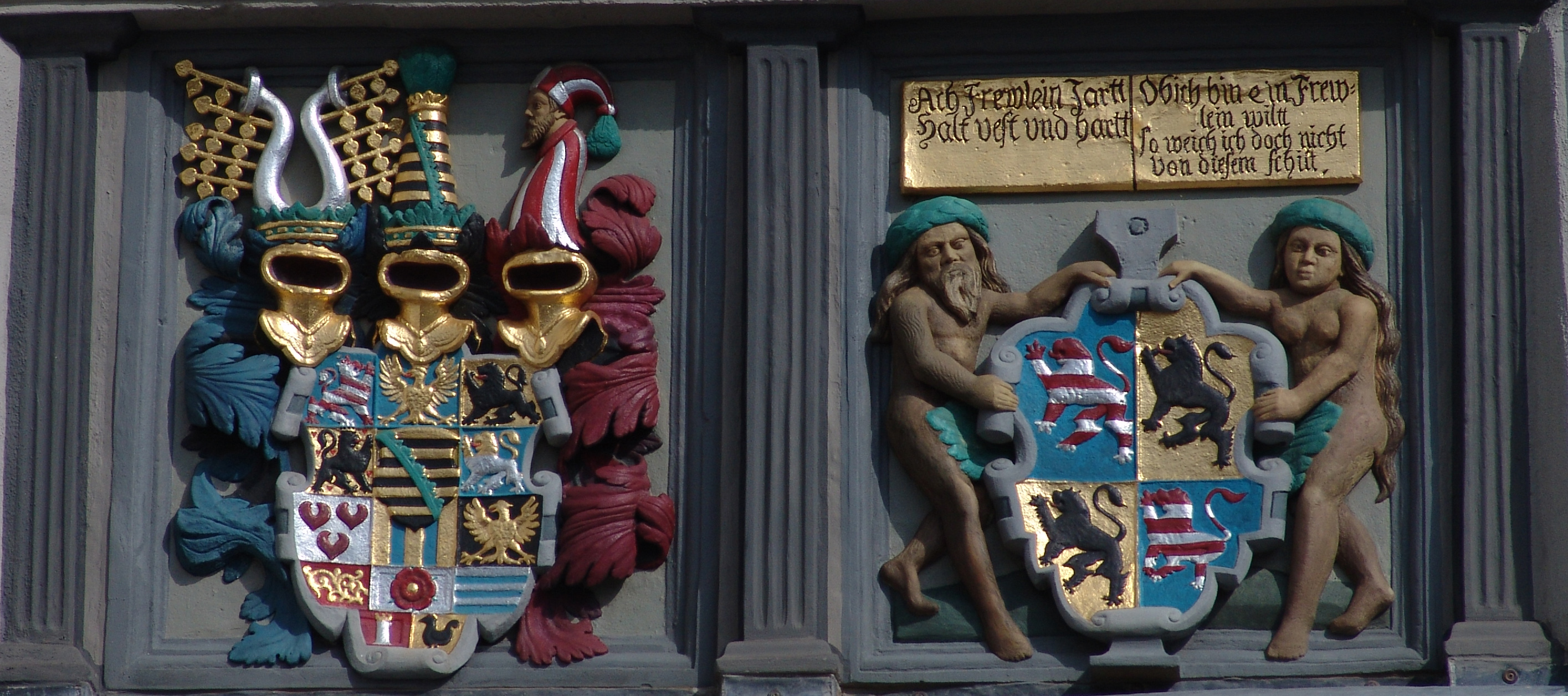
At the City Hall of Hildburghausen, two coats of arms are presented – for the Duchy of Saxe-Hilburghausen on the left and the City of Hildburghausen on the right. The city's shield is quartered with the striped lion of Thuringia and the black lion of the Margraviate of Meissen. The top row of the Duchy's shield is Thuringia, Duchy of Saxe-Lauenburg (golden eagle on blue field), Meissen. The second row has the Counties of Weimar-Orlamünde (black lion with hearts) and Pleißen (white lion with golden head), flanking the heart-shield of Saxony. The third row represents the Electorate of Saxe-Wittenberg (three red hearts), Margraviate of Landsberg (gold and blue stripes) and the Palatinate County of Saxony (golden eagle on black field). The fourth row is lined with the Regalia shield (“the blood flag” of royalty), the Burgraviate of Altenburg (red rose) and the Herrschaft of Eisenberg (silver and blue stripes). The last row is divided between the Herrschaft of Wildberg (white tower on red field) and Grafschaft of Henneberg (black hen).

The extinction of the oldest line, Saxe-Gotha-Altenburg in 1825 again led to inheritance disputes among the other lines of the Ernestine family. On 12 November 1826 the decision, from the arbitration of the supreme head of the family, King Frederick Augustus I of Saxony, resulted in the extensive rearrangement of the Ernestine duchies. Saxe-Hildburghausen lost the Districts of Königsberg and Sonnefeld to the new Duchy of Saxe-Coburg and Gotha and the rest of its territories to the Duchy of Saxe-Meiningen. But the last duke of Saxe-Hildburghausen, Frederick, became the new duke of Saxe-Altenburg.

In 1868, four districts were established in the Duchy of Saxe-Meiningen. One of them was Hildburghausen, with boundaries very similar to those of the former duchy. It remained almost unchanged until 1993, when the District of Suhl was dissolved and most of its municipalities joined the District of Hildburghausen.

== Dukes of Saxe-Hildburghausen ==
- 1680–1715 Ernest
- 1715–1724 Ernest Frederick I
- 1724–1745 Ernest Frederick II, from 1724 to 1728 under the Regency of his mother, Countess Sophia Albertine of Erbach-Erbach
- 1745–1780 Ernest Frederick III Carl, from 1745 to 1748 under the Regency of his mother, Countess Caroline of Erbach-Fürstenau
- 1780–1826 Frederick, since 1826 Duke of Saxe-Altenburg; from 1780 to 1787 under the Regency of his great-granduncle Prince Joseph Frederick

== Notable residents ==
- Sophie Henriette of Waldeck (1662–1702), Duchess of Saxe-Hildburghausen
- Eugene of Saxe-Hildburghausen (1730–1795), Prince of Saxe-Hildburghausen
- Louis Frederick of Saxe-Hildburghausen (1710–1759), Prince of Saxe-Hildburghausen
- Prince Joseph Frederick (1702–1787), Prince of Saxe-Hildburghausen
- Christiane Sophie Charlotte of Brandenburg-Bayreuth (1733–1757), Duchess of Saxe-Hildburghausen
- Ernestine Auguste Sophie of Saxe-Weimar-Eisenach (1740–1786), Duchess of Saxe-Hildburghausen
- Charlotte Georgine Luise of Mecklenburg-Strelitz (1769–1818), Duchess of Saxe-Hildburghausen
- Charlotte of Saxe-Hildburghausen (1787–1847), by marriage Princess of Württemberg, known as “Princess Paul of Württemberg” since then
- Therese of Saxe-Hildburghausen (1792–1854), by marriage Queen of Bavaria (who gave her name to a park in Munich, Theresienwiese and inspired, with her marriage, the Oktoberfest)
- Louise of Saxe-Hildburghausen (1794–1825), by marriage the Duchess of Nassau

== Bibliography ==
- (in German) Johann Werner Krauß, Kirchen–, Schul– und Landeshistorie von Hildburghausen [Church, School and State History of Hildburghausen] (Greiz, 1780)
