= Countess Sophia Albertine of Erbach-Erbach =

Duchess of Saxe-Hildburghausen (1683–1742)

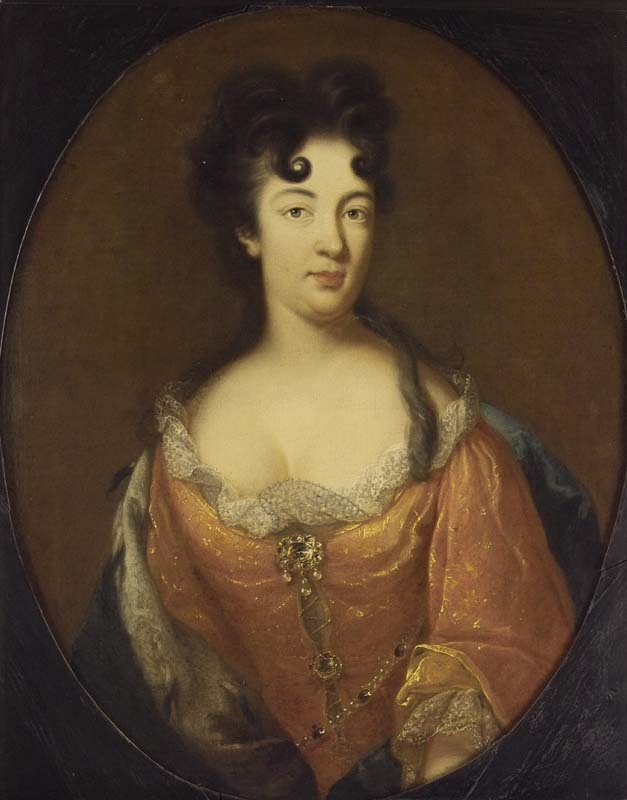

Duchess consort of Saxe-Hildburghausen
- Reign: 17 October 1715 – 9 March 1724
- Born: 30 July 1683; Erbach
- Died: 4 September 1742 (aged 59); Eisfeld
- Burial: District of Hildburghausen
- Spouse: Ernest Frederick I, Duke of Saxe-Hildburghausen
- Issue: Ernest Louis Hollandinus; Sophie Amalie Elisabeth; Ernest Louis; Ernest Frederick II, Duke of Saxe-Hildburghausen; Frederick August; Louis Frederick; Elisabeth Albertine; Emanuel Frederick Charles; Elisabeth Sophie; George Frederick William
- House: Erbach-Erbach (by birth); Saxe-Hildburghausen (by marriage)
- Father: George Louis I, Count of Erbach-Erbach
- Mother: Countess Amalia Katharina of Waldeck-Eisenberg

Sophia Albertine of Erbach-Erbach (30 July 1683, in Erbach – 4 September 1742, in Eisfeld), was by marriage duchess of Saxe-Hildburghausen. From 1724 to 1728, she was regent of Saxe-Hildburghausen during the minority of her son.

== Birth and early life ==
Sophia Albertine was born on 30 July 1683 in Erbach as the youngest daughter of George Louis I of Erbach-Erbach and his wife Countess Amalia Katharina of Waldeck-Eisenberg.

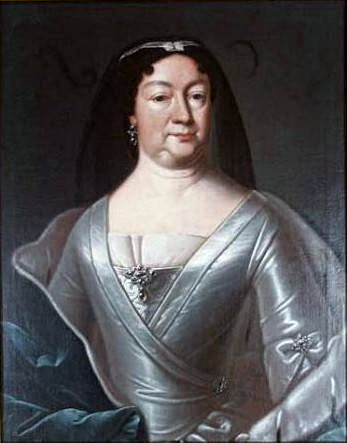
Countess Sophia Albertine of Erbach-Erbach in 1740.

== Marriage and issue ==
She married on 4 February 1704 in Erbach to Ernest Frederick I, Duke of Saxe-Hildburghausen, the eldest son of Ernest, Duke of Saxe-Hildburghausen and Countess Sophie Henriette of Waldeck. The couple had 14 children, eleven of whom died before reaching adulthood.

Sophia Albertine was responsible for the education of their children because her husband was largely devoted to the life of a soldier outside the country.

== Regency and later life ==
After her husband's death in 1724 Sophia Albertine acted as regent for her minor son, Ernest Frederick II of Saxe-Hildburghausen. She managed to reduce the national debt by savings and cuttings. A large part of the court was dismissed and the costly Guard was dissolved. She reduced the number of taxes from 16 to 8. In an attempt to obtain cash, she sold off the valuable ducal library.

Her husband had sold the District of Schalkau to the Duchy of Saxe-Meiningen in 1723, in order to raise money. She regarded this sale as illegal. Influenced by Prince Joseph of Saxe-Hildburghausen, who was in Hildeburghausen at the time, Sophia Albertine declared war on Saxe-Meiningen and had Schalkau occupied militarily on 11 July 1724.

After a fire in the town of Hildeburghausen in 1725, she played a major role in support of those affected. The main hall in the Hildburghausen Palace was equipped with an inlaid floor with a design in a star shape, in the center of which were the Duchess's initials "SA".

After her son took over government in 1728, she retired to her Wittum seat of Eisfeld, where she died on 4 September 1742 of unspecified causes. She was buried in the District of Hildburghausen.

German royalty
| Vacant Title last held by Sophie Henriette of Waldeck | Duchess consort of Saxe-Hildburghausen; 17 October 1715 – 9 March 1724 | Vacant Title next held by Caroline of Erbach-Fürstenau |
