= Torsten Warmuth =

German artist and photographer

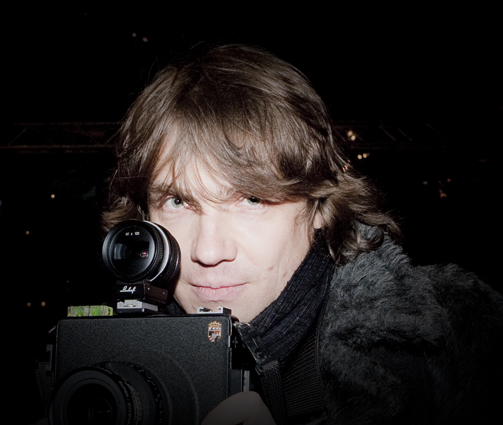
Torsten Warmuth

Torsten Warmuth (* 3 April 1968 in Hildburghausen/Thuringia) is a contemporary German artist and photographer.

== Life ==
After graduating from school in Erfurt, he completed a degree in science and a doctorate in computer-aided mathematics at the University of Kassel in 1995. As from 1996, Warmuth decided against an academic career and dedicated himself exclusively to photography.

== Art ==
Torsten Warmuth’s photographs focus on man’s anonymity in an urban environment. He sees the modern city as a backdrop to fragile moments and fleeting constellations. Early series like New Walk (1998) or Stadtwolf / Citywolf (2000) already document Warmuth’s predilection for photographic experiment. His photographically produced works are sharply focused, but nevertheless full of optical hazes and substantial uncertainties. Using long and multiple exposures, he attempts to convey the impression that his figures are elongating or even beginning to dissolve and disappear.

The photo historian Enno Kaufhold therefore sees in Warmuth’s images a merging of different moments that "actually take place in different places and at different times. And by means of longer exposure times these moments are shown in their continuum rather than as fixed, short fragments".

In recent years, cities like Buenos Aires, Cairo or New York City have provided the motifs for Warmuth's works. In the magazine Photonews, for instance, Ralf Hanselle wrote about the series It’s a Man’s World (2007), made in Cairo: "Like the great flàneur of the fin de siècle, Torsten Warmuth roves the stony urban wastes like a man engaged in an optical expedition. Like them, he understands urban space as modernity’s extreme." Warmuth received the Kunstpreis Fotografie 2008, endowed by the Lotto GmbH Land Brandenburg, for his cycle It's a Man's World.

In 2009, Warmuth developed his technique of "Silver Painting". Besides the use of light, here he also paints a wide range of toners onto the silver gelatin paper by hand. The processes employed are confined to analogue techniques. This manual approach means that he creates only unique works. Silver painting differs from photography decisively as a consequence of its unique, non-reproducible quality and painterly effect. These predominantly large-format, multi-toned silver gelatin prints are always produced manually by the artist, using classical analogue darkroom techniques.

Since 2012, he has been producing colour works, leading to new levels of abstraction and expression – the origination of Elusionistic Art.

== Elusionistic Art ==
Images that cannot be taken directly by the camera or seen by the human eye … A thought, an idea; an image that only develops after it has been recorded photographically, albeit through that very act … Something that expands our view of the world, our awareness, the space for association … Corresponding far more to fiction than to reporting: Let us call it Elusionistic Art.

Elusionism [Lat. eludere / Engl. elude – evade, escape, avoid; Engl. elusive – fleeting, difficult to grasp, evading]

== Exhibitions ==
- 2013 Recapturing Freedom, Haus am Kleistpark, Berlin (Information About the Artist)
- 2009 Sex, Power & Money, Everard Read, Kapstadt
- 2008 The Last Woman, Galerie Brusberg, Berlin
- 2006 Nachtsammler, Galerie Mamia Bretesché, Paris (also at Galerie Seitz & Partner, Berlin and Kunsthalle Erfurt)
- 2004 Torsten Warmuth, Kunstsammlungen Jena
- 2004 About Face – Photography and the Death of the Portrait, Hayward Gallery, London
- 2004 Je t’envisage – La disparition du portrait/The Disappearance of the Portrait, Musée de l'Élysée. Lausanne
- 2003 Cara a Cara/Face to Face, Culturgest, Lisbon
- 2002 Zanikanie/Disappearing, Warsaw Centrum Sztuki Współczesnej Zamek Ujazdowski, Warsaw
- 1998 New Walk, Eastside Gallery, Kassel

== Sources ==
- Ralf Hanselle: The Great Flaneur, in: TAKE on art, Volume 1, Issue 1/2010, New Delhi, pp. 46–47.

== Literature ==
- Kai Uwe Schierz: Fotografischer Bewusstseinsstrom, in: catalogue torsten warmuth, ed. Kunstsammlungen Jena, 2004, pp. 36 – 37.
- Erik Stephan: Zeitsprung. Die Dehnung des Augenblicks, in: catalogue torsten warmuth, ed. Kunstsammlungen Jena, 2004, pp. 4 – 5.
- Sabine Maria Schmidt: Fotografien als Vorstellungsbilder , in: catalogue Nachtsammler | Night Gatherers, ed. Kunsthalle Erfurt, 2006, p. 5.
- Robert Shore: Post-Photography. The Artist with a Camera. Laurence King Publishing, London 2014, pp. 208–211.

== Filmography ==
- Interview with the art historian Enno Kaufhold in a TV-contribution for Stilbruch, RBB-Fernsehen on 8 Nov 2007.
