= Countess Sophie Henriette of Waldeck =

Sophie Henriette of Waldeck
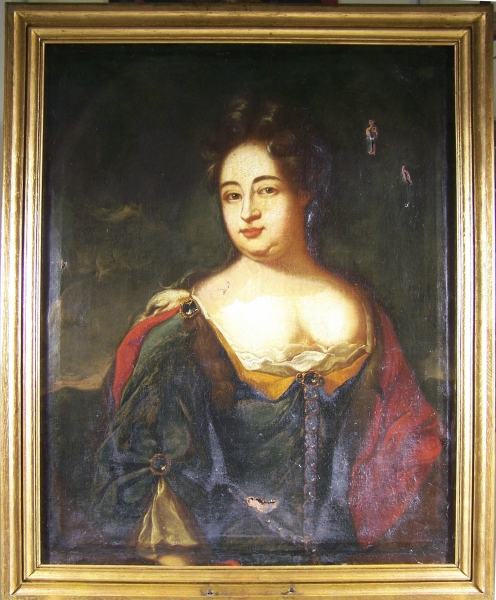
- Portrait c. 1700

Duchess consort of Saxe-Hildburghausen
- Reign: 30 November 1680 – 15 October 1702
- Born: 3 August 1662; Arolsen
- Died: 15 October 1702 (aged 40); Erbach
- Spouse: Ernest, Duke of Saxe-Hildburghausen (m. 1680)
- Issue: Ernest Frederick I, Duke of Saxe-Hildburghausen; Princess Sophie Charlotte; Prince Joseph
Names
- Sophie Henriette of Waldeck
- House: Waldeck
- Father: Prince Georg Friedrich of Waldeck
- Mother: Elisabeth Charlotte of Nassau-Siegen

Sophia Henriette of Waldeck (3 August 1662, Arolsen – 15 October 1702, Erbach) was a Princess of Waldeck by birth and by marriage Duchess of Saxe-Hildburghausen.

== Life ==
Sophie Henriette was the daughter of Field Marshal Prince Georg Friedrich of Waldeck and his wife Countess Elisabeth Charlotte of Nassau-Siegen.

She married on 30 November 1680 in Arolsen with Duke Ernest of Saxe-Hildburghausen, a friend and comrade of her father, with whom she lived in Arolsen until 1683. After the completion of the Castle in Hildburghausen, the couple moved there. Sophie Henriette had a very close relationship with her eldest son Ernest Frederick I; she arranged his marriage to her first cousin once removed Countess Sophia Albertine of Erbach-Erbach.

Sophie Henriette died in 1702, ten days after her youngest son was born, before the wedding of Ernest Frederick and Sophia Albertine. She was the first person to be buried in the Royal Crypt in the Palace Church in Hildburghausen.

Sophia Henriette's father died in 1692 leaving no male heirs. Waldeck-Eisenberg fell to the Waldeck-Wildungen line; the Lordship of Culemborg in the Netherlands was inherited by Sophia Henriette's older sister Louisa Anna (by marriage Countess of Erbach-Fürstenau), and after Louise's death in 1714 without surviving issue, by Sophia Henriette's son Ernest Frederick I, who sold it to the Dutch province of Gelderland in 1748.

== Issue ==
1. Ernst Frederick I, Duke of Saxe-Hildburghausen (b. Gotha, 21 August 1681 – d. Hildburghausen, 9 March 1724).
2. Sophie Charlotte (b. Arolsen, 23 December 1682 – d. Eisfeld, 20 April 1684).
3. Sophie Charlotte (b. Hildburghausen, 23 March 1685 – d. Hildburghausen, 4 June 1710).
4. Karl Wilhelm (b. Arolsen, 25 July 1686 – d. Arolsen, 2 April 1687).
5. Joseph Maria Frederick Wilhelm (b. Erbach, 5 October 1702 – d. Hildburghausen, 4 January 1787).

== Ancestry ==
Ancestors of Countess Sophie Henriette of Waldeck

8. Josias I, Count of Waldeck-Eisenberg
4. Wolrad IV, Count of Waldeck-Eisenberg
9. Mary of Barby and Mühlingen
2. Prince Georg Friedrich of Waldeck
10. James III, Margrave of Baden-Hachberg
5. Margravine Anne of Baden-Hochberg
11. Elisabeth of Culemborg-Pallandt
1. Countess Sophie Henriette of Waldeck
12. John VII, Count of Nassau-Siegen
6. William, Count of Nassau-Siegen
13. Magdalene of Waldeck-Wildungen
3. Elisabeth Charlotte of Nassau-Siegen
14. George III, Count of Erbach-Breuberg
7. Christiane of Erbach
15. Countess Mary of Barby and Mühlingen

German royalty
| New Creation | Duchess consort of Saxe-Hildburghausen; 30 November 1680 – 15 October 1702 | Vacant Title next held by Sophia Albertine of Erbach-Erbach |
