= Prince Georg Friedrich of Waldeck =

Dutch General and German Field Marshal

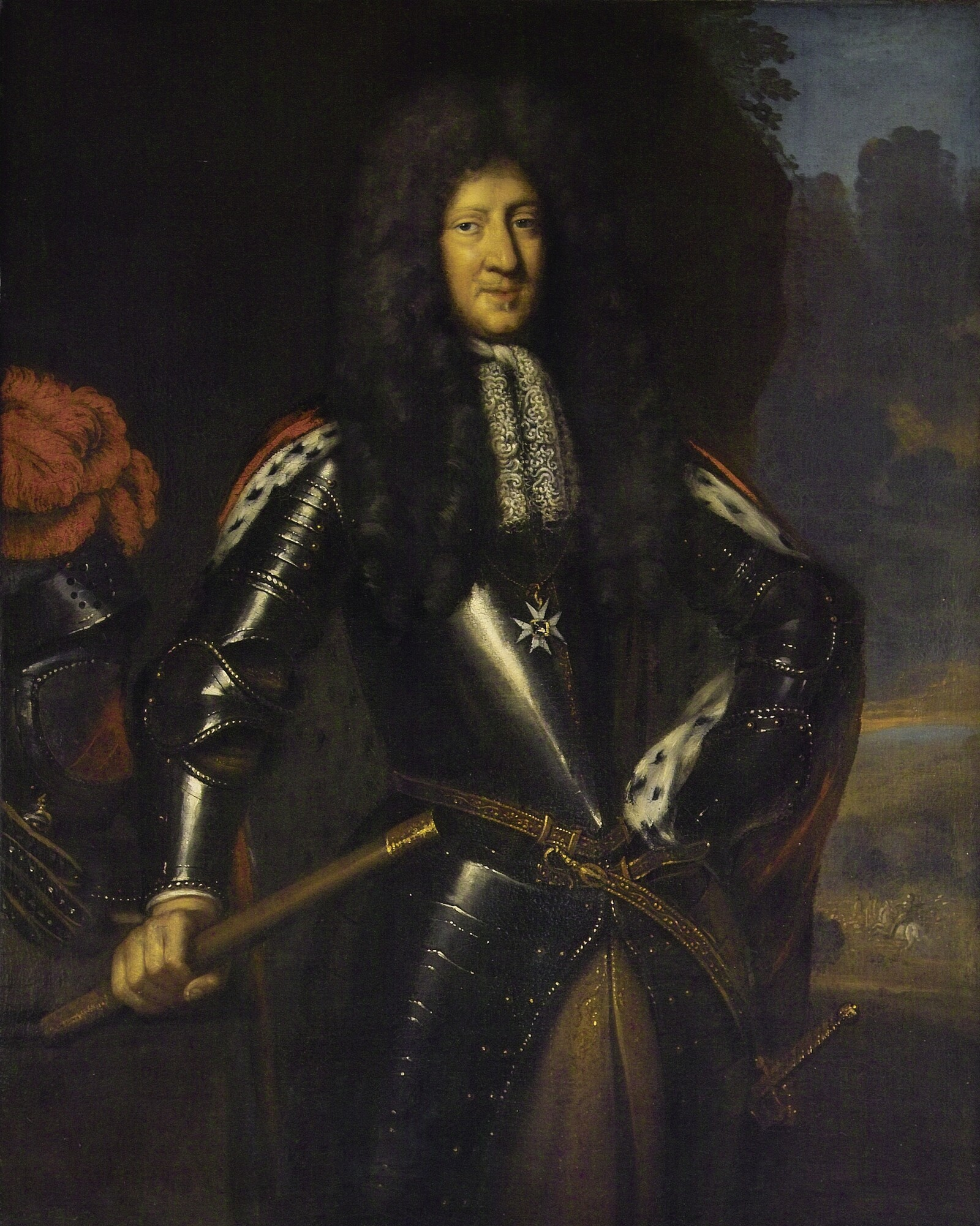
- Georg Friedrich of Waldeck
- Born: 31 January 1620; Arolsen, County of Waldeck
- Died: 19 November 1692 (aged 72); Arolsen, County of Waldeck
- Spouse: Elisabeth Charlotte of Nassau-Siegen
- Military career
- Allegiance: Brandenburg-Prussia; Habsburg Monarchy; Dutch Republic
- Branch: Dutch States Army
- Rank: Field marshal
- Conflicts: Second Northern War; Battle of Warsaw; Franco-Dutch War; Battle of Woerden; Siege of Naarden; Battle of Seneffe; Battle of Cassel; Battle of Saint-Denis; Great Turkish War; Battle of Vienna; Nine Years' War; Battle of Walcourt; Battle of Fleurus; Battle of Leuze

Prince Georg Friedrich of Waldeck (31 January 1620 – 19 November 1692) was a German and Dutch Field Marshal and, for the last three years of his life, Grand Master of the Order of Saint John (Bailiwick of Brandenburg).

In 1641, Waldeck entered the service of the States-General of the Netherlands; later in 1651, in the service of Brandenburg, he reached the highest rank as minister. He changed the foreign policy completely by abandoning the alliance with the Emperor and trying to forge a coalition with the Protestant princes.

In 1656 he arranged a coalition with Sweden, and commanded the cavalry in the Battle of Warsaw (1656) against Poland. He was dismissed in 1658 when Frederick William, Elector of Brandenburg made peace with Poland.

After that he fought under Charles X Gustav of Sweden against Denmark, as German Reichsfeldmarschall in 1664 near Sankt Gotthard. In 1683 he commanded Bavarian troops during the Battle of Vienna. In 1685 he fought as a free-lancer for the Duke of Lorraine and the Elector of Bavaria.

After William III left for England in 1688 to claim the English throne, Waldeck was appointed Field Marshal of William's forces during the War of the Grand Alliance in the Spanish Netherlands. Although he was victorious at the Battle of Walcourt in 1689, the following year he suffered a heavy defeat at the hands of Marshal Luxembourg at the Battle of Fleurus.

In 1691, he was again outmanoeuvred by Luxembourg and defeated at the Battle of Leuze. After this defeat Waldeck was appointed chief-of-staff of the Dutch States Army. He died on 19 November 1692 in Arolsen.

== Family ==
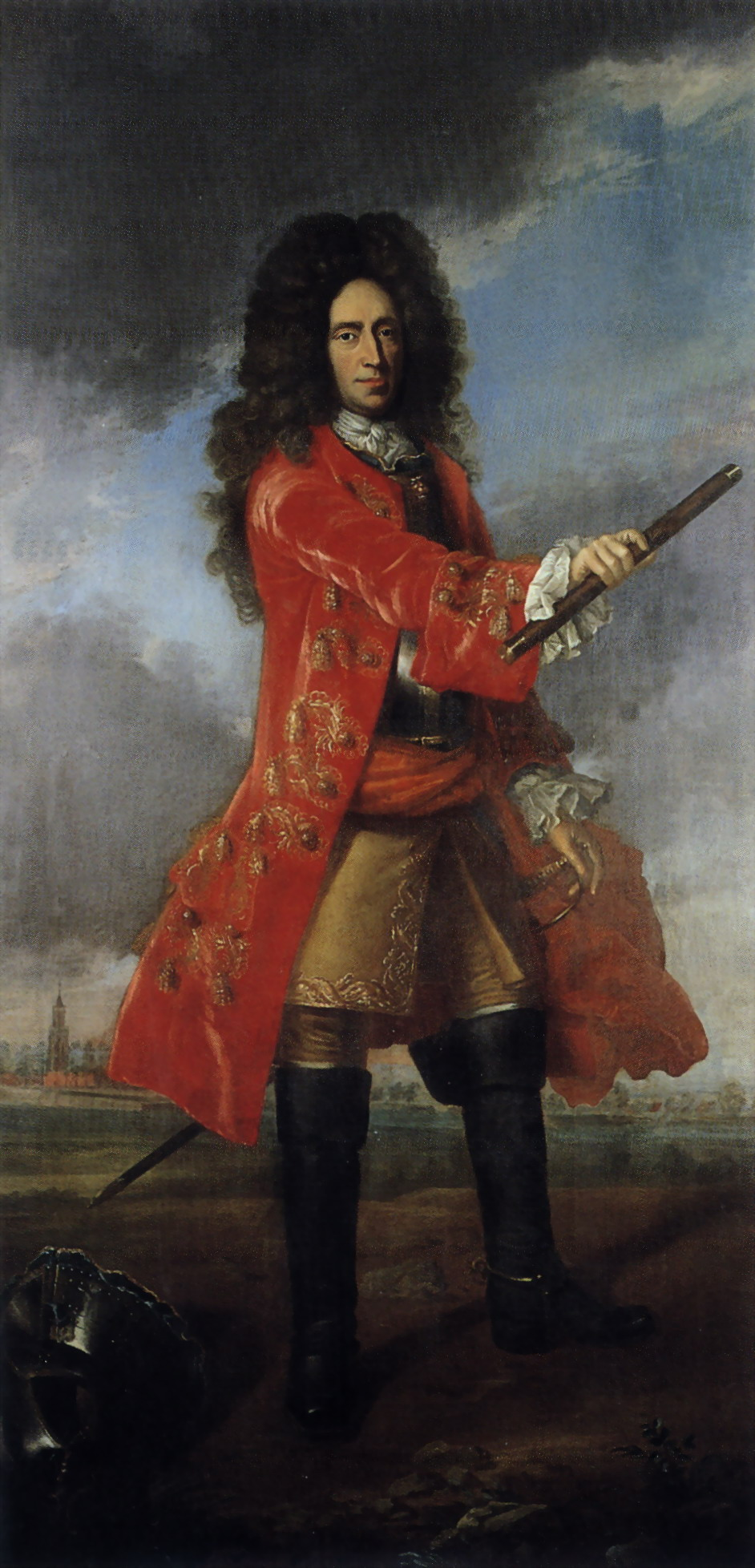
Posthumous portrait of Prince Georg Friedrich of Waldeck circa 1750 by Tischbein

He was the son of Count Wolrad IV of Waldeck-Eisenberg and his wife Anna of Baden-Durlach, heir to the Lordship of Culemborg in today's Netherlands.

In Culemborg on 29 November 1643 Georg Friedrick married Elisabeth Charlotte (11 March 1626 16 November 1694), a daughter of Count William of Nassau-Siegen and his wife Countess Christiane of Erbach. They had nine children:

- Wolrad Christian (4 April 1645 – 1650).
- Friedrich Wilhelm (1649 – 15 March 1651).
- Karl Wilhelm (21 June 1650 – 1653).
- Louise Anna (18 April 1653 – 30 June 1714), married 22 August 1671 George IV, Count of Erbach-Fürstenau.
- Charlotte Amalie (20 October 1654 – June 1657).
- Friedrich Wilhelm (3 November 1657 – 21 November 1670).
- Karl Gustav (28 February 1659 – 24 June 1678).
- Sophie Henriette (3 August 1662 – 15 October 1702), married 30 November 1680 Ernest, Duke of Saxe-Hildburghausen.
- Albertine Elisabeth (9 February 1664 – 1 November 1727; married 16 January 1706 Philipp Louis, Count of Erbach-Erbach.

After his death without surviving sons, Georg Friedrich's lands in Waldeck-Eisenberg fell to the Waldeck-Wildungen line; the Lordship of Culemborg in the Netherlands was inherited by Sophia Henriette's older sister Louisa Anna (by marriage Countess of Erbach-Fürstenau), and after Louise's death in 1714 without surviving issue, by Sophia Henriette's son Ernest Frederick I, who sold it to the Dutch province of Gelderland in 1748.

Prince Georg Friedrich of Waldeck Born: 31 January 1620 Died: 19 November 1692
Preceded by Johann Moritz, Fürst von Nassau-Siegen	Herrenmeister (Grand Master) of the Order of Saint John; 1689–1692	Succeeded by Karl Philipp, Markgraf zu Brandenburg-Schwedt
