= Veilsdorf =

- Municipality
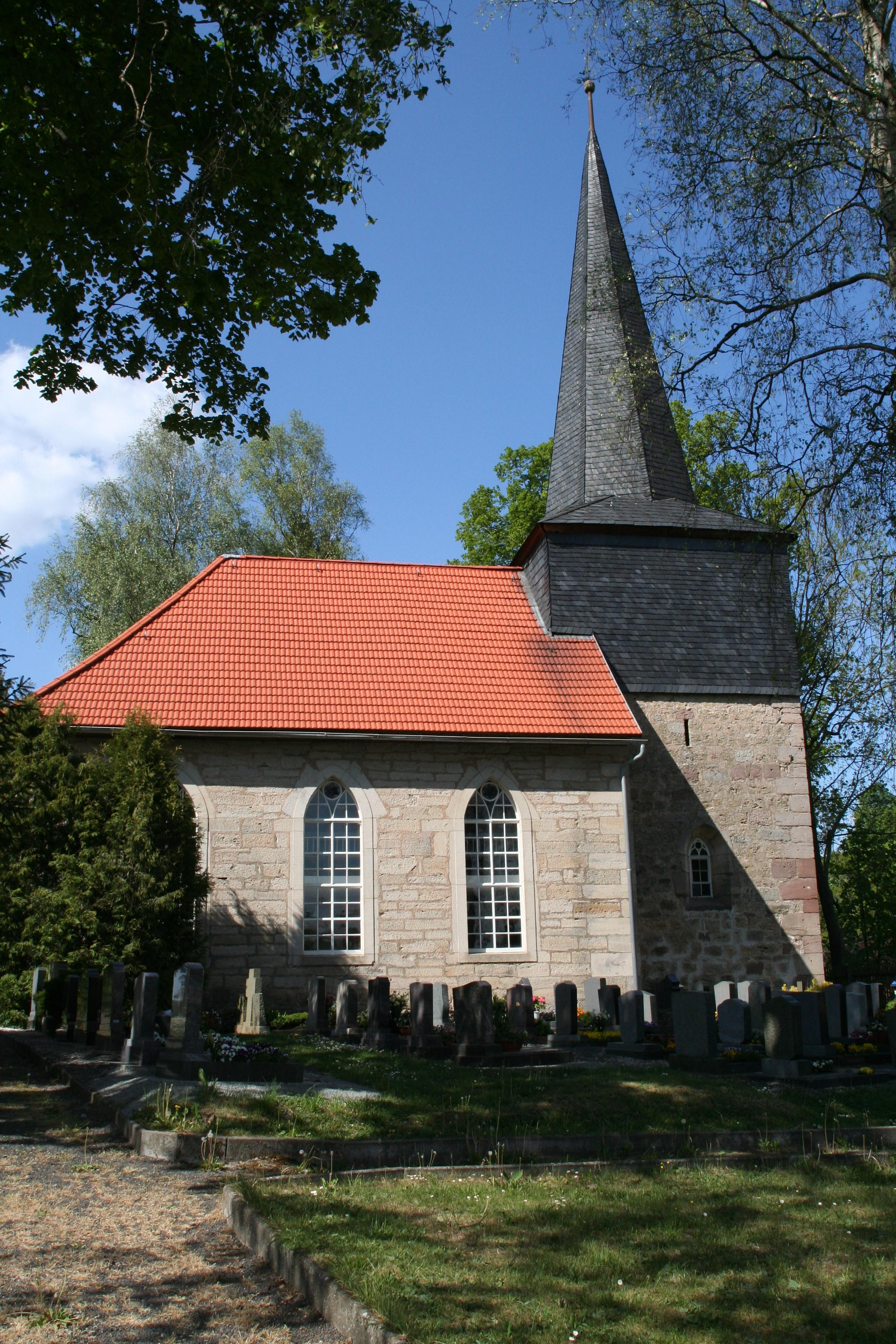
- Church of Saint Vitus

- Coat of arms

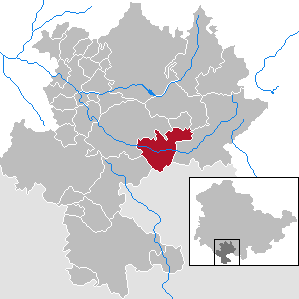
- Location of Veilsdorf within Hildburghausen district
- Interactive map of Veilsdorf
- Location within Germany Location within Thuringia
- Coordinates: 50°24′N 10°49′E
- Country: Germany
- State: Thuringia
- District: Hildburghausen
- Subdivisions: 6

Government
  - Mayor (2022–28): Stefan Ullrich

Area
  - Total: 30.91 km^{2} (11.93 sq mi)
- Elevation: 390 m (1,280 ft)

Population (2025-12-31)
  - Total: 2,667
  - Density: 86.28/km^{2} (223.5/sq mi)
- Time zone: UTC+01:00 (CET)
  - Summer (DST): UTC+02:00 (CEST)
- Postal codes: 98669
- Dialling codes: 03685
- Vehicle registration: HBN
- Website: www.veilsdorf.de

Veilsdorf is a municipality in the district of Hildburghausen, in Thuringia, Germany. It lies on the river Werra.
