= Ernest, Duke of Saxe-Hildburghausen =

Ernest
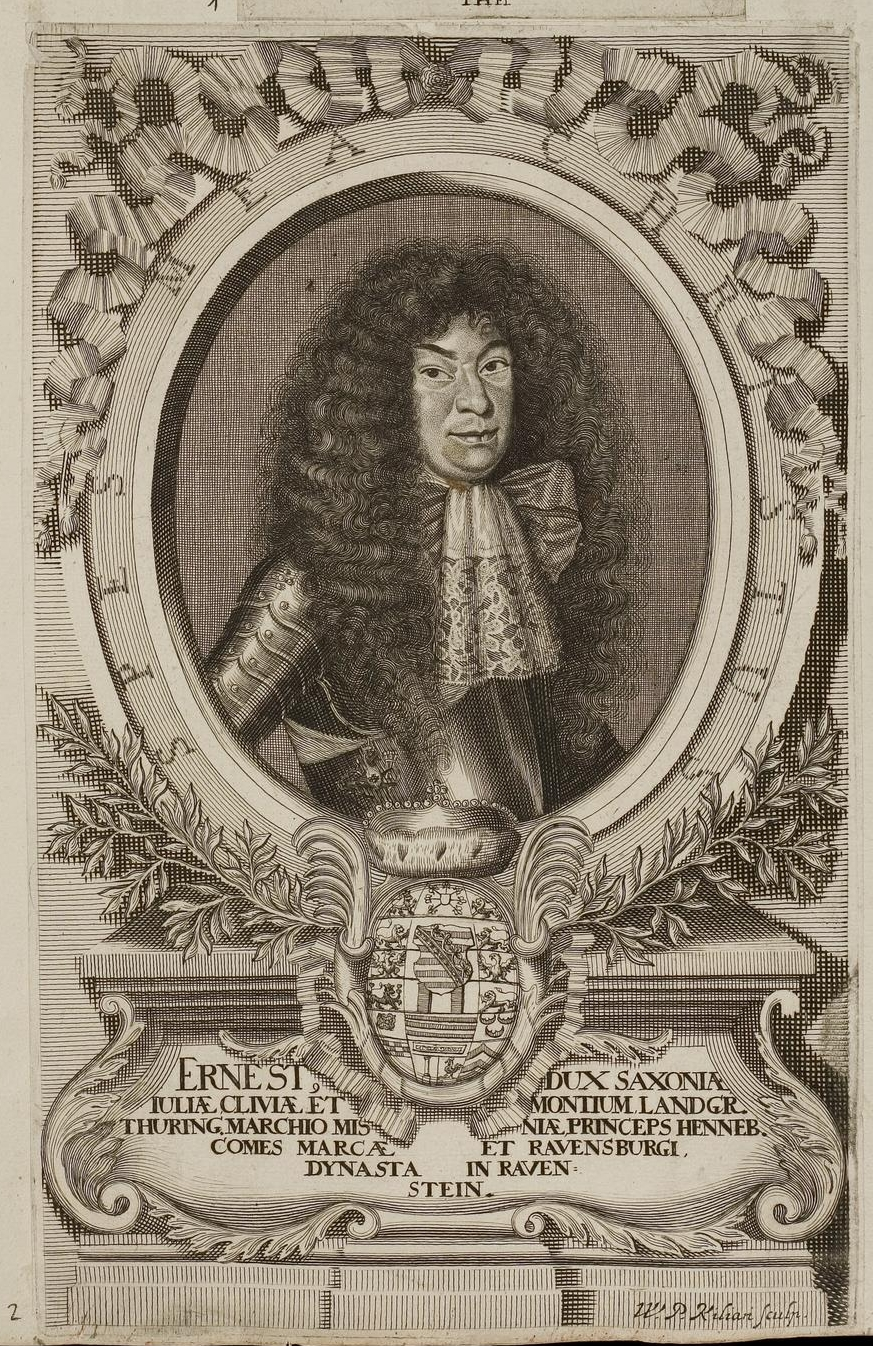
- Engraving c. 1670s

Duke of Saxe-Hildburghausen
- Reign: 26 March 1675 – 17 October 1715
- Predecessor: New creation
- Successor: Ernest Frederick I
- Born: 12 June 1655; Gotha
- Died: 17 October 1715 (aged 60); Hildburghausen
- Spouse: Sophie of Waldeck
- Issue among others...: Ernest Frederick I Prince Joseph
- House: Wettin (Ernestine line) (by birth); Saxe-Hildburghausen (founder)
- Father: Ernest I, Duke of Saxe-Gotha
- Mother: Elisabeth Sophie of Saxe-Altenburg
- Religion: Lutheran

Ernest, Duke of Saxe-Hildburghausen (German: Ernst von Sachsen-Hildburghausen; 12 June 1655 in Gotha – 17 October 1715 in Hildburghausen) was a duke of Saxe-Hildburghausen.

He was the ninth but sixth surviving son of Ernest I, Duke of Saxe-Gotha and Elisabeth Sophie of Saxe-Altenburg.

When his father died in 1675, Ernest and his six brothers jointly assumed the government of the duchy; five years later, in 1680, and under the treaty of division of the family lands, he received the towns of Hildburghausen, Eisfeld, Heldburg, Königsberg. Ernest became thereby founder and first duke of Saxe-Hildburghausen. After the death of his brothers Heinrich and Albrecht without male descendants, he took the towns of Sonnefeld and Behringen.

Ernest settled his official residence in Hildburghausen and began the building of his castle. In 1710 he approved the building in his lands of a new city of French Huguenot families, who were driven out after the Edict of Nantes from France.

As Master of Cavalry he fought in 1683 in the Battle of Vienna, and 1685 in the conquest of Gran and Neuhaeusel, after this he entered the Dutch States Army as a Colonel with the conquest of Kaiserswerth.

In the building of his new residence, Ernest acquired a serious indebtedness of the principality to his brothers, which could not be reduced even by ever larger taxations.

== Issue ==
He was married in Arolsen on 30 November 1680 to Sophie of Waldeck. They had five children:

1. Ernest Frederick I, Duke of Saxe-Hildburghausen (b. Gotha, 21 August 1681 – d. Hildburghausen, 9 March 1724).
2. Sophie Charlotte (b. Arolsen, 23 December 1682 – d. Eisfeld, 20 April 1684) died young.
3. Sophie Charlotte (b. Hildburghausen, 23 March 1685 – d. Hildburghausen, 4 June 1710) died unmarried.
4. Karl Wilhelm (b. Arolsen, 25 July 1686 – d. Arolsen, 2 April 1687) died young.
5. Joseph Maria Frederick Wilhelm (b. Erbach, 5 October 1702 – d. Hildburghausen, 4 January 1787).

== Ancestry ==
Ancestors of Ernest, Duke of Saxe-Hildburghausen

8. Johann Wilhelm, Duke of Saxe-Weimar
4. John II, Duke of Saxe-Weimar
9. Dorothea Susanne of Simmern
2. Ernest I, Duke of Saxe-Gotha
10. Joachim Ernest, Prince of Anhalt
5. Dorothea Maria of Anhalt
11. Eleonore of Württemberg
1. Ernest, Duke of Saxe-Hildburghausen
12. Frederick Wilhelm I, Duke of Saxe-Weimar
6. Johann Philipp, Duke of Saxe-Altenburg
13. Anna Maria of the Palatinate-Neuburg
3. Elisabeth Sophie of Saxe-Altenburg
14. Henry Julius, Duke of Brunswick-Lüneburg
7. Elisabeth of Brunswick-Wolfenbüttel
15. Elizabeth of Denmark

Preceded by Duchy founded	Duke of Saxe-Hildburghausen; 1675–1715	Succeeded by Ernst Frederick I
