= Hildburghausen =

- Town
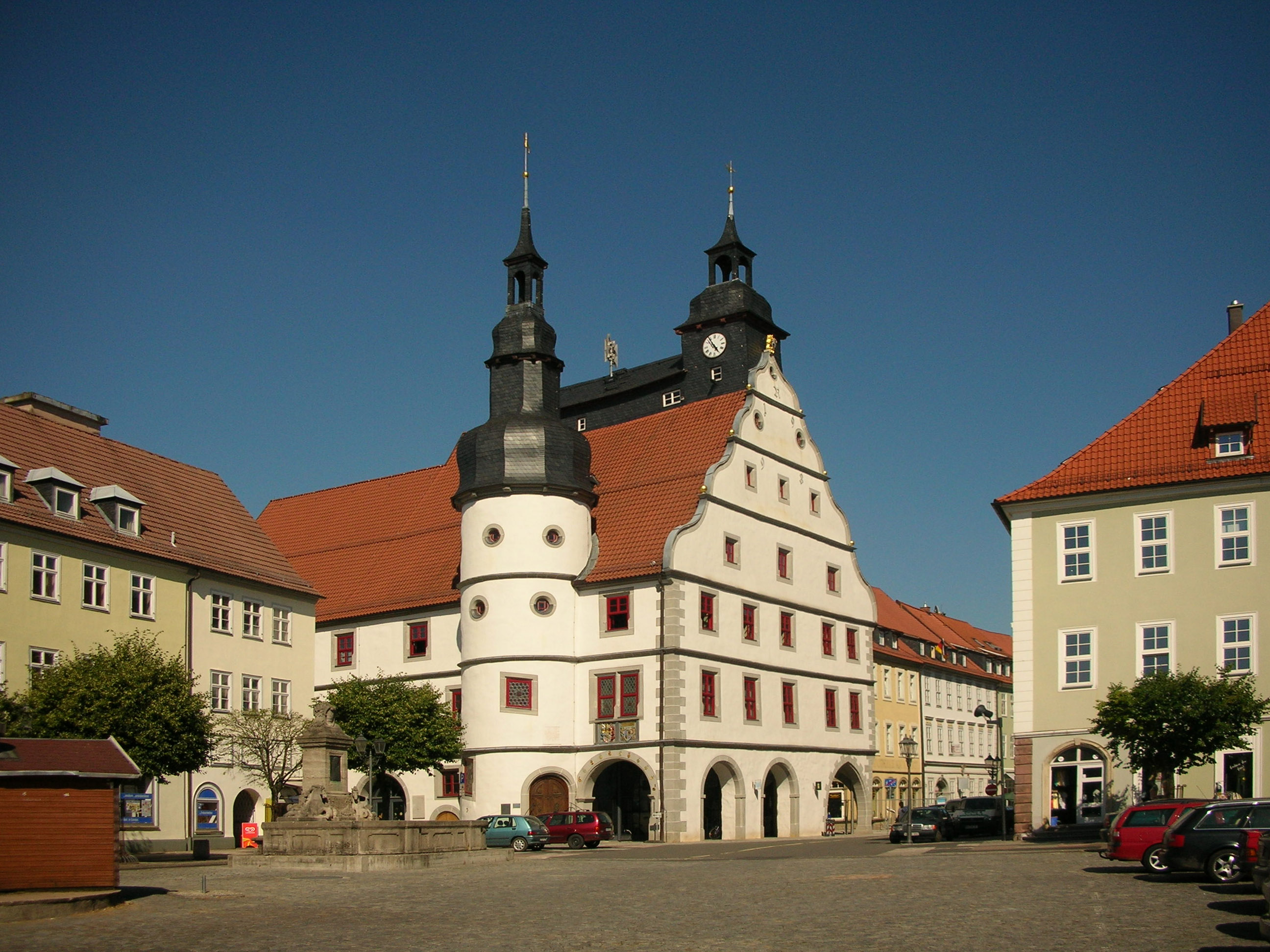
- Town hall on the main square

- Coat of arms

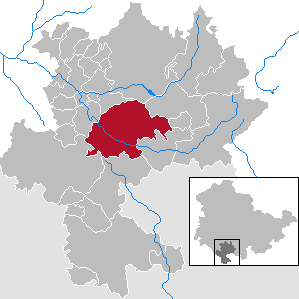
- Location of Hildburghausen within Hildburghausen district
- Interactive map of Hildburghausen
- Location within Germany Location within Thuringia
- Coordinates: 50°25′N 10°45′E
- Country: Germany
- State: Thuringia
- District: Hildburghausen
- Subdivisions: 10

Government
  - Mayor (2023–29): Patrick Hammerschmidt

Area
  - Total: 72.9 km^{2} (28.1 sq mi)
- Elevation: 381 m (1,250 ft)

Population (2025-12-31)
  - Total: 11,632
  - Density: 160/km^{2} (413/sq mi)
- Time zone: UTC+01:00 (CET)
  - Summer (DST): UTC+02:00 (CEST)
- Postal codes: 98641–98646
- Dialling codes: 03685
- Vehicle registration: HBN
- Website: www.hildburghausen.de

Hildburghausen (German pronunciation: [hɪltbʊʁkˈhaʊ̯zn̩]) is a town in Thuringia in central Germany, capital of the Hildburghausen district.

== Geography ==
It is situated in the Franconian part of Thuringia south of the Thuringian Forest, in the valley of the Werra River. The town centre is located about 20 km (12 mi) south of Suhl and 20 km (12 mi) northwest of Coburg.

== History ==
The settlement of Hilteburgehusin was first mentioned in a 1234 deed, when the Counts of Henneberg sold it to the Prince-Bishops of Würzburg. Repurchased in 1316, the Henneberg lords vested the citizens with town privileges in 1324 and had city walls erected. In 1353, the estates of Hildburghausen were inherited by the Wettin landgrave Frederick III of Thuringia and upon the 1485 Treaty of Leipzig became part of the Ernestine duchies.

In 1528, the Hildburghausen citizens turned Protestant. The town fell to the newly established Duchy of Saxe-Coburg in 1572 and upon the extinction of the line in 1638 passed to the Duchy of Saxe-Altenburg. In 1680, it became the residence of the Ernestine dukes of Saxe-Hildburghausen until its dissolution in 1826, after which it passed to the Duchy of Saxe-Meiningen. The town became part of the new state of Thuringia in 1920.

== Sights ==
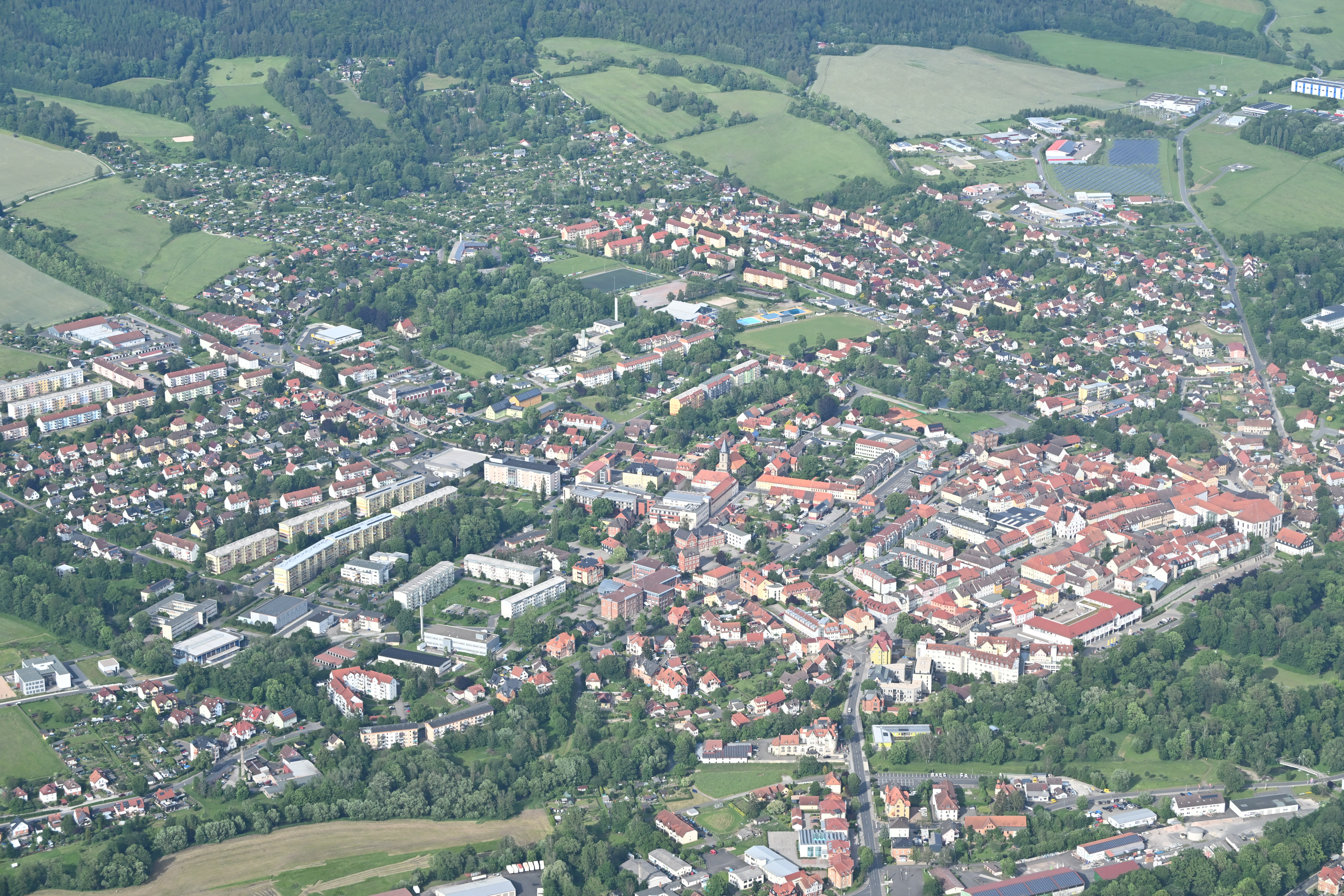
Aerial view of Hildburghausen

- A ducal palace, erected between 1685 and 1695, with a park in which there is a monument to Queen Louise of Prussia
- The old town hall
- A monument erected to those citizens who died in the Franco-Prussian War of 1870–71

== Notable people ==
- Karoline von Feuchtersleben (1774–1842) born in Hildburghausen
- Hans-Dieter Fritschler (1941–2021) born in Hildburghausen, politician
- Friedrich Dotzauer (1783–1860), cellist and composer
- Princess Charlotte of Saxe-Hildburghausen (1787–1847)
- Princess Louise of Saxe-Hildburghausen (1794–1825)
- Joseph Meyer (1796–1856), publisher
- Marie of Saxe-Altenburg (1818–1907)
- Hans Meyer (1858–1929), geologist
- Ronald Weigel (born 1959) in Hildburghausen, athlete
- Torsten Warmuth (born 1968), artist and photographer
- Nadine Hoffmann (born 1979), politician
