= Duchess Christiane of Mecklenburg =

Member of the ducal family of Mecklenburg

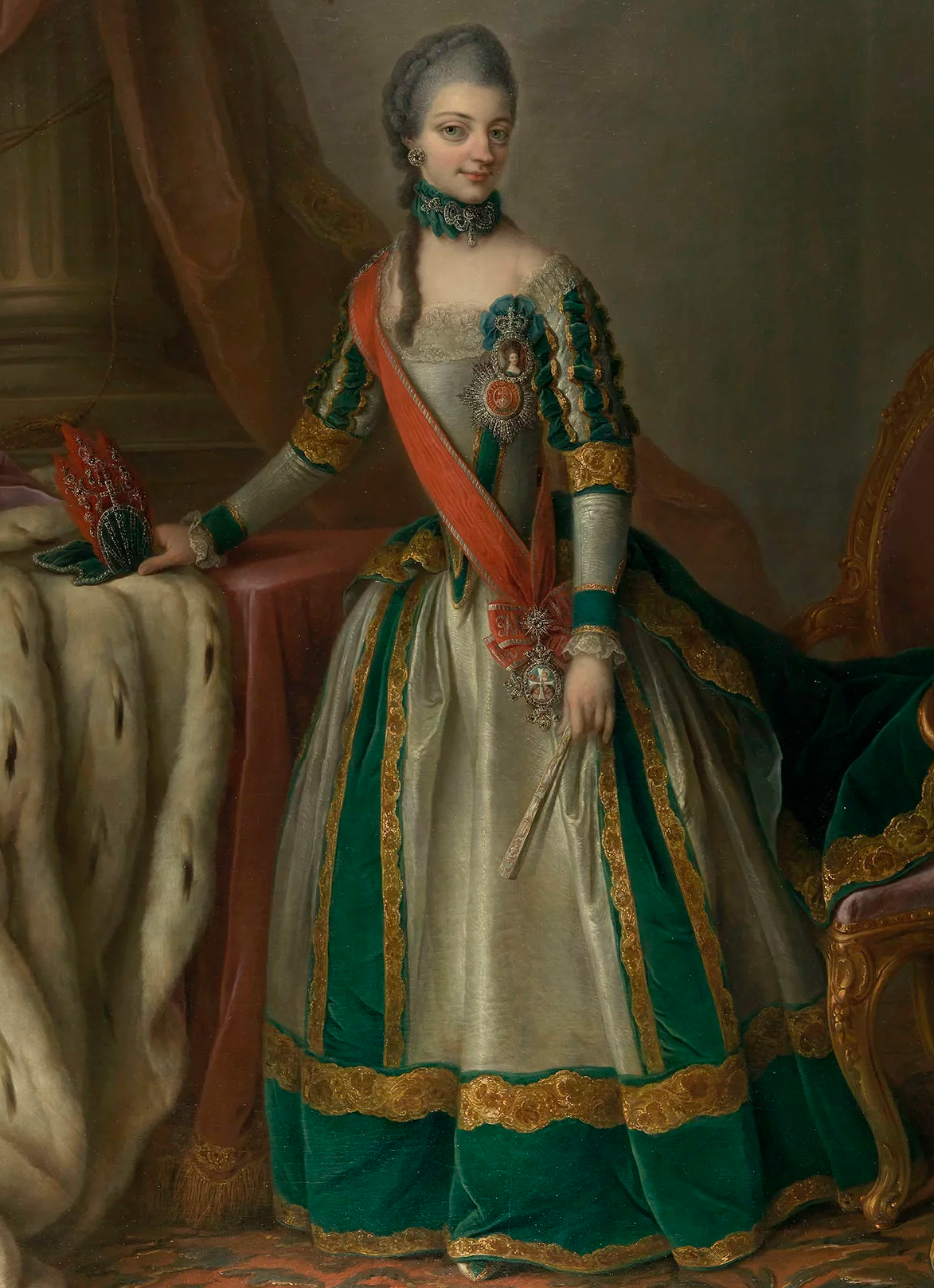
- Christiane in 1767 by Daniel Woge, wearing the Order of Saint Catherine (Royal Collection)
- Born: 6 December 1735; Unteres Schloß, Mirow, Duchy of Mecklenburg-Strelitz, Holy Roman Empire
- Died: 31 August 1794 (aged 58); Neustrelitz, Duchy of Mecklenburg-Strelitz, Holy Roman Empire
Names
- English: Christiana Sophia Albertina; German: Christiane Sophie Albertine
- House: Mecklenburg-Strelitz
- Father: Duke Charles Louis Frederick of Mecklenburg
- Mother: Princess Elisabeth Albertine of Saxe-Hildburghausen

Duchess Christiane Sophie Albertine of Mecklenburg-Strelitz (Note: Also "Christine" or "Christina".) (6 December 1735 – 31 August 1794) was a granddaughter of Duke Adolphus Frederick II. She was the eldest sister of Charlotte, Queen of the United Kingdom; Adolphus Frederick IV, Duke of Mecklenburg-Strelitz; and Charles II, Grand Duke of Mecklenburg-Strelitz.

== Early life ==
Christiane Sophie Albertine was born at Unteres Schloß in Mirow in the small duchy of Mecklenburg-Strelitz, part of the Holy Roman Empire, as the eldest child of Duke Charles Louis Frederick of Mecklenburg and his wife, Princess Elisabeth Albertine of Saxe-Hildburghausen.

== Biography ==
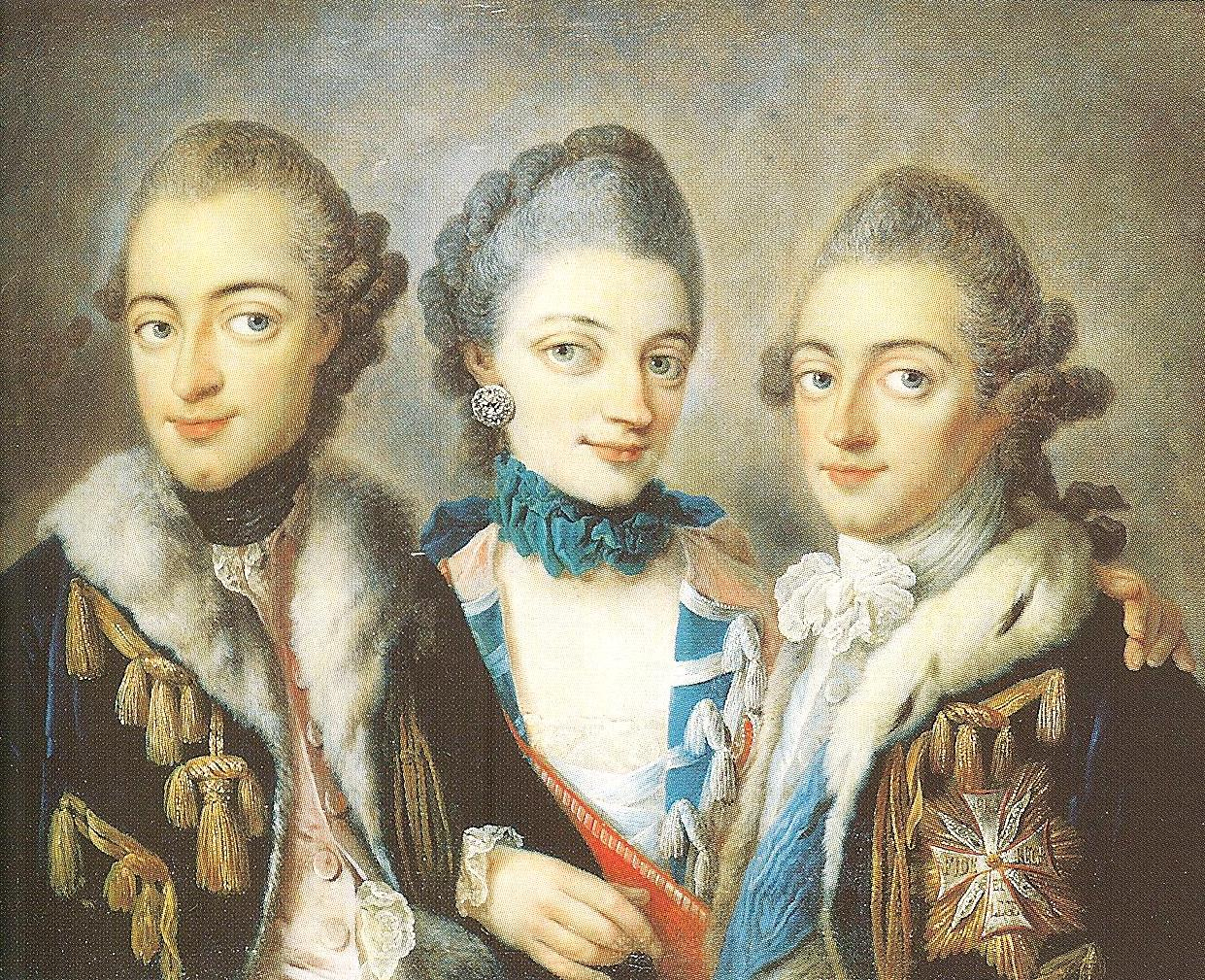
Christiane with her brothers Ernest Gottlob (left) and Adolphus Frederick (1766)

Christiane and her sister received a comprehensive education in Mirow, including Latin, Greek and French and tutors such as Friderike Elisabeth von Grabow and Gottlob Burchard Genzmer. Her youngest sister Charlotte married George III of the United Kingdom, whilst two of her brothers, Adolphus and Charles, were regents of Mecklenburg-Strelitz. During his Grand Tour through Europe in 1761, she met John Ker, 3rd Duke of Roxburghe, but as her younger sister Charlotte was already married to George III, protocol forbade them from marrying, and ultimately both Christiane and Ker never married.

Christiane lived in Neustrelitz with her unmarried brother Adolphus Frederick IV and represented him on some occasions. She met Thomas Nugent there in 1767. Remaining in Neustrelitz, in her later life Christiane became a canoness of Herford Abbey. On 13 January 1766 she was made a Dame, 1st Class of the Order of St Catherine. The almond eyes seen in her portraits may indicate that she had a disease of the thyroid, possibly Graves' disease, which causes the eyeballs to expand. Adolphus Frederick died in June 1794 and was buried in the royal crypt at Mirow; Christiane followed on 31 August 1794. Fritz Reuter portrayed her as Prinzess Christel or Christel-Swester in his Dörchläuchting (1866).

== Ancestry ==
Ancestors of Duchess Christiane of Mecklenburg

16. John VII, Duke of Mecklenburg-Schwerin
8. Adolf Frederick I, Duke of Mecklenburg-Schwerin
17. Princess Sophie of Holstein-Gottorp
4. Adolf Frederick II, Duke of Mecklenburg-Strelitz
18. Julius Ernst, Duke of Brunswick-Dannenberg
9. Duchess Marie Katharina of Brunswick-Dannenberg
19. Countess Maria of Ostfriesland
2. Duke Charles Louis Frederick of Mecklenburg
20. Anton Günther I, Count of Schwarzburg-Sondershausen
10. Christian William I, Prince of Schwarzburg-Sondershausen
21. Countess Palatine Marie Magdalene of Zweibrücken-Birkenfeld
5. Princess Christiane Emilie of Schwarzburg-Sondershausen
22. Albert Frederick, Count of Barby-Mühlingen
11. Countess Antonie Sibylle of Barby-Mühlingen
23. Countess Sophie Ursula of Oldenburg
1. Duchess Christiane of Mecklenburg
24. Ernest I, Duke of Saxe-Gotha
12. Ernest, Duke of Saxe-Hildburghausen
25. Princess Elisabeth Sophie of Saxe-Altenburg
6. Ernest Frederick I, Duke of Saxe-Hildburghausen
26. Prince Georg Friedrich of Waldeck
13. Countess Sophie of Waldeck
27. Countess Elisabeth Charlotte of Nassau-Siegen
3. Princess Elisabeth Albertine of Saxe-Hildburghausen
28. George Albert I, Count of Erbach-Schönberg
14. George Louis I, Count of Erbach-Erbach
29. Countess Elisabeth Dorothea of Hohenlohe-Waldenburg-Schillingsfürst
7. Countess Sophia Albertine of Erbach-Erbach
30. Philip Dietrich, Count of Waldeck
15. Countess Amalia Katharina of Waldeck-Eisenberg
31. Countess Maria Magdalena of Nassau-Siegen

== Bibliography ==
- Grete Grewolls: Wer war wer in Mecklenburg und Vorpommern. Das Personenlexikon. Hinstorff Verlag, Rostock 2011, ISBN 978-3-356-01301-6, p. 1770.
