= Duke Ernest Gottlob of Mecklenburg =

German noble (1742–1814)

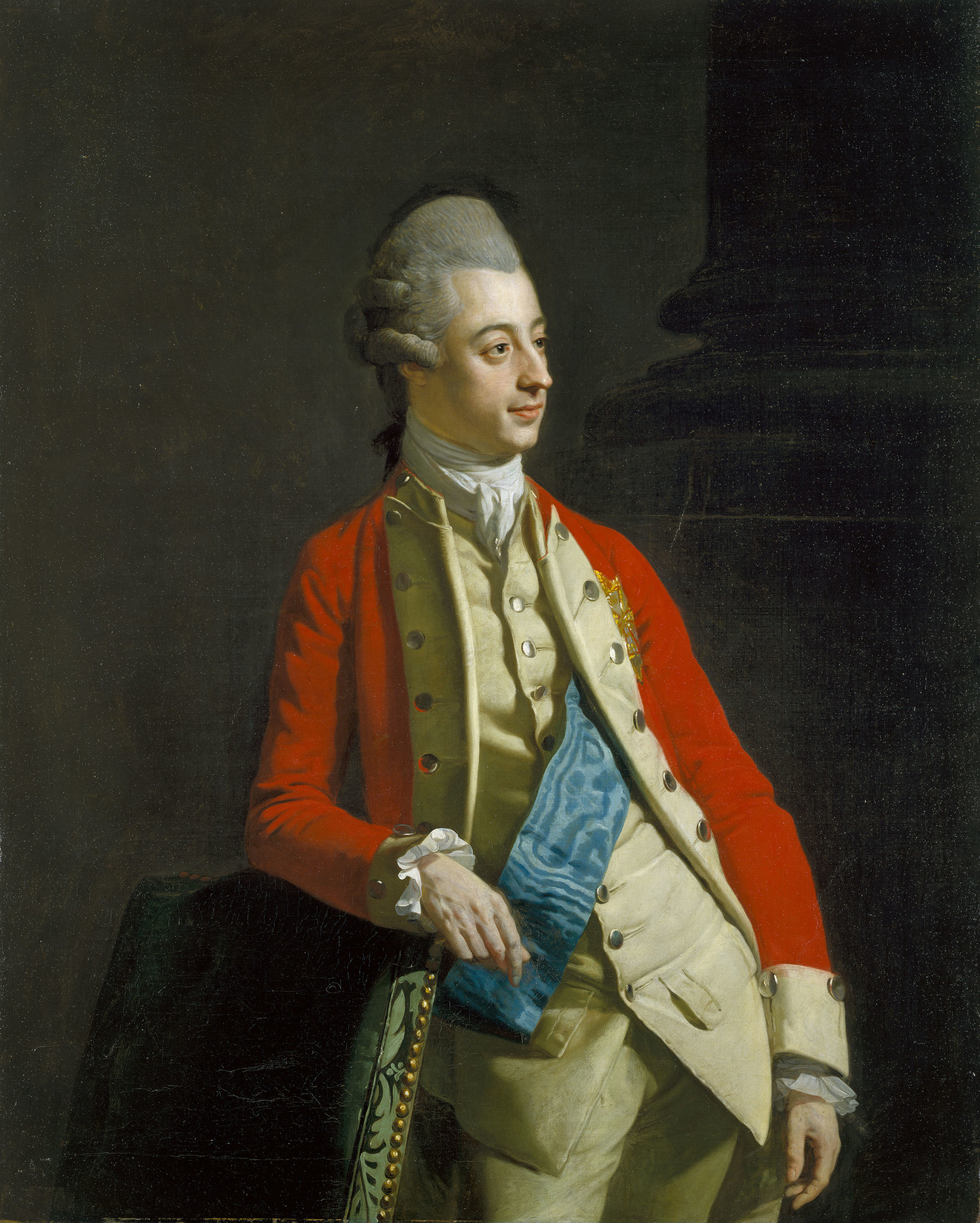
- Duke Ernest wearing the Polish Order of the White Eagle, by Johann Zoffany, c. 1772
- Born: 27 August 1742; Mirow, Mecklenburg-Strelitz
- Died: 27 January 1814 (aged 71)
- House: Mecklenburg-Strelitz
- Father: Duke Charles Louis Frederick of Mecklenburg
- Mother: Princess Elisabeth Albertine of Saxe-Hildburghausen

Duke Ernest Gottlob Albert of Mecklenburg (27 August 1742 – 27 January 1814) was a member of the House of Mecklenburg-Strelitz. As a younger son of Duke Charles Louis Frederick of Mecklenburg, Ernest was an elder brother of Queen Charlotte of the United Kingdom, who married King George III in 1761. Ernest followed his sister to England, where he unsuccessfully pursued marriage with the country's largest heiress, Mary Eleanor Bowes.

Enormous debt would later lead Ernest to attempt another marriage with a princess from the House of Holstein-Gottorp, but Charlotte managed to dissuade him. Ernest eventually became the military governor of Celle in the Electorate of Hanover, of which his brother-in-law George III was the head. Ernest died in 1814 at the age of 71 during the reign of George III but under the regency of his nephew George IV.

== Life ==
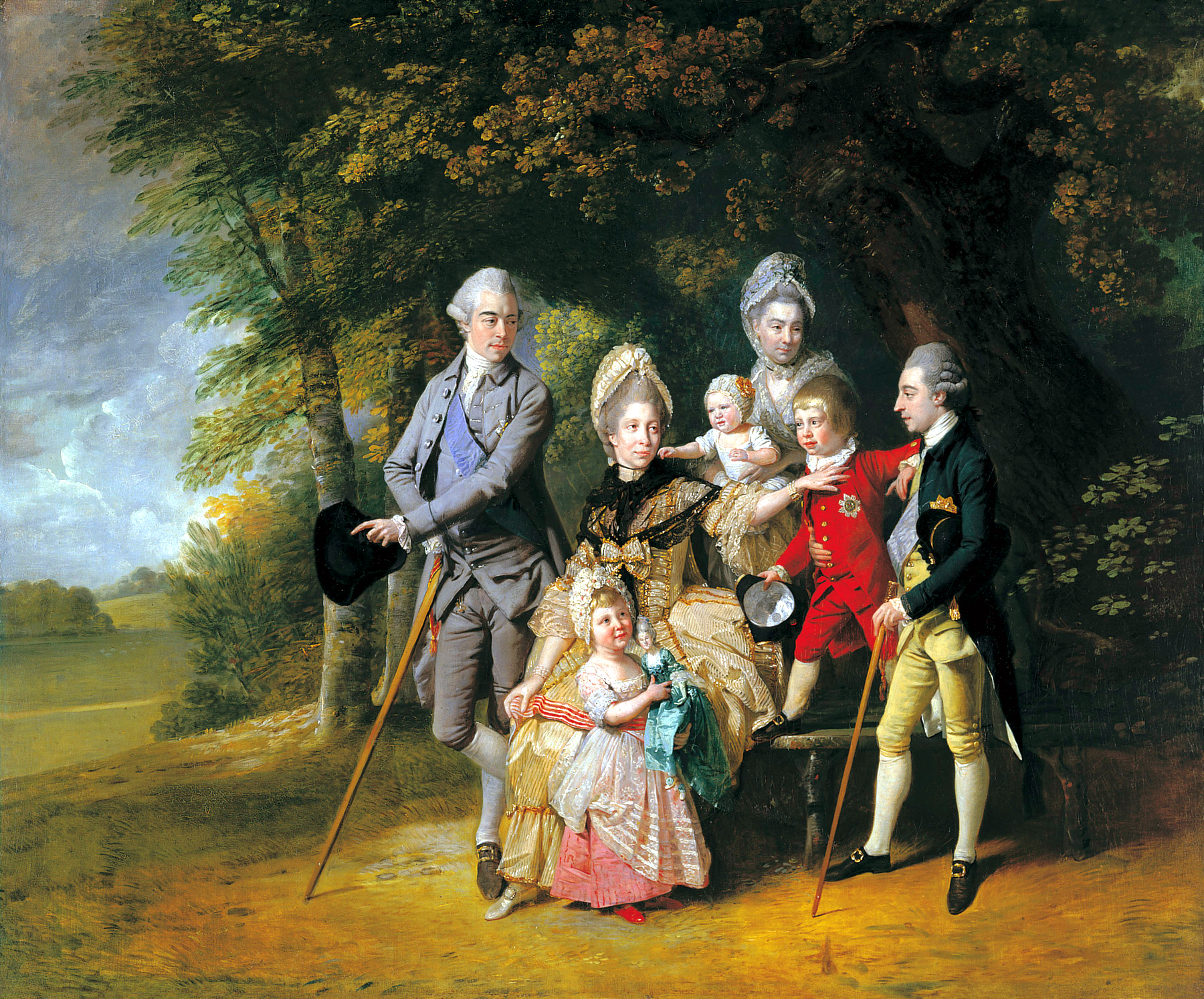
Ernest (left) with his brother Charles, sister Charlotte, and three of her children, most likely Charlotte, William, and baby Ernest (held by the royal nanny, Lady Charlotte Finch). Ernest had been baptised in July 1771, with his namesake, Prince Ernest, standing as godfather. Queen Charlotte with Members of Her Family by Johann Zoffany, c. 1771–72.

Ernest Gottlob Albert was the seventh child and third son of Duke Charles Louis Frederick of Mecklenburg and his wife Princess Elisabeth Albertine of Saxe-Hildburghausen. Ernest's younger sister Charlotte married George III of the United Kingdom in 1761, and Ernest followed her to London.

Ernest was described by novelist Sarah Scott as a "very pretty sort of man, with an agreeable person." In March 1762 Ernest was said, according to Scott, to have "fallen desperately in love with" Mary Eleanor Bowes, the richest heiress in Britain and possibly the richest in Europe. Scott speculated that were the marriage to take place, Ernest would become even richer than his elder brother Adolphus Frederick IV, Duke of Mecklenburg. However, King George III disallowed the marriage, as he disapproved of his brother-in-law marrying someone not of royal blood. Charlotte Papendiek, Queen Charlotte's wardrobe keeper, wrote many years later that the match would "have made him a Prince indeed; but as he was a younger brother, it might have disturbed the harmony of the house of Mecklenburg-Strelitz." Ernest does not appear in Mary's letters, and it does not seem likely that his affection was reciprocated.

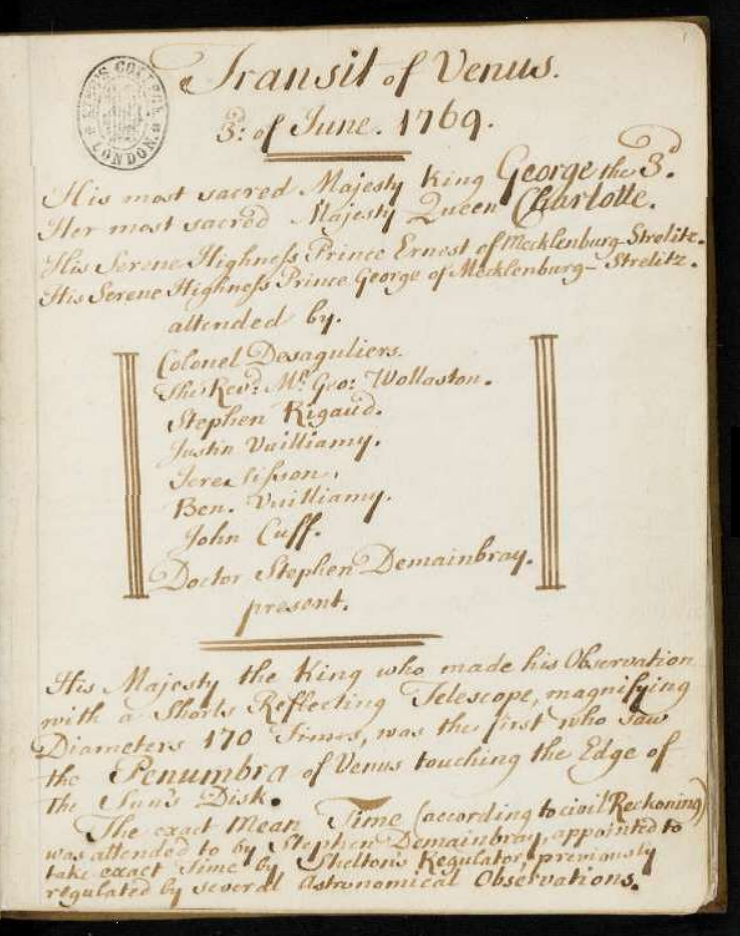
Extract from Observations on the Transit of Venus, a manuscript notebook from the collections of George III, showing Charlotte, Ernest and George among the observers.

In late 1768 at Queen's House (now Buckingham Palace), Ernest was inoculated alongside his nephew Prince William (the future King William IV) against smallpox. Ernest served as a sponsor and namesake for another nephew, Prince Ernest Augustus. The following year Ernest and his brother George attended observations of the 1769 Transit of Venus at the King's Observatory in Richmond-upon-Thames. Charlotte remained close to all of her German relatives while married. Like his brother Charles, Ernest benefited from Charlotte's marriage and gained promotion within the Hanoverian Army, of which George III was the head. Ernest eventually became the military governor of Celle, in Hanover, where he welcomed George III's exiled sister Queen Caroline Matilda upon the end of her marriage to Christian VII of Denmark.

In 1782 Ernest attempted to enter into a marriage with a princess from the House of Holstein-Gottorp in an effort to pay his numerous debts. However, both the fact that he was a third son and the uncle of a male heir limited his appeal to potential dynastic alliances. Charlotte advised her brother to drop the match, as the dowry of the princess in question would not be enough to settle his debts; furthermore, neither she nor her husband would be able to help with his finances. She hoped that Christian VII of Denmark would provide a large dowry, as the princess was a member of his house, but concluded that no one would blame Ernest if he stopped pursuing the marriage. This frank advice was later praised by their brother Charles, and Ernest never married. He died on 27 January 1814 at the age of 71.

== Honours ==
- Order of the White Eagle of Poland

== Ancestry ==
Ancestors of Duke Ernest Gottlob of Mecklenburg

16. John VII, Duke of Mecklenburg-Schwerin
8. Adolf Frederick I, Duke of Mecklenburg-Schwerin
17. Princess Sophie of Holstein-Gottorp
4. Adolf Frederick II, Duke of Mecklenburg-Strelitz
18. Julius Ernst, Duke of Brunswick-Dannenberg
9. Duchess Marie Katharina of Brunswick-Dannenberg
19. Countess Maria of East Frisia
2. Duke Charles Louis Frederick of Mecklenburg
20. Anton Günther I, Count of Schwarzburg-Sondershausen
10. Christian William I, Prince of Schwarzburg-Sondershausen
21. Countess Palatine Marie Magdalene of Birkenfeld
5. Princess Christiane Emilie of Schwarzburg-Sondershausen
22. Albert Frederick, Count of Barby-Mühlingen
11. Countess Antonie Sibylle of Barby-Mühlingen
23. Countess Sophie Ursula of Oldenburg
1. Duke Ernest Gottlob of Mecklenburg
24. Ernest I, Duke of Saxe-Gotha
12. Ernest, Duke of Saxe-Hildburghausen
25. Princess Elisabeth Sophie of Saxe-Altenburg
6. Ernest Frederick I, Duke of Saxe-Hildburghausen
26. Prince Georg Friedrich of Waldeck
13. Countess Sophie of Waldeck
27. Countess Elisabeth Charlotte of Nassau-Siegen
3. Princess Elisabeth Albertine of Saxe-Hildburghausen
28. George Albert I, Count of Erbach-Schönberg
14. George Louis I, Count of Erbach-Erbach
29. Countess Elisabeth Dorothea of Hohenlohe-Waldenburg-Schillingsfürst
7. Countess Sophia Albertine of Erbach-Erbach
30. Philip Dietrich, Count of Waldeck
15. Countess Amalia Katharina of Waldeck-Eisenberg
31. Countess Maria Magdalena of Nassau-Siegen

== Sources ==
- Grewolls, Grete (2011). Wer war wer in Mecklenburg und Vorpommern. Das Personenlexikon (in German). Rostock: Hinstorff Verlag. p. 2580. ISBN 978-3-356-01301-6.

=== Bibliography ===
- Black, Jeremy (2006). George III: America's Last King. Yale University Press. ISBN 0-300-11732-9.
- Campbell Orr, Clarissa (2004). "Charlotte of Mecklenburg-Strelitz, Queen of Great Britain and Electress of Hanover: Northern Dynasties and the Northern Republic of Letters". In Campbell Orr, Clarissa (ed.). Queenship in Europe 1660-1815: The Role of the Consort. Cambridge University Press. pp. 368–402. ISBN 0-521-81422-7.
- Moore, Wendy (2009). Wedlock: The True Story of the Disastrous Marriage and Remarkable Divorce of Mary Eleanor Bowes, Countess of Strathmore. New York: Three Rivers Press.
- Papendiek, Charlotte (1887). Court and private life in the time of Queen Charlotte: Being the Journals of Mrs. Papendiek, Assistant Keeper of the Wardrobe and Reader to Her Majesty, Volume 1. London: Spottiswoode and Co. ISBN 1-143-96208-7.
- Urban, Sylvanus (1852). The gentleman's magazine, Volume 37. London: J.B. Nichols and Son.
- Wilkins, William Henry (1904). A queen of tears: Caroline Matilda, queen of Denmark and Norway and Princess of Great Britain and Ireland, Volume 2. London: Longmans Green and Co. ISBN 1-153-93838-3.
