= Duke George Augustus of Mecklenburg =

German military officer (1748–1785)

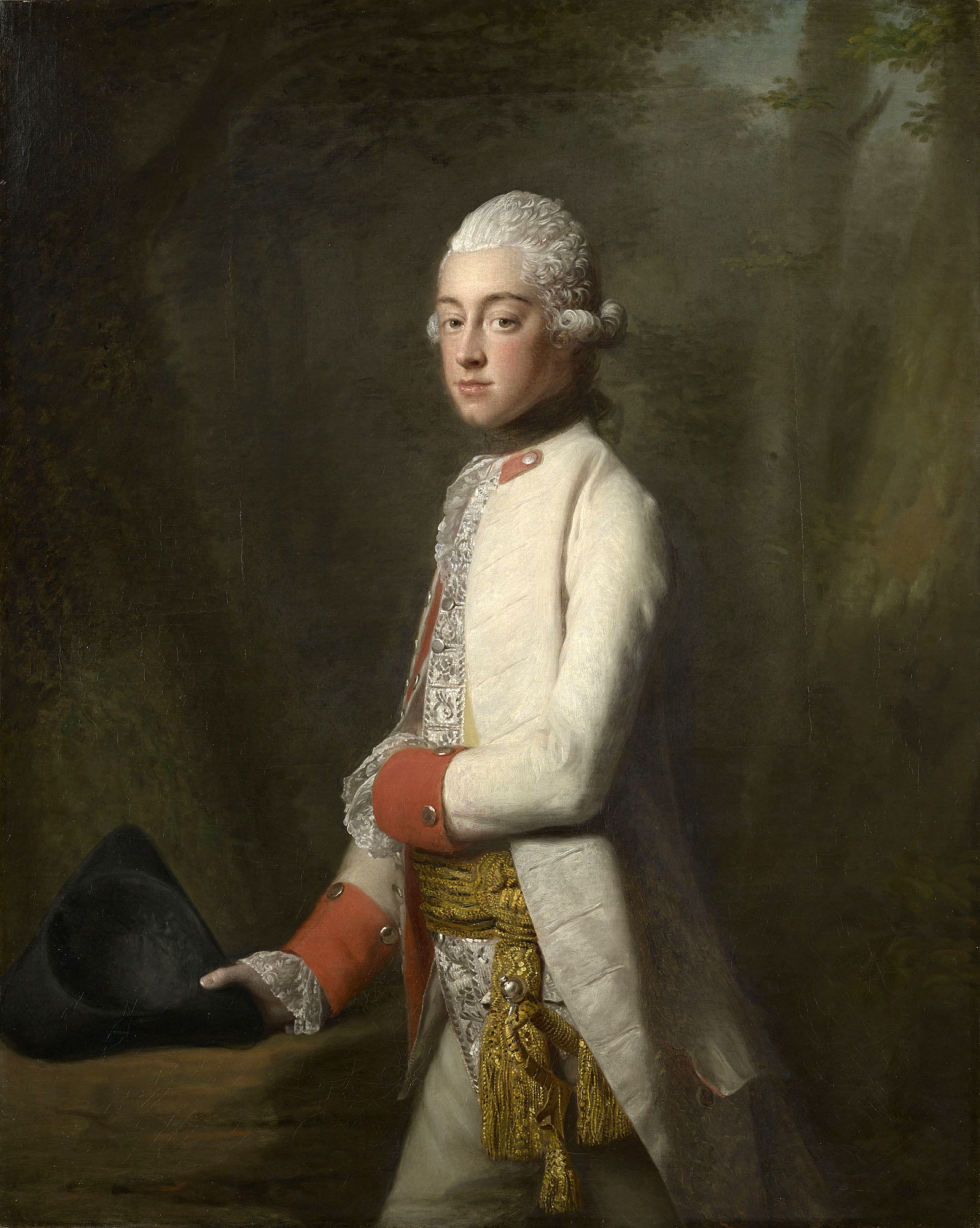
- Portrait by Allan Ramsay
- Born: 16 August 1748; Mirow
- Died: 14 November 1785 (aged 37); Tyrnau
- House: Mecklenburg-Strelitz
- Father: Duke Charles Louis Frederick of Mecklenburg
- Mother: Princess Elisabeth Albertine of Saxe-Hildburghausen

Duke George Augustus of Mecklenburg (German: Georg August; 16 August 1748 – 14 November 1785) was a German nobleman, sailor, and soldier.

== Early life ==
Duke George Augustus was born in Mirow the youngest child of Duke Charles Louis Frederick of Mecklenburg and his wife Princess Elisabeth Albertine of Saxe-Hildburghausen. His grandfather Adolf Frederick II, Duke of Mecklenburg-Strelitz was the founder of the House of Mecklenburg-Strelitz.

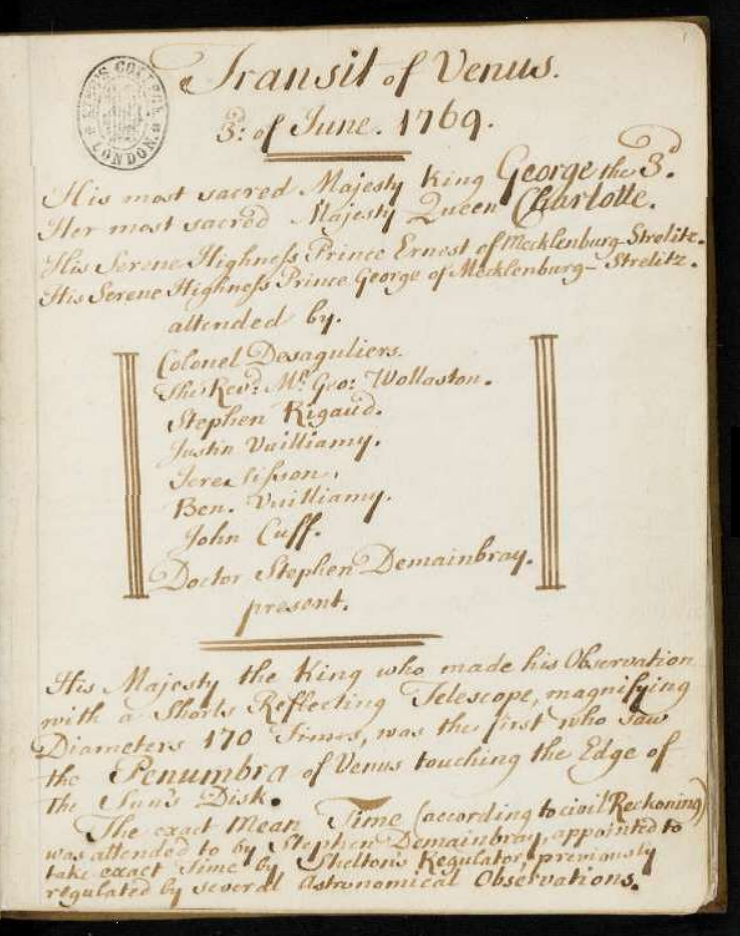
Extract from Observations on the Transit of Venus, a manuscript notebook from the collections of George III, showing George and his brother Ernest among the observers.

On 8 September 1761 his sister Charlotte married the King of Great Britain, George III. Following the marriage George Augustus moved to the Kingdom of Great Britain and after learning the English language volunteered to serve in the Royal Navy. He spent two years serving in the Navy before he was forced to leave due to illness brought on by the climate and life at sea. During his time in Great Britain George Augustus became a Doctor of Laws and attended observations of the 1769 Transit of Venus at the King's Observatory in Richmond-upon-Thames.

George Augustus developed a love of Britain and though a firm Protestant himself, he disapproved of the country's discrimination and intolerance of Catholics.

== Imperial service ==
After recovering from his illness George Augustus spent some time studying at the University of Leiden before being invited to enter into the service of the Queen-Empress Maria Theresa of Austria. He accepted the offer and was made a lieutenant-colonel. He was promoted to rank of colonel after a fellow officer complained to Empress Maria Theresa that Duke George Augustus associated with socially inferior officers and that he had forgot that he was a German prince. The Empress who was only concerned if George Augustus had forgotten that he was Lieutenant-Colonel in her service, responded by promoting him to the rank of Colonel after the complaining officer admitted he was a good officer as she was only interested that he did his duty as an officer in her service.

He continued his rise up the ranks and a short while after being made a colonel he was made 'General of Horse' and was decorated with various honours. In 1780 he was promoted to the rank of brigadier-general and was appointed inspector of two carabinier regiments. He won the praise of Austrian field marshal Baron Ernst Gideon von Laudon in 1782 after carrying out army manœuvres in Prague with 50,000 infantry and cavalry soldiers.

Duke George Augustus never married and died in Tyrnau in the Kingdom of Hungary at the age of 37. He was buried in Mirow in 1852.

== Ancestry ==
Ancestors of Duke George Augustus of Mecklenburg

16. John VII, Duke of Mecklenburg-Schwerin
8. Adolf Frederick I, Duke of Mecklenburg-Schwerin
17. Princess Sophie of Holstein-Gottorp
4. Adolf Frederick II, Duke of Mecklenburg-Strelitz
18. Julius Ernst, Duke of Brunswick-Dannenberg
9. Duchess Marie Katharina of Brunswick-Dannenberg
19. Countess Maria of East Frisia
2. Duke Charles Louis Frederick of Mecklenburg
20. Anton Günther I, Count of Schwarzburg-Sondershausen
10. Christian William I, Prince of Schwarzburg-Sondershausen
21. Countess Palatine Marie Magdalene of Birkenfeld
5. Princess Christiane Emilie of Schwarzburg-Sondershausen
22. Albert Frederick, Count of Barby-Mühlingen
11. Countess Antonie Sibylle of Barby-Mühlingen
23. Countess Sophie Ursula of Oldenburg
1. Duke George Augustus of Mecklenburg
24. Ernest I, Duke of Saxe-Gotha
12. Ernest, Duke of Saxe-Hildburghausen
25. Princess Elisabeth Sophie of Saxe-Altenburg
6. Ernest Frederick I, Duke of Saxe-Hildburghausen
26. Prince Georg Friedrich of Waldeck
13. Countess Sophie of Waldeck
27. Countess Elisabeth Charlotte of Nassau-Siegen
3. Princess Elisabeth Albertine of Saxe-Hildburghausen
28. George Albert, Count of Erbach-Erbach
14. George Louis I, Count of Erbach-Erbach
29. Countess Elisabeth Dorothea of Hohenlohe-Waldenburg-Schillingsfürst
7. Countess Sophia Albertine of Erbach-Erbach
30. Philip Dietrich, Count of Waldeck
15. Countess Amalia Katharina of Waldeck-Eisenberg
31. Countess Maria Magdalena of Nassau-Siegen
