= Duke George =

Duke George may refer to:

- Grand Duke George of Russia (disambiguation), multiple people
- George Plantagenet, Duke of Clarence (1449–1478), brother of Edward IV and Richard III
- George, Duke of Saxony (1471–1539)
- Duke George of Oldenburg (1784–1812)
- George Plantagenet, Duke of Bedford (1477–1479), son of Edward IV
- George Villiers, 1st Duke of Buckingham (1592–1628), English noble
- George FitzRoy, Duke of Northumberland (1665–1716), illegitimate son of Charles II
- Duke George Augustus of Mecklenburg (1748–1785)
- Duke Georg Alexander of Mecklenburg-Strelitz (1859–1909)
- Georg Alexander, Duke of Mecklenburg (1899–1963)
- George II, Duke of Saxe-Meiningen (1826–1914)
