= Bassewitz =

Bassewitz or von Bassewitz is a German surname associated with the noble Bassewitz family. Notable people with the surname include:

- Georg-Henning Graf von Bassewitz-Behr, Higher SS and Police Leader, SS-Gruppenführer
- Gerdt von Bassewitz (1878–1923), German lieutenant and playwright
- Horst von Bassewitz (1932–2020), German architect
- Ina Marie von Bassewitz-Levetzow (1888–1973), German aristocrat
- Joachim Otto von Bassewitz (1686–1733), German politician
- Joachim von Bassewitz (administrator), German administrator, jurist and diplomat
- Sabine Elisabeth Oelgard von Bassewitz, German writer

== See also ==
- Isaac Bashevis Singer
