= Princess Elisabeth Albertine of Saxe-Hildburghausen =

Elisabeth Albertine of Saxe-Hildburghausen
- Duchess Charles Louis Frederick of Mecklenburg-Strelitz; Princess of Mirow
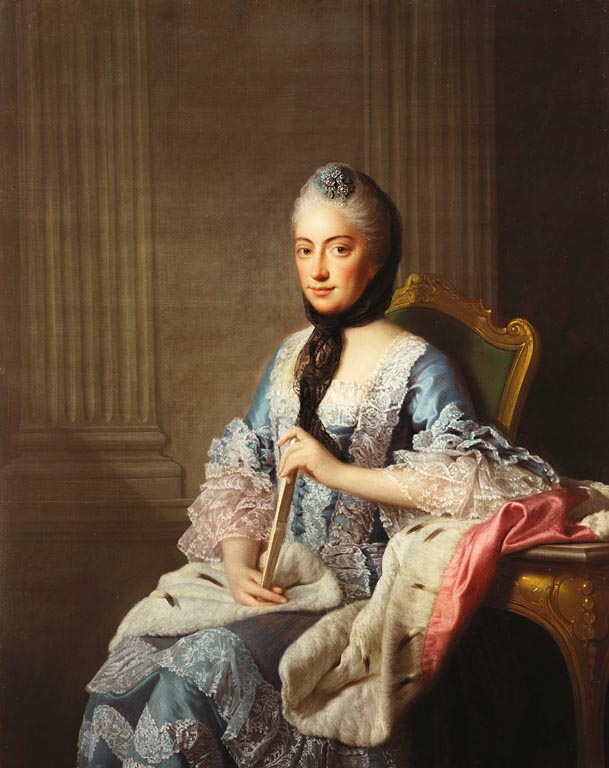
- Portrait by Allan Ramsay
- Born: 4 August 1713; Hildburghausen, Duchy of Saxe-Gotha-Altenburg, Holy Roman Empire
- Died: 29 June 1761 (aged 47); Neustrelitz, Duchy of Mecklenburg-Strelitz, Holy Roman Empire
- Burial: Johanniterkirche, Mirow
- Spouse: Duke Charles Louis Frederick of Mecklenburg-Strelitz, Prince of Mirow (m. 1735; died 1752)
- Issue: Duchess Christiane; Duchess Karoline; Adolphus Frederick IV, Duke of Mecklenburg-Strelitz; Duchess Elizabeth Christine; Duchess Sophie Louise; Charles II, Grand Duke of Mecklenburg-Strelitz; Duke Ernst Gottlob; Charlotte, Queen of the United Kingdom; Duke Gotthelf; Duke George Augustus
- House: Saxe-Hildburghausen
- Father: Ernest Frederick I, Duke of Saxe-Hildburghausen
- Mother: Countess Sophia Albertine of Erbach-Erbach

Elisabeth Albertine of Saxe-Hildburghausen (4 August 1713 – 29 June 1761) was a Duchess of Mecklenburg-Strelitz. She served as regent for her son after the deaths in 1752–1753 of her husband and brother-in-law of, respectively, the ducal appanage of Mirow and of the Duchy of Mecklenburg-Strelitz.

== Biography ==
Elisabeth Albertine was a daughter of Ernest Frederick I, Duke of Saxe-Hildburghausen (1681–1724), and his wife, Countess Sophia Albertine of Erbach-Erbach (1683–1742).

On 5 February 1735, Elisabeth married Duke Charles Louis Frederick of Mecklenburg-Mirow (23 February 1707 – 5 June 1752) at Eisfeld, the youngest son of Adolphus Frederick II, Duke of Mecklenburg-Strelitz, and half-brother to Adolphus Frederick III. They became the parents of ten children.

=== Regency ===
The death of her childless brother-in-law on 11 December 1752, six months after she was widowed, left Albertine as regent of both men's duchies on behalf of her eldest son, Adolphus Frederick IV, until he attained his majority at the age of 14 on 17 January 1753. During that brief period she ruled the Strelitz duchies under the protection of George II of Great Britain, warding off encroachments from Duke Christian Ludwig II, ruler of the Schwerin branch of the House of Mecklenburg.

She died in 1761, shortly before the marriage of her daughter Sophia Charlotte to King George III of Great Britain, and was buried at the ducal crypt in Mirow.

== Issue ==
Elisabeth had ten children, including the future Queen Charlotte, consort to King George III of the United Kingdom, six of whom survived to adulthood. Through her daughter Charlotte, Elisabeth Albertine is the ancestor of every British monarch beginning with George IV, who ascended the throne of the United Kingdom in 1820.

Name	Birth	Death	Notes
Christiane Sophie Albertine	6 December 1735	31 August 1794	Never married, no issue
Caroline	22 December 1736		died in infancy
Adolphus Frederick	5 May 1738	2 June 1794	Never married, no issue
Elisabeth Christine	13 April 1739	9 April 1741	died in infancy
Sophie Louise	16 May 1740	31 January 1742	died in infancy
Charles Louis Frederick	10 October 1741	6 November 1816	(1) Princess Friederike of Hesse-Darmstadt, and had issue; (2) Princess Charlotte of Hesse-Darmstadt, and had issue.
Ernst Gottlob Albert	27 August 1742	27 January 1814	Never married, no issue.
Sophie Charlotte	19 May 1744	17 November 1818	Married King George III of the United Kingdom, and had issue.
Gotthelf	29 October 1745	31 October 1745	died in infancy
George Augustus	16 August 1748	14 November 1785	Never married, no issue.

== Ancestry ==
Ancestors of Princess Elisabeth Albertine of Saxe-Hildburghausen

8. Ernest I, Duke of Saxe-Gotha
4. Ernest, Duke of Saxe-Hildburghausen
9. Princess Elisabeth Sophie of Saxe-Altenburg
2. Ernest Frederick I, Duke of Saxe-Hildburghausen
10. Prince Georg Friedrich of Waldeck
5. Countess Sophie Henriette of Waldeck
11. Countess Elisabeth Charlotte of Nassau-Siegen
1. Princess Elisabeth Albertine of Saxe-Hildburghausen
12. George Albert I, Count of Erbach-Schönberg
6. George Louis I, Count of Erbach-Erbach
13. Countess Elisabeth Dorothea of Hohenlohe-Waldenburg-Schillingsfürst
3. Countess Sophia Albertine of Erbach-Erbach
14. Philip Dietrich, Count of Waldeck
7. Countess Amalia Katharina of Waldeck
15. Countess Maria Magdalena of Nassau-Siegen
