= Adolphus Frederick IV =

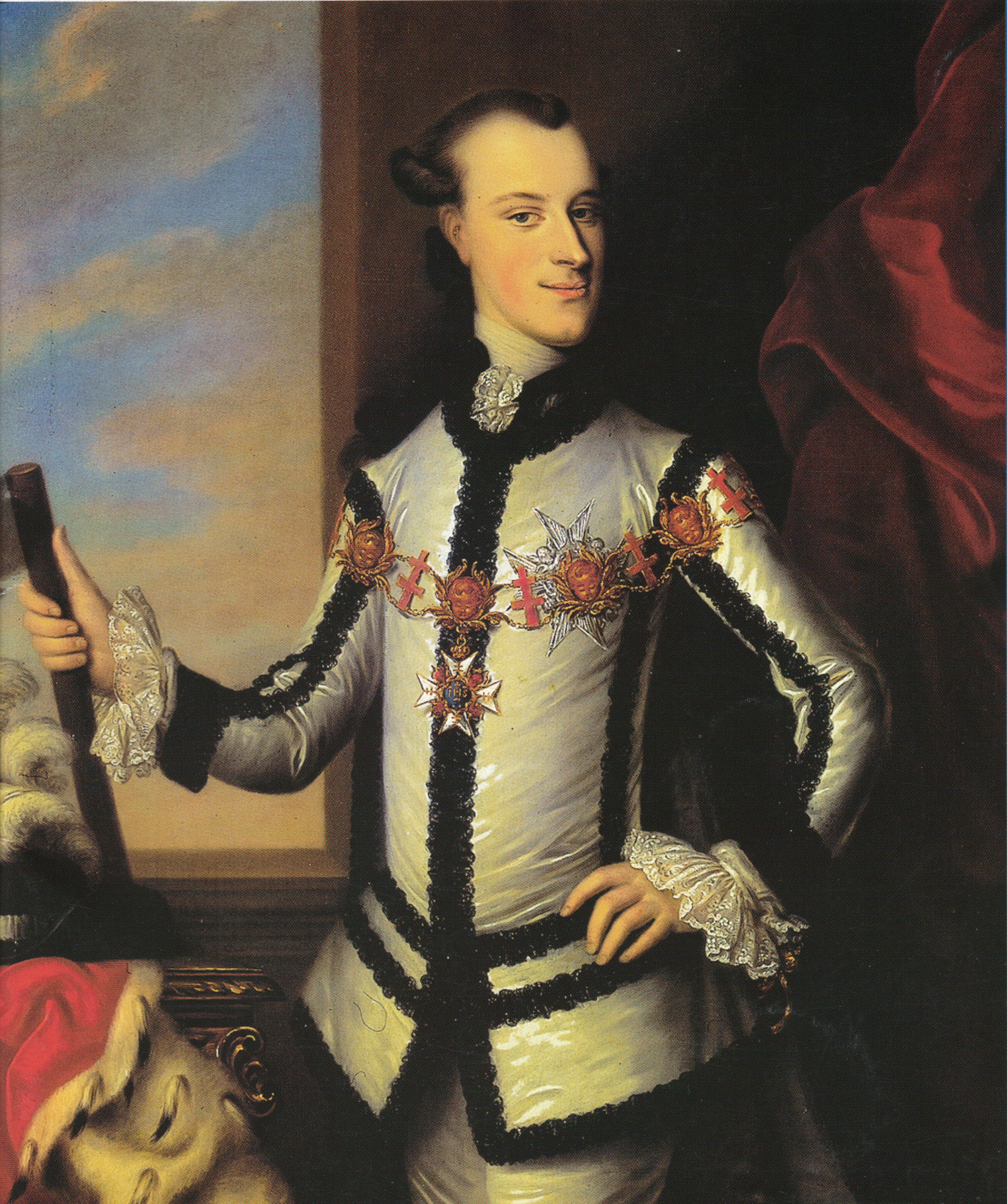
- Portrait of Adolf Frederick IV, 18th century

Duke of Mecklenburg-Strelitz
- Reign: 11 December 1752 – 2 June 1794
- Predecessor: Adolphus Frederick III
- Successor: Charles II
- Born: 5 May 1738; Mirow
- Died: 2 June 1794 (aged 56); Neustrelitz
Names
- German: Adolphus Frederick
- House: House of Mecklenburg
- Father: Duke Charles Louis Frederick of Mecklenburg
- Mother: Princess Elisabeth Albertine of Saxe-Hildburghausen

Adolphus Frederick IV (German: Adolf Friedrich IV; 5 May 1738 – 2 June 1794) was Duke of Mecklenburg-Strelitz from 1752 to his death in 1794.

== Biography ==
He was born in Mirow to Duke Charles Louis Frederick of Mecklenburg and his wife Princess Elisabeth Albertine of Saxe-Hildburghausen. His father was the second son of Adolphus Frederick II, Duke of Mecklenburg.

He was the heir presumptive of Mecklenburg-Strelitz from the death of his father on 5 June 1752 until he succeeded his uncle Duke Adolphus Frederick III on 11 December 1752. In the early years after 1753, his mother Princess Elisabeth Albertine of Saxe-Hildburghausen served as regent, as her son was only 14 years old. They were additionally under the protection of King George II of Great Britain.

In 1753, he studied at the University of Greifswald.

In 1761, his sister Charlotte married King George III of Great Britain.

In 1764, he was installed as a member of the Order of the Garter.

Adolphus Frederick never married. Following his death at Neustrelitz in 1794, he was succeeded by his brother Charles.

== Ancestry ==
Ancestors of Adolphus Frederick IV

16. John VII, Duke of Mecklenburg-Schwerin
8. Adolf Frederick I, Duke of Mecklenburg-Schwerin
17. Princess Sophia of Schleswig-Holstein-Gottorp
4. Adolf Frederick II, Duke of Mecklenburg-Strelitz
18. Julius Ernst, Duke of Brunswick-Dannenberg
9. Duchess Marie Katharina of Brunswick-Dannenberg
19. Countess Maria of East Frisia
2. Duke Charles Louis Frederick of Mecklenburg
20. Anton Günther I, Count of Schwarzburg-Sondershausen
10. Christian William I, Prince of Schwarzburg-Sondershausen
21. Countess Palatine Marie Magdalene of Birkenfeld
5. Princess Christiane Emilie of Schwarzburg-Sondershausen
22. Albert Frederick, Count of Barby-Mühlingen
11. Countess Antonie Sibylle of Barby-Mühlingen
23. Countess Sophie Ursula of Oldenburg
1. Adolphus Frederick IV, Duke of Mecklenburg-Strelitz
24. Ernest I, Duke of Saxe-Gotha
12. Ernest, Duke of Saxe-Hildburghausen
25. Princess Elisabeth Sophie of Saxe-Altenburg
6. Ernest Frederick I, Duke of Saxe-Hildburghausen
26. Prince Georg Friedrich of Waldeck
13. Countess Sophie of Waldeck
27. Countess Elisabeth Charlotte of Nassau-Siegen
3. Princess Elisabeth Albertine of Saxe-Hildburghausen
28. George Albert I, Count of Erbach-Schönberg
14. George Louis I, Count of Erbach-Erbach
29. Countess Elisabeth Dorothea of Hohenlohe-Waldenburg-Schillingsfürst
7. Countess Sophia Albertine of Erbach-Erbach
30. Philip Dietrich, Count of Waldeck
15. Countess Amalia Katharina of Waldeck-Eisenberg
31. Countess Maria Magdalena of Nassau-Siegen

Adolphus Frederick IV House of Mecklenburg-Strelitz Cadet branch of the House of Mecklenburg Born: 5 May 1738 Died: 2 June 1794
Regnal titles
Preceded by Adolphus Frederick III	Duke of Mecklenburg-Strelitz; 1752–1794	Succeeded by Charles II
