= Joachim Otto von Bassewitz =

German politician (1686–1733)

Joachim Otto von Bassewitz or Bassewiß (8 February 1686 - 10 March 1733) was a statesman and politician from the Holy Roman Empire. He was a Geheimrat of Holstein-Gottorp, president of the chamber and bailiff (amtmann) at Kiel.

== Life ==
From the old Mecklenburg family of Bassewitz, his parents were the landrat Philipp Cuno von Bassewitz and Catharina Oelgard von Lehsten. Joachim's first wife was Catharina Ilsabe von Bassewitz (1693–1717), with whom he had a daughter (the future writer Sabine Elisabeth Oelgard von Bassewitz) and a son (Henning Friedrich Graf von Bassewitz) who predeceased him. After Catharina's death he married again in 1720 to Adelheid Benedicte von Ahlefeldt, daughter of Benedikt von Ahlefeldt and Elisabeth von Moltke, with whom he had one child, who also predeceased him.

His first role was as kammerjunker to the Principality of Naumburg, then Kammerherr to Saxony and Poland (then in personal union). In between those two offices he served as ambassador to the Prussian court in Berlin and later as Amtmann von Bordesholm, Kiel and Neumünster. Finally Charles Frederick, Duke of Holstein-Gottorp made him a Geheimrat and chamber president, and Schlosshauptmann in Kiel. He was also Geheimrat to the Bishop of Lübeck in Eutin. He was Herr of the estates of Dalwitz, Stierow, Stechow and Holz-Lübchin in Mecklenburg. Bassewitz was a recipient of the Order of Alexander Nevsky.

== Bibliography ==
- (in German) Schleswig-Holsteinische Ritterschaft: Beitrag zur Adelsgeschichte Deutschlands und Dänemarks, Seite 16 (Schleswig 1869)
- (in German) Adolph Graf von Bassewitz: Aus dem Leben des Reichsgrafen Henning Friedrich von Bassewitz mit einigen Nachrichten über die Familie Bassewitz der wendischen Linie., Briefwechsel mit seinem Bruder Henning Friedrich Graf von Bassewitz
- (in German) Hubertus Neuschäffer: Henning Friedrich Graf von Bassewitz, Schwerin 1999, u.a. Seiten 112–116, 140–142.
- (in German) Peter Friedrich Arpe: Das verwirrte Cimbrien, Frankfurt, Leipzig 1774
