= Duke Charles Louis Frederick of Mecklenburg =

Charles Louis Frederick
- Prince of Mirow
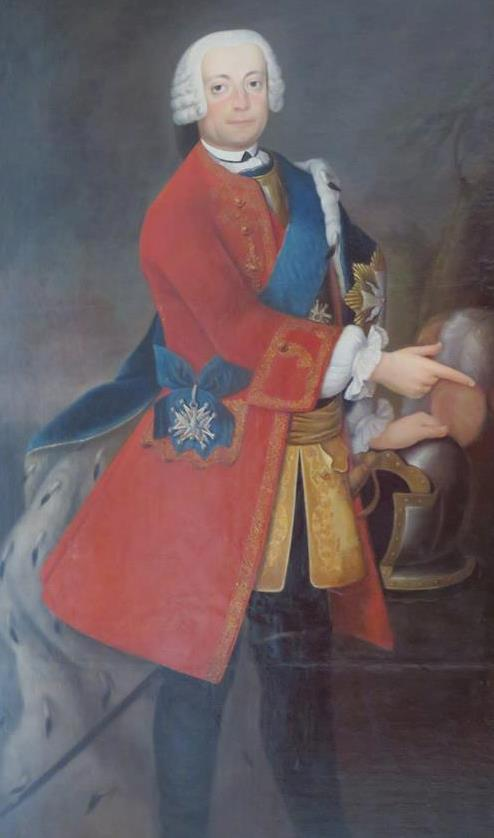
- Born: 23 February 1708; Neustrelitz, Duchy of Mecklenburg-Strelitz, Holy Roman Empire
- Died: 4 June 1752 (aged 44); Mirow, Duchy of Mecklenburg-Strelitz, Holy Roman Empire
- Burial: Johanniterkirche, Mirow
- Spouse: Princess Elisabeth Albertine of Saxe-Hildburghausen (m. 1735)
- Issue: Duchess Christiane; Duchess Karoline; Adolphus Frederick IV, Duke of Mecklenburg-Strelitz; Duchess Elizabeth Christine; Duchess Sophie Louise; Charles II, Grand Duke of Mecklenburg-Strelitz; Duke Ernst Gottlob; Charlotte, Queen of the United Kingdom; Duke Gotthelf; Duke George Augustus
- House: Mecklenburg-Strelitz
- Father: Adolphus Frederick II, Duke of Mecklenburg-Strelitz
- Mother: Princess Christiane Emilie of Schwarzburg-Sondershausen

Duke Charles Louis Frederick of Mecklenburg-Strelitz (23 February 1708 – 4 June 1752) was a member of the Strelitz branch of the House of Mecklenburg. He was the father of Queen Charlotte of the United Kingdom and Hanover and Duke Adolphus Frederick IV of Mecklenburg-Strelitz. He was styled as the Prince of Mirow (Prinz von Mirow). He never succeeded to rule the Duchy of Mecklenburg-Strelitz, as he predeceased his father and half-brother, the latter being succeeded by Charles' son, Adolphus Frederick, in 1752.

== Life ==
Charles was born in Strelitz on 23 February 1708, the second son and youngest child of Adolphus Frederick II, Duke of Mecklenburg-Strelitz. His mother, Princess Christiane Emilie of Schwarzburg-Sondershausen, was the third wife of his father. Charles had one half-brother and one surviving half-sister, the children of his father's first marriage. He also had one full sister at the time of his birth, but she died as an infant when Charles was less than one year old.

Charles's father died when he was only three months old. His half-brother succeeded their father as Adolphus Frederick III, whereas Charles, as the younger son, inherited the commanderies of Mirow and Nemerow. Charles's mother retired to the estate of Mirow upon the death of her husband, and Charles was raised there. He later attended the University of Greifswald in Pomerania.

In keeping with the custom of the times, Charles set out on a Grand Tour of Europe in 1726, aged 18. He played the transverse flute well, and made it one of the aims of the tour to improve his knowledge and skill in music. After visiting Geneva, Italy and France, he went to Vienna and briefly entered the service of the Holy Roman Emperor as a Lieutenant Colonel before returning to Mirow.

After leaving the Army, Charles lived with his family in the castle of Mirow, managing his estates and attending to the education of his children. He lived at Mirow until his death there at the age of 44.

When his older half-brother, Adolphus Frederick III, died in December 1752 without a male heir, Charles's son Adolf Friedrich succeeded as the next Duke of Mecklenburg-Strelitz, reigning as Adolphus Frederick IV.

== Family ==
Charles was married on 5 February 1735 in Eisfeld to Princess Elisabeth Albertine of Saxe-Hildburghausen, daughter of Ernest Frederick I, Duke of Saxe-Hildburghausen. She was regent to her son in 1752 and played a major part in the struggle for the throne at that time, with protection from King George II assisting against threats from Duke Christian Ludwig II, ruler of the Schwerin branch of the House of Mecklenburg.

They had ten children, six of whom survived into adulthood:

Name	Birth	Death	Notes
Christiane Sophie Albertine	6 December 1735	31 August 1794	Never married, no issue
Caroline	22 December 1736		died in infancy
Adolphus Frederick	5 May 1738	2 June 1794	Never married, no issue
Elisabeth Christine	13 April 1739	9 April 1741	died in infancy
Sophie Louise	16 May 1740	31 January 1742	died in infancy
Charles Louis Frederick	10 October 1741	6 November 1816	(1) Princess Friederike of Hesse-Darmstadt, and had issue; (2) Princess Charlotte of Hesse-Darmstadt, and had issue.
Ernst Gottlob Albert	27 August 1742	27 January 1814	Never married, no issue.
Sophie Charlotte	19 May 1744	17 November 1818	Married King George III of the United Kingdom, and had issue.
Gotthelf	29 October 1745	31 October 1745	died in infancy
George Augustus	16 August 1748	14 November 1785	Never married, no issue.

Through his daughter Charlotte, Charles Louis Frederick is the ancestor of every British monarch beginning with George IV, who ascended the throne of the United Kingdom in 1820.

== Ancestry ==
Ancestors of Duke Charles Louis Frederick of Mecklenburg

8. John VII, Duke of Mecklenburg-Schwerin
4. Adolphus Frederick I
9. Sophia of Holstein-Gottorp
2. Adolphus Frederick II
10. Julius Ernst, Duke of Brunswick-Dannenberg
5. Maria Katharina of Brunswick-Dannenberg
11. Maria of East Frisia
1. Duke Charles Louis Frederick of Mecklenburg
12. Anton Günther I, Count of Schwarzburg-Sondershausen
6. Christian William I, Prince of Schwarzburg-Sondershausen
13. Maria of Pfalz-Zweibrücken
3. Christiane Emilie of Schwarzburg-Sondershausen
14. Albert Frederick of Barby-Mühlingen
7. Antonie Sybille of Barby-Mühlingen
15. Sophie Ursula of Oldenburg-Delmenhorst
