= Queen Charlotte with Members of Her Family =

Painting by Johann Zoffany

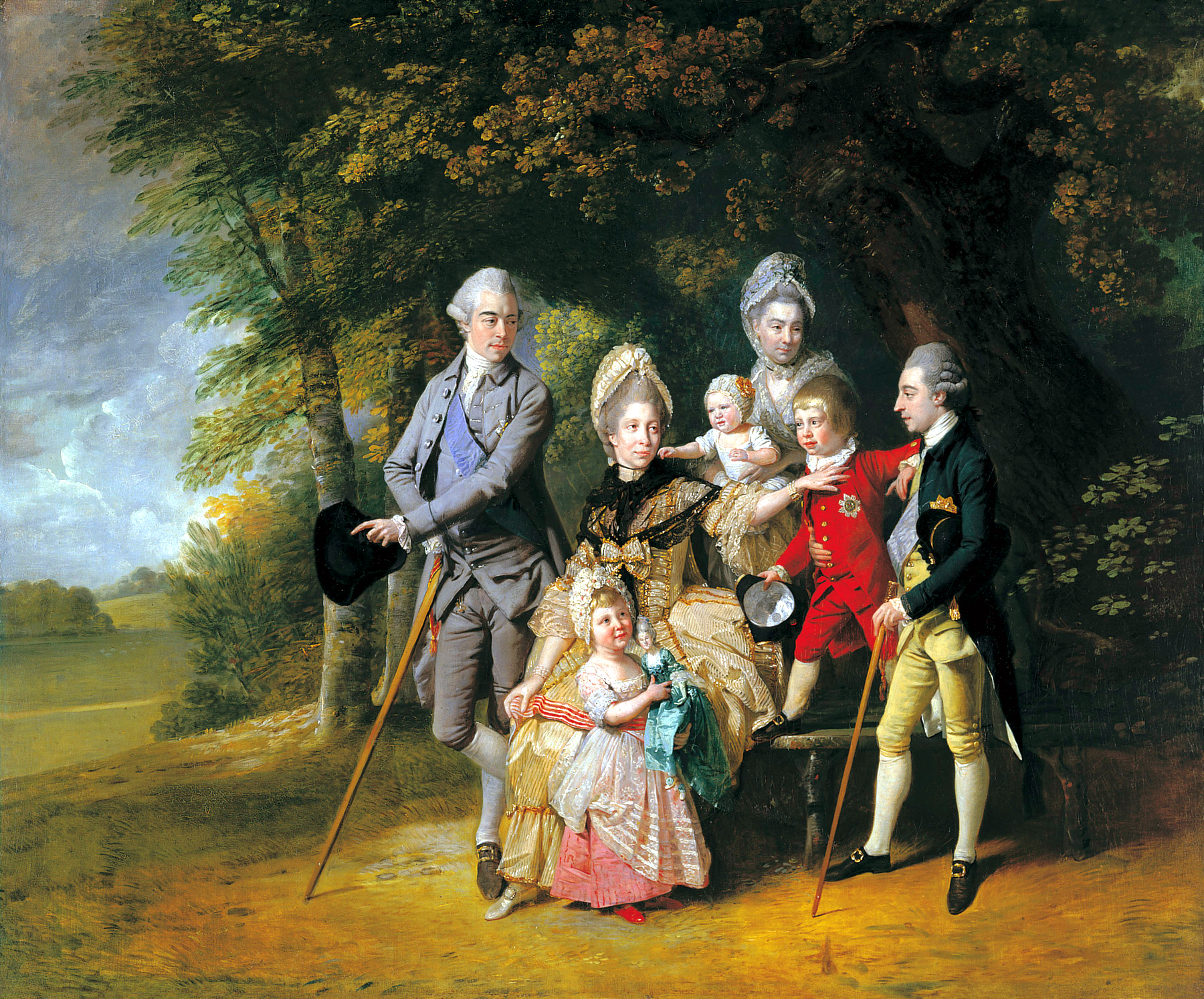
- Artist: Johan Zoffany
- Year: 1772
- Type: Oil on canvas
- Dimensions: 105.3 cm × 127 cm (41.5 in × 50 in)
- Location: Royal Collection

Queen Charlotte with Members of Her Family is a 1772 oil painting by the German-born British artist Johann Zoffany. A conversation piece it depicts Queen Charlotte with a selection of members of her family. The queen consort of George III, Charlotte had come to Britain from her native Mecklenburg-Strelitz. She is shown with two of her brothers then visiting England Ernest and Charles, as well as three of her young children Charlotte, Princess Royal and the future monarchs William IV and Ernest Augustus. They are accompanied by Lady Charlotte Finch the royal governess.

It was displayed at the Royal Academy Exhibition of 1773 held in Pall Mall. It remains in the Royal Collection today.

== Bibliography ==
- Roberts, Jane. George III and Queen Charlotte: Patronage, Collecting and Court Taste. Royal Collection, 2009.
- Treadwell, Penelope. Johan Zoffany: Artist and Adventurer. Paul Holberton, 2009.
