= George IV, Count of Erbach-Fürstenau =

German noble (1646–1678)

George IV, Count of Erbach-Fürstenau (12 May 1646 – 20 June 1678), was a member of the German House of Erbach who held the fiefs of Fürstenau, Michelstadt, Reichenberg, Bad König and Breuberg.

Born in Hanau, he was the eighth child and fifth (but third surviving) son of George Albert I, Count of Erbach-Schönberg and his third wife Elisabeth Dorothea, a daughter of George Frederick II, Count of Hohenlohe-Waldenburg in Schillingsfürst.

== Life ==
Because he and his brothers were still minors at the time of their father's death in 1647, the guardianship and rule over the Erbach domains were assigned to their eldest half-brother George Ernest, who ruled alone until his death in 1669, without issue. George IV and his surviving younger brothers George Louis I and George Albert II jointly held the Erbach lands until 1672, when formal division of their possessions was effected: George IV received the districts of Fürstenau, Michelstadt, Bad König and Breuberg.

George IV pursued a military career, and eventually he was appointed major-general in the Netherlands. He died in the Waal river near Tiel, aged 32, at the end of the Franco-Dutch War, and was buried in Michelstadt.

== Marriage and issue ==
In Arolsen on 22 August 1671 George IV married Louise Anna (18 April 1653 – 30 June 1714), heiress of Culemborg and daughter of Prince Georg Friedrich of Waldeck by his wife Elisabeth Charlotte of Nassau-Siegen. They had four children:

- Sophie Charlotte (23 September 1672 – April 1673)
- Amalie Mauritiana (1674 – 1675)
- William Frederick (March 1676 – 18 August 1676)
- Charlotte Wilhelmine Albertine (posthumously; 18 September 1678 – 20 March 1683)

Because he died without surviving male issue, his domains reverted to his brothers, who divided them between themselves.
