= Bassewitz family =

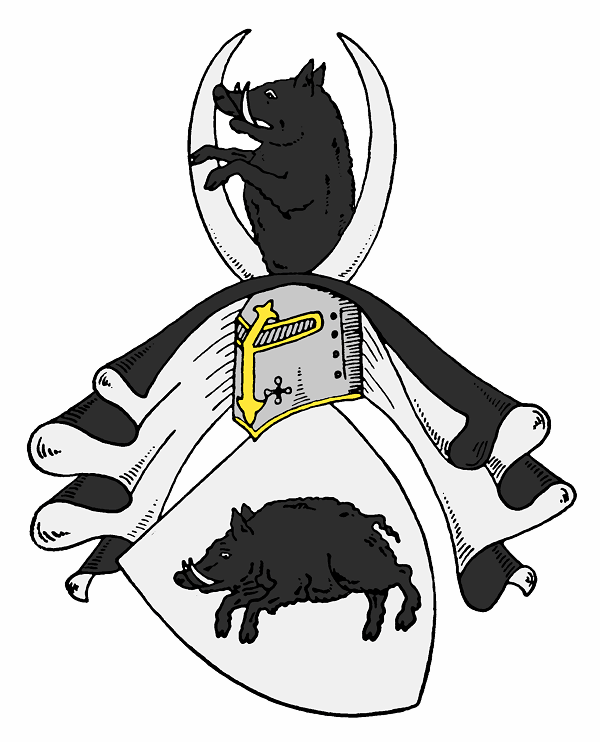
Coat of arms of the Bassewitz family

The Bassewitz family is a German noble family of ancient nobility, whose roots come from the Mecklenburg region. According to tradition, the family was named after the village of Basse (now a district of the municipality of Lühburg). In German hunter-language, Basse refers to a tusker or adult male wild boar. A Tusker Courant is the family's heraldic animal.

== History ==
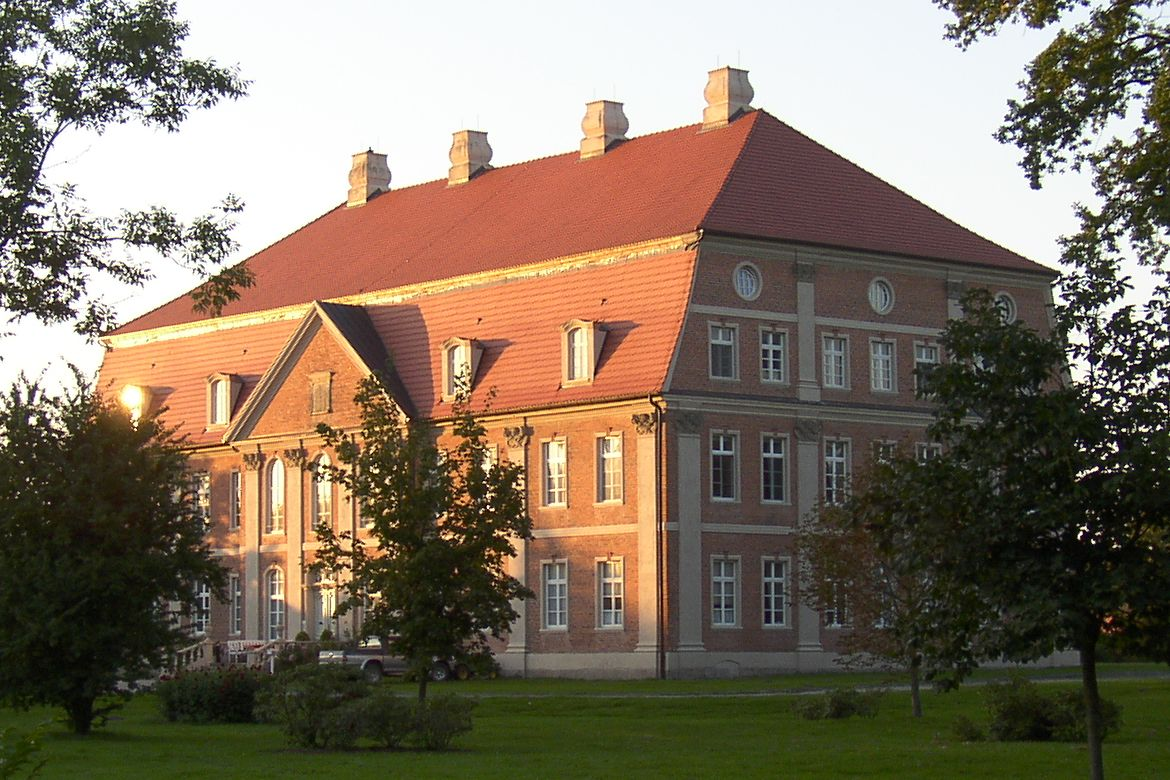
Prebberede palace

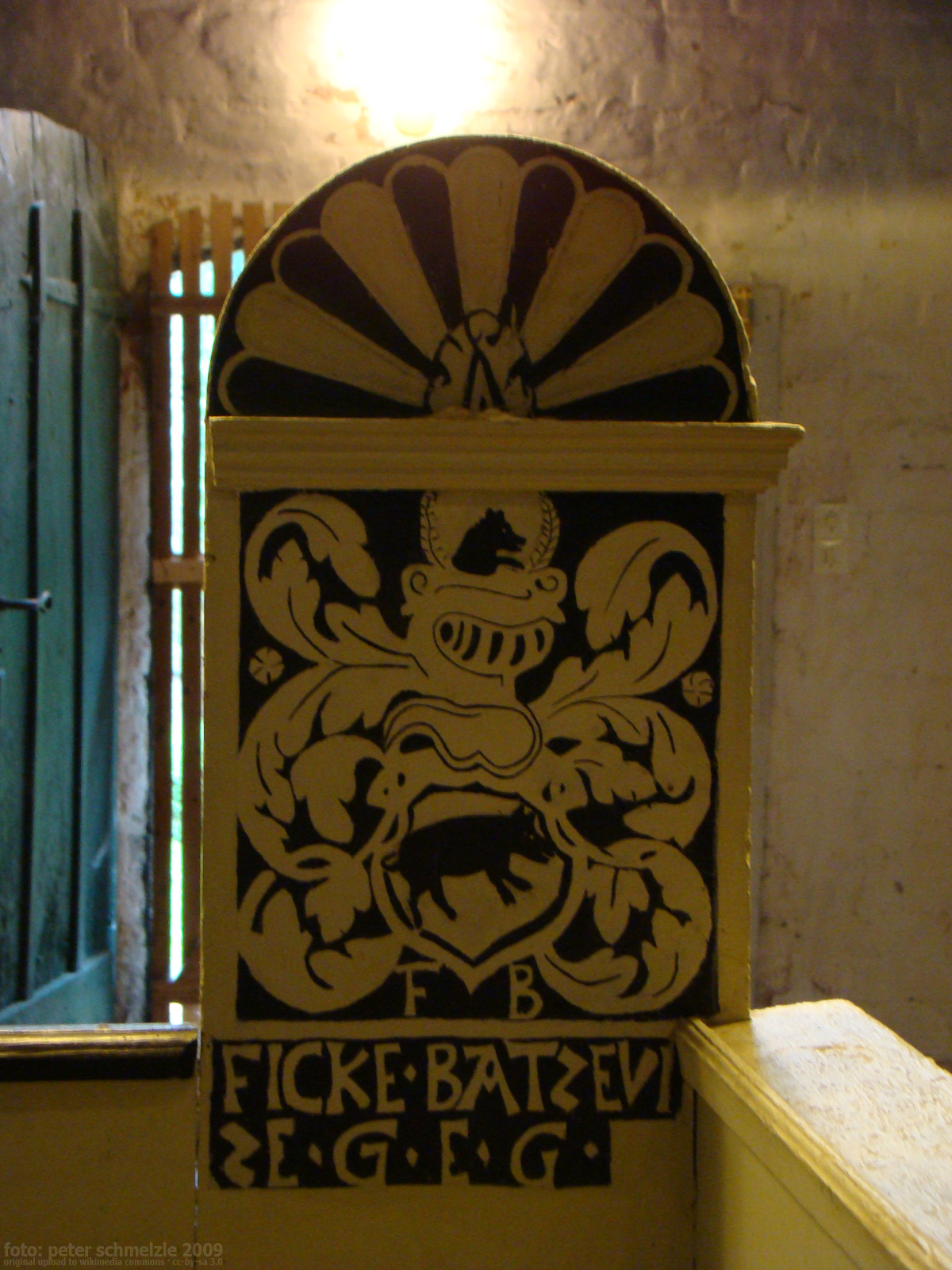
Coat of arms of Ficke Bassewitz in the Basse church (16th century)

Earliest references to the family include a document from 1254 in which Bernhardus de Bassewicze is mentioned. Another document from 1308 mentions Heinrich von Bassewitz.

It is unknown whether the family was among the German families immigrating the Mecklenburg region since the 12th century in the course of the German eastward expansion or whether the Bassewitz family was of Slavic origin. Slavic tribes (the Wends) settled in the area since the 7th century. At the time of colonization, German families took the name of the place where they settled as their surname, while at the same time, Wendish families began to adopt German names. In the early 14th century, the Bassewitz family was already documented as being in possession of several estates in Mecklenburg. It therefore seems more likely that the family is of Wendish origin.

Among the first estates owned by the family since the late Middle Ages and considered by it to be ancestral houses (Stammhaus) are Basse, Dalwitz, Hohen Luckow, Prebberede, Levetzow and Lühburg.

The family is split into two branches – the Mecklenburgian branch and the Wendish branch. It is believed that both branches divided in the 14th century and that their common progenitor is Hans von Bassewitz on Hohenluckow manor († 1397). The Mecklenburgian branch had estates in the territory of the Duchy of Mecklenburg while the Wendish branch owned estates in the former "Principality of Wenden". All current male members of the Wendish branch are descendants of Count Henning Friedrich von Bassewitz (1680–1749), who was awarded with a hereditary Holy Roman imperial countship (Reichsgraf) in 1726 by Emperor Karl VI for his diplomatic services. All legitimate male-line descendants of Count Henning Friedrich bear the name Graf von Bassewitz (Count von Bassewitz).

Four descendants of Count Henning Friedrich von Bassewitz held the highest office (prime minister) in Mecklenburg:

Count Carl Friedrich (1720–1783) — President of the Privy Council

Count Bernhard-Friedrich (1756–1816) – President of the Privy Council

Count Henning Karl Friedrich (1814–1885) – President of the Privy Council

Count Karl (1855–1921) – President of the State Ministry of Mecklenburg-Schwerin from 1901 through 1914.

== Elevations and Additions to the Coat of Arms ==
=== Counts von Bassewitz ===
Hereditary Holy Roman imperial countship granted to Henning Friedrich von Bassewitz in Vienna on 9 June 1726; incorporation into the Estonian Noble Corporation as of 29 January 1725.

=== Counts von Bassewitz-Levetzow ===
Bassewitz-Levetzow is a Prussian sub-branch of the comital branch originating from a unification of coat of arms and name with the Levetzow family and linked to the fideicommissum of Kläden manor; granted to Count Karl von Bassewitz in Baden-Baden on 2 October 1869; incorporation into Prussian nobility granted in Berlin on 7 November 1884 to his son and heir, Count Bernhard von Bassewitz. The last person to bear the name of a "Count von Bassewitz-Levetzow" was Count Georg Werner (1925–2016).

== Prominent members of the family ==
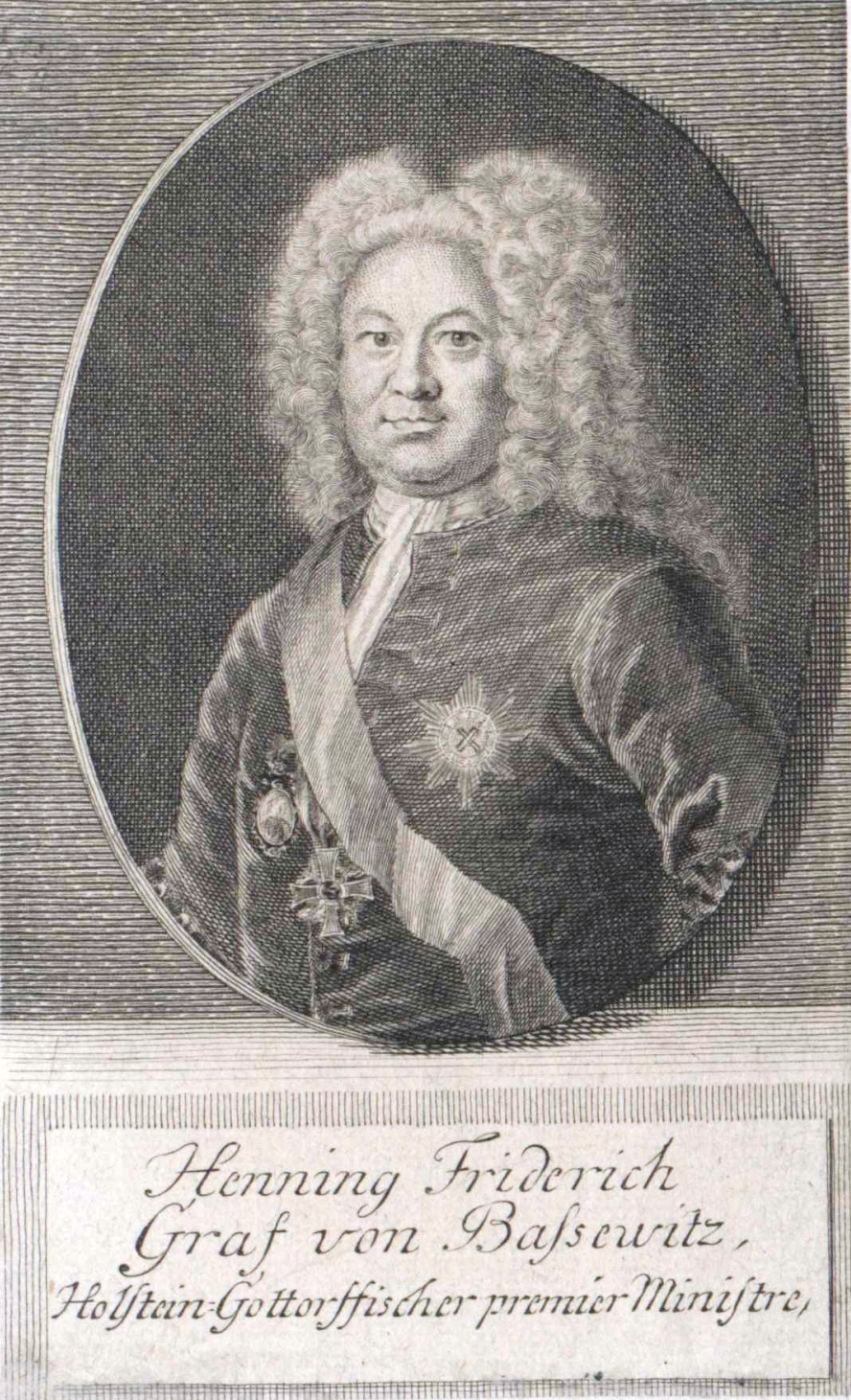
Portrait of Count Henning Friedrich von Bassewitz

- Joachim von Bassewitz (died 1610), steward to Ulrich, Duke of Mecklenburg
- Count Henning Friedrich von Bassewitz (1680–1749), on Prebberede manor etc., Imperial Privy Councillor of the Russian Empire and of the Holy Roman Empire, President of the Privy Council and Chief Court Marshall of the Duchy of Holstein-Gottorp, President of the Privy Council of the Duchy of Mecklenburg-Schwerin, recipient of the Order of St. Andrew
- Sabine Elisabeth Oelgard von Bassewitz (1716-1790), German writer
- Friedrich Magnus von Bassewitz (1773–1858), District President of Potsdam 1810 through 1848, Upper President of the Province of Brandenburg, Honorary citizen of Berlin and Potsdam
- Gerdt von Bassewitz (1878–1923), writer
- Countess Ina Marie von Bassewitz (1888–1973), spouse of Prince Oskar of Prussia
- Werner Graf von Bassewitz-Levetzow (1894–1964) was a German officer in World War II
