= Horst von Bassewitz =

German architect (1932–2020)

Horst von Bassewitz (9 January 1932 – 24 August 2020) was a German architect.

== Life ==
Horst von Bassewitz was born in Ludwigslust, the son of Barthold von Bassewitz (1902–1992) and Hedwig Schröder (1903–1966). From 1953 to 1959, von Bassewitz studied at the Technical University of Braunschweig and, after graduation as a Diplom-Ingenieur, became a staff member and later assistant at the chair of his professor Dieter Oesterlen. In 1961, he married Renate von Bonin (1935–2001).

From 1965 he worked at the architectural firm Schnittger in Kiel, and from 1967 to 1974 he partnered with Carl-Friedrich Fischer in Hamburg under the name “Fischer-Bassewitz”.

From 1974, von Bassewitz worked with the firm von Schramm, Pempelfort und Hupertz. The firm's name and composition changed several times; in 1989, Heiner Limbrock, who had joined in 1986, became a new partner. After Jost Schramm retired, the firm became a limited company under the name “BHL – von Bassewitz, Hupertz, Limbrock.” In 2003, Horst von Bassewitz and Stephan Hupertz retired from the firm, which now operates as “limbrock tubbesing.”

In 2006, Bassewitz founded the firm B&Z Architekten with Anna Katharina Zülch, focusing on the renovation of historic buildings and monument preservation.

Bassewitz was a member of the Free Academy of the Arts, Hamburg, of the construction committee of the North Elbian Evangelical Lutheran Church, the German National Committee for Monument Protection, the Association of German Architects (BDA), and the German Academy for Urban and Regional Planning. He also served as chair of the Scientific Commission of the German Foundation for Monument Protection.

Basswitz died in August 2020. In an obituary, dated October 2020, in the Hamburg regional issue of Deutsches Architektenblatt, the monthly publication of the Länderarchitektenkammern (architects regional chamber), fellow architect Professor Ullrich Schwarz described him as a "cultured, educated, cosmopolitan and indeed friendly person." He noted that the Hamburg Free Academy of Art's award to him in 2019 was the academy's highest honour.

== Works ==
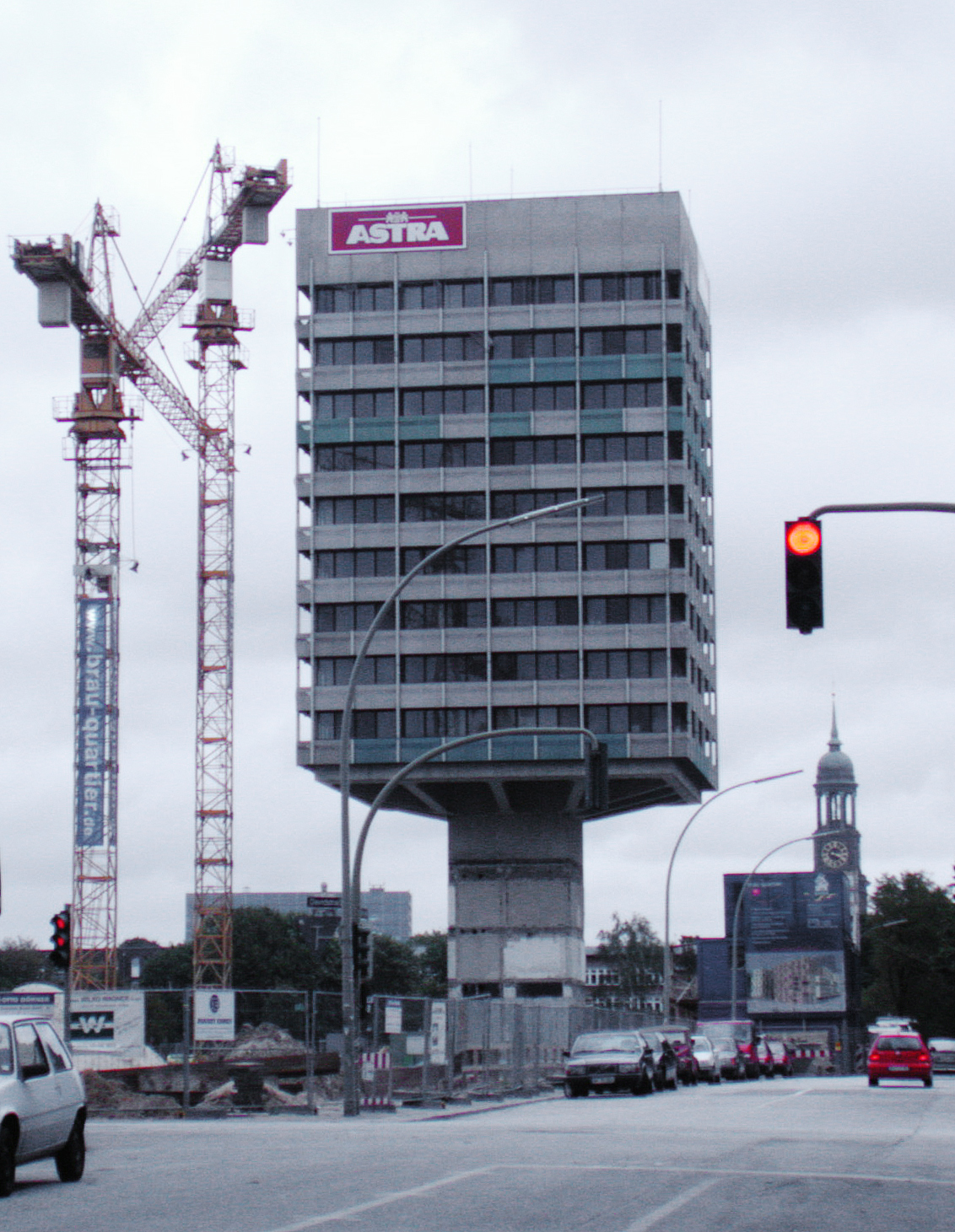
Astra Tower

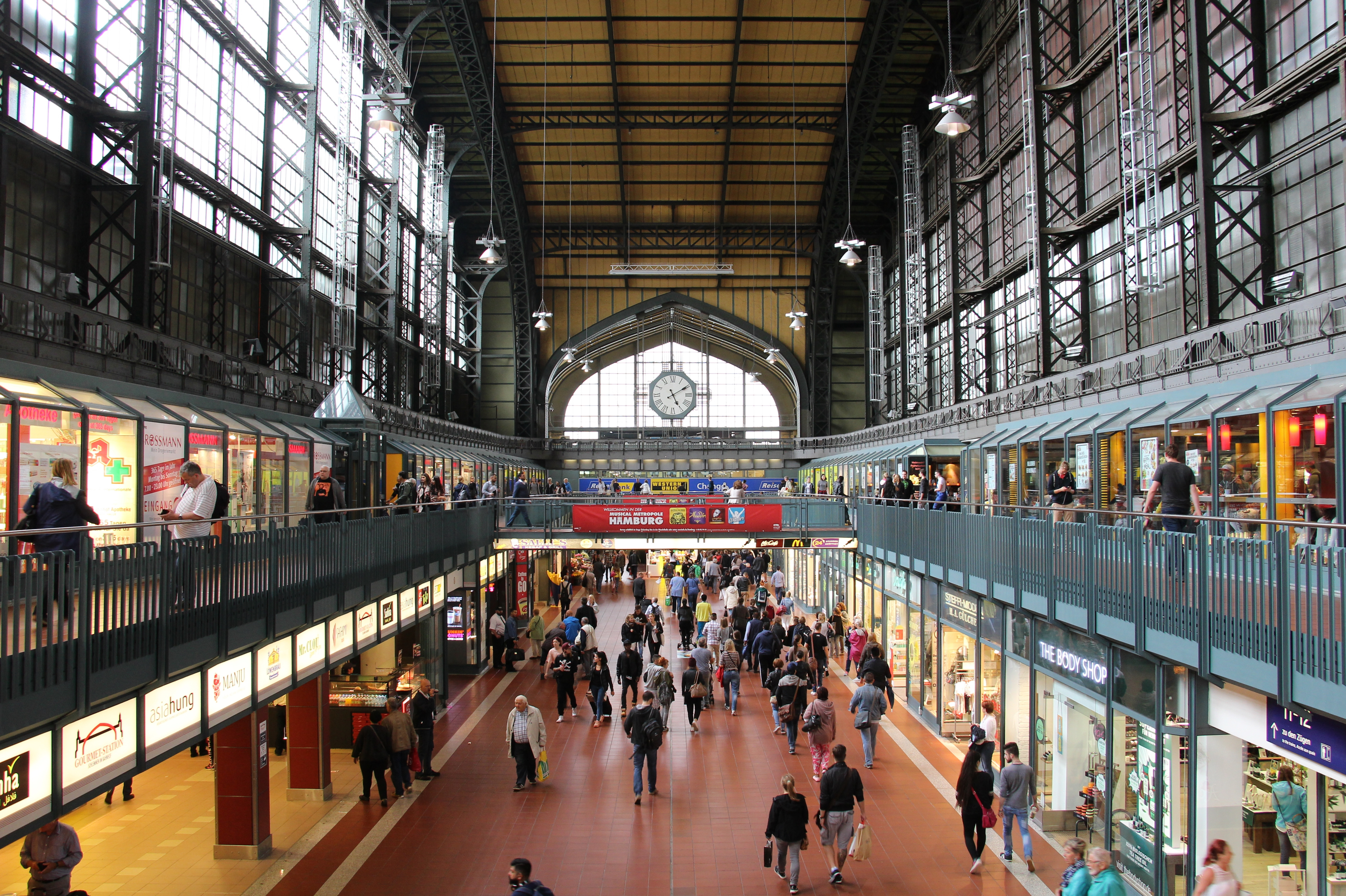
Wandelhalle in Hamburg Central Station

Numerous administrative, school, and residential buildings were constructed based on von Bassewitz's designs, mostly in Hamburg, many of them in collaboration with Carl-Friedrich Fischer (office “Fischer-Bassewitz”):

- 1970: Astra Tower for the Bavaria – St. Pauli Brewery (Astra beer) in Hamburg-St. Pauli; demolished in 2005 and replaced by a new building of the same name.
- 1971: Hotel Intercontinental in Hamburg, together with “Matthaei & Elscher” and “Hartwig & Ott”; demolished in 2014 (see The Fontenay).
- 1974: Hexenberg residential complex between Hamburg-Altona and St. Pauli, together with the firm of Werner Kallmorgen. Received the “Exemplary Buildings” award of the Hamburg building authority.
- 1978–1983: Hamburg-Hammerbrook station (architectural group Schramm, Pempelfort, von Bassewitz, and Hupertz).
- 1985–1991: Wandelhalle at Hamburg Central Station.

His later work was the field of historic preservation. Key projects include the Prince's Palace in Schleswig, Reinbek Castle, Ahrensburg Castle, and Schwerin Castle.

== Awards ==
- 1987: Heinrich Tessenow Medal of the Alfred Toepfer Foundation F. V. S., Hamburg.
- 2015: Silver Hemisphere of the German Prize for Monument Protection.
- 2019: Medal of the Free Academy of the Arts in Hamburg “in recognition of more than 50 years of outstanding achievements in the fields of architecture and monument preservation.”
