= Friderike Elisabeth von Grabow =

Friderike Elisabeth von Grabow (née von der Kettenburg; 1705 – 7 July 1779) was a German poet and private tutor.

== Life ==
She was the daughter of Hans Friedrich von der Kettenburg, ambassador to the court of the Holy Roman Emperor in Vienna, where she grew up. She married the court official Friedrich Wilhelm von Grabow in Güstrow (then in the Duchy of Mecklenburg-Strelitz) but was widowed soon afterwards. In 1746, she was summoned by Duchess Elisabeth Albertine to be tutor to her two surviving daughters Christiane and Charlotte; the latter later married George III of the United Kingdom.

In 1753 she was accepted as a member of the Deutsche Gesellschaft zu Greifswald (Royal German Society of Greifswald). Her works included Freye Betrachtungen über die Psalmen Davids in Versen. (Free Reflections on the Psalms of David in Verse), published in Lübeck and Leipzig in 1752 with a foreword by Sabine Elisabeth Oelgard von Bassewitz.

The British travel writer Thomas Nugent came to Gustrow in 1766 and was introduced to von Grabow by her cousin captain von Kettenburg. He described the meeting in Volume 2 of his 1768 book Travels through Germany:

I was very desirous to see this lady, of whom I had heard a great many fine things, particularly of her intellectual accomplishments. ... She has a very handsome house, which has cost her a great deal of money; and she is still employed in beautifying it to her mind. We were introduced into a very elegant room, extremely well furnished, where we had been but a few moments, when the lady appeared, and by her early address and polite reception, immediately shewed [sic] herself a person of superior accomplishments.

Madam de Grabow is turned of sixty, rather low in stature, round faced, black piercing eyes, and a little pitted with the smallpox. Notwithstanding her age, she is hearty and strong, and does not appear to be much above forty: her physiognomy is remarkably lively and sensible; her mien engaging, and in every respect her air bespeaks her the woman of quality. She is chearful [sic] and easy in her conversation, and has a great fluency of speech. Her maiden name is Kettemburg [sic], being the daughter of a nobleman of that name, who was president of a nobleman of that name, who was president of the high court of Gustrow, and minister from his serene highness the duke of Mecklenburg to the court of Vienna. He took his daughter with him to that capital, where she learnt the manners of the court, spent a great part of her youth, and acquired every elegant accomplishment. She speaks Italian and French with ease, is a critic in her own tongue, and has written some pieces in verse, by which she has gained the title of the Sappho of Germany. After her return from Vienna, she was married to M. de Grabow, a very rich man, and assessor of the high court of Gustrow, who died, and left her a handsome fortune. The court of Strelitz pitched upon her as the most proper person to be governornante to the young princesses; an employ in which she acquitted herself with honour. Her greatest pride is the having formed the mind of our gracious queen, whom she mentions always in terms of affection mixed with the profoundest respect. At length, finding herself advanced in years, she thought proper to retire to Gustrow, where she still lives in splendour, beloved and esteemed by all her acquaintance.

No sooner had this lady sat down, than sweetments and wines of various forts were brought us, particularly some of the best Tokay I ever tasted. After the usual ceremonies we fell into a very free chit-chat, as if we had known one another many years. I found that she liked to talk about the affairs of England, with which she is well acquainted. A great deal of the conversation turned upon the queen; and she seemed to regret very much that she had not been sent for to attend her majesty to Stade, instead of madam Cocceius. After coffee she was pleased to shew [sic] me her library, which is well furnished with books in various branches of literature, in the German, French, and Italian languages. She is very much concerned that she does not understand English; but having a high idea of our best writers, she reads them translated into the German tongue. Particularly she paid me a compliment of her great desire of reading my Vandalia in the original. However, old as she is, she said she would endeavour to learn English; and I thought it but due complaisance to offer her a copy, which she accepted. At length we took our leave of the good lady, who invited us to dine with her the day following....

[He accepted and she sent him a letter thanking him for the gift. At dinner the following day] before she sat down, [she] returned me many thanks for my present of Vandalia, and assured me she would endeavour to learn English, in order to be able to peruse it. She then desired me to accept of a piece of her composing, which was a most elegant map of the world; the names of places are in Latin, the lines inimitably well drawn, when she was only, as she assured me, sixteen years of age. Her name is at the bottom in her own hand-writing: Friderica Elisabeth von der Kettemburg, Strelitz, 23 Septemb. An. 1723; from whence you see I had reason to conclude that the lady is turned of sixty. I returned her my most humble thanks, as you may well imagine, for so agreeable a present, which I promised always to preserve as a token of the great honour done me by a lady of her rank and merit.

As soon as compliments were over, we sat down to dinner ... Madam de Grabow drinks very moderately but loves to see her guests merry. It is not the custom to drink healths at present, at polite tables; yet she would break through the rule, and drank several British and Mecklenburg toasts, which she knew to be agreeable to the company. [The conversation turned to serfdom, still partially in place in Mecklenburg, and eventually] the dispute was decided by madam de Grabow in favour of liberty, and the whole company acquiesced in her decision.

She died in Güstrow in 1779.
