= George Frederick, Count of Erbach-Breuberg =

German prince (1636–1653)

George Frederick, Count of Erbach-Breuberg (6 October 1636 – 23 April 1653), was a German prince member of the House of Erbach and ruler over Breuberg.

He was the eldest child of George Albert I, Count of Erbach-Schönberg and his third wife Elisabeth Dorothea, a daughter of George Frederick II, Count of Hohenlohe-Waldenburg in Schillingsfürst.

== Life ==
Because he and his brothers were still minors at the time of their father's death in 1647, the guardianship and rule over the Erbach domains were assigned to their eldest half-brother George Ernest, who in 1653 gave George Frederick the district of Breuberg when he attained his majority; however, he died shortly after, unmarried and childless, and Breuberg merged back to the rule of George Ernest.
