= George Ernest, Count of Erbach-Wildenstein =

German prince member (1629–1669)

George Ernest, Count of Erbach-Wildenstein (7 October 1629 – 25 August 1669), was a German prince member of the House of Erbach and ruler over Wildenstein, Kleinheubach und Breuberg.

He was the third child and second (but eldest surviving son) of George Albert I, Count of Erbach-Schönberg and his first wife Magdalena, a daughter of Johann VI, Count of Nassau-Dillenburg.

== Life ==
After the death of his father in 1648, he ruled jointly with his half-brothers their domains until 1653, when he ceded Breuberg to George Frederick, but his early death allowed him to reunite this district to his government. Because his other three half-brothers are still minors, George Ernest continue to be sole ruler until his death.

In Fürstenau on 22 November 1656 George Ernest married with her step-aunt Charlotte Christiana (6 November 1625 – 13 August 1677), a daughter of George Frederick II, Count of Hohenlohe-Waldenburg in Schillingsfürst and his wife Dorothea Sophie of Solms-Hohensolms. They had no children.

George Ernest died in Kleinheubach aged 39. Because he died without issue, his domains where inherited by his surviving half-brothers, who ruled jointly until 1672, when they divided their lands between them.
