= Sabine Elisabeth Oelgard von Bassewitz =

German writer

Countess Sabine Elisabeth Oelgard von Bassewitz (15 December 1716, Gut Dalwitz, Mecklenburg – 7 February 1790, Gut Dalwitz, Mecklenburg) was a German writer.

== Life ==
From the old Mecklenburgian family of Bassewitz, her parents were the privy councillor Joachim Otto von Bassewitz (1686–1733) and his wife, Catharina Ilsabe (1693–1717). On 15 July 1733, she married her cousin count Bernhard Matthias von Bassewitz (1706–1783), chamberlain in the grand-princely court of Holstein. The marriage proved childless. After her husband's death on 29 December 1783, she inherited his estate at Gut Dalwitz, where she spent her old age, met with the widowed Duchess Louise Friederike von Mecklenburg-Schwerin (1721–1791) and finally died in 1790.

Her contemporaries considered her a "woman of great and rare talents" and was mentioned in the works of the philosophers Christian Wolff and Gottfried Wilhelm Leibniz. In 1772, Bassewitz wrote the foreword to Freye Betrachtungen über die Psalmen David’s (Free Reflections on the Psalms of David) by Friderike Elisabeth von Grabow. She also wrote poems, including an ode marking her survival of breast cancer, which she is said to have achieved almost solely with the use of reticulum roots. She considered herself a good harpsichord player and wrote another ode dedicated to music. The anonymous 1768 pamphlet Das wirksamste Hülfsmittel für das entkräftete Mecklenburg: der gegenwärtigen ansehnlichen Convocations-Versammlung angerathen, von einem wohlgesinnten Patrioten (The most effective aid for exhausted Mecklenburg) is also attributed to von Bassewitz.

Von Bassewitz corresponded with several scholars, including Johann Joachim Spalding and Voltaire. She and Voltaire collaborated on a Histoire de Charles XII (History of Charles XII) and other works. Her letters were admired at the time for the "purity and elegance of their style, their sharpness, their acquaintance with our literature, and for the heart of this rare woman".

== Bibliography ==
- (in German) Bassewitz, Sabine Elisabeth Oelgard von. In: Elisabeth Friedrichs: Die deutschsprachigen Schriftstellerinnen des 18. und 19. Jahrhunderts. Ein Lexikon. Metzler, Stuttgart 1981, ISBN 3-476-00456-2 , (Repertorien zur deutschen Literaturgeschichte 9), S. 16.
- (in German) Friedrich Schlichtegroll: Nekrolog auf das Jahr 1790. Justus Perthes, Gotha 1791, S. 141–146.
