= Charles II of Mecklenburg-Strelitz =

Ruler of Mecklenburg-Strelitz from 1794 to 1816

Charles II
- Grand Duke of Mecklenburg-Strelitz
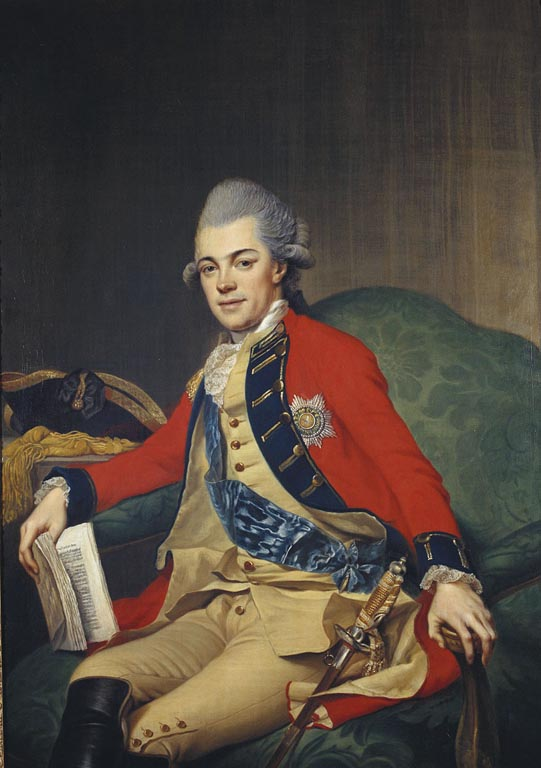
- Portrait by Johann Georg Ziesenis (1770)

Duke/Grand Duke of Mecklenburg-Strelitz
- Reign: 2 June 1794 – 6 November 1816
- Predecessor: Adolf Friedrich IV
- Successor: Georg
- Born: 10 October 1741; Mirow
- Died: 6 November 1816 (aged 75); Neustrelitz
- Spouses: Princess Friederike of Hesse-Darmstadt (m. 1768; died 1782); Princess Charlotte of Hesse-Darmstadt (m. 1784; died 1785)
- Issue: Charlotte Georgine, Duchess of Saxe-Hildburghausen; Duchess Caroline Auguste; Duke Georg Carl; Therese, Princess of Thurn and Taxis; Duke Friedrich Georg; Louise, Queen of Prussia; Frederica, Queen of Hanover; George, Grand Duke of Mecklenburg-Strelitz; Duke Friedrich Karl; Duchess Auguste Albertine; Duke Charles
Names
- Charles Louis Frederick
- House: Mecklenburg-Strelitz
- Father: Duke Charles Louis Frederick of Mecklenburg
- Mother: Princess Elisabeth Albertine of Saxe-Hildburghausen

Charles II (Charles Louis Frederick; 10 October 1741 – 6 November 1816) was ruler of the state of Mecklenburg-Strelitz from 1794 until his death. Originally ruling as duke, he was raised to the rank of grand duke in 1815. Prior to succeeding to the throne, he served as Governor of Hanover from 1776 to 1786.

== Early life and service in Hanover ==
Duke Charles Louis Frederick of Mecklenburg was born in Mirow on 10 October 1741, the second son of Duke Charles Louis Frederick of Mecklenburg and Princess Elisabeth Albertine of Saxe-Hildburghausen. On 11 December 1752, his uncle Adolphus Frederick III died and was succeeded by Charles's older brother, who became Adolphus Frederick IV. With his brother's accession, Charles was taken with the rest of the family from Mirow to the capital Strelitz.

From the age of 4, Charles looked set for a career in Hanoverian service after being given a Captain's commission. His sister Charlotte married the Elector of Hanover, King George III of the United Kingdom on 8 September 1761. Charles made frequent visits to his sister in Great Britain and he ultimately entered the service of his brother-in-law the Elector of Hanover with a chief military appointment at Hanover following service in Spain under Count Lippe.

In the autumn of 1776, Charles was appointed governor-general of Hanover by his brother-in-law. As Governor of Hanover, Charles effectively held all the powers of a sovereign ruler. His brother-in-law had no wish to reside in Germany, being thoroughly English. Shortly after being widowed for a second time in December 1785, Charles requested permission to retire from his military employments in Hanover and resign the governorship. His brother-in-law granted his request, promoted Charles to the rank of field marshal and granted him a pension. Charles then spent some time traveling before settling down in Darmstadt, where he became President of the Imperial Credit Commission.

Following the death of his childless older brother Adolf Friedrich IV on 2 June 1794, Charles succeeded him as the ruling Duke of Mecklenburg-Strelitz.

== Ruler of Mecklenburg-Strelitz ==
As ruler, Charles encouraged new agricultural trends, established a new police force, and implemented compulsory education. In 1806, his duchy joined the Confederation of the Rhine. Following the Congress of Vienna, he was elevated to the rank of grand duke on 28 June 1815.

In the summer of 1816, Charles went on a tour of Rebberg, Schwalbach and Hildburghausen. Shortly after returning, he was taken ill with inflammation of the lungs. He died in Neustrelitz on 6 November 1816 after suffering a fit of apoplexy. He was succeeded by his eldest son Georg.

== Marriages and children ==
After unsuccessful attempts to marry a Princess of Denmark and a Princess of Saxe-Gotha, Charles married as his first wife Princess Friederike of Hesse-Darmstadt, daughter of Prince George William of Hesse-Darmstadt, on 18 September 1768 in Darmstadt. They had ten children together, five of which survived to adulthood:

- Duchess Charlotte Georgine of Mecklenburg-Strelitz (1769–1818) married Frederick, Duke of Saxe-Altenburg
- Duchess Caroline Auguste of Mecklenburg (1771–1773), died in infancy
- Duke Georg Carl of Mecklenburg (1772–1773), died in infancy
- Duchess Therese of Mecklenburg (1773–1839) married Karl Alexander, 5th Prince of Thurn and Taxis
- Duke Friedrich Georg of Mecklenburg (1774–1774), died at the age of two months
- Duchess Louise of Mecklenburg (1776–1810) married Frederick William III of Prussia
- Duchess Frederica of Mecklenburg (1778–1841) married (1) Prince Louis Charles of Prussia (2) Prince Frederick William of Solms-Braunfels (3) Ernest Augustus, King of Hanover
- George, Grand Duke of Mecklenburg-Strelitz (1779–1860)
- Duke Friedrich Karl of Mecklenburg (1781–1783), died in infancy
- Duchess Auguste Albertine of Mecklenburg (1782–1782), lived one day

After Friederike's death in complications of the birth of their tenth child in 1782, Charles married her sister Princess Charlotte of Hesse-Darmstadt on 28 September 1784 in Darmstadt. Charlotte died on 12 December 1785 shortly after giving birth to a son

- Duke Charles of Mecklenburg (1785–1837), unmarried without issue.

== Ancestry ==
Ancestors of Charles II of Mecklenburg-Strelitz

8. Adolf Frederick I, Duke of Mecklenburg-Schwerin
4. Adolf Frederick II, Duke of Mecklenburg-Strelitz
9. Duchess Marie Katharina of Brunswick-Dannenberg
2. Duke Charles Louis Frederick of Mecklenburg
10. Christian William I, Prince of Schwarzburg-Sondershausen
5. Princess Christiane Emilie of Schwarzburg-Sondershausen
11. Countess Antonie Sibylle of Barby-Mühlingen
1. Charles II, Grand Duke of Mecklenburg-Strelitz
12. Ernest, Duke of Saxe-Hildburghausen
6. Ernest Frederick I, Duke of Saxe-Hildburghausen
13. Countess Sophie of Waldeck
3. Princess Elisabeth Albertine of Saxe-Hildburghausen
14. George Louis I, Count of Erbach-Erbach
7. Countess Sophia Albertine of Erbach-Erbach
15. Countess Amalia Katharina of Waldeck-Eisenberg

Charles II of Mecklenburg-Strelitz House of Mecklenburg-Strelitz Cadet branch of the House of Mecklenburg Born: 10 October 1741 Died: 6 November 1816
Regnal titles
Preceded by Adolf Friedrich IV	Duke of Mecklenburg-Strelitz; 1794–1815	Raised to Grand Duke
New title	Grand Duke of Mecklenburg-Strelitz; 1815–1816	Succeeded by Georg
