= Philipp Louis, Count of Erbach-Erbach =

German prince

Philipp Louis, Count of Erbach-Erbach (10 June 1669 – 17 June 1720), was a German prince member of the House of Erbach and ruler over Erbach, Freienstein, Wildenstein, Michelstadt and Breuberg.

Born in Erbach, he was the third child and eldest son of George Louis I, Count of Erbach-Erbach and his wife Countess Amalia Katharina of Waldeck-Eisenberg, a daughter of Philipp Dietrich, Count of Waldeck-Eisenberg.

== Life ==
He pursued a military and eventually was appointed a Lieutenant-general by the States General of the Netherlands. In 1693, after the death of his father, Philipp Louis inherited all his domains jointly with his two surviving brothers, but in fact he managed to kept the full authority.

In Erbach on 16 January 1706 married to his first cousin once removed Albertine Elisabeth (9 February 1664 – 1 November 1727), a daughter of Prince Georg Friedrich of Waldeck and his wife Elisabeth Charlotte of Nassau-Siegen. They had no children.

Philipp Louis died in Coburg aged 51. Because he died without issue, all the paternal domains where inherited by his only surviving brother Frederick Charles.
