= Frederick Charles, Count of Erbach-Limpurg =

German aristocrat

Frederick Charles, Count of Erbach-Limpurg (21 May 1680 – 20 February 1731), was a German prince member of the House of Erbach and ruler (through marriage) over the Lordship of Limpurg-Michelbach and (through inheritance) over Erbach, Freienstein, Wildenstein, Michelstadt and Breuberg.

== Biography ==
Born in Erbach, he was the fourteenth child and sixth (but third surviving) son of George Louis I, Count of Erbach-Erbach and his wife Countess Amalia Katharina of Waldeck-Eisenberg, a daughter of Philipp Dietrich, Count of Waldeck-Eisenberg.

After the death of his father in 1693, Frederick Charles and his surviving older brothers inherited all the Erbach-Erbach domains; however, as the last surviving son of sixteen children, he was still a minor and the government of the lands and legal guardianship were held by the oldest brother Philipp Louis, who managed to rule alone even after his brothers attained majority.

On 18 May 1711 Frederick Charles married Sophie Eleonore (10 June 1695 – 28 January 1738), youngest daughter of Vollrath, Schenk of Limpurg-Speckfeld in Obersontheim. They had four children:

- Ernest Louis Vollrath William (5 March 1712 – 3 March 1713).
- Sophie Christine Albertine (5 November 1716 – 15 December 1741), married on 5 November 1738 to her first-cousin Count Frederick Louis of Löwenstein-Wertheim-Virneburg.
- Fredericka Charlotte Wilhelmine (6 January 1722 – 29 December 1786), married on 7 December 1738 to her first-cousin Count Johann Louis Vollrath of Löwenstein-Wertheim-Virneburg.
- Wilhelmine Amalie (7 August 1724 – 3 January 1725).

As Sophie Eleonore was one of the five surviving daughters and co-heiresses of Vollrath of Limpurg, when her father, died in 1713 Frederick Charles received the Lordship of Michelbach as part of the inheritance, and the rights to assume the arms and titles of Limpurg (mitregierender Count of Limpurg-Obersontheim).

In 1720 after the death of his brother Philipp Louis without issue, Frederick Charles finally inherited the Erbach-Erbach inheritance as sole ruler.

Frederick Charles died in Erbach aged 50 and was buried in Michelstadt. He died without a surviving male issue and the Erbach-Erbach domains were inherited by the branch of Erbach-Schönberg, but the Limpurg inheritance was divided between his daughters, who passed it on to their descendants.
