= Grand Duke George of Russia =

There have been several dynasts of Russian Imperial House whose name is George:

- Grand Duke George Mikhailovich of Russia (1863-1919), grandson of Nicholas I and son of Grand Duke Michael Nikolaevich of Russia.
- Grand Duke George Alexandrovich of Russia, younger brother of Nicholas II
- Grand Duke George Mikhailovich of Russia, son of Grand Duchess Maria Vladimirovna of Russia.
