= Boddin =

- Ortsteil of Walkendorf
- Interactive map of Boddin
- Location within Germany Location within Mecklenburg-Vorpommern
- Coordinates: 53°55′N 12°39′E
- Country: Germany
- State: Mecklenburg-Vorpommern
- District: Rostock
- Municipality: Walkendorf

Area
  - Total: 23.61 km^{2} (9.12 sq mi)
- Elevation: 32 m (105 ft)

Population (2017-12-31)
  - Total: 314
  - Density: 13.3/km^{2} (34.4/sq mi)
- Time zone: UTC+01:00 (CET)
  - Summer (DST): UTC+02:00 (CEST)
- Postal codes: 17179
- Dialling codes: 039971
- Vehicle registration: LRO
- Website: www.amt-gnoien.de

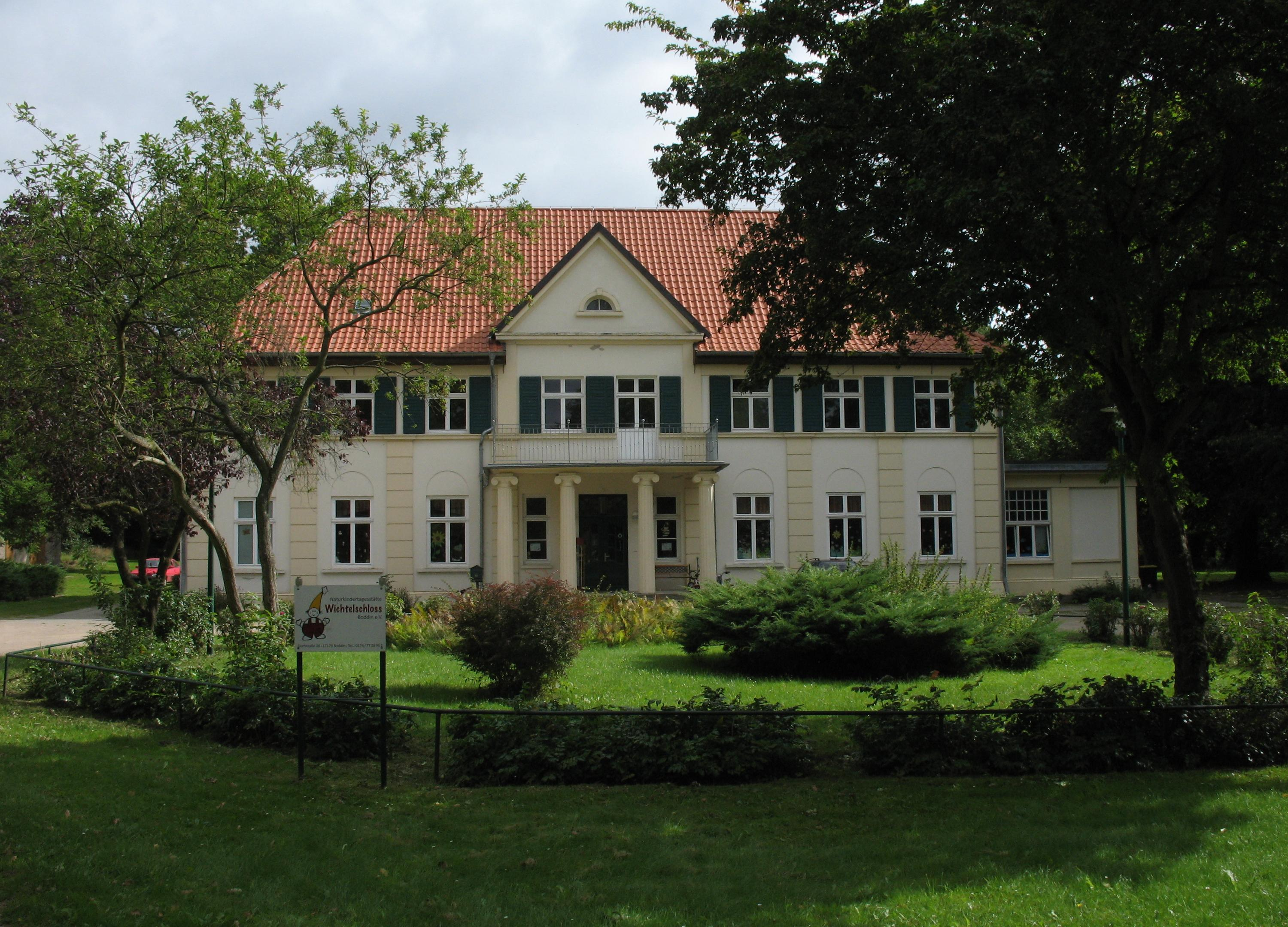
Manor house

Boddin is a village and a former municipality in the Rostock district, in Mecklenburg-Vorpommern, Germany. Since May 2019, it is part of the municipality Walkendorf.

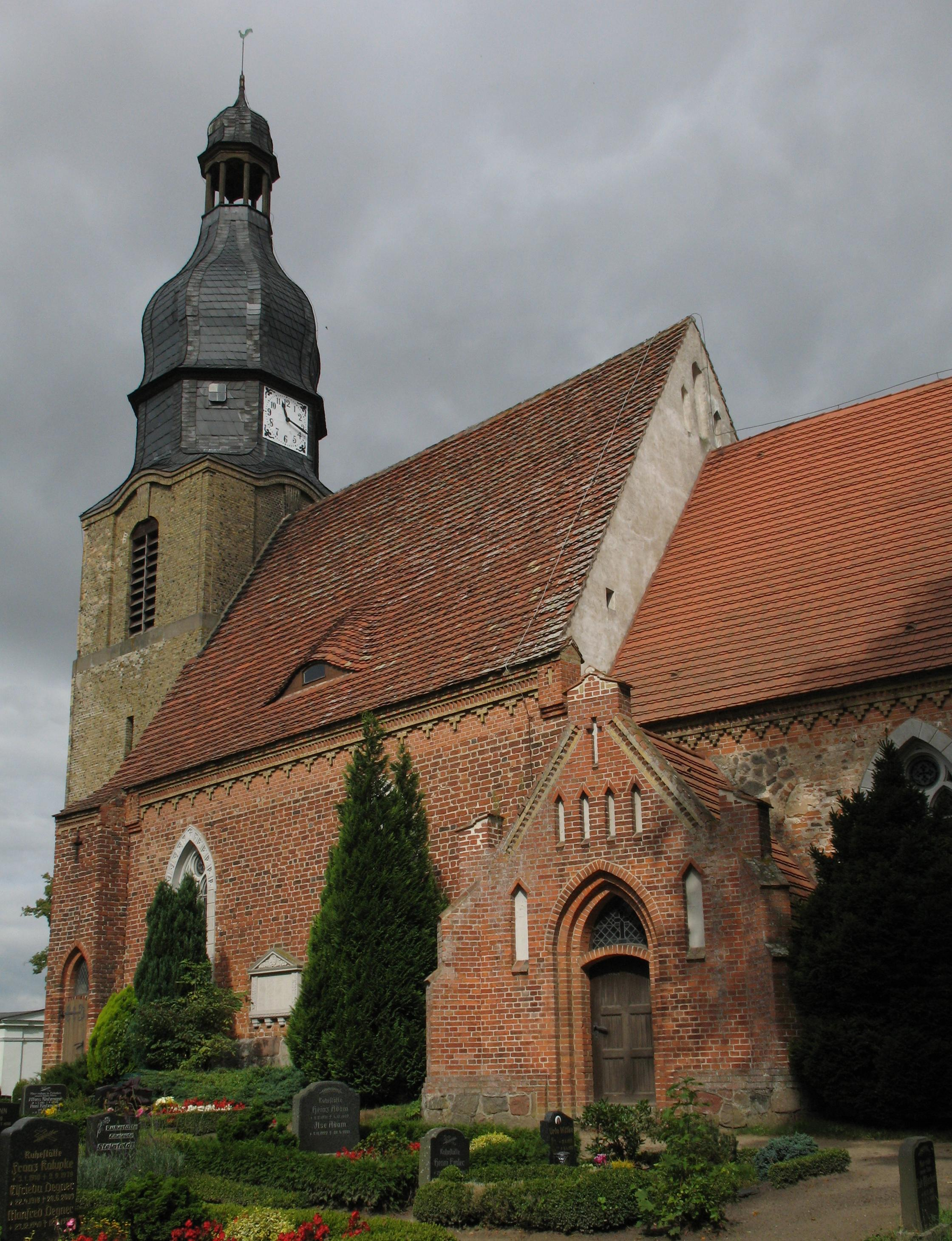
Church

In 1230, this village was recorded with the name of Bodin.
