= Astra Tower =

Astra Tower may refer to:

- Astra Tower, a 63-story skyscraper located in Jakarta, Indonesia
- Astra Tower, a 40-story skyscraper located in Salt Lake City, Utah, United States
