= Walkendorf =

- Municipality
- Location of Walkendorf within Rostock district
- Interactive map of Walkendorf
- Location within Germany Location within Mecklenburg-Vorpommern
- Coordinates: 53°58′N 12°33′E
- Country: Germany
- State: Mecklenburg-Vorpommern
- District: Rostock
- Municipal assoc.: Gnoien

Government
  - Mayor: Henrik Jager

Area
  - Total: 68.62 km^{2} (26.49 sq mi)
- Elevation: 24 m (79 ft)

Population (2025-12-31)
  - Total: 915
  - Density: 13.3/km^{2} (34.5/sq mi)
- Time zone: UTC+01:00 (CET)
  - Summer (DST): UTC+02:00 (CEST)
- Postal codes: 17179
- Dialling codes: 039971
- Vehicle registration: LRO
- Website: www.gemeinde-walkendorf.de

Walkendorf is a municipality in the Rostock district, in Mecklenburg-Vorpommern, Germany. The former municipalities Boddin and Lühburg were merged into Walkendorf in May 2019.
