= Julius Ernst, Duke of Brunswick-Dannenberg =

German duke (1571–1636)

Julius Ernest, Duke of Brunswick and Lunenburg (1571–1636), Prince of Dannenberg, was a son of Henry III, Duke of Brunswick-Lüneburg and Ursula of Saxe-Lauenburg. On his father's death in 1598 he inherited the Principality of Dannenberg. He died without male issue, and so the Dannenberg principality and his share of Hitzacker was inherited by his brother Augustus.

== Marriage and issue ==
He married twice, first to Maria of Ostfriesland (1 January 1582 – 9 July 1616), daughter of Edzard II. They had two children:

- Sigismund Heinrich (30 August 1614 – 1 November 1614)
- Maria Katharina (9 July 1616 – 1 July 1665); married Adolf Frederick I, Duke of Mecklenburg-Schwerin (1588–1658).

On his first wife's death in 1616, he remarried to Sybille of Braunschweig-Lüneburg (3 June 1584 – 5 August 1652), daughter of Wilhelm von Braunschweig-Lüneburg. They had two children:

- August (b. 1619)
- Anna Maria (b. 1622)
