= George Albert I of Erbach-Schönberg =

German prince (1597–1647)

George Albert I, Count of Erbach-Schönberg (16 December 1597 – 25 November 1647), was a German prince member of the House of Erbach and ruler over Schönberg, Seeheim, Reichenberg, Fürstenau and since 1643 over all the Erbach family lands.

== Early life and ancestry ==
Born in Erbach, he was the fourth child and second (but eldest surviving) son of George III, Count of Erbach-Breuberg by his fourth wife, Countess Maria of Barby-Mühlingen (1563-1619), a daughter of Count Albert X of Barby-Mühlingen (1534-1588).

== Biography ==
After the death of their father, George Albert I and his surviving elder half-brothers divided the Erbach domains in 1606: he received the districts of Schönberg and Seeheim.

In 1617 he was captured by pirates and taken to Tunis, but shortly after he was ransomed.

In 1623, after the death of his eldest half-brother Frederick Magnus without surviving issue, the remaining brothers divided his domains: George Albert I received the district of Reichenberg.

In 1627, with the death of another half-brother, John Casimir, unmarried and without issue, was made another land division; this time George Albert I received Fürstenau. Finally, the death of his last surviving half-brother Louis I in 1643 without living sons, allowed George Albert I to reunite all the Erbach family possessions.

George Albert I died in Erbach aged 49 and was buried in Michelstadt.

== Marriages and Issue ==
In Erbach on 29 May 1624 George Albert I married firstly with Countess Magdalena of Nassau-Dillenburg (13 November 1595 – 31 July 1633), a daughter of Johann VI, Count of Nassau-Dillenburg by his third wife, Countess Johannetta of Sayn-Wittgenstein. They had six children:

- Ernest Louis Albert (6 October 1626 – 10 May 1627).
- Louise Albertine (5 October 1628 – 20 October 1645).
- George Ernest, Count of Erbach-Wildenstein (7 October 1629 – 25 August 1669).
- Maria Charlotte (24 March 1631 – 8 June 1693), married on 15 June 1650 to Count Johann Ernest of Isenburg-Büdingen-Wächtersbach.
- Anna Philippina (15 July 1632 – 16 March 1633).
- Stillborn son (31 July 1633).

On 23 February 1634 George Albert I married secondly with Countess Anna Dorothea of Limpurg-Gaildorf (1612 – 23 June 1634), a daughter of Albert, Schenk of Limpurg-Gaildorf (1658-1619) and his wife, Emilie of Rogendorf (b. 1650). They had no children.

In Frankfurt am Main on 26 July 1635 George Albert I married thirdly with Countess Elisabeth Dorothea of Hohenlohe-Waldenburg-Schillingsfürst (27 August 1617 – 12 November 1655), a daughter of George Frederick II, Count of Hohenlohe-Waldenburg-Schillingsfürst (1595-1625) and his wife, Countess Dorothea Sophie of Solms-Hohensolms (1595-1660). They had nine children:

- George Frederick, Count of Erbach-Breuberg (6 October 1636 – 23 April 1653).
- William Louis (born and died 7 December 1637).
- Sophie Elisabeth (13 May 1640 – 18 June 1641).
- Juliana Christina Elisabeth (10 September 1641 – 26 November 1692), married on 12 December 1660 to Count Salentin Ernest of Manderscheid-Blankenheim.
- George Louis I, Count of Erbach-Erbach (8 May 1643 – 30 April 1693).
- George Albert (14 May 1644 – 27 March 1645).
- Mauritia Susanna (30 March 1645 – 17 November 1645).
- George IV, Count of Erbach-Fürstenau (12 May 1646 – 20 June 1678).
- George Albert II, Count of Erbach-Fürstenau (posthumously 26 February 1648 – 23 March 1717).
