= Countess Amalia Katharina of Waldeck =

German noblewoman, poet and composer

Amalia Katharina of Waldeck-Eisenberg
- Countess of Erbach-Erbach
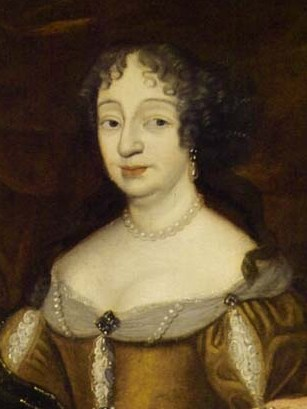
- Born: 8 August 1640; Erbach
- Died: 4 January 1697 (aged 56); Eisfeld
- Buried: Michelstadt, Starkenburg, Hesse-Darmstadt.
- Noble family: Waldeck-Eisenberg (by birth); House of Erbach (by marriage)
- Spouse: George Louis I, Count of Erbach-Erbach
- Issue: Henriette; Henriette Juliane; Philipp Louis, Count of Erbach-Erbach; Charles Albert of Erbach-Erbach; George Albert; Amalie Katharina; Frederick Charles; Wilhelmine Sophie; Magdalena Charlotte; Wilhelm Louis; Amalie Katharina; Fredericka Charlotte; Frederick Charles, Count of Erbach-Limpurg; Ernest; Sophia Albertine
- Father: Philip Dietrich, Count of Waldeck
- Mother: Maria Magdalena of Nassau-Siegen

Countess Amalia Katharina of Waldeck (8 August 1640 – 4 January 1697), née Countess of Erbach-Erbach, was a German noblewoman, poet and composer.

== Early life ==
She was born in Arolsen to Count Philipp Theodor von Waldeck-Eisenberg and his wife, Countess Marie Magdalene of Nassau-Siegen (1622–1647, daughter of William, Count of Nassau-Siegen). In 1664, she married George Louis I, Count of Erbach-Erbach, the son of George Albert I, Count of Erbach-Schönberg.

== Poet and composer ==
She published a number of Pietist poems and songs in Hildburghausen in 1692. They were meant for private household devotion. There were 67 poems, some of which had simple melodies and a figured bass.

== Issue ==
She and her husband had sixteen children:

- Henriette (27 September 1665 – 28 September 1665).
- Henriette Juliane (15 October 1666 – 27 February 1684).
- Philipp Louis, Count of Erbach-Erbach (10 June 1669 – 17 June 1720).
- Charles Albert Louis (16 June 1670 – k.a. Dapfing a.d.Donau, 18 August 1704).
- George Albert (born and died 1 July 1671).
- Amalia Katharina (13 May 1672 – 18 June 1676).
- Frederick Charles (19 April 1673 – 25 April 1673).
- A son (born and died 16 September 1674).
- Wilhelmine Sophie (16 February 1675 – 20 August 1678).
- Magdalena Charlotte (6 February 1676 – 3 December 1686).
- Wilhelm Louis (21 March 1677 – 19 February 1678).
- Amalie Katharina (born and died 18 February 1678).
- Fredericka Charlotte (19 April 1679 – 21 April 1689).
- Frederick Charles, Count of Erbach-Limpurg (21 May 1680 – 20 February 1731).
- Ernest (23 September 1681 – 2 March 1694).
- Sophia Albertine (30 July 1683 – 4 September 1742), married on 4 February 1704 to Ernest Frederick I, Duke of Saxe-Hildburghausen.
