= George Louis I of Erbach-Erbach =

German prince (1643–1693)

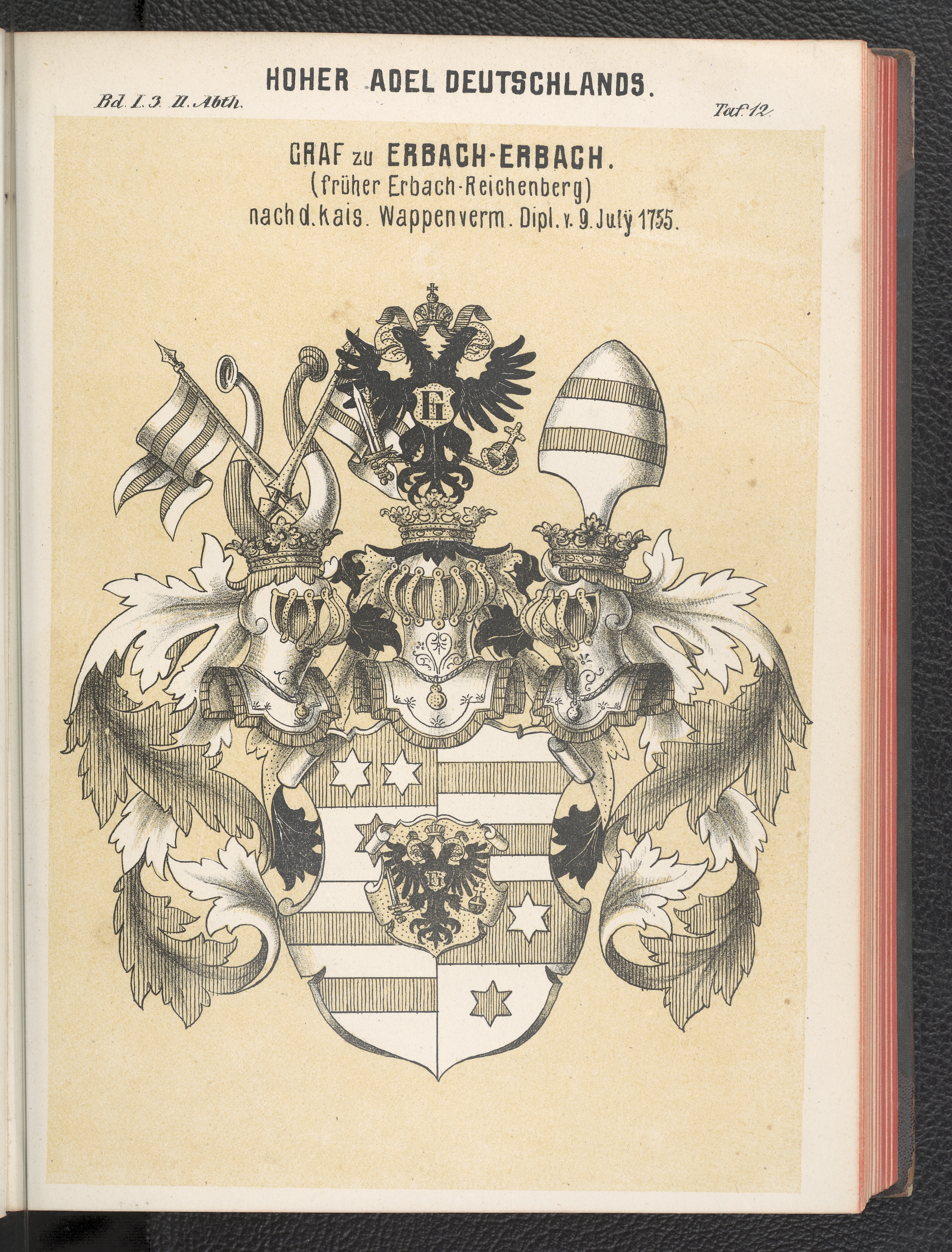
Coat of arms of the Counts of Erbach-Erbach

George Louis I, Count of Erbach-Erbach (8 May 1643 – 30 April 1693), was a German count, member of the House of Erbach and ruler over Erbach, Freienstein, Wildenstein, Michelstadt and Breuberg.

== Early life ==
Born in Fürstenau, he was the fifth child and third (but second surviving) son of George Albert I, Count of Erbach-Schönberg by his third wife, Countess Elisabeth Dorothea of Hohenlohe-Waldenburg-Schillingsfürst (1617-1665), a daughter of George Frederick II, Count of Hohenlohe-Waldenburg-Schillingsfürst (1595-1635).

== Erbach domains ==
Because he and his brothers were still minors at the time of their father's death in 1647, the guardianship and rule over the Erbach domains were assigned to their eldest half-brother George Ernest, who ruled alone until his death in 1669, without issue. George Louis I and his surviving younger brothers George IV and George Albert II ruled jointly the Erbach lands until 1672, when was made the formal division of their possessions: George Louis I received the districts of Erbach, Freienstein and Wildenstein. The death of George IV in 1678 without surviving issue forced another division in the Erbach patrimony; this time George Louis received the districts of Michelstadt and Breuberg.

== Marriage and issue ==
In Culemborg on 26 December 1664 George Louis I married with Countess Amalia Katharina of Waldeck-Eisenberg (13 August 1640 – 4 January 1697), a daughter of Philipp Dietrich, Count of Waldeck-Eisenberg (1614-1645), who inherited the County of Culemborg, and Countess Maria Magdalena von Nassau-Siegen (1622-1647). They had sixteen children:

- Henriette (27 September 1665 – 28 September 1665).
- Henriette Juliane (15 October 1666 – 27 February 1689), died unmarried and without issue.
- Philipp Louis, Count of Erbach-Erbach (10 June 1669 – 17 June 1720), married his cousin, Countess Albertine Elisabeth von Waldeck-Eisenberg (1664-1727). The marriage remained childless
- Charles Albert Louis (16 June 1670 – k.a. Dapfing a.d.Donau, 18 August 1704).
- George Albert (born and died 1 July 1671).
- Amalie Katharina (13 May 1672 – 18 June 1676).
- Frederick Charles (19 April 1673 – 20 April 1673).
- A son (born and died 16 September 1674).
- Wilhelmine Sophie (16 February 1675 – 20 August 1675).
- Magdalena Charlotte (6 February 1676 – 3 December 1676).
- Wilhelm Louis (21 March 1677 – 19 February 1678).
- Amalie Katharina (born and died 18 February 1678).
- Ludwig
- Fredericka Charlotte (19 April 1679 – 21 April 1679).
- Frederick Charles, Count of Erbach-Limpurg (21 May 1680 – 20 February 1731), married Countess Sophie Eleonore von Limpurg-Speckfeld (1695-1738) and had issue
- Ernest (23 September 1681 – 2 March 1684).
- Sophia Albertine (30 July 1683 – 4 September 1742), married on 4 February 1704 to Ernest Frederick I, Duke of Saxe-Hildburghausen.

== Death ==
George Louis I, Count of Erbach-Erbach died on 30 April 1693 in Arolsen, Waldeck, aged 49. His body was interred in Michelstadt, Odenwald, Hesse.
