= Duchess Catherine of Oldenburg =

Descendant of Paul I

Catherine of Oldenburg
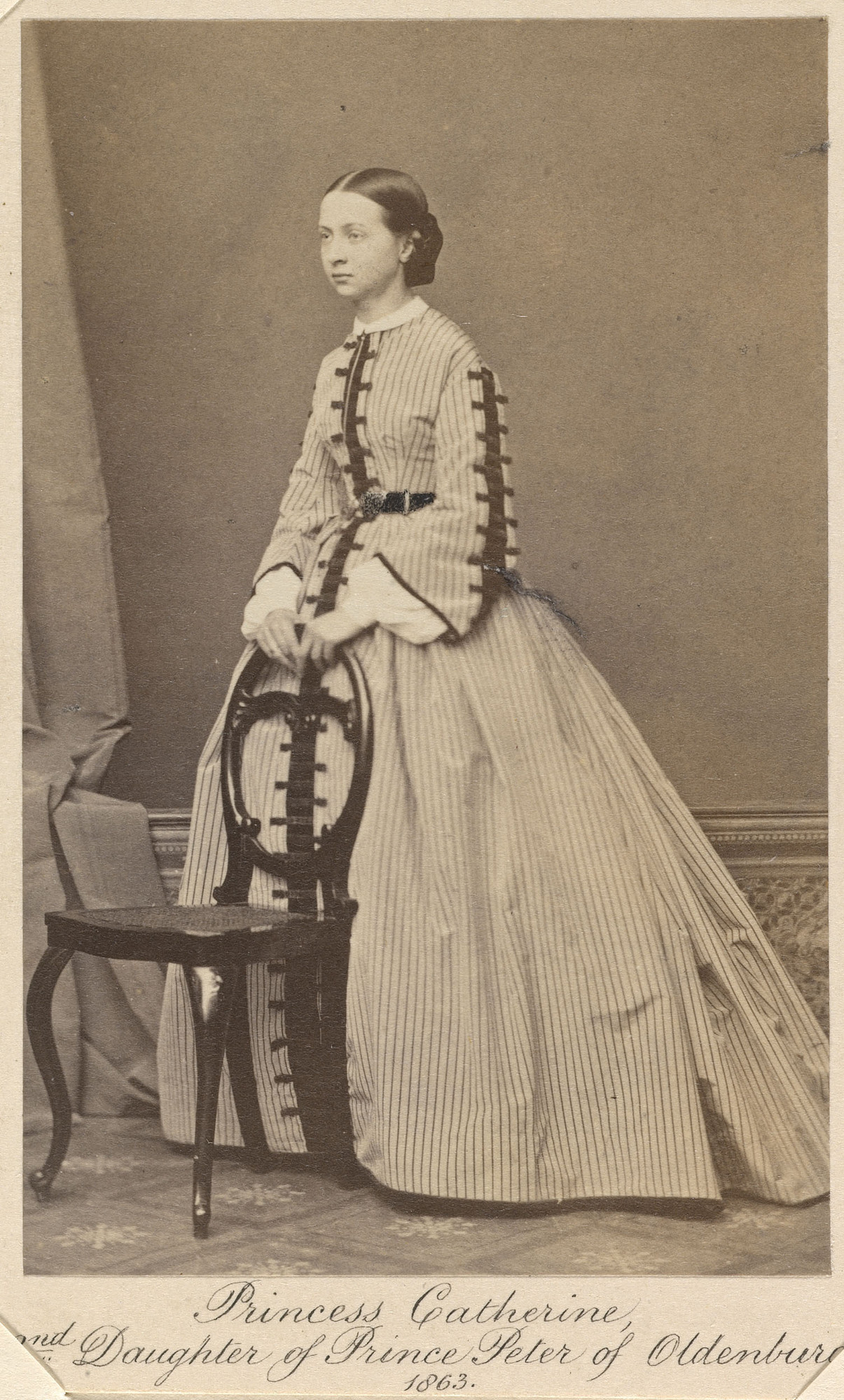
- Duchess Catherine, photographed in 1863
- Born: September 9, 1846; Saint Petersburg, Russian Empire
- Died: 11 June 1866 (aged 19); Styria, Austrian Empire
- House: Oldenburg
- Father: Duke Peter of Oldenburg
- Mother: Princess Therese of Nassau-Weilburg

Duchess Catherine Frederica Paulina of Oldenburg (9 September 1846 - 11 June 1866) was the daughter of Duke Peter of Oldenburg and Princess Therese of Nassau-Weilburg, and a great-granddaughter of Paul I of Russia.

== Biography ==
Catherine Frederica Paulina was born in St. Petersburg on 9 September 1846 as the 5th child and 3rd daughter of Duke Peter of Oldenburg and his German wife, Princess Therese of Nassau-Weilburg. Through her father she was a granddaughter of Grand Duchess Catherine Pavlovna of Russia and a great-granddaughter of Tsar Paul I of Russia. Through her mother she was a first cousin of Elisabeth of Wied, the first Queen of Romania.

Empress Maria Alexandrovna wanted to marry her oldest son Nicholas Alexandrovich to a second cousin. The marriage negotiations lasted for a long time and the Empress wanted to move Catherine into her palace, however the plans were stopped by her mother who couldn't stand the Empress. The conflict centered mainly on the Nassau Domain dispute, a long-standing disagreement between the Nassau-Weilburg and the Hesse-Darmstadt over territorial and dynastic claims.

According to the memoirs of Count Sergei Dmitrievich Sheremetev, a friend of hers, the relationship between Catherine and her mother was not distinguished by tender feelings or sincerity. In 1866 she developed consumption as a result of a cold after suffering from the measles. The doctors prescribed a mild climate for her and was therefore taken to Venice by her father, however it did nothing to restore her health.

== Death ==
She died on 11 June in Römerbad, a Spa in Styria, Austria, aged 19. Her body was transported back to Russia and she was buried in the Oldenburg family tomb in the St. Sergius Primorsky Hermitage in Strelna.

== Ancestry ==
Ancestors of Duchess Catherine of Oldenburg

8. Peter I, Grand Duke of Oldenburg
4. Duke George of Oldenburg
9. Frederica of Württemberg
2. Duke Peter of Oldenburg
10. Paul I of Russia
5. Catherine Pavlovna of Russia
11. Sophie Dorothea of Württemberg
1. Duchess Catherine of Oldenburg
12. Frederick William, Prince of Nassau-Weilburg
6. William, Duke of Nassau
13. Burgravine Louise Isabelle of Kirchberg
3. Princess Therese of Nassau-Weilburg
14. Frederick, Duke of Saxe-Altenburg
7. Princess Louise of Saxe-Hildburghausen
15. Duchess Charlotte Georgine of Mecklenburg-Strelitz

== Sources ==
- Мемуары графа С. Д. Шереметева: Т. 1. — 2004. — 736 с. — ISBN 5-85759-131-7
- И. Б. Чижова. Давно замолкшие слова. — 2006. — ISBN 5-699-15795-6. («Возлюбленный образ, с душой неразлучный»)
- Э. Анненкова. Принцессы Ольденбургские. — Москва: Издательский Дом ТОНЧУ, 2014. — 784 с.
