= Princess Marie of Württemberg (1816–1887) =

Countess of Neipperg (1816-1887)

- Countess von Neipperg
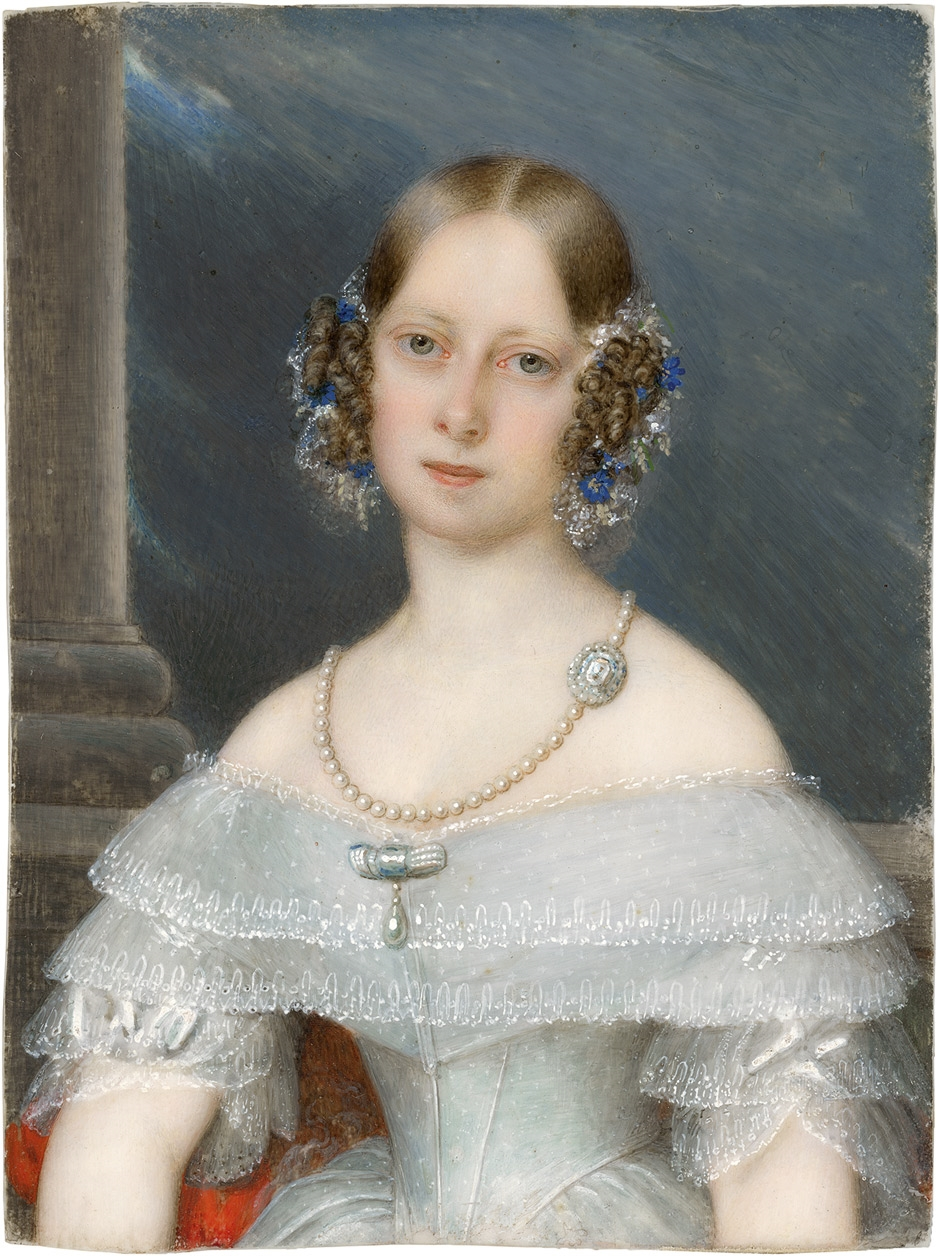
- Portrait, c. 1840
- Born: 30 October 1816; Stuttgart, Kingdom of Württemberg
- Died: 4 January 1887 (aged 70); Stuttgart, German Empire
- Spouse: Alfred von Neipperg (m. 1840; died 1865)
Names
- Marie Friederike Charlotte
- House: House of Württemberg
- Father: William I of Württemberg
- Mother: Catherine Pavlovna of Russia

Princess Marie of Württemberg (30 October 1816 – 4 January 1887) was the eldest daughter of William I of Württemberg and Catherine Pavlovna of Russia.

== Early life and family ==
Princess Marie Friederike Charlotte was the first child and eldest daughter of William I of Württemberg and Catherine Pavlovna of Russia. The princess was born on 30 October 1816 in Stuttgart, which was the same day her parents ascended the throne of Württemberg. Marie had a younger sister named Sophie, two half-brothers from her mother's first marriage, Alexander and Peter of Oldenburg, and three other half siblings, born by Marie's father's third wife, Pauline Therese: Catherine, Charles, and Augusta. According to Friedrich Wilhelm Hackländer, princess Marie was "lovely, delicated figure,... supremely graceful" (Note: German: "liebliche, zarte Erscheinung, ... in höchstem Grade anmutig.") and wealthy thanks to her mother's inheritance.

== Marriage ==
On 19 March 1840, Princess Marie married Count Alfred von Neipperg for love. After marriage, Marie was allowed to retain her title and rank as a member of the royal family and possessed a large estate. The couple lived in a childless, long-distance marriage: Marie resided in Stuttgart at the Princesses' Palace, later known as the Wilhelm Palace, co-owned by her sister Sophie, and only visited the Neipperg family estate in Schwaigern with her entourage during the summer months.

== Later life and death ==
In 1853, Count Alfred fell from a great height while hunting chamois near Bregenz and suffered a brain injury which necessitated his admission to the state mental asylum in Winnenden, where he died in 1865. This event made Marie, according to Baroness Eveline von Massenbach, go from a woman with "her otherwise gifted and amiable personality to become bitter and unpleasant due to pronounced brusqueness." (Note: German: "ihre sonst begabte und liebenswürdige Persönlichkeit bitter und ungenießbar werden durch hervortretende Schroffheiten.")

In the latter half of her life, Marie donated huge sums for charitable causes, particularly to the Marienpflege orphange in Ellwangen, where the princess served as patron from the age of 14.

Marie died on 4 January 1887 in Stuttgart, at the age of 70, and was buried in the royal mausoleum on Mount Württemberg in Stuttgart.

== Ancestry ==
Ancestors of Princess Marie of Württemberg (1816–1887)

8. Frederick II Eugene, Duke of Württemberg
4. Frederick I of Württemberg
9. Princess Friederike of Brandenburg-Schwedt
2. William I of Württemberg
10. Charles William Ferdinand, Duke of Brunswick
5. Duchess Auguste Karoline of Brunswick-Wolfenbüttel
11. Princess Augusta of Great Britain
1. Princess Marie of Württemberg
12. Peter III of Russia
6. Paul I of Russia
13. Catherine II of Russia
3. Grand Duchess Catherine Pavlovna of Russia
14. Frederick II Eugene, Duke of Württemberg (= 8)
7. Duchess Sophie Dorothea of Württemberg
15. Princess Friederike of Brandenburg-Schwedt (= 9)

== Bibliography ==
- Elias, Otto-Heinrich. "Marie Friederike Charlotte von Württemberg - Detailseite - LEO-BW". www.leo-bw.de.
- McNaughton, Arnold (1973a). The Book of Kings: a Royal Genealogy. Vol. 1. New York: Quadrangle/New York Times Book Co. ISBN 978-0-8129-0280-8.
- McNaughton, Arnold (1973b). The Book of Kings: a Royal Genealogy. Vol. 2. New York: Quadrangle/New York Times Book Co. ISBN 978-0-8129-0280-8.
