= Alfred von Neipperg =

German soldier and husband of Princess Marie of Württemberg

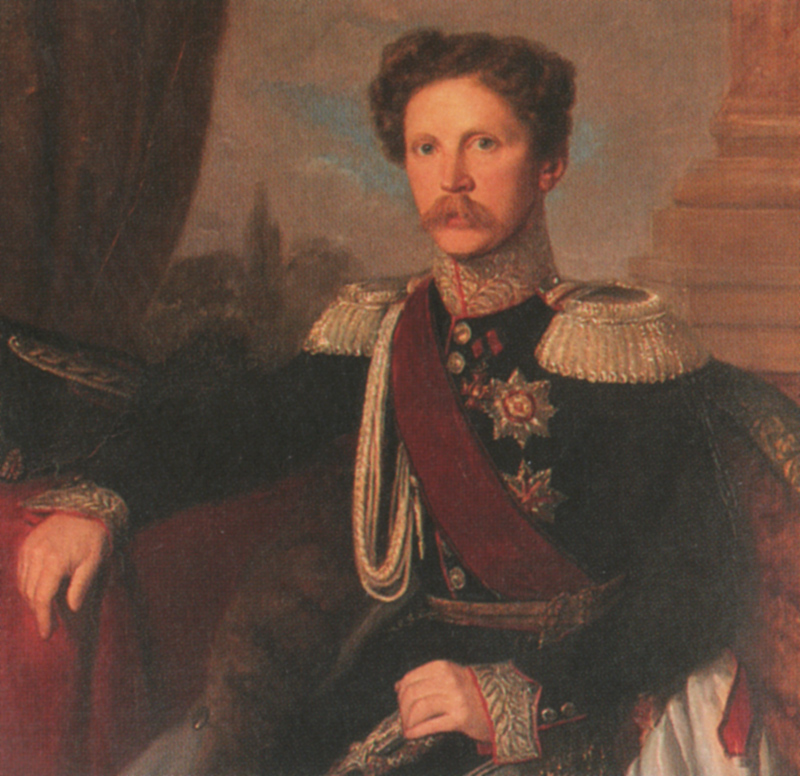
Portrait of Count von Neipperg, by Natale Schiavoni

Alfred, Count von Neipperg (26 January 1807 – 16 November 1865) was a German soldier who married into the Württemberg royal family. He was the son of the Austrian general and statesman, Count Adam Albert von Neipperg, who was the second husband of Empress Marie Louise, eldest child of Francis II, Holy Roman Emperor and widow of Napoleon. From his father's marriage to Marie Louise, Alfred had three younger half-siblings, including William Albert, 1st Prince of Montenuovo.

== Early life ==
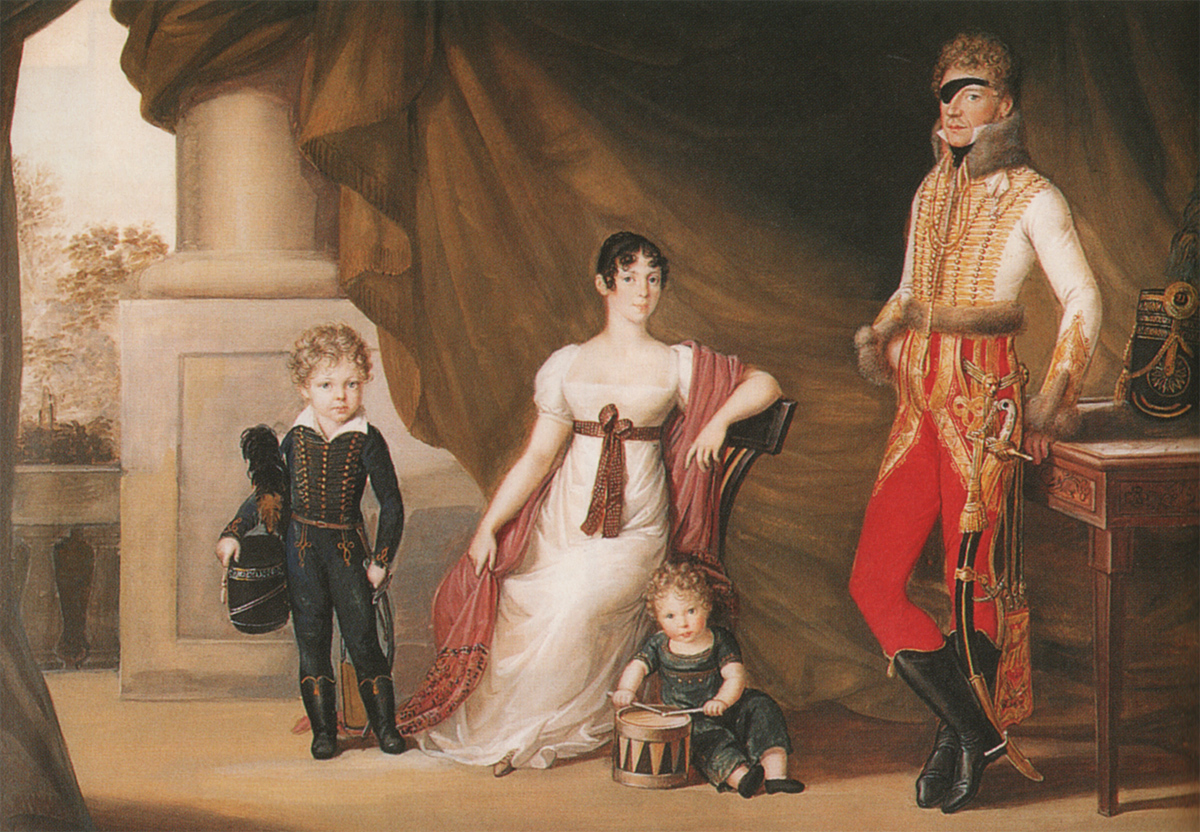
Portrait of his father and mother, and their children Alfred (left) and Ferdinand (right), by Giuseppe Lacedelli, 1810.

Neipperg was born on 26 January 1807 at Schwaigern in the Kingdom of Württemberg. He was the eldest son of Adam Albrecht Adrian, Count von Neipperg, and Theresia, Countess Pola di Treviso. After his mother's death, his father married Napoleon's widow, Marie Louise, Duchess of Parma (a daughter of Francis II, Holy Roman Emperor, and Maria Theresa of Naples and Sicily). Among his full siblings was younger brother Count Erwin von Neipperg. From his father's second marriage, his half-siblings were Countess Albertine di Montenuovo and William Albert, 1st Prince of Montenuovo. His father served as Prime Minister of Duchy of Parma from 1823 to 1829.

His maternal grandparents were Count Antonio of Pola di Treviso and Countess Maria Antonia Floriana of Thurn-Valsassina. His paternal grandparents were Leopold Johann Nepomuk, Count von Neipperg, a diplomat famous for inventing a letter-copying machine (himself the son of Count Wilhelm Reinhard von Neipperg), and Countess Marie Wilhelmine von Hatzfeldt-Wildenburg.

== Career ==
After the death of his father, he became head of the Neipperg family. Upon his death in 1865, he was succeeded as head of the family by his brother, Count Erwin von Neipperg.

== Personal life ==
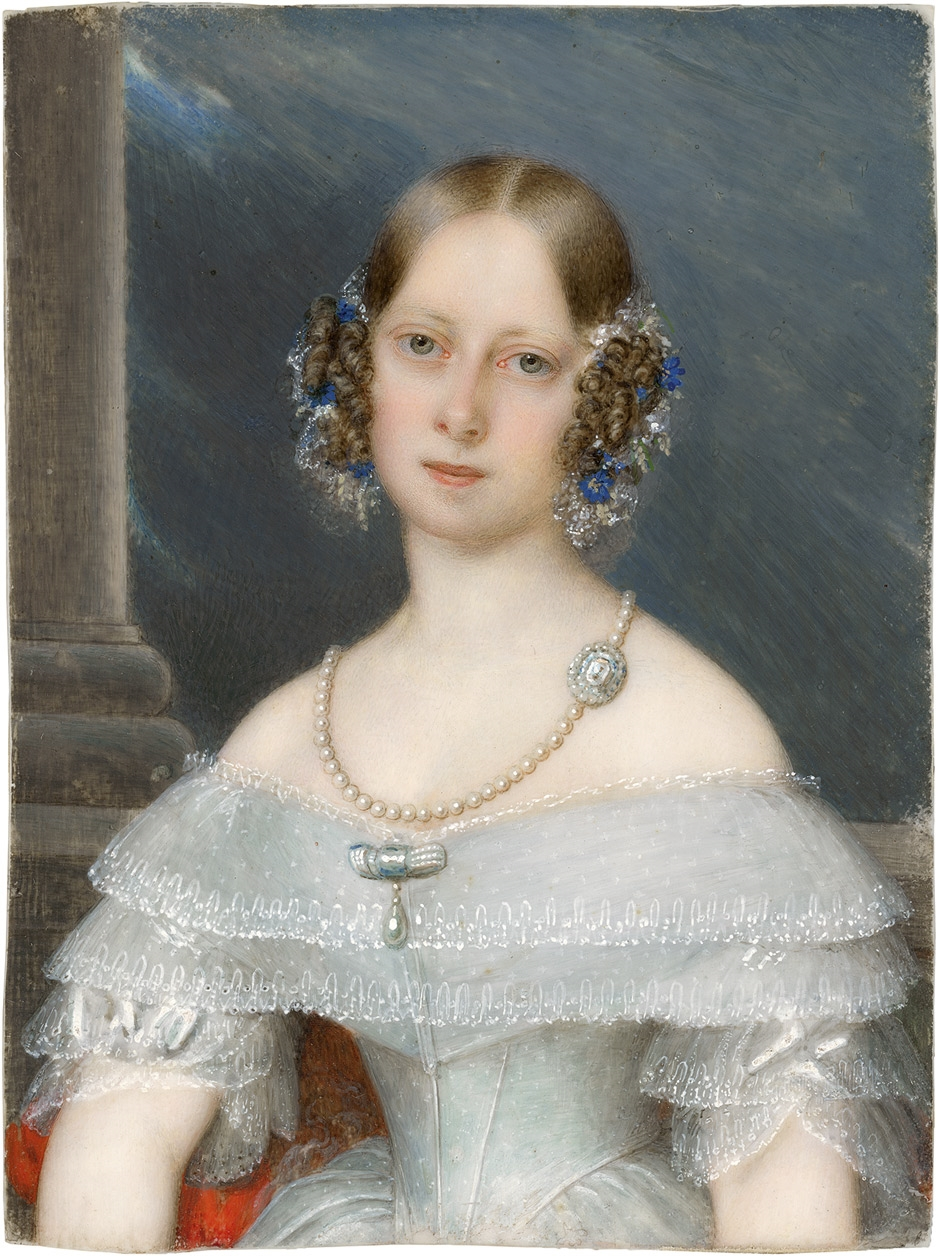
Portrait of Princess Marie Friederike Charlotte of Württemberg, later Countess Neipperg, by Johann Michael Holder, c. 1840

On 18 October 1835, he married Countess Giuseppina di Grisoni (1808–1837), a daughter of Francesco Grisoni and Maria Anna Catterina (née Pola) Grisoni.

On 19 March 1840, he married Princess Marie Friederike Charlotte of Württemberg (1816–1887). Princess Marie was a daughter of King William I of Württemberg and Grand Duchess Catherine Pavlovna of Russia. Reportedly, the marriage, was an unhappy one, as was his sister-in-law Sophie's marriage to King William III of the Netherlands. Marie's younger half-brother, Charles, became king in June 1864 following the death of her father.

Neipperg died on 16 November 1865, at age 58, at Winnenden, Germany.

== See also ==
- House of Württemberg
