= Princess Therese of Nassau-Weilburg =

Princess Therese
- Duchess Peter of Oldenburg
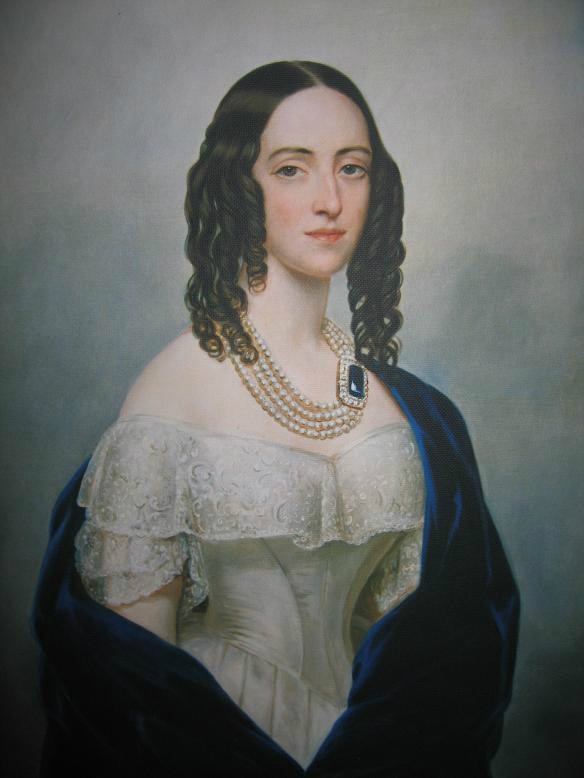
- Born: 17 April 1815; Weilburg, Duchy of Nassau
- Died: 8 December 1871 (aged 56); Prague, Kingdom of Bohemia
- Spouse: Duke Peter of Oldenburg (m. 1837)
- Issue: Alexandra, Grand Duchess Alexandra Petrovna of Russia; Duke Nicholas; Duchess Cecile; Duke Alexander; Duchess Catherine; Duke George; Duke Constantine; Therese, Princess Therese Petrovna Romanovskaya
Names
- German: Therese Wilhelmine Friederike Isabelle Charlotte
- House: Nassau-Weilburg
- Father: William, Duke of Nassau
- Mother: Princess Louise of Saxe-Hildburghausen

Princess Therese of Nassau-Weilburg (German: Therese Wilhelmine Friederike Isabelle Charlotte Prinzessin von Nassau-Weilburg; Russian: Терезия Васильевна Нассауская, Tereziya Vasilyevna Nassauskaya; 17 April 1815 in Weilburg, Duchy of Nassau – 8 December 1871 in Prague, Kingdom of Bohemia) was a member of the House of Nassau-Weilburg and a Princess of Nassau-Weilburg by birth. Through her marriage to Duke Peter of Oldenburg, Therese was also a Duchess of Oldenburg.

== Family ==
Therese was the second child and daughter of William, Duke of Nassau and his first wife Princess Louise of Saxe-Hildburghausen.

== Marriage and issue ==
Therese married Duke Peter of Oldenburg, second and younger son of Duke George of Oldenburg and his wife Catherine Pavlovna of Russia, on 23 April 1837 in Biebrich. Therese and Peter had eight children:

- Alexandra of Oldenburg (2 June 1838, St. Petersburg – 13 April 1900 Kiev, Ukraine); m. Grand Duke Nicholas Nikolaevich of Russia.
- Nicholas of Oldenburg (9 May 1840, St. Petersburg – 20 January 1886, Geneva, Switzerland); m. Maria Bulazel created Countess of Osternburg.
- Cecile of Oldenburg (27 February 1842 St. Petersburg – 11 January 1843, St. Petersburg)
- Alexander of Oldenburg (2 June 1844, St Petersburg, – 6 September 1932, Biarritz, France). Heir of the Russian Oldenburgs. He married Princess Eugenia Maximilianovna of Leuchtenberg. Their only son, Duke Peter Alexandrovich of Oldenburg, married Grand Duchess Olga Alexandrovna of Russia
- Catherine of Oldenburg (21 September 1846, St. Petersburg – 23 June 1866, St. Petersburg)
- George of Oldenburg (17 April 1848, St. Petersburg – 17 March 1871, St. Petersburg)
- Konstantin of Oldenburg (27 April 1850, St. Petersburg – 18 March 1906 in Nice, France); m. Princess Agrippina Japaridze, divorced Princess Dadiani and later created Countess of Zarnekau.
- Therese of Oldenburg (30 March 1852, St. Petersburg – 18 April 1883 St. Petersburg); m. George Maximilianovich, 6th Duke of Leuchtenberg (1852–1912)

== Ancestry ==
Ancestors of Princess Therese of Nassau-Weilburg

8. Charles Christian, Prince of Nassau-Weilburg
4. Frederick William, Prince of Nassau-Weilburg
9. Princess Carolina of Orange-Nassau
2. William, Duke of Nassau
10. Wilhelm Georg, Count of Sayn-Hachenburg, Burgrave of Kirchberg
5. Burgravine Louise Isabelle of Kirchberg
11. Princess Isabella Auguste Reuss of Greiz
1. Princess Therese of Nassau-Weilburg
12. Ernest Frederick III, Duke of Saxe-Hildburghausen
6. Frederick, Duke of Saxe-Altenburg
13. Princess Ernestine of Saxe-Weimar
3. Princess Louise of Saxe-Hildburghausen
14. Charles II, Grand Duke of Mecklenburg-Strelitz
7. Duchess Charlotte Georgine of Mecklenburg-Strelitz
15. Princess Friederike of Hesse-Darmstadt
