= Pola family =

Italian noble family

(de) Pola Castropola
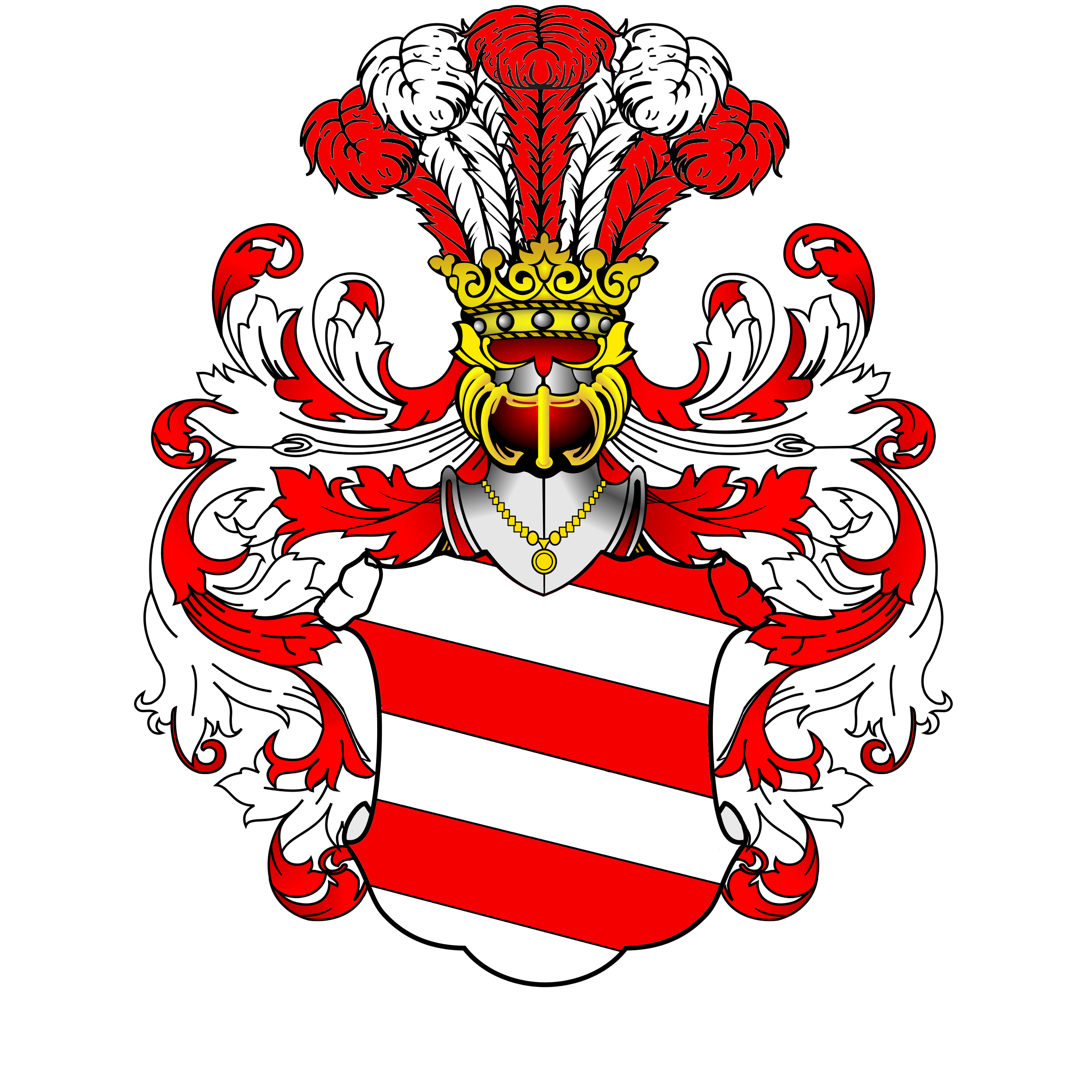
- Arms of Pola
- Country: Republic of Venice; Austrian Empire; Austria-Hungary; Czech Republic
- Founded: 990
- Founder: Sergio de Pola
- Current head: Bedřich II Pola
- Titles: Podestà di Pola (until 1331); Conte Pola (since 1331); Nobile di Treviso

The House of Pola (also Counts of Castropola, Sergi) is an Italian noble family currently living in the Czech Republic. The origins of the House of Pola date back at least until 990. The name of the family refers to the town of Pula (Italian: Pola) in Istria County, Croatia, which was in their possession from 1271 until 1331.

== History ==
The family is mentioned for the first time in 990, when Sergio de Pola donated the property to the monastery of San Michele in Monte near Pula. However, the family refers to the Roman patrician gens Sergia, which lived in Pula in the time of the Roman Empire.

The family tree starts in 1180 with Bonifacio Sergi who became the collector of taxes in the March of Istria. His three sons founded two branches of the family in 13th century - the Istrian branch (Galvano) and a branch of Treviso (Nascinguerra I). The family gained importance in 1265, when Monfiorito da Pola became the Vicarius of the counts of Gorzia in Istria.

=== Year 1271 ===
1271 won the authoritative party, which leader was the Sergi family the political fight against the democratic party (Jonatasi family) in the city of Pula and Sergi made themselves the Lords of Pola. The Sergi family moved to the castle of Pola and changed its name to Castropola. According to legend the Jonatasi family did not accept the Castropola as their lords and they attacked the Good Friday procession, where took Castropola place and slaughtered all but one family members. The only survived was a small boy, which has been rescued by his valet, which hid him in the monastery in Pula. However, this legend is not true.

In 1285 Monfiorito da Pola was replaced by his brother Nascinguerra II da Pola, which had been knighted and his son Matteo da Pola became in 1280 the bishop of Pula. In 1294 were extended the powers of the government of Castropola family, that should became the break against the Venetian influence in Istria. Because of that was the property power of the family extended, too, so Castropola became one of the richest families in Istria. The family felt powerful enough to come out against the Republic of Venice, but it was defeated and had to leave Pula in 1331. The family moved to another family branch, which lived in Treviso. Its members served the Republic of Venice and got the title of Count. The family had branched to many lines, which have moved to Milan, back to Istria and to the Holy Roman Empire.

=== Branch of Treviso ===
This branch was founded by Nascinguerra I. His son Bonifacio I. da Pola became between years 1269-1283 the mayor of Treviso. In 1331 jointed the branch with another family part, which had to leave Istria. The family became very rich because of Sergio III. da Pola, which was a perfect businessman. One of his sons, Francesco de Pola studied the law in Padua and in 1431 he became the doctor of law. The pope Eugene IV made him the chief judge of Rome. Francesco reached the big gravity. He died in 1450. In the next generation aroused public notice Bernardino de Pola, which built the Pola palace in Treviso. The architect was Pietro Lombardi. From the world of culture is also famous Laura da Pola, because of her painting from Lorenzo Lotto. In 1569 fought Sergio da Pola against the Osman Empire in Cyprus. His brother Ansoisio da Pola married in 1575 Lavinia Caetani. The Caetani were one of the most important Roman families, that gave to the church two popes and with the Colonna and Orsini family was the most powerful family of Rome. The son of Ansoisio, Filippo Cristoforo, moved in 1607 to Bohemia, where live his descendants up to the present day, without being confirmed as a bohemian noble family - so they count not to the bohemian nobility. In their possession is the Bukovec Castle. The next important member of the family was Pietro de Pola. He was a knight of the Order of St. Mark - the most important venetian order. In the same order was also Paolo di Pola since 1675. His namesake Count Paolo de Pola married Isabelle Gonzaga di Luzzara, so the Pola family were ally with the dukes of Mantua. Camillo de Pola became in 1721 the knight of Sovereign Military Order of Malta. One of the most important family members was count Paolo Luigi di Pola, since 1807 Knight of the Order of the Iron Crown and "ciambellano della corte del Vicere". He was a personal friend of Napoleon Bonaparte, which visited him in his palace in Treviso. 5 August was count Antonio di Pola confirmed as the noble of Treviso, so he counts to the Austrian nobility.

== Notable family members ==
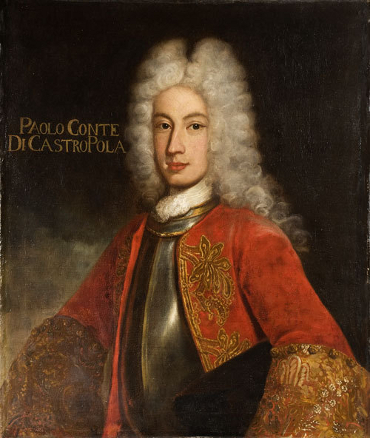
Count Paolo Pola, since 1675 knight of the Order of St. Mark

- Monfiorito da Pola, in 1265, chief judge of Istria County.
- Nascinguerra da Pola, in 1285, chief judge of Istria County.
- Matteo da Pola, since 1280, Bishop of Pula.
- Sergius II da Pola, generale e capitano perpetuo di Pola, in 1318 - 1319 he commanded the istrian fleet against Venice. In 1319 he won the battle against Nicolo Badoer.
- Francesco de Pola - in 1431 doctor of law in Padua, chief judge of city of Rome.
- Laura da Pola - in 1544 painted by the Venetian painter Lorenzo Lotto a very famous portrait of her.
- Laura da Pola - 1604 wife of baron Niccolo Colloredo, ancestor of the princely line Colloredo-Mansfeld.
- Paolo Pola - 1675, knight of the Order of St. Mark.
- Francesco Alberti di Pola - since 1677 prince - bishop of Trent.
- Sergio Pola - titular bishop of Famagusta from 1706.
- Camillo Pola - receiver of the Order of Malta in Venice from 1721.
- Paolo Luigi di Pola – knighted in the Order of the Iron Crown in 1807 and ciambellano della corte del Vicere, and a friend of Napoleon Bonaparte.
- Teresa Pola - married general and diplomat Count Adam Albert von Neipperg in 1806.
- Bedřich Pola - founder of the first private integrated circuit development centre in the Czech and Slovak Federative Republic and the owner of Castle Bukovec.

== Gallery ==
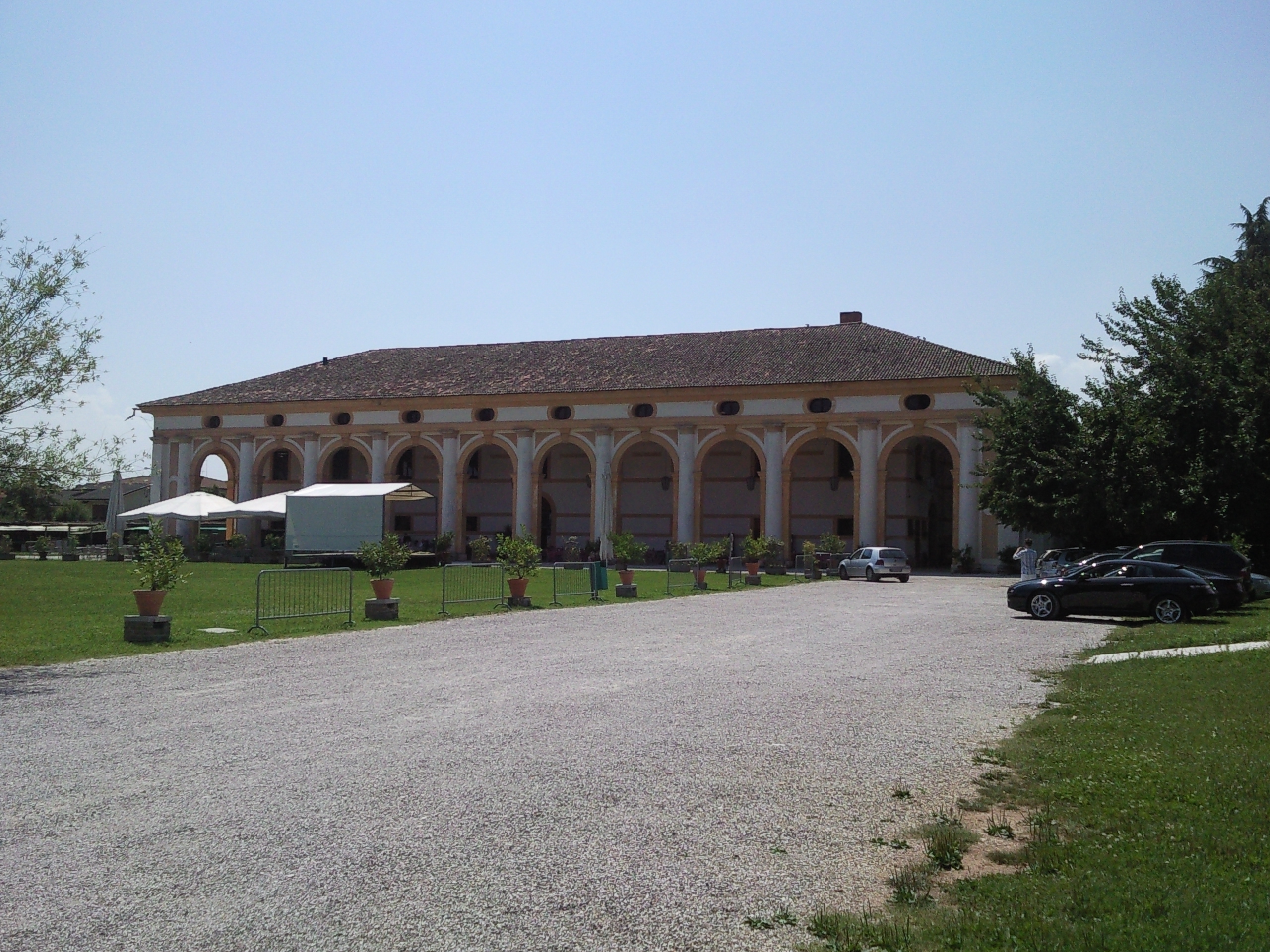
Barchessa Villa Pola.

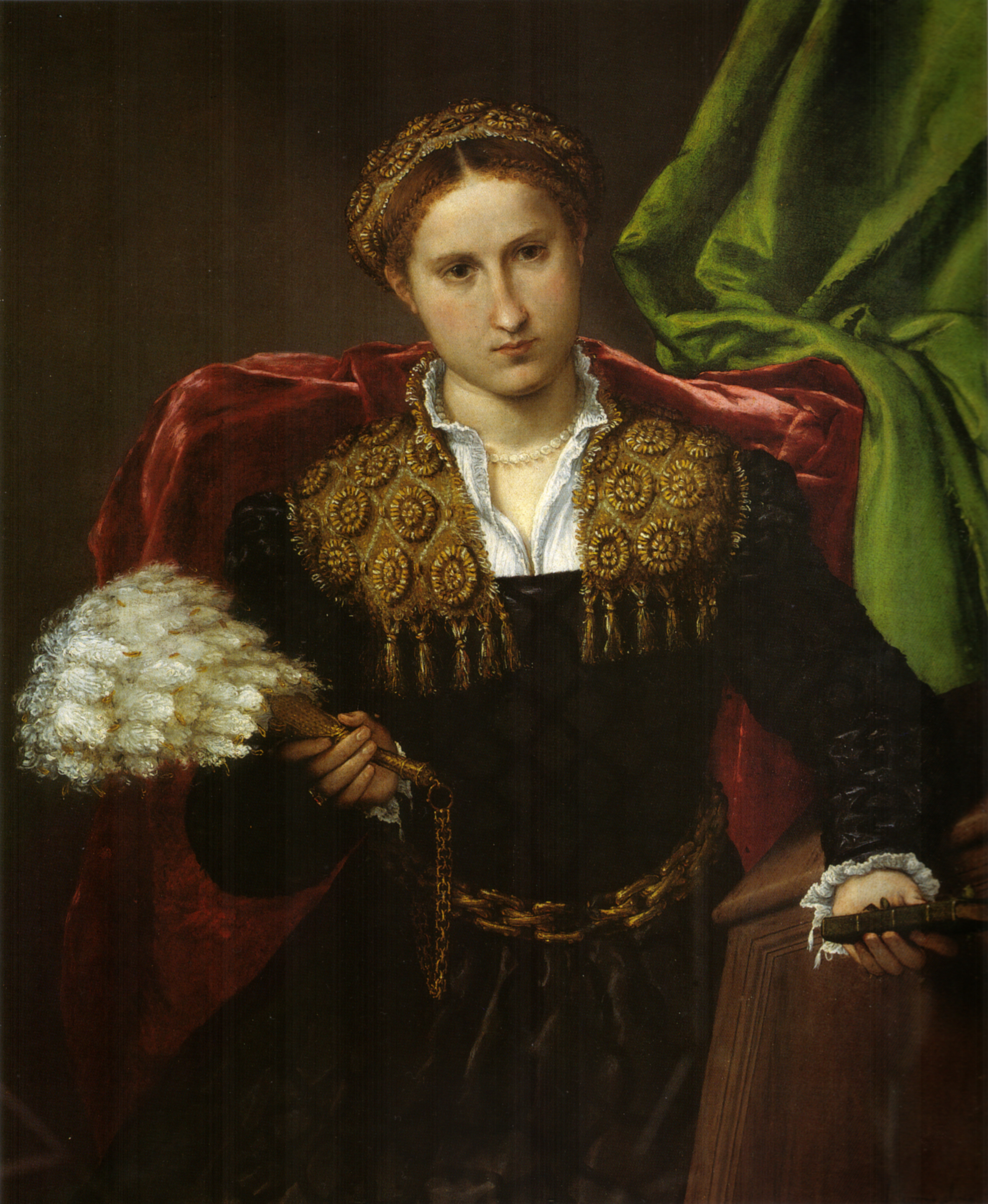
Laura da Pola, painted in 1544 by Lorenzo Lotto.

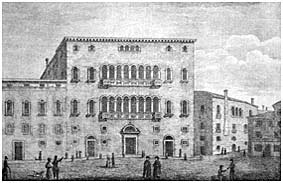
Pola palace in Treviso

== Sources ==
- Luigi Urettini: La lacrimevole istoria del conte Titta Pola (it), Treviso 2007
- Alteniero Degli Azzoni Avogadro: 1796 - 1803 - Vita privata e publicca nelle Provincie venete (da memorie e documenti inediti) (it), Libreria editrice Canova, Treviso 1954, S. 249
- Camillo De Franceschi: Il Comune polese e la signoria dei Castropola, AMSI 1904
- B. Benussi: Povijest Pule u svjetskih municipalnih ustanova do 1918, Pula 2002
