= Joseph, Duke of Saxe-Altenburg =

Duke of Saxe-Altenburg from 1834 to 1848

Joseph
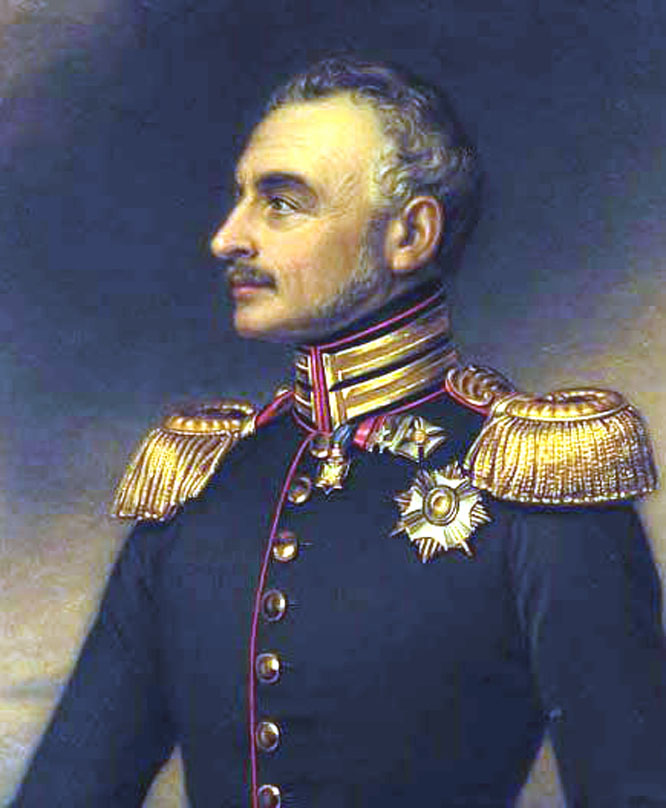
- Portrait c. 1848

Duke of Saxe-Altenburg
- Reign: 29 September 1834 – 30 November 1848
- Predecessor: Frederick
- Successor: George
- Born: 27 August 1789; Hildburghausen, Saxe-Altenburg
- Died: 25 November 1868 (aged 79); Altenburg, Saxe-Altenburg
- Spouse: Duchess Amelia of Württemberg (m. 1817; died 1848)
- Issue: Marie, Queen of Hanover; Princess Pauline; Princess Therese; Elisabeth, Grand Duchess of Oldenburg; Alexandra Iosifovna, Grand Duchess of Russia; Princess Luise
Names
- Joseph Georg Friedrich Ernst Karl
- House: Wettin
- Father: Frederick, Duke of Saxe-Altenburg
- Mother: Duchess Charlotte Georgine of Mecklenburg-Strelitz
- Religion: Lutheranism

Joseph (Joseph Georg Friedrich Ernst Karl; 27 August 1789 – 25 November 1868) was Duke of Saxe-Altenburg from 1834 to 1848.

== Early life ==
Joseph was born on 27 August 1789, the second but first surviving son of Frederick, Duke of Saxe-Hildburghausen (of Saxe-Altenburg from 1826) and Duchess Charlotte Georgine of Mecklenburg-Strelitz.

=== Education and military service ===
The birth of Joseph was greeted with cannon fire in Hildburghausen. He was educated by Friedrich August Scheler, the Coburg court lawyer. in 1806, at his mother's request, Joseph began his studies at the University of Erlangen-Nuremberg. On 9 January 1814, Joseph was enlisted as a volunteer officer in the Prussian army and assigned to Lieutenant General, Friedrich Graf Kleist von Nollendorf. Together with his brother Georg, he fought in the Wars of Liberation against France. On 19 August 1816, Joseph left active service as a major in the Guard Uhlan Regiment. He later held the rank of General Major in Saxon services.

=== Succession ===
In 1826, following the extinction of the senior line of Saxe-Gotha-Altenburg, Ernestine duchies were reorganized. As part of the territorial adjustment, Joseph's father, Frederick, Duke Saxe-Hildburghausen left the Duchy of Saxe-Hildburghausen on 17 November 1826, and became Duke of the newly created Saxe-Altenburg. Joseph thus became the Hereditary Prince of Saxe-Altenburg instead.

In 1830, he was made co-regent to his father. In 1833, on his father's behalf, Joseph renewed the Ducal of Saxe-Ernestine House Order together with Ernest I, Duke of Saxe-Coburg and Gotha and Bernhard II, Duke of Saxe-Meiningen. Joseph succeeded his father as Duke of Saxe-Altenburg after his death in 1834.

== Reign and abdication ==
During his reign, he carried out several building projects in Altenburg. In 1841, he established a new princely crypt in the cemetery of Altenburg. The restoration of the residential palace, which had begun under his father, was continued under Joseph. He ruled conservatively and was unwilling to implement reforms. State parliament sessions were not open to public, and guild restrictions remained in place, which hindered industry and trade. he was forced to abdicate during the Civil Revolution of 1848, two days after the death of his wife, and his younger brother Georg succeeded him.

== Later life and death ==
After his abdication, Joseph lived primarily at the Fröhliche Wiederkunft Castle in Wolfersdorf. He supported artistic and scientific projects and had several paintings in Altenburg Town Hall restored at his expense.

On 30 June 1866, after the Battle of Langensalza, he welcomed his son-in-law, the recently deposed George V of Hanover to Fröhliche Wiederkunft Castle. Joseph died on 25 November 1868 in Altenburg at the age of 79.

== Marriage and issue ==
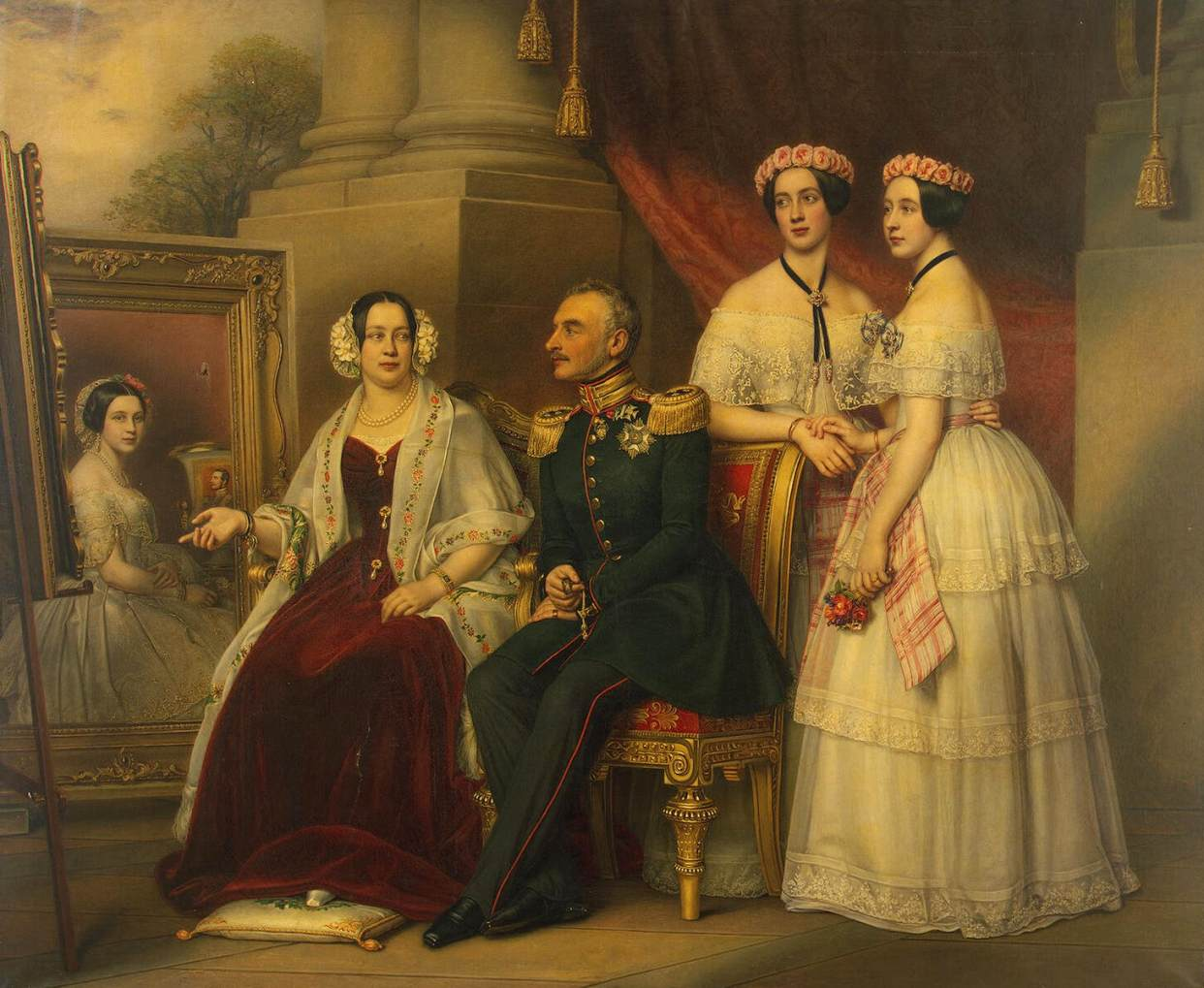
Joseph with his family (portrait by Joseph Karl Stieler, 1848)

In Kirchheim unter Teck on 24 April 1817, Joseph married Amelia of Württemberg, a daughter of Duke Louis of Württemberg. They had six daughters:

- Marie (b. Hildburghausen, 14 April 1818 – d. Gmunden, 9 January 1907), married on 18 February 1843 to King George V of Hanover.
- Pauline (b. Kirchheim unter Teck, 24 November 1819 – d. Hildburghausen, 11 January 1825) died in childhood.
- Therese (b. Hildburghausen, 9 October 1823 – d. Altenburg, 3 April 1915) died unmarried without issue.
- Elisabeth (b. Hildburghausen, 26 March 1826 – d. Oldenburg, 2 February 1896), married on 10 February 1852 to Peter II, Grand Duke of Oldenburg.
- Alexandra (upon her marriage, she took the name Alexandra Iosifovna in a Russian Orthodox baptism) (b. Altenburg, 8 July 1830 – d. St. Petersburg, 6 July 1911), married on 11 September 1848 to Grand Duke Konstantin Nikolayevich of Russia.
- Luise (b. Altenburg, 4 June 1832 – d. Hummelshain, 29 August 1833) died in infancy.

== Ancestry ==
Ancestors of Joseph, Duke of Saxe-Altenburg

8. Ernest Frederick II, Duke of Saxe-Hildburghausen
4. Ernest Frederick III, Duke of Saxe-Hildburghausen
9. Countess Caroline of Erbach-Fürstenau
2. Frederick, Duke of Saxe-Altenburg
10. Ernest Augustus I, Duke of Saxe-Weimar-Eisenach
5. Princess Ernestine of Saxe-Weimar
11. Princess Sophie Charlotte of Brandenburg-Bayreuth
1. Joseph, Duke of Saxe-Altenburg
12. Duke Charles Louis Frederick of Mecklenburg
6. Charles II, Grand Duke of Mecklenburg-Strelitz
13. Princess Elisabeth Albertine of Saxe-Hildburghausen
3. Duchess Charlotte Georgine of Mecklenburg-Strelitz
14. Prince George William of Hesse-Darmstadt
7. Princess Friederike of Hesse-Darmstadt
15. Countess Maria Louise Albertine of Leiningen-Dagsburg-Falkenburg

== Honours ==
He received the following orders and decorations:

- (Saxe-Coburg and Gotha) (Duchy of Saxe-Altenburg) (Saxe-Meiningen) Ernestine duchies: Grand Cross of the Saxe-Ernestine House Order, December 1833; Joint Grand Master, 29 September 1834
- Ascanian duchies: Grand Cross of Albert the Bear, 24 March 1843
- Baden:
  - Grand Cross of the House Order of Fidelity, 1832
  - Grand Cross of the Zähringer Lion, 1832
- Kingdom of Bavaria: Knight of St. Hubert, 1810
- Belgium: Grand Cordon of the Order of Leopold, 30 November 1840
- Kingdom of Greece: Grand Cross of the Redeemer
- Kingdom of Hanover: Knight of St. George, 1843
- (Hohenzollern-Sigmaringen) Hohenzollern: Cross of Honour of the Princely House Order of Hohenzollern, 1st Class
- Oldenburg: Grand Cross of the Order of Duke Peter Friedrich Ludwig, with Golden Crown, 29 May 1847
- Kingdom of Prussia: Knight of the Black Eagle, November 1849
- Russian Empire:
  - Knight of St. Andrew
  - Knight of St. Alexander Nevsky
  - Knight of the White Eagle
  - Knight of St. Anna, 1st Class
- Saxe-Weimar-Eisenach: Grand Cross of the White Falcon, 10 October 1834
- Kingdom of Saxony: Knight of the Rue Crown, 1832
- Württemberg: Grand Cross of the Württemberg Crown, 1825

Preceded by Frederick	Duke of Saxe-Altenburg; 1834–1848	Succeeded by Georg
