= ASIX s.r.o. =

Czech electronics company

- Industry: Electronics
- Founded: 1991
- Headquarters: Prague, Czech Republic
- Key people: Bedřich Pola
- Website: www.asix.net

ASIX s.r.o. is an electronics company, located in Prague, Czech Republic.

== About the company ==
The company was founded in 1991.
