= Catherine Pavlovna of Russia =

Queen of Württemberg from 1816 to 1819

Ekaterina Pavlovna
- Duchess George of Oldenburg
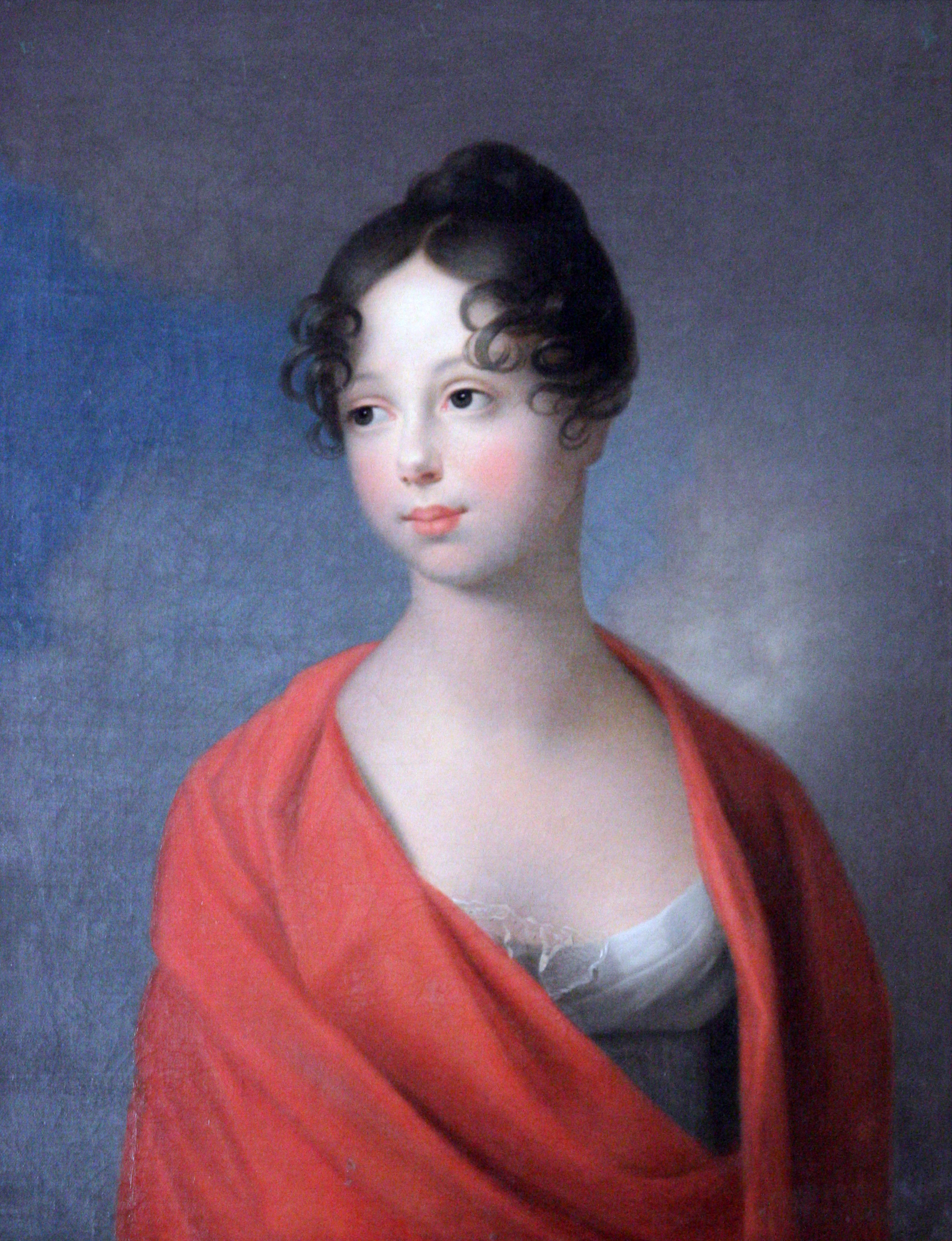
- Portrait by Johann Friedrich August Tischbein

Queen consort of Württemberg
- Tenure: 30 October 1816 – 9 January 1819
- Born: 21 May 1788; Catherine Palace, Saint Petersburg, Russian Empire
- Died: 9 January 1819 (aged 30); Stuttgart, Württemberg
- Burial: Württemberg Mausoleum, Stuttgart
- Spouse: Duke George of Oldenburg (m. 1809; died 1812) William I of Württemberg (m. 1816)
- Issue: Duke Alexander Georgievich of Oldenburg; Duke Peter of Oldenburg; Marie, Countess of Neipperg; Sophie, Queen of the Netherlands
- House: Holstein-Gottorp-Romanov
- Father: Paul I of Russia
- Mother: Duchess Sophie Dorothea of Württemburg

Ekaterina Pavlovna of Russia (Russian: Екатерина Павловна; 21 May [O.S. 10 May] 1788 – 9 January 1819) was Queen of Württemberg from 30 October 1816 until her death in 1819 as the wife of William I of Württemberg.

Ekaterina was born as the fourth daughter of Emperor Paul I of Russia and Duchess Sophie Dorothea of Württemberg. She firstly married Duke George of Oldenburg in 1809 until his death in 1812, remarrying to William I of Württemberg in 1816.

== Early life ==
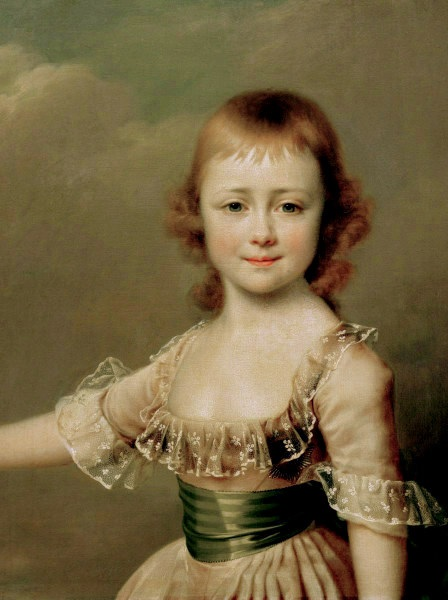
1790s portrait by Dmitry Levitzky

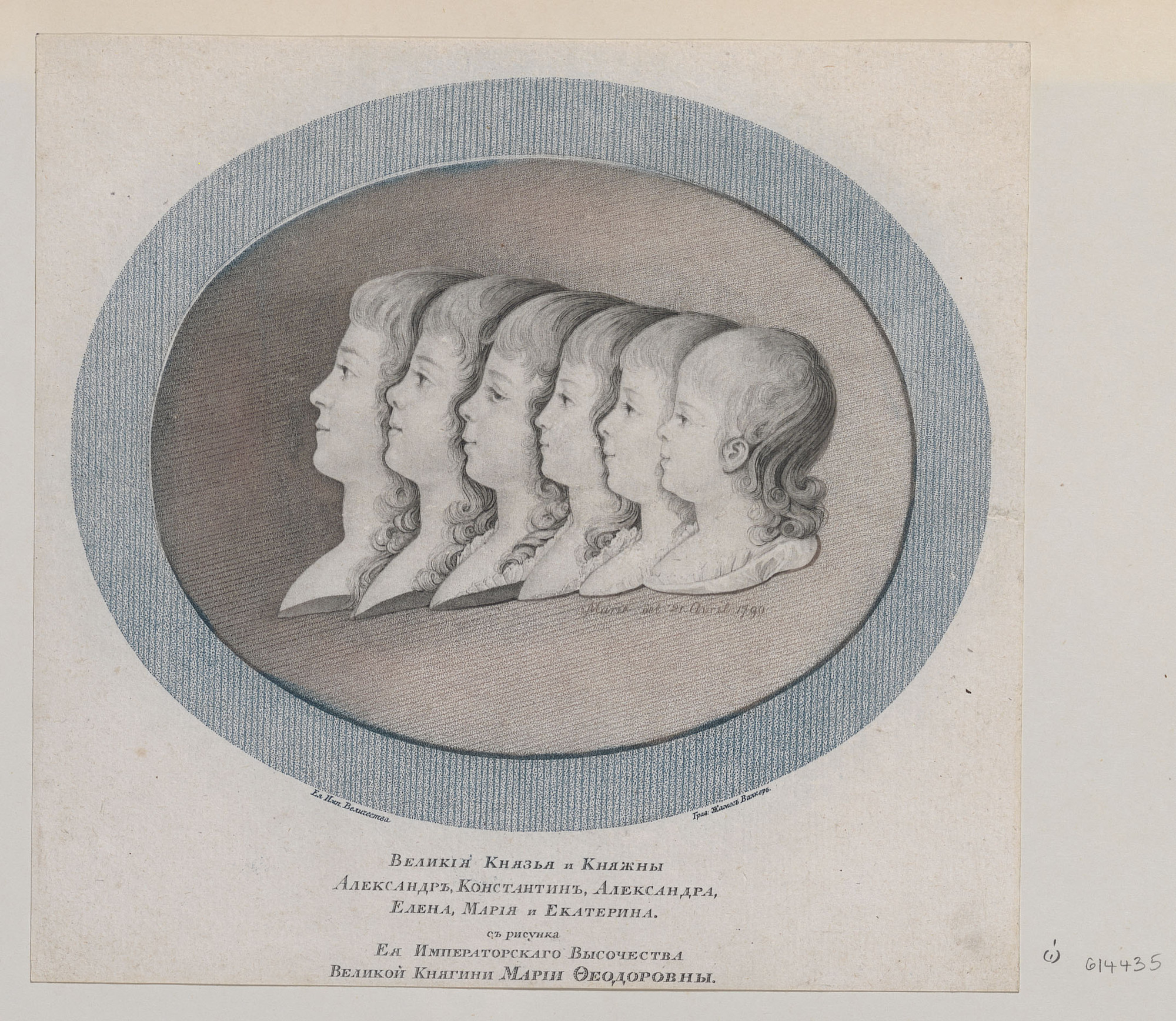
Grand Dukes Alexander and Konstantin Pavlovichi: Grand Duchesses Alexandra, Elena, Maria and Ekaterina Pavlovna. From a cameo made by Grand Duchess Maria Feodorovna in 1790

Ekaterina was born in Tsarskoye Selo and named after her grandmother, Catherine the Great. Described as beautiful and vivacious, she had a happy childhood and her education was carefully supervised by her mother. Ekaterina received the best education and constantly furthered her education through reading new literary publications and personal contacts with various outstanding persons. Known as Katya in the family, she was very close to her siblings, particularly her eldest brother Tsar Alexander I. Throughout her life she would maintain a close relationship with him. It was said that she was Alexander's favorite sister and one of the few persons he loved unconditionally. His letters to her are expressed in phrases like "I am yours, heart and soul, for life", "I think that I love you more with each day that passes" and "to love you more than I do is impossible". Although Paul and Maria Feodorovna were initially disappointed at the birth of a fourth daughter, Ekaterina later became her mother's favorite daughter.

== First marriage ==
While the Napoleonic Wars were still in progress, the childless Napoléon I arranged his divorce from his beloved but aged wife Empress Joséphine in order to marry a princess of high birth, get connected to royalty and beget the much desired heir. While the divorce itself did not happen until 1810, Napoleon was on the lookout for a new wife for some years previous to that, and seriously considered Ekaterina as a candidate – in addition to everything else, such a marriage would also provide strategic advantage by drawing the Russians to his side. The matter was broached or hinted at by the French delegation, at the behest of Talleyrand, at a meeting between them and the Russians at Erfurt in 1808. Ekaterina's family was utterly horrified, and the Dowager Empress immediately arranged a marriage for her daughter to her nephew, Duke George of Oldenburg.

Thus, Ekaterina was married to her first cousin Duke George of Oldenburg on 3 August 1809. George was the second son of Peter, Duke of Oldenburg and his wife, Duchess Friederike of Württemberg. The couple resided in Tver, where George had been appointed governor general. Catherine lived a lavish court life and entertained with balls, grand dinners and similar events in the pattern of the Imperial court, to create "a Small Saint Petersburg" in Tver. The couple were quickly blessed with two sons: Peter George in 1810 and Konstantin Friedrich Peter 1812. Although the match had been arranged by their families, Ekaterina was devoted to her husband and the marriage was harmonious. It was said that he was not handsome but Ekaterina cared for him deeply, and his death in 1812, due to typhoid fever, was a very severe shock to her. They had been married barely three years, and Ekaterina, now the mother of two infant sons, was only 24 years old.

While residing in Tver with George, Ekaterina supported Nikolay Karamzin to write his later famous historical work. Tsar Alexander adopted reactionary ideas from a patriotic group which she dominated. In 1812, some conspirators who planned to depose Tsar Alexander had the ambitions to put her on the throne as Empress Catherine III. In 1812, she supported the suggestion to summon a national militia and formed a special regiment of chasseurs which took part in many of the great battles of the era.

== Queen consort of Württemberg ==
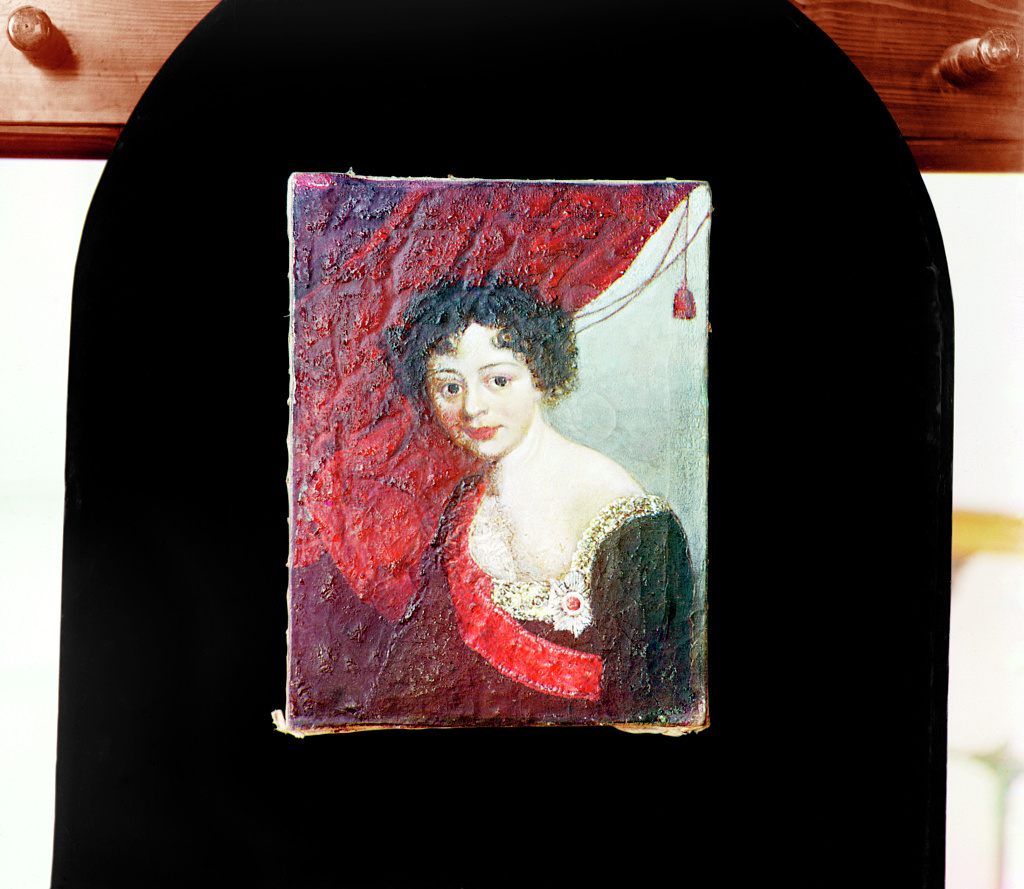
Portrait of the Grand Duchess Ekaterina Pavlovna by Sergey Prokudin-Gorsky, 1910. (Tver Museum)

Following the death of her husband, Ekaterina spent much of the next few years with her siblings, especially her brother the Tsar with whom she had a very close relationship. During 1813–1815, she travelled to England with her brother Tsar Alexander I to meet the Prince Regent. She was again with her brother during the Congress of Vienna in 1815. She was not without influence upon his political acts during these trips. She also promoted the marriage between her youngest sister Anna and William II of the Netherlands during this time.

In England, Ekaterina met her first cousin, the Crown Prince William of Württemberg. It was love at first sight for the couple. However, William was married to Princess Caroline Augusta of Bavaria; he took the drastic step of divorcing her. The background to this turn of events is that William and Caroline Augusta had hastily married each other in order to avoid a political marriage devised by Napoleon. They had never got on with each other, and both of them claimed, at the time of seeking an annulment, that their marriage had never been consummated. The annulment was duly granted by the papacy on grounds of non-consummation. Shortly afterwards in 1816, Caroline Augusta married Francis I of Austria and became Empress Consort of Austria.

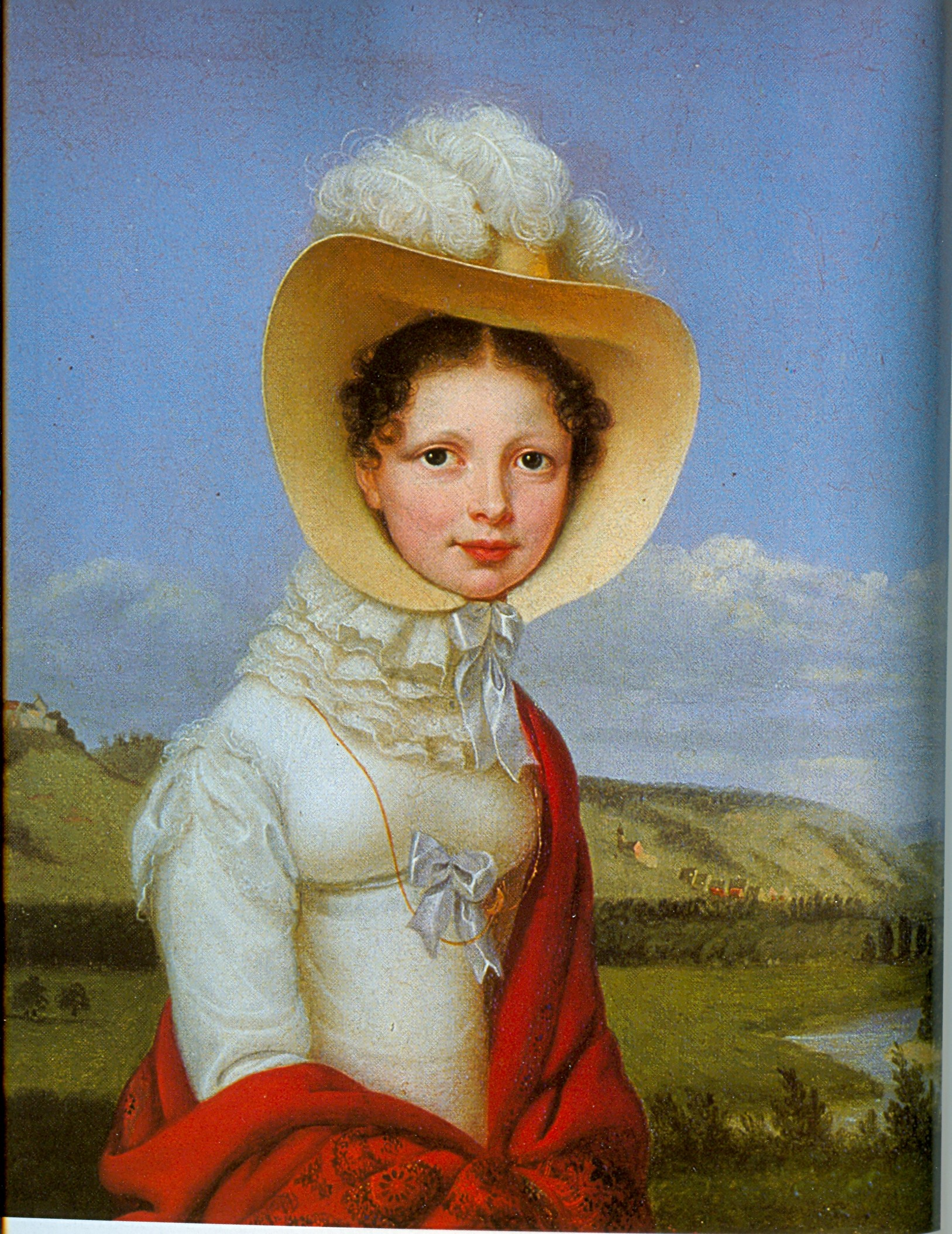
Portrait of Queen Catherine by Franz Seraph Stirnbrand, 1819

Very early in the year 1816, Ekaterina was married to the newly divorced William. The wedding was held in Saint Petersburg. The couple immediately had a daughter, Marie Friederike Charlotte, who was born on 30 October 1816, perchance the very day on which Ekaterina's father-in-law Frederick I of Wurttemberg died. The day therefore marked her husband's accession as king, and Ekaterina, now Queen Katharina of Württemberg, became active in charity works in her adopted homeland. She established numerous institutions for the benefit of the public. She supported elementary education and organized a charity foundation during the hunger of 1816. In 1818, she gave birth to another daughter, Sophie Frederike Mathilde, who would marry Ekaterina's nephew William III of Orange and become Queen of the Netherlands.

== Death ==
In January 1819, six months after the birth of her youngest child, Ekaterina died at Stuttgart of erysipelas complicated by pneumonia. She was thirty years old, and left behind four children, the eldest of whom was barely eight years old. The children were dispersed across two different families. Later, her surviving husband built Württemberg Mausoleum in Rotenberg, Stuttgart, dedicated to her memory. William later married again; his next wife was his first cousin, Duchess Pauline Therese of Württemberg.

== Issue ==
Ekaterina had two sons with Duke George of Oldenburg:

- Duke Peter Georg Paul Alexander of Oldenburg (30 August 1810 – 16 November 1829)
- Duke Konstantin Friedrich Peter of Oldenburg (26 August 1812 – 14 May 1881); married Princess Therese of Nassau-Weilburg and had issue

With the King of Württemberg, she had two daughters:

- Princess Maria Friederike Charlotte of Württemberg (30 October 1816 – 4 January 1887); married Count Alfred von Neipperg (1807–1865), eldest son of Count Adam Albert von Neipperg and his first wife, Countess Teresa of Pola-Treviso (1778–1815), stepson of Marie Louise, Duchess of Parma.
- Princess Sophie Friederike Mathilde of Württemberg (17 June 1818 – 3 June 1877); married King William III of the Netherlands.

== Ancestry ==
Ancestors of Catherine Pavlovna of Russia

8. Charles Frederick, Duke of Holstein-Gottorp
4. Peter III of Russia
9. Grand Duchess Anna Petrovna of Russia
2. Paul I of Russia
10. Christian August, Prince of Anhalt-Zerbst
5. Catherine II of Russia
11. Princess Johanna Elisabeth of Holstein-Gottorp
1. Grand Duchess Catherine Pavlovna of Russia
12. Charles Alexander, Duke of Württemberg
6. Frederick II Eugene, Duke of Württemberg
13. Princess Marie Auguste of Thurn and Taxis
3. Duchess Sophie Dorothea of Württemberg
14. Frederick William, Margrave of Brandenburg-Schwedt
7. Princess Friederike of Brandenburg-Schwedt
15. Princess Sophia Dorothea of Prussia

== Bibliography ==
- Beéche, Arturo E. (2004). The Grand Duchesses. Oakland. ISBN 0-9771961-1-9.
- Jena, Detlef (2003). Katharina Pawlowna. Großfürstin von Russland – Königin von Württemberg (in German). Regensburg: F. Pustet. ISBN 3-7917-1804-5.
- Lincoln, W. Bruce (1981). The Romanovs: Autocrats of All the Russias. London: Weidenfeld and Nicolson. ISBN 0-297-77917-6.

== Sources ==
- Guide 2 Women Leaders

Catherine Pavlovna of Russia House of Holstein-Gottorp-Romanov Cadet branch of the House of Oldenburg Born: 10 May 1788 Died: 9 January 1819
German royalty
| Preceded by Charlotte, Princess Royal | Queen consort of Württemberg; 1816–1819 | Succeeded by Pauline Therese of Württemberg |
