= Princess Louise of Saxe-Hildburghausen =

Princess Louise
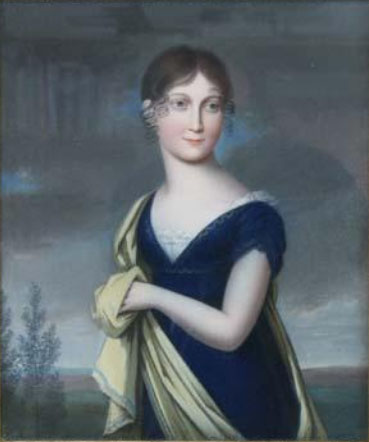
- Portrait c. 1810–20

Princess consort of Nassau-Weilburg
- Tenure: 1816

Duchess consort of Nassau
- Tenure: 1816—1825
- Born: 28 January 1794; Hildburghausen, Saxe-Hildburghausen
- Died: 6 April 1825 (aged 31); Biebrich, Duchy of Nassau
- Spouse: William, Duke of Nassau (m. 1813)
- Issue Detail..: Therese, Duchess of Oldenburg; Adolphe, Grand Duke of Luxembourg; Marie, Princess of Wied
Names
- German: Charlotte Luise Friederike Amalie Alexandrine
- House: Saxe-Hildburghausen
- Father: Frederick, Duke of Saxe-Altenburg
- Mother: Duchess Charlotte Georgine of Mecklenburg-Strelitz

Princess Louise of Saxe-Hildburghausen (Charlotte Luise Friederike Amalie Alexandrine; 28 January 1794 – 6 April 1825) was a member of the House of Saxe-Hildburghausen, and a Princess of Saxe-Hildburghausen by birth. Through her marriage to William, Duke of Nassau, Louise was also a member of the House of Nassau-Weilburg and duchess consort of Nassau. Louise was briefly princess consort of Nassau-Weilburg in 1816.

== Family life and early years ==
Louise was the youngest daughter of Duke Frederick of Saxe-Hildburghausen and his wife, Duchess Charlotte Georgine of Mecklenburg-Strelitz. She thus belonged to the House of Sachsen-Hildburghausen. Louise and her sister Therese were both considered very beautiful, and were the subject of the poem Mit drei Moosrosen, written by Friedrich Rückert.

== Marriage ==
In 1809, Ludwig, Crown Prince of Bavaria, visited Schloss Hildburghausen to choose his bride. Ludwig chose between Louise and Therese, though soon selected Therese. Upon this, Louise was wed with William, Duke of Nassau, eldest son of Frederick William, Prince of Nassau-Weilburg, and his wife, Burgravine Louise Isabelle of Kirchberg.

On 24 June 1813, in Weilburg, the two were married. To honour the occasion of their marriage, the Civil Guard of Weilberg, including Samuel Luja, composed the Cantate am Feste der Heimführung des Erbprinzen Wilhelm von Nassau mit der Prinzessin Louise von Sachsen-Hildburghausen.

The marriage was an unhappy one: Louise's husband was not only autocratic in politics, but he was also rude to his family circle and pestered his wife and children.

=== Death, aftermath and legacy ===
Louise died in 1825 shortly after the birth of her youngest daughter, Marie. Following her death, Louise's husband married her sister Charlotte's daughter Princess Pauline of Württemberg. The Luisenplatz and Luisenstraße in Wiesbaden are named for Louise.

== Issue ==
Louise and William had eight children:

- Auguste Luise Friederike Maximiliane Wilhelmine of Nassau (12 April 1814 – 3 October 1814).
- Therese Wilhelmine Friederike Isabelle Charlotte of Nassau (17 April 1815 – 8 December 1871); married in Biebrich, on 23 April 1837 to Duke Peter of Oldenburg. Their grandson was the tsarist general Grand Duke Nicholas Nikolaevich of Russia the Younger.
- Adolphe, Grand Duke of Luxembourg (24 July 1817 – 17 November 1905). The present Grand Ducal Family of Luxembourg, which became extinct in the male line in 1912, descends from him.
- Wilhelm Karl Heinrich Friedrich of Nassau (8 September 1819 – 22 April 1823).
- Moritz Wilhelm August Karl Heinrich of Nassau (21 November 1820 – 23 March 1850); died unmarried and without issue.
- Princess Marie of Nassau (29 January 1825 – 24 March 1902)

== Ancestry ==
Ancestors of Princess Louise of Saxe-Hildburghausen

8. Ernst Frederick II, Duke of Saxe-Hildburghausen
4. Ernest Frederick III, Duke of Saxe-Hildburghausen
9. Countess Caroline of Erbach-Fürstenau
2. Frederick, Duke of Saxe-Altenburg
10. Ernest Augustus I, Duke of Saxe-Weimar-Eisenach
5. Princess Ernestine of Saxe-Weimar
11. Margravine Sophie Charlotte of Brandenburg-Bayreuth
1. Princess Louise of Saxe-Hildburghausen
12. Duke Charles Louis Frederick of Mecklenburg
6. Charles II, Grand Duke of Mecklenburg
13. Princess Elisabeth Albertine of Saxe-Hildburghausen
3. Duchess Charlotte Georgine of Mecklenburg-Strelitz
14. Prince George William of Hesse-Darmstadt
7. Princess Friederike of Hesse-Darmstadt
15. Countess Maria Louise Albertine of Leiningen-Falkenburg-Dagsburg

== Literature ==
- Heinrich Ferdinand Schoeppl: Die Herzoge von Sachsen-Altenburg. Bozen 1917, Neudruck Altenburg 1992.
- Dr. Rudolf Armin Human: Chronik der Stadt Hildburghausen. Hildburghausen 1886.

Princess Louise of Saxe-Hildburghausen House of Saxe-Hildburghausen Cadet branch of the House of Wettin Born: 28 January 1794 Died: 6 April 1825
German nobility
Preceded by Louise Isabelle of Kirchberg	Princess consort of Nassau-Weilburg; 1816	Succeeded by None (Principality incorporated into the Duchy of Nassau)
Preceded by None (Newly created state)	Duchess consort of Nassau; 9 January 1816–6 April 1825	Succeeded by Pauline of Württemberg
