= Bedřich Pola =

Czech entrepreneur (born 1963)

- Count Pola
- Born: 9 November 1963; Brandýs nad Labem, Czechoslovakia
- Spouse: Ludmila Eliáš
- Issue: Kristina Pola; Martin Pola; Tomáš Pola; Markéta Pola
- Father: Bedřich Jaroslav Josef Antonín Pavel Pola
- Mother: Eliška Marie Třísková

RNDr. Bedřich Pola (9 November 1963) is a Czech entrepreneur, founder of the first private integrated circuit Development Centre in the Czech and Slovak Federative Republic, Knight of Honour and Devotion of the Sovereign Military Order of Malta (SMOM), President of Maltézská pomoc, o.p.s. (the humanitarian organization established by the SMOM's Grand Priory of Bohemia) and the owner of castle Bukovec.

== Life ==
=== Early life, education ===
Born in Brandýs nad Labem on 9 November 1963. He graduated from the Charles University in Prague in Physics. In 1987, he completed postgraduate studies, earning his RNDr. degree in electronics.

=== Family ===
In 1990, he married Ludmila née Eliáš, who is relative to the general Alois Eliáš, who served as Prime Minister of the Protectorate of Bohemia and Moravia from April 27, 1939 to September 28, 1941. Bedřich Pola has 4 children: Kristina (1990), Martin (1992), Tomáš (1993), Markéta (1997). In 2010, he became the owner of castle in Bukovec.

== Career ==
In 1990, he founded the first private integrated circuit Development Centre in the Czech and Slovak Federative Republic ASIX s.r.o. In 2015 he became the President of Maltézská pomoc, o.p.s. (the humanitarian organization established by the SMOM's Grand Priory of Bohemia).

== Honours and awards ==
- SMOM: Knight of Honour and Devotion of the Sovereign Military Order of Malta

== Bibliography ==
- Hübner, Ralph (2013). Who is...? (v České Republice). Nördlingen. ISBN 978-3-7290-0121-3.
