= La Rose, la violette et le papillon =

1857 ballet by Marius Petipa

La Rose, la violette et le papillon (The Rose, the Violet, and the Butterfly) is a ballet divertissement in one act, with choreography by Marius Petipa, music by Duke Peter Georgievich of Oldenburg and libretto by Jules Perrot which premiered as a court performance by the Imperial Ballet on 20 October [O.S. 8 October] 1857, for the Imperial court at the theatre of Tsarskoe Selo, St. Petersburg, Russia. A second premiere was given by the Imperial Ballet on 1 November [O.S. 20 October] 1857. at the Imperial Bolshoi Kamenny Theatre, St. Petersburg, Russia. The Principal Dancers were Mariia Surovshchikova-Petipa (the Rose), Matilda Madaeva (the Violet), and Marfa Muravieva (as the Butterfly).

== Plot outline ==
A rose and a violet have both become enamoured by a gorgeous butterfly who flutters around them, paying court to their sweet embrace. The blossoms attempt to succeed the other with their floral charms, however at the end of these proceedings, the butterfly chooses to fly away rather than exclude one over the other.

=== Trivia ===
- When this ballet was given its second premiere at the St. Petersburg Imperial Bolshoi Kamenny Theatre October 20/November 1, 1857, the choreography was incorrectly credited to the Balletmaster Jules Perrot in the theatre program.
- Music from this ballet was interpolated into Petipa and Perrot's 1858 revival of Le Corsaire, in which it was titled the Pas d'Esclave. The piece has remained a part of the performance tradition of Le Corsaire to the present day.
