= Bukovec (Plzeň-South District) =

- Municipality
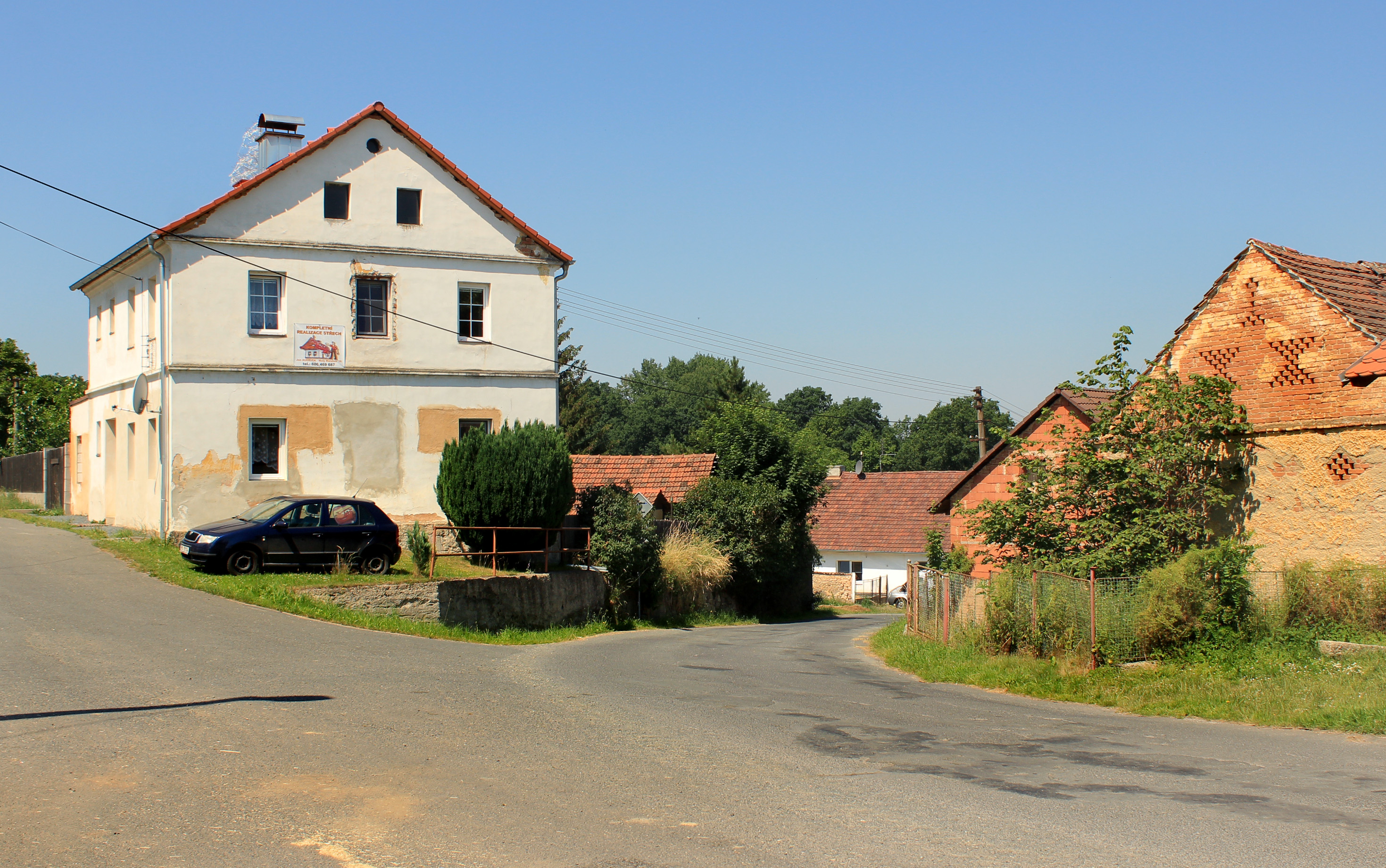
- Main road in Bukovec

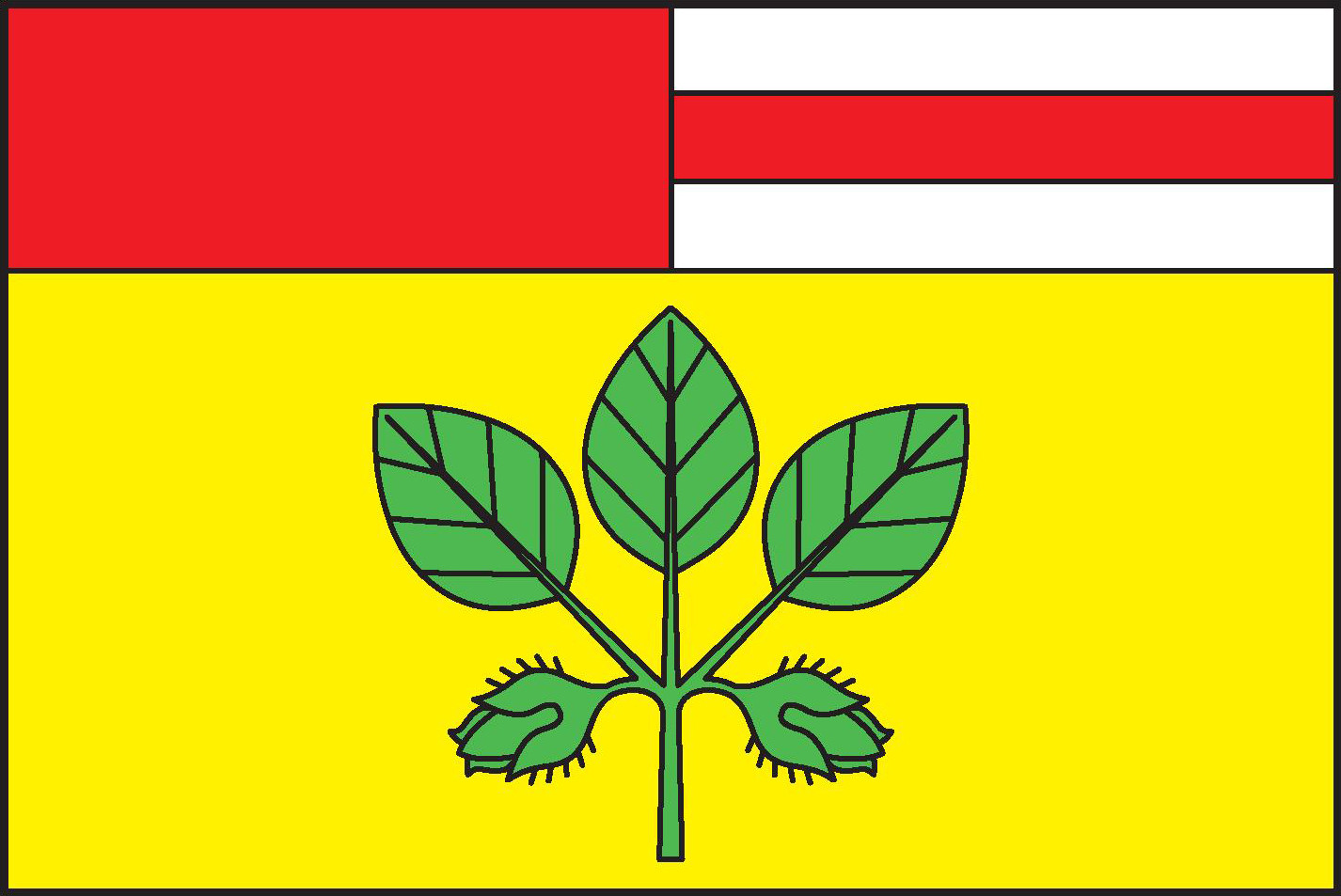
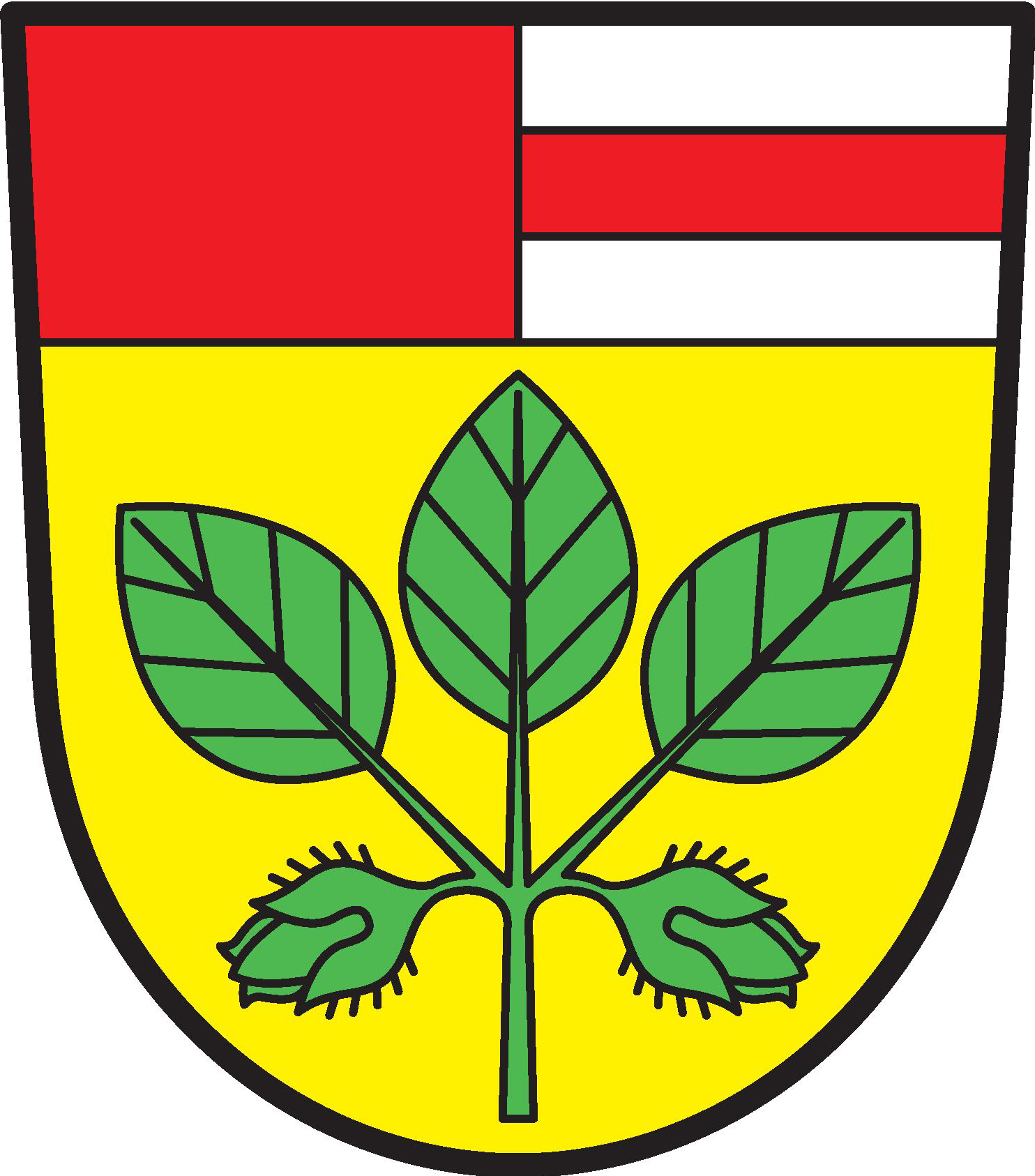
- Flag Coat of arms

- Location in the Czech Republic
- Coordinates: 49°35′11″N 12°59′43″E
- Country: Czech Republic
- Region: Plzeň
- District: Plzeň-South
- First mentioned: 1177

Area
  - Total: 5.83 km^{2} (2.25 sq mi)
- Elevation: 434 m (1,424 ft)

Population (2026-01-01)
  - Total: 129
  - Density: 22.1/km^{2} (57.3/sq mi)
- Time zone: UTC+1 (CET)
  - Summer (DST): UTC+2 (CEST)
- Postal code: 345 62
- Website: www.obecbukovec.cz

Bukovec (Czech pronunciation: [ˈbukovɛts]) is a municipality and village in Plzeň-South District in the Plzeň Region of the Czech Republic. It has about 100 inhabitants.

Bukovec lies approximately 17 kilometres (11 mi) north of Domažlice, 33 km (21 mi) south-west of Plzeň, and 117 km (73 mi) south-west of Prague.

== History ==
The first written mention of Bukovec is from 1177.

From 1 January 2021, Bukovec is no longer a part of Domažlice District and belongs to Plzeň-South District.

== Demographics ==
Historical population
Year	Pop.	±%
1869	190	—
1880	213	+12.1%
1890	214	+0.5%
1900	246	+15.0%
1910	288	+17.1%
1921	314	+9.0%
1930	259	−17.5%
1950	144	−44.4%
1961	175	+21.5%
1970	144	−17.7%
1980	125	−13.2%
1991	94	−24.8%
2001	84	−10.6%
2011	99	+17.9%
2021	120	+21.2%
Source: Censuses
