= Duchess Charlotte Georgine of Mecklenburg-Strelitz =

Charlotte Georgine
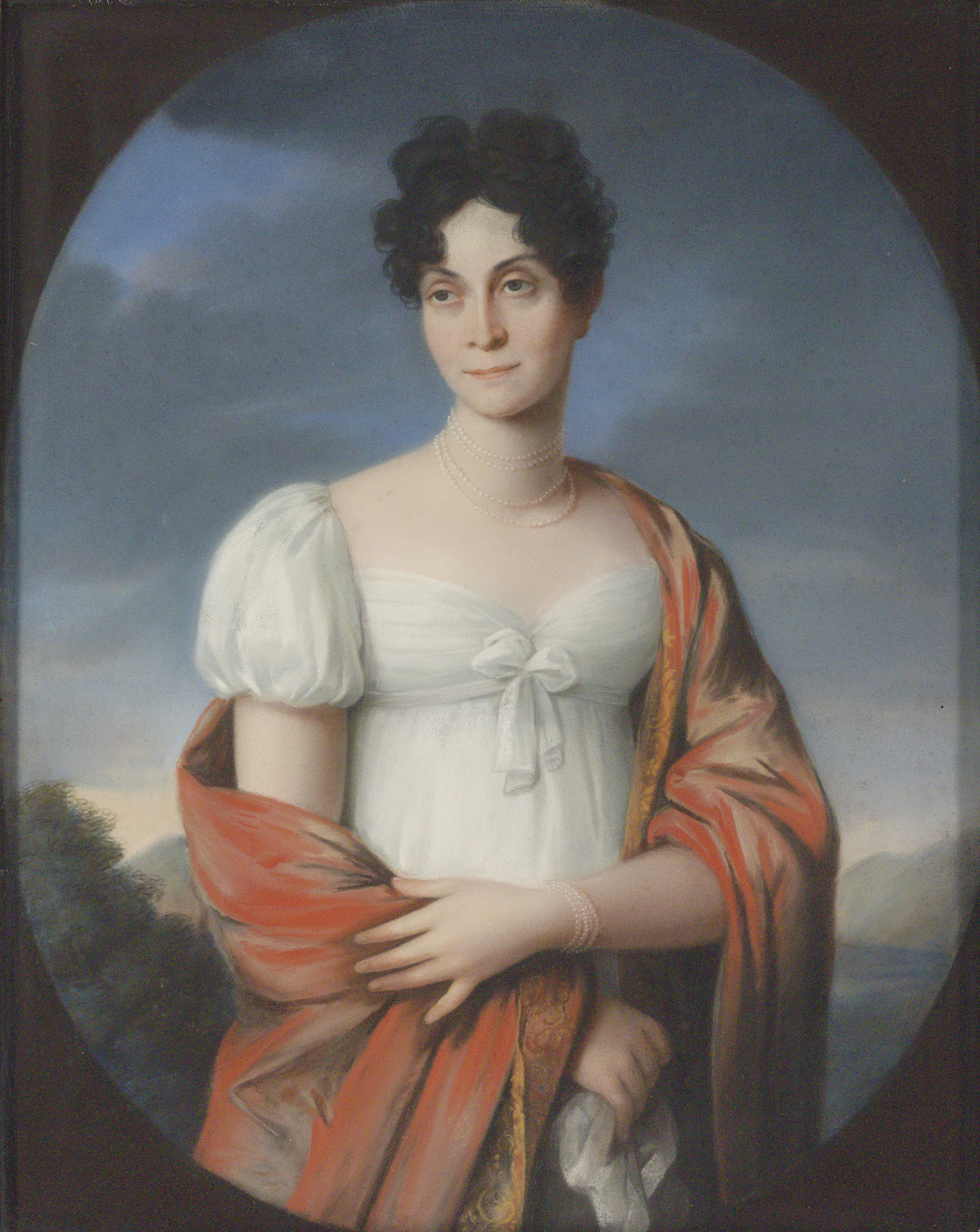
- Portrait by Johann Heinrich Schröder

Duchess consort of Saxe-Hildburghausen
- Tenure: 3 September 1785 – 14 May 1818
- Born: 17 November 1769; Hanover, Electorate of Hanover, Holy Roman Empire
- Died: 14 May 1818 (aged 48); Hildburghausen, Duchy of Saxe-Hildburghausen, German Confederation
- Spouse: Frederick, Duke of Saxe-Hildburghausen (m. 1785)
- Issue among others...: Charlotte, Princess of Württemberg; Joseph, Duke of Saxe-Altenburg; Therese, Queen of Bavaria; Louise, Duchess of Nassau; Georg, Duke of Saxe-Altenburg; Prince Eduard
Names
- German: Charlotte Georgine Luise Friederike
- House: Mecklenburg-Strelitz
- Father: Charles II, Grand Duke of Mecklenburg
- Mother: Princess Friederike of Hesse-Darmstadt

Duchess Charlotte Georgine of Mecklenburg-Strelitz (Charlotte Georgine Luise Friederike; 17 November 1769 – 14 May 1818) was a member of the House of Mecklenburg-Strelitz and a Duchess of Mecklenburg-Strelitz by birth and a Duchess of Saxe-Hildburghausen through her marriage to Frederick, Duke of Saxe-Hildburghausen (later Duke of Saxe-Altenburg).

== Family ==
Charlotte Georgine was born in Hanover, Electorate of Hanover. She was the eldest child and daughter of Charles II, Grand Duke of Mecklenburg and his first wife, Princess Friederike of Hesse-Darmstadt.

Charlotte and her sisters, Queen Louise of Prussia, Queen Frederica of Hanover and Princess Therese of Thurn und Taxis, were considered the most beautiful women of their time. Jean Paul Friedrich Richter dedicated his novel Titan to the "four beautiful and noble sisters on the throne".

== Life ==
=== Childhood and youth ===
Charlotte grew up in Hanover, where her father served as governor, on behalf of his brother-in-law, King George III of the United Kingdom, who lived in London. When Charlotte was twelve years old, her mother died and she was brought up by her mother's sister, Charlotte Wilhelmine, who married her father in 1784, and also by Magdalena of Wolzogen. Her sisters were brought by her grandmother, Countess Maria Louise Albertine of Leiningen-Falkenburg-Dagsburg in Darmstadt. Charlotte had then already moved to Hildburghausen.

=== Duchess of Saxe-Hildburghausen ===
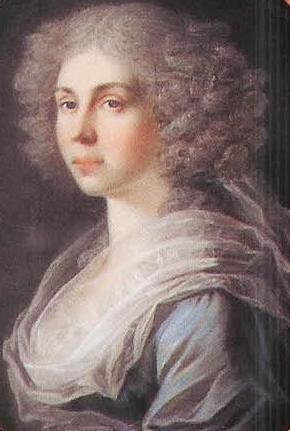
Duchess Charlotte of Saxe-Hildburghausen (1769-1818), pastel by Johann Philipp Bach, ca.1790

On 3 September 1785, at the age of fifteen, Charlotte married Duke Frederick, Duke of Saxe-Altenburg, who stood until 1787 under regency of his great-great uncle Joseph Frederick. The marriage was not a happy one; Charlotte was mentally superior to Frederick, who began to ignore her. They also had financial problems; Saxe-Hildburghausen had been financially ruined by the disastrous policies of Frederick's predecessors and in 1806 it had been put into Imperial receivership. The receivers allowed the Duke and Duchess only a reduced Civil List.

Charlotte's father and two brothers often stayed with Charlotte in Hildburghausen. In 1787, her father moved to Hildburghausen permanently, and became president of the credit committee. In 1792, Charlotte's grandmother and her sisters fled before the advancing French army from Darmstadt to Hildburghausen. Her grandmother noticed of Charlotte's husband .... of all his duties, he only fulfills his marital duties with zeal. Charlotte, who never loved this man, is always pregnant. The family spent several carefree weeks at Hildburghausen. In 1793, Charlotte's grandmother returned from exile and travelled with Charlotte's sisters to Frankfurt am Main, where Louise met her future husband, Frederick William.

Charlotte had a very intimate and loving relationship with her sister Friederike and relatives in Strelitz. In 1803 and 1805, the Prussian royal couple visited Hildburghausen. For this occasion, the receivers allowed the ducal couple to renew some of their furniture. On 9 October 1806, Charlotte and her sister Therese were visiting their sister Louise at the headquarters in Erfurt of king Frederick William III of Prussia, when he declared war on Napoléon Bonaparte. Louise had helped draft the declaration of war.

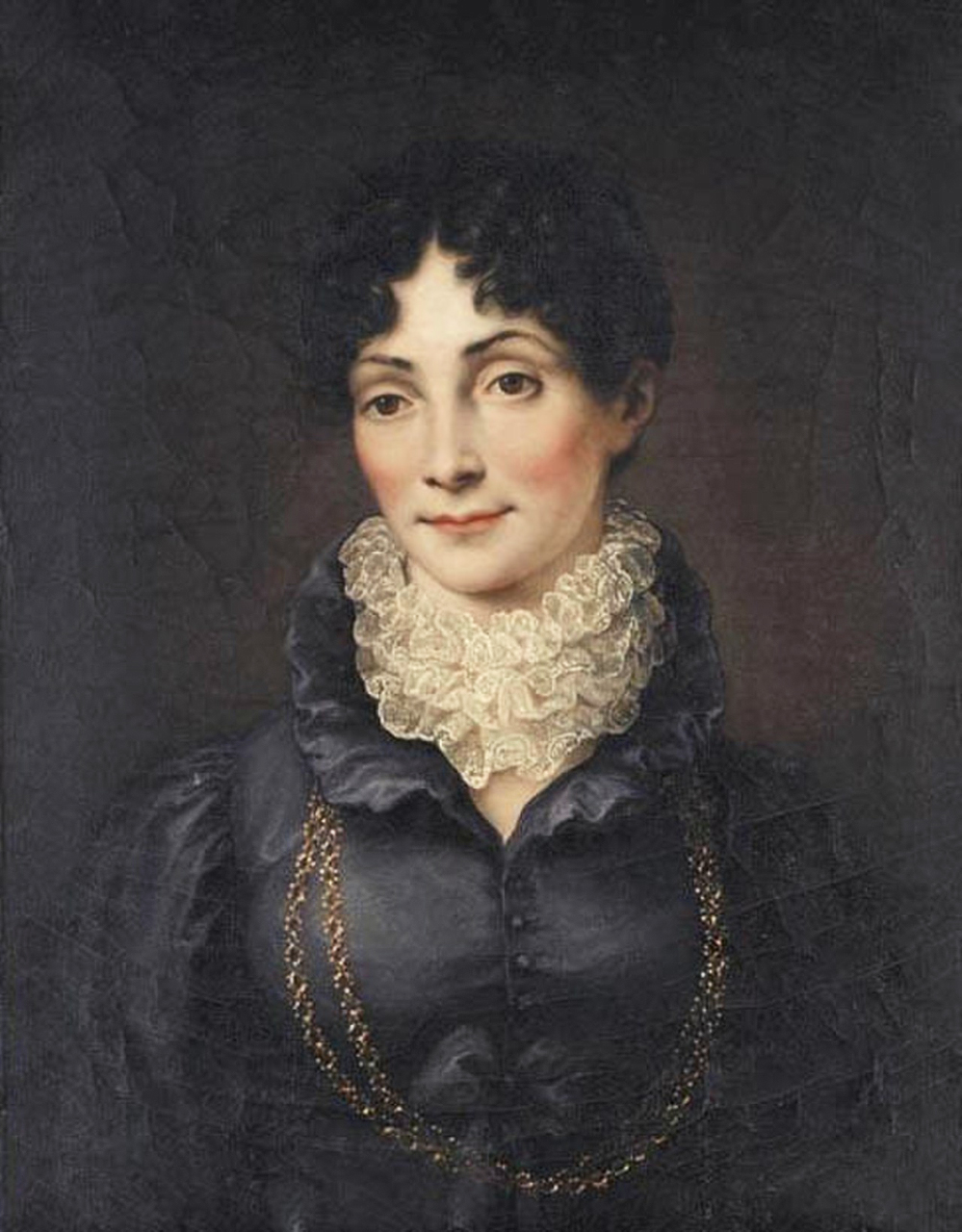
Duchess Charlotte of Saxe-Hildburghausen, painting by Heinrich Vogel, c. 1815

Christian Truchseß von Wetzhausen zu Bettenburg was a friend of the ducal couple and godfather of Charlotte's son Edward. After Charlotte and her daughter Therese, who was Crown Princess of Bavaria at the time, visited his Bettenburg Castle in Franconia, Christian wrote to Fouqué: Our Crown Princess of Bavaria and the Hereditary Princess of Weilburg were visiting their mother, the Duchess of Hildburghausen; and since I have known these lovely daughters since childhood, and they had always been kindly disposed towards me, they felt the urge to visit the old Truchseß on his castle and they and their brother George and the Hereditary Prince of Weilburg, the brave man of Waterloo and really only a small suite came to me on a Sunday afternoon. Many spectators had come to see the Bavarian Crown Princess. When receiving his guests, Truchseß tried to lead the lower-ranking Charlotte first into his castle, but she refused, referring to her daughter. Truchseß replied: Your Highness will forgive me, but as long as this castle has stood here, mothers have always enjoyed precedence before their daughters. Therese then grabbed the baron's other arm, and the three of them walked through the gate together.

The Duchess gave about half of her annual income to the poor, pensioners, and education and apprenticeships for the lower classes. After her sister's death in 1815, she erected the Louise Memorial in the Hildburghausen City Park.

=== Court of the Muse ===
Charlotte was interested in literature and avidly promoted the arts at court. She relaxed the rules and etiquette and brought musicians, painters, and poets to the court, among them the writer Jean Paul Friedrich Richter, who arrived in May 1799. On 25 May 1799, he wrote to his friend Otto: I've been here a week now, and I'm quite weak. For starters, imagine the heavenly Duchess, with beautiful child-like eyes, her face full of love and attraction and youth, a glottis like a nightingale and a mother's heart [...] they love and read me [...]. They ask me in the afternoon and in the evening [...]. Yesterday, I improvised for the court on the grand piano. Besides, there's a decent parish of brothers and sisters here, and I can be Zinzendorf. On 27 October 1799, he again wrote to Otto: I knew ahead of time that the court would stay at their Jagdschloss at Seidingstadt; I went there today. The Duchess was already there when I arrived and saw me within minutes of my arrival. Apart from a lover, I know of nothing more beautiful than her sweet shape.

Charlotte gave the commoner Jean Paul Friedrich Richter the title of a Legation Council and the writer was engaged to one of her ladies in waiting. However, the engagement to Caroline Feuchter von Feuchtersleben was later dissolved.

Under Charlotte, the Court developed to a "little Weimar". The current slogan of the town of Hildburghausen, "Little Classic", refers back to this period. Beside Jean Paul, other contemporaries have also testified to Charlotte's extraordinary singing talent. She was given the nickname "Singlotte" and the reputation of being one of the greatest singers of her day. She was taught singing in Hanover by an Italian named Giuliani and sang in concerts at court and church services. During Holy Week, she regularly sang "Death of Jesus" by Carl Heinrich Graun at Christ Church of Hildburghausen, in which the entire population was allowed into the church.

== Death ==
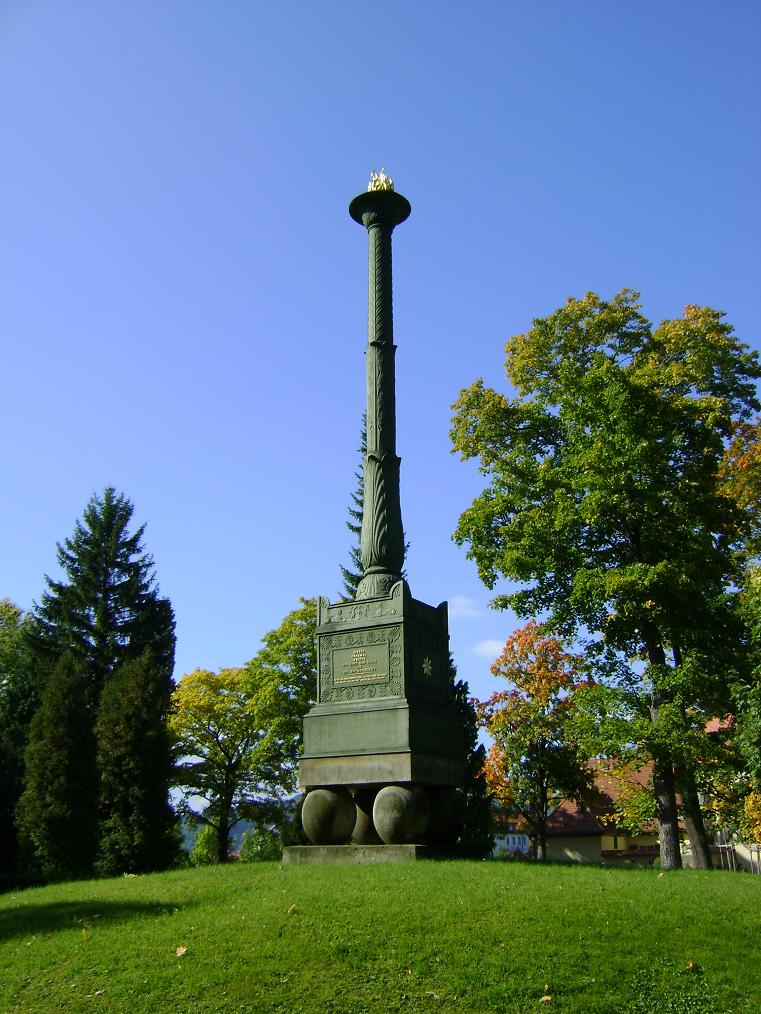
Charlotte candelabra in the cemetery of Hildburghausen

Charlotte died in Hildburghausen, Duchy of Saxe-Hildburghausen, on 14 May 1818 after a long illness. Her daughter Therese reported to her sister Louisa, "Eight or ten days ago, during an anxious night, in which the end seemed near, she said us all a farewell and blessed all you far away loved ones - that's the best a good loving mother can give to her children [...] That night, when she bade us farewell in the most touching manner, I knelt down beside her bed of pain and asked for her blessing. When her hand rested on my head, I spoke for us all, dear mother - and she answered [...]. We all have received a (ring) from her dear hands. Looking at it, my intent to always live a life worthy of my mother, grew ever more steadfast in my heart.

Charlotte decreed that she was to be buried in the newly planned cemetery at Backsteinfeld in Hildburghausen. She was provisionally buried in the church of the castle, and reburied at Backsteinfeld in 1819. Her tomb was designed by Heim, the court carpenter, and was completed in 1824. The green bronzed candelabra stands on four black balls with blazing flames in lead in a shell at the top. The inscription was written by Friedrich Carl Ludwig Sickler. The vault has a height of 4 meters and a diameter of about 12 meters. When the church of the castle was converted into a courtroom, the bodies of all the royals were moved from the royal crypt to Charlotte's tomb.

== Marriage and issue ==
Charlotte married Frederick, Duke of Saxe-Hildburghausen (later Duke of Saxe-Altenburg), youngest child of Ernest Frederick III, Duke of Saxe-Hildburghausen, and his third wife, Princess Ernestine of Saxe-Weimar, on 3 September 1785 in Hildburghausen. They had 12 children:

- Prince Joseph Georg Karl Frederick (Hildburghausen, 12 June 1786 – Hildburghausen, 30 July 1786).
- Princess Katharina Charlotte of Saxe-Hildburghausen (17 June 1787, Hildburghausen – Bamberg, 12 December 1847); married on 28 September 1805 to Prince Paul of Württemberg.
- Princess Caroline Auguste (born and died Hildburghausen, 29 July 1788).
- Joseph Georg Friedrich Ernst Karl, Duke of Saxe-Altenburg (Hildburghausen, 27 August 1789 – Altenburg, 25 November 1868).
- Princess Fredericke Luise Marie Caroline Auguste Christiane (Hildburghausen, 18 January 1791 – Hildburghausen, 25 March 1791).
- Princess Therese Charlotte Luise Friederike Amalie (Hildburghausen, 8 July 1792 – Munich, 26 October 1854); married on 12 October 1810 to King Ludwig I of Bavaria.
- Princess Charlotte Luise Fredericka Amalie Alexandrine (Hildburghausen, 28 January 1794 – Biebrich, 6 April 1825); married on 24 June 1813 to Wilhelm, Duke of Nassau.
- Prince Franz Frederick Karl Ludwig Georg Heinrich (Hildburghausen, 13 April 1795 – Hildburghausen, 28 May 1800).
- Georg, Duke of Saxe-Altenburg (Hildburghausen, 24 July 1796 – Hummelshain, 3 August 1853).
- Prince Frederick Wilhelm Karl Joseph Ludwig Georg (Hildburghausen, 4 October 1801 – Altenburg, 1 July 1870).
- Prince Maximilian Karl Adolf Heinrich (Hildburghausen, 19 February 1803 – Hildburghausen, 29 March 1803).
- Prince Eduard Karl Wilhelm Christian (Hildburghausen, 3 July 1804 – Munich, 16 May 1852).

== Ancestry ==
Ancestors of Duchess Charlotte Georgine of Mecklenburg-Strelitz

8. Adolphus Frederick II, Duke of Mecklenburg-Strelitz
4. Duke Charles Louis Frederick of Mecklenburg
9. Princess Christiane Emilie of Schwarzburg-Sondershausen
2. Charles II, Grand Duke of Mecklenburg-Strelitz
10. Ernest Frederick I, Duke of Saxe-Hildburghausen
5. Princess Elisabeth Albertine of Saxe-Hildburghausen
11. Countess Sophia Albertine of Erbach-Erbach
1. Duchess Charlotte Georgine of Mecklenburg-Strelitz
12. Louis VIII, Landgrave of Hesse-Darmstadt
6. Prince George William of Hesse-Darmstadt
13. Countess Charlotte of Hanau-Lichtenberg
3. Princess Friederike of Hesse-Darmstadt
14. Christian Karl Reinhard of Leiningen-Dagsburg-Falkenburg
7. Countess Maria Louise Albertine of Leiningen-Dagsburg-Falkenburg
15. Countess Catharine Polyxene of Solms-Rödelheim and Assenheim

== Footnotes ==
Duchess Charlotte Georgine of Mecklenburg-Strelitz House of Mecklenburg-Strelitz Cadet branch of the House of Mecklenburg Born: 17 November 1769 Died: 14 May 1818
German royalty
Preceded by Ernestine of Saxe-Weimar	Duchess consort of Saxe-Hildburghausen; 3 September 1785 – 14 May 1818	Succeeded by Amelia of Württemberg as Duchess consort of Saxe-Altenburg
