= Duke Peter of Oldenburg =

German duke

Peter
- Duke of Oldenburg
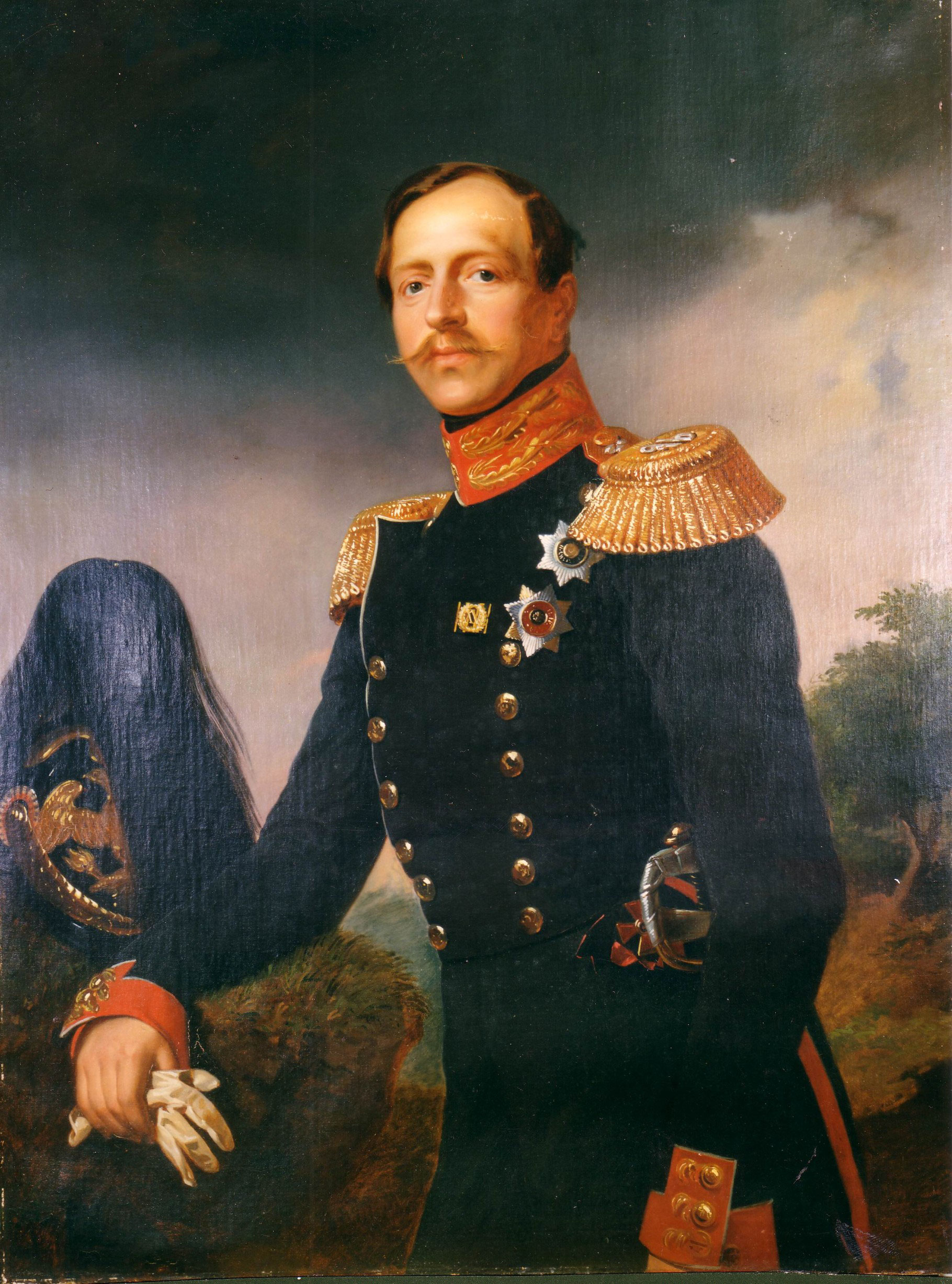
- Born: 26 August [O.S. 14 August] 1812; Yaroslavl, Russia
- Died: 14 May [O.S. 2 May] 1881 (aged 68); Saint Petersburg, Russia
- Burial: Maritime Monastery of St. Sergius
- Spouse: Princess Therese of Nassau-Weilburg (m. 1837; died 1871)
- Issue Detail: Grand Duchess Alexandra Petrovna of Russia; Duke Nicholas; Duchess Cecile; Duke Alexander; Duchess Catherine; Duke George; Duke Constantine; Therese, Princess Therese Petrovna Romanovskaya
- House: Holstein-Gottorp
- Father: Duke George of Oldenburg
- Mother: Grand Duchess Catherine Pavlovna of Russia
- Religion: Lutheranism

Duke Constantine Frederick Peter of Oldenburg (German: Konstantin Friedrich Peter; Russian: Пётр Гео́ргиевич Ольденбу́ргский, romanized: Pëtr Geórgievič Ol'denbúrgskij; 26 August [O.S. 14 August] 1812 – 14 May [O.S. 2 May] 1881) was a relative of the Russian imperial family. Peter was a scholar and philanthropist. He was also noted composer of music. In 1857, he composed the music for Marius Petipa's ballet La Rose, la Violette et le Papillon. The Pas d'Esclave from the ballet Le Corsaire, which is taken from his score for this work, is still heard in theatres all over the world.

== Early life ==
Duke Peter was born on 26 August 1812 in Yaroslavl, Russia. His father, Duke George, who was only the second son of the reigning duke of Oldenburg, had no prospects of inherited his father's state or fortune of his own and was living in Russia since his marriage in 1809 to Grand Duchess Catherine Pavlovna of Russia. Duke George, who had been appointed governor on the Volga, died six months after Peter, his second, was born. Peter's mother Grand Duchess Catherine Pavlovna was the favorite sister of Tsar Alexander I of Russia who took his two nephews, Peter and his older brother, Alexander, under his protection. The brothers lived in Russia until his mother married King William I of Württemberg in 1816. They moved to Württemberg and were educated in Stuttgart. At the death of his mother, less than three years later, Peter and his brother were sent to their grandfather in Oldenburg. Being in direct line of succession to the throne of Oldenburg, as their uncle Hereditary Duke Augustus was unmarried at the time, both boys were given the same extensive education by their grandfather Duke Peter as he had given his own sons and were regularly sent on instructive trips around Germany to broaden their education.

In May 1829, his grandfather died and after the death of his brother Alexander in November of the same year, Peter's maternal uncle, Tsar Nicholas I of Russia sent for Peter, and named him a colonel in the Lifeguards. He quickly rose through the ranks and was subsequently appointed lieutenant general. After four years service he retired, and became active in St. Petersburg government. In 1834 he was made a Russian senator, and it was from that time that his name began to be known as a great philanthropist, devoting his energies primarily to education. He founded the Imperial School of Jurisprudence, at which Russia's future judges and administrators were educated, and in 1844 he was appointed head of an organization to further the education of women.

Peter of Oldenburg was also a scholar, speaking eight languages. As honorary president of the Tsarina Maria Trust, he also played a leading role in overseeing the development of hospitals in Russia, one of which in St Petersburg was called the Prince Peter of Oldenburg Children Hospital. He also made substantial donation to school building programs in Oldenburg, his country of origin.

== Marriage ==
On 23 April 1837 Duke Peter married Therese Wilhelmine Friederikke, Princess of Nassau-Weilburg in Biebrich. This was a happy marriage that lasted for more than thirty years. They had eight children, three of them died early. A daughter Cecilie died in childhood in 1843 and another daughter, Catherine and a son George died from tuberculosis in 1866 and 1871 respectively. Duke Peter and his wife led an exemplary family life, and looked carefully after the education of their children. The family spent the winter months in Peterhof and moved for the summer to their other residence Kamenoi-Ostroff.

== Composer ==
Duke Peter was a talented pianist and composer, and in 1842 he composed his first major piano concerto. In 1844 his second piano concerto was performed for the first time at the Mikhailovsky Palace by the great pianist Clara Schumann, and conducted by his longtime friend and colleague Adolf von Henselt.

As with most Russian nobility, Duke Peter was a longtime balletomane and patron of the arts. In 1857 he was commissioned to compose the score for Marius Petipa's ballet-divertissement La Rose, la Violette et le Papillon, which was given as a performance for the royal court at the Imperial Theatre of Tsarskoe Selo. In 1858 Petipa extracted a Pas de Deux from the Duke's score and added it to his revival of the ballet Le Corsaire, renaming the piece the Pas d'Esclave. It is the only composition of Duke Peter's still heard today in the theater.

Many of Duke Peter's compositions were used as educational tools by the Saint Petersburg Conservatory. The composer and teacher Adolf von Henselt, a close friend of the Duke's, expanded on many of his compositions in order to utilize them for instructional purposes.

== Last years ==
Peter spent fifty years in Russia's service, for which he was widely respected and was thanked by a massive celebration in St Petersburg in 1880 attended by his first cousin Tsar Alexander II of Russia and most of the Imperial family, his cousin Grand Duke Nicholas of Oldenburg and representatives of the many organizations with which the Duke was connected. He was close to Tsar Alexander II and took his assassination in March 1881 very badly and died two months later on 14 May 1881 in St. Petersburg.

== Children ==
Name	Portrait	Birth	Death	Notes
Alexandra		2 June 1838	13 April 1900	Married in 1856 to Grand Duke Nicholas Nikolaevich of Russia; Had issue.
Nicholas		9 May 1840	20 January 1886	Married morganatically in 1863 Maria Bulazel, Countess von Osternburg; Had issue.
Cecile		27 February 1842	11 January 1843	Died in infancy.
Alexander		2 June 1844	6 September 1932	Head of the Russian branch of the House of Oldenburg. Married in 1868 to Princess Eugenia Maximilianovna of Leuchtenberg; Had issue.
Catherine		21 September 1846	23 June 1866	Died unmarried.
George		17 April 1848	17 March 1871	Died unmarried.
Constantin		27 April 1850	18 March 1906	Married morganatically in 1882 to Agrippina Japaridze; Had issue.
Therese		30 March 1852	18 April 1883	Married in 1879 to George Maximilianovich, 6th Duke of Leuchtenberg; Had issue.

== Honours ==
- Russian Empire:
  - Knight of St. Andrew, October 1812
  - Knight of St. Alexander Nevsky, October 1812
  - Knight of St. Anna, 1st Class, October 1812
  - Knight of St. Vladimir, 2nd Class, June 1835; 1st Class, April 1840
  - Knight of the White Eagle, 1865
  - Knight of St. Stanislaus, 1st Class, 1865
- Württemberg: Grand Cross of the Württemberg Crown, 1828
- Saxe-Weimar-Eisenach: Grand Cross of the White Falcon, 17 August 1841
- Oldenburg: Grand Cross of the Order of Duke Peter Friedrich Ludwig, with Golden Crown, 17 January 1839
- Netherlands: Grand Cross of the Netherlands Lion, 1852
- Nassau: Knight of the Gold Lion of Nassau, June 1859
- Grand Duchy of Hesse: Grand Cross of the Ludwig Order, 7 May 1860
- Greece Kingdom of Greece: Grand Cross of the Redeemer, 1862
- Kingdom of Prussia: Knight of the Black Eagle, 7 May 1873
- Austria-Hungary: Grand Cross of St. Stephen, 1874
- (Saxe-Coburg and Gotha) (Duchy of Saxe-Altenburg) (Saxe-Meiningen) Ernestine duchies: Grand Cross of the Saxe-Ernestine House Order, 1877
- Sweden-Norway: Knight of the Seraphim, 21 June 1879

== Ancestry ==
Ancestors of Duke Peter of Oldenburg

8. Prince Georg Ludwig of Holstein-Gottorp
4. Peter I, Duke of Oldenburg
9. Princess Sophie Charlotte of Schleswig-Holstein-Sonderburg-Beck
2. Duke George of Oldenburg
10. Frederick II Eugene, Duke of Württemberg
5. Duchess Frederica of Württemberg
11. Princess Friederike of Brandenburg-Schwedt
1. Duke Peter of Oldenburg
12. Peter III of Russia
6. Paul I of Russia
13. Catherine II of Russia
3. Grand Duchess Catherine Pavlovna of Russia
14. Frederick II Eugene, Duke of Württemberg (= 10)
7. Duchess Sophie Dorothea of Württemberg
15. Princess Friederike of Brandenburg-Schwedt (= 11)

== Bibliography ==
- McIntosh, David, The Russian Oldenburgs, in Royalty History Digest.
- McIntosh, David (2007). The grand dukes of Oldenburg. Rosvall Royal Books. ISBN 91-975671-3-2.
