= Frederick, Duke of Saxe-Altenburg =

Frederick
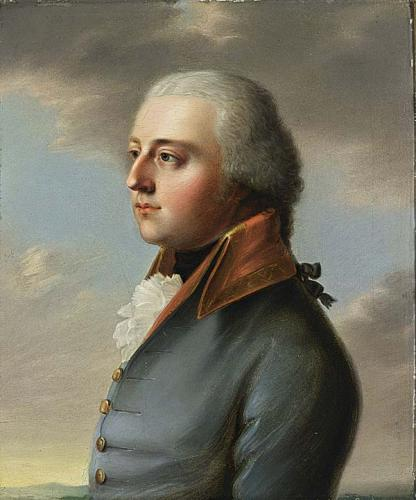
- Portrait, c. 1790

Duke of Saxe-Altenburg
- Reign: 12 November 1826 – 29 September 1834
- Predecessor: New Creation (Saxe-Gotha-Altenburg)
- Successor: Joseph

Duke of Saxe-Hildburghausen
- Reign: 23 September 1780 – 12 November 1826
- Predecessor: Ernest Frederick III
- Successor: Dissolved (swap with Saxe-Meiningen)
- Regent: Prince Joseph
- Born: 29 April 1763; Hildburghausen
- Died: 29 September 1834 (aged 71); Altenburg
- Spouse: Duchess Charlotte Georgine of Mecklenburg-Strelitz (m. 1785; died 1818)
- Issue: Prince Joseph Georg; Catherine Charlotte, Princess Paul of Württemberg; Princess Caroline; Joseph; Princess Fredericke; Therese, Queen of Bavaria; Louise, Duchess of Nassau; Prince Franz Frederick; Georg; Prince Frederick Wilhelm; Prince Maximilian; Prince Eduard
- House: Wettin
- Father: Ernest Frederick III, Duke of Saxe-Hildburghausen
- Mother: Princess Ernestine of Saxe-Weimar
- Religion: Lutheranism

Frederick, Duke of Saxe-Hildburghausen (29 April 1763 in Hildburghausen – 29 September 1834 in Altenburg), was duke of Saxe-Hildburghausen (1780–1826) and duke of Saxe-Altenburg (1826–1834).

== Early life ==
=== Birth and family ===
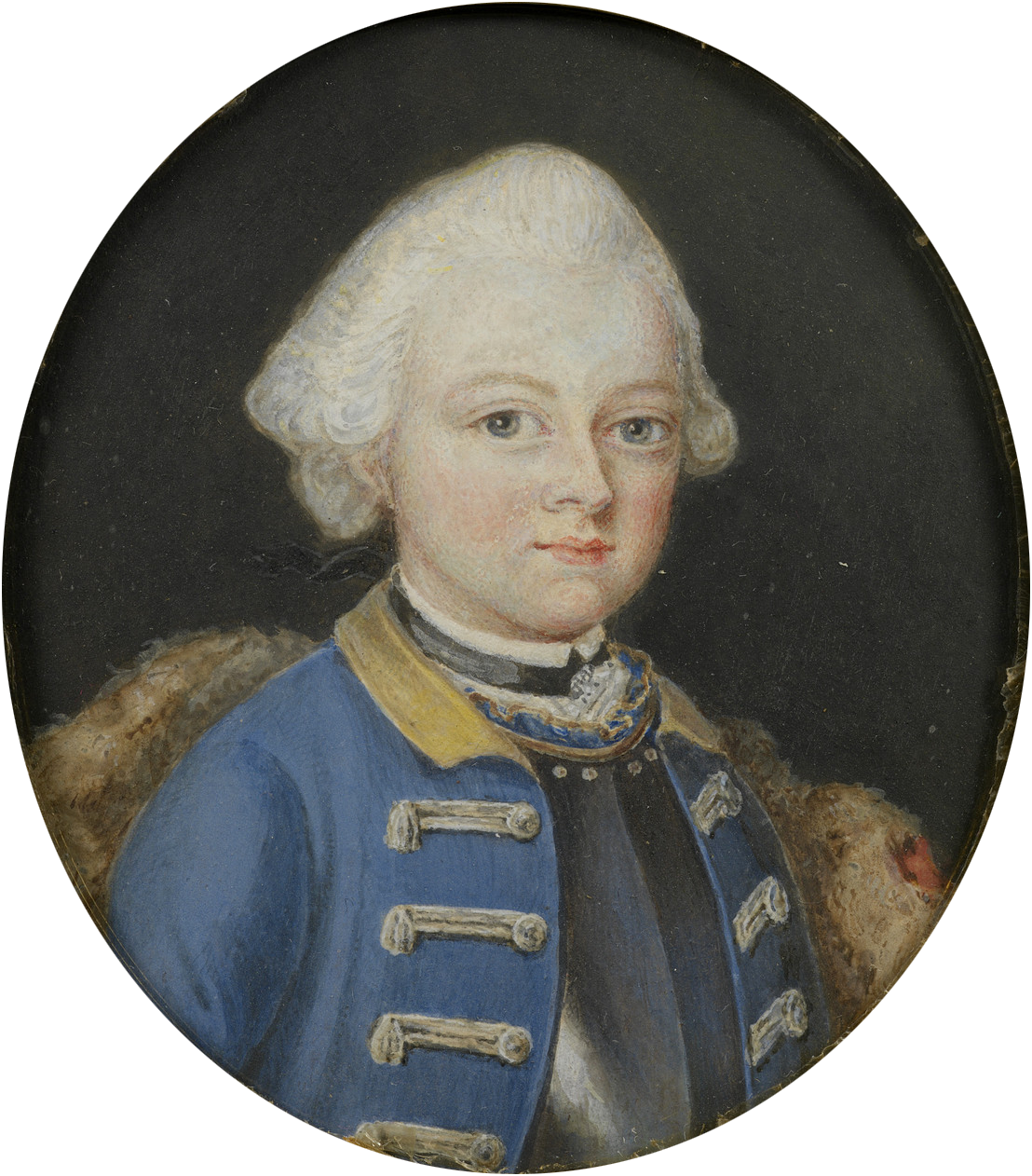
A miniature portrait of the young Prince Frederick, c. 1780.

Prince Frederick was born on 29 April 1763 in Hildburghausen in the Duchy of Saxe-Hildburghausen, one of the small socalled Ernestine duchies in Central Germany governed by dukes of the Ernestine line of the House of Wettin. He was the youngest child, but only son, of Ernst Frederick III, Duke of Saxe-Hildburghausen, by his third wife, Princess Ernestine of Saxe-Weimar. Among his godparents was King Frederick V of Denmark, whose sister, Princess Louise, had been Duke Ernst Frederick III's first wife.

=== Education ===
The prince was initially educated by the city clergyman Johann Ulrich Röder, who sent him to the Gotha court in 1778 for further training under the privy councillors von Lichtenstein and Johann Karl von der Becke. In 1779, Frederick went to Vienna and was introduced to the court there by his great-grand uncle, Prince Joseph of Saxe-Hildburghausen.

=== Regency ===
Frederick succeeded his father as Duke of Saxe-Hildburghausen in 1780, when he was seventeen years old; because of this, his great-grand uncle, Prince Joseph of Saxe-Hildburghausen, assumed the regency on his behalf. His great-grand-uncle had a significant influence on him, and through his mediation, he married Charlotte Georgine of Mecklenburg-Strelitz.

== Reign ==
=== Duke of Saxe-Hildburghausen ===
Prince Joseph died on 4 January 1787, after which Frederick assumed full authority. One of his first official acts was the establishment of a customs union between himself, George I, Duke of Saxe-Meiningen, and Francis, Duke of Saxe-Coburg-Saalfeld, as agreed at the Rodach Conference. This union enabled free trade between the two states. This was followed by reforms in guilds, welfare, and the police, road construction, and medicine. He improved the school system and, in 1795, founded a teachers' college in Hildburghausen under Ludwig Nonne, followed by a gymnasium illustre and an industrial school for the poor in 1812.

After Prussia and Austria declared war on France in 1791, Frederick provided a contingent of troops that occupied the Ehrenbreitstein Fortress. Until 1806 he was subject to the restrictions of the imperial debit commission, which had placed the duchy of Saxe-Hildburghausen under official administration, because of his predecessors' dissolute financial policy.

In 1806, Frederick joined the Confederation of the Rhine, and in 1815, the German Confederation. In 1818, he, in collaboration with Karl Ernst Schmid, gave the duchy a new constitution. The improved financial situation enabled the purchase of the Eishausen manor.

Frederick was considered popular and intelligent. During his reign, along with his wife, Charlotte, cultural life in the small town reached its zenith. So many poets and artists spent their time there that Hildburghausen was nicknamed "Klein-Weimar" (Little Weimar). When the last duke of Saxe-Gotha-Altenburg died without issue in 1825, the other branches of the house decided on a rearrangement of the Ernestine duchies, and as agreed in the Preliminary Treaty of Liebenstein on 11 August 1826, Frederick left the Duchy of Saxe-Hildburghausen on 17 November 1826. The Duchy fell to Saxe-Meiningen and Saxe-Coburg-Saalfeld, and from then on he ruled the re-established Duchy of Saxe-Altenburg as Frederick I, with the exception of the district of Camburg.

=== Duke of Saxe-Altenburg ===
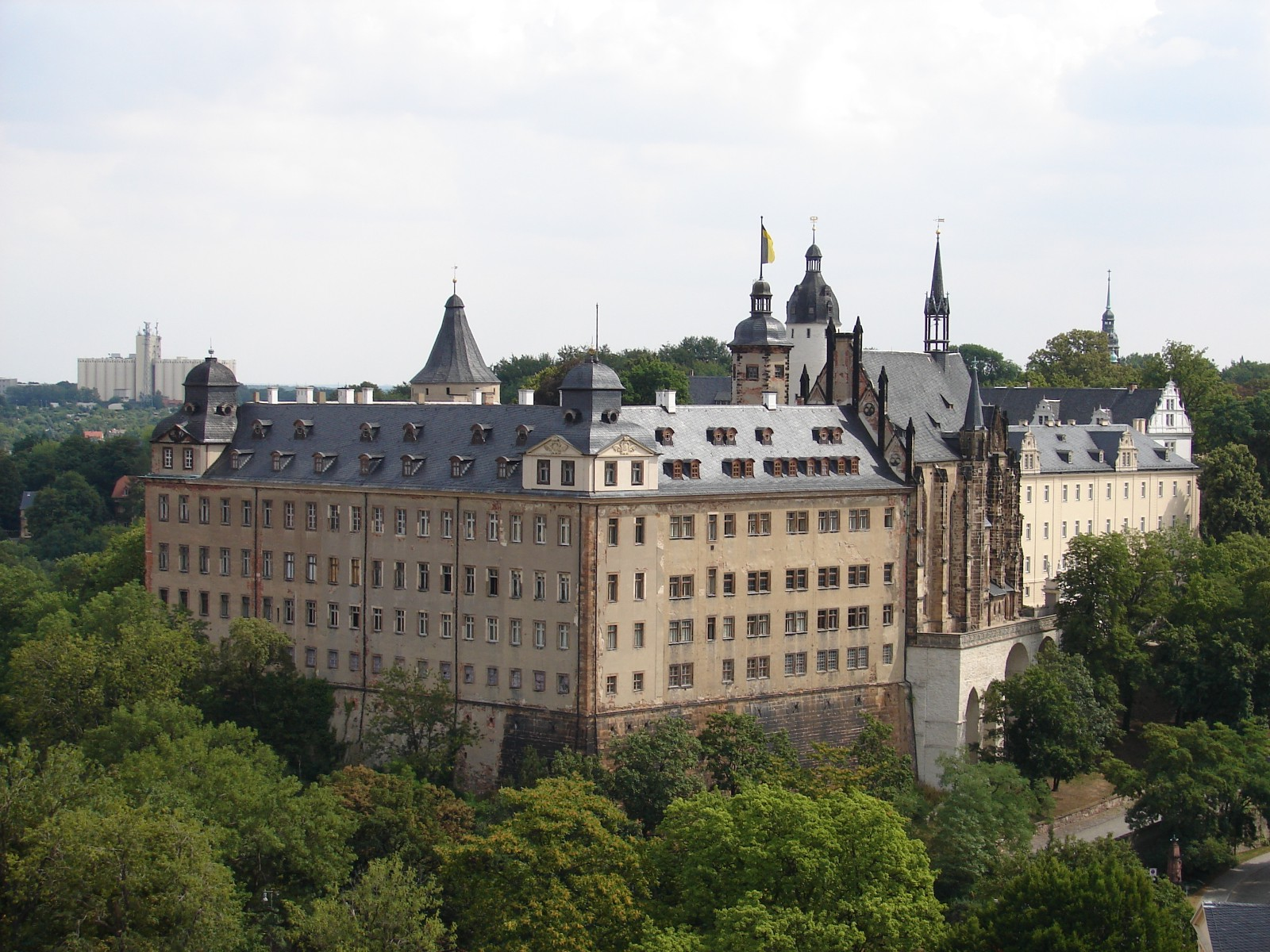
Altenburg Castle

When Frederick moved to Altenburg on 23 November 1826, the resident was in less than perfect condition. He often stayed at Hummelshain Castle while Altenburg Castle underwent restoration.

On 14 September 1830, following street fighting in the ducal capital, Frederick granted the duchy its first constitution from the town hall of Altenburg. The constitution officially came into force on 23 April 1831. Throughout his reign, the Duke expanded the country's infrastructure, abolished the hunting levy, and improved the administration. He joined the German Customs and Trade Union in 1833.

== Death and succession ==
Frederick died on 29 September 1834 at the Hummelshain Hunting Lodge in Hummelshain at the age of 71. He was succeeded by his son Joseph.

== Marriage and issue ==
In Hildburghausen on 3 September 1785, Frederick married Duchess Charlotte Georgine of Mecklenburg-Strelitz. She was a niece of Charlotte of Mecklenburg-Strelitz, who was the wife of King George III. Two of her sisters later became the queens of Prussia and Hanover, respectively. They had twelve children:

1. Joseph Georg Karl Frederick (b. Hildburghausen, 12 June 1786 – d. Hildburghausen, 30 July 1786) died in infancy.
2. Katharina Charlotte Georgine Fredericka Sofie Therese (b. Hildburghausen, 17 June 1787 – d. Bamberg, 12 December 1847), married on 28 September 1805 to Prince Paul of Württemberg.
3. Caroline Auguste (b. and d. Hildburghausen, 29 July 1788) died at birth.
4. Joseph Georg Friedrich Ernst Karl, Duke of Saxe-Altenburg (b. Hildburghausen, 27 August 1789 – d. Altenburg, 25 November 1868).
5. Fredericke Luise Marie Caroline Auguste Christiane (b. Hildburghausen, 18 January 1791 – d. Hildburghausen, 25 March 1791) died in infancy.
6. Therese Charlotte Luise Friederike Amalie (b. Hildburghausen, 8 July 1792 – d. Munich, 26 October 1854), married on 12 October 1810 to King Ludwig I of Bavaria.
7. Charlotte Luise Fredericka Amalie Alexandrine (b. Hildburghausen, 28 January 1794 – d. Biebrich, 6 April 1825), married on 24 June 1813 to Wilhelm, Duke of Nassau.
8. Franz Frederick Karl Ludwig Georg Heinrich (b. Hildburghausen, 13 April 1795 – d. Hildburghausen, 28 May 1800) died in childhood.
9. Georg, Duke of Saxe-Altenburg (b. Hildburghausen, 24 July 1796 – d. Hummelshain, 3 August 1853).
10. Frederick Wilhelm Karl Joseph Ludwig Georg (b. Hildburghausen, 4 October 1801 – d. Altenburg, 1 July 1870) died unmarried without issue.
11. Maximilian Karl Adolf Heinrich (b. Hildburghausen, 19 February 1803 – d. Hildburghausen, 29 March 1803) died in infancy.
12. Eduard Karl Wilhelm Christian (b. Hildburghausen, 3 July 1804 – d. Munich, 16 May 1852).

== Ancestry ==
Ancestors of Frederick, Duke of Saxe-Altenburg

8. Ernest Frederick I, Duke of Saxe-Hildburghausen
4. Ernest Frederick II, Duke of Saxe-Hildburghausen
9. Countess Sophia Albertine of Erbach-Erbach
2. Ernest Frederick III, Duke of Saxe-Hildburghausen
10. Philipp Charles, Count of Erbach-Fürstenau
5. Countess Caroline of Erbach-Fürstenau
11. Countess Charlotte Amalie of Kunowitz
1. Frederick, Duke of Saxe-Altenburg
12. Johann Ernst III, Duke of Saxe-Weimar
6. Ernest Augustus I, Duke of Saxe-Weimar-Eisenach
13. Princess Sophie Auguste of Anhalt-Zerbst
3. Princess Ernestine of Saxe-Weimar
14. George Frederick Charles, Margrave of Brandenburg-Bayreuth
7. Princess Sophie Charlotte of Brandenburg-Bayreuth
15. Princess Dorothea of Schleswig-Holstein-Sonderburg-Beck

== Citations ==
=== Bibliography ===
- August Beck (1878). "Friedrich I. (Herzog von Sachsen-Hildburghausen)" . Allgemeine Deutsche Biographie (in German). Vol. 8. Leipzig: Duncker & Humblot. pp. 1–2.
- Human, Rudolf Armin (1886). Chronik der Stadt Hildburghausen (in German). Hildburghausen: Kesselringsche Hofbuchhandlung.
- Schoeppl, Heinrich Ferdinand (1917). Die Herzoge von Sachsen-Altenburg ehem. von Hildburghausen. Reprint: Altenburg 1992 (in German). Bozen: Tyrolia. ISBN 978-3368259396.

Frederick, Duke of Saxe-Altenburg House of Wettin Born: 29 April 1763 Died: 29 September 1834
Preceded by Ernst Frederick III	Duke of Saxe-Hildburghausen; 1780–1826	became Duke of Saxe-Altenburg
Preceded by Frederick IV as Duke of Saxe-Gotha-Altenburg	Duke of Saxe-Altenburg; 1826–1834	Succeeded by Joseph
