= Princess Sophie of Saxe-Hildburghausen =

Princess Sophie
- Hereditary Princess of Saxe-Coburg-Saalfeld
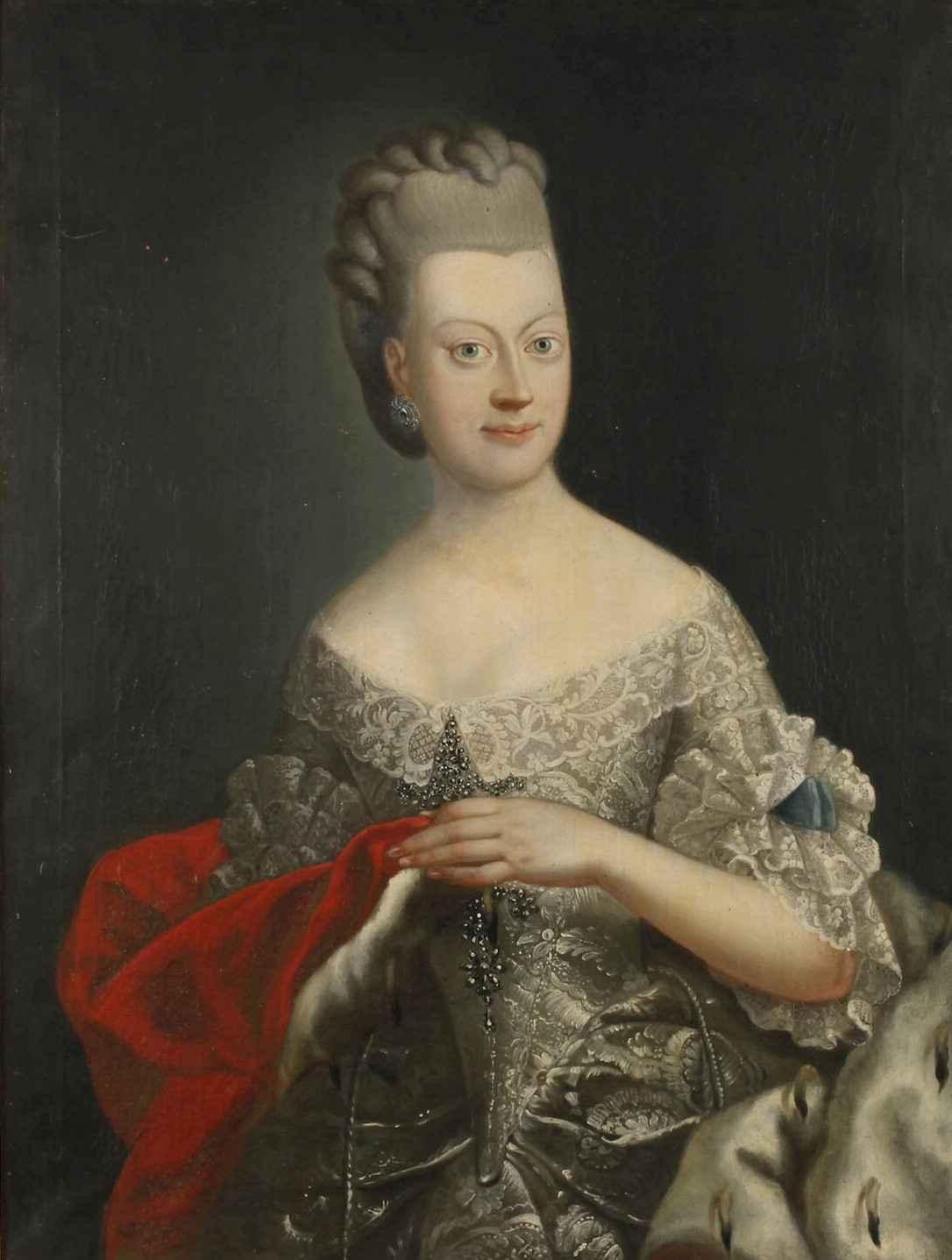
- Portrait, 1770s
- Born: 22 February 1760; Hildburghausen
- Died: 28 October 1776 (aged 16); Coburg
- Burial: Crypt of St. Moritz Church, Coburg
- Spouse: Francis, Hereditary Prince of Saxe-Coburg-Saalfeld (m. 1776)
Names
- Ernestine Friederike Sophie
- House: Wettin
- Father: Ernest Frederick III, Duke of Saxe-Hildburghausen
- Mother: Princess Ernestine of Saxe-Weimar
- Religion: Lutheranism

Princess Sophie of Saxe-Hildburghausen (Ernestine Friederike Sophie; 22 February 1760, Hildburghausen – 28 October 1776, Coburg), was a Princess of Saxe-Hildburghausen by birth, and by marriage she became the Hereditary Duchess of Saxe-Coburg-Saalfeld.

== Early life and ancestry ==
Sophie was born on 22 February 1760, into the Ernestine branch of the House of Wettin. She was the daughter of Duke Ernest Frederick III of Saxe-Hildburghausen (1727–1780) and Princess Ernestine of Saxe-Weimar (1740–1786).

Her godparents were:

- the Danish royal couple: Frederick V of Denmark and Juliana Maria of Brunswick-Wolfenbüttel
- the King of Poland: Augustus III of Poland
- the Duke of Saxe-Coburg: Francis Josias, Duke of Saxe-Coburg-Saalfeld
- the regent of Duchy of Saxe-Weimar: Duchess Anna Amalia of Brunswick-Wolfenbüttel,
- the Duke of Mecklenburg-Schwerin: Frederick II, Duke of Mecklenburg-Schwerin
- the Duke of Württemberg: Charles Eugene, Duke of Württemberg

== Marriage ==
On 6 March 1776, Sophie married at the age of 16 (in Hildburghausen) the Hereditary Duke (and later Duke) Francis Frederick Anthony of Saxe-Coburg-Saalfeld.

At the time, Francis had already fallen in love with his future wife Countess Augusta Reuss of Ebersdorf, but he was unable to break off his previous engagement with Sophie.

== Death ==
Sophie died of influenza just seven months later, on 28 October 1776, aged only 16. Her marriage to Francis remained childless. Hereditary Princess Sophie was buried in the crypt of the St. Moritz Church in Coburg, Germany.

== Ancestry ==
Ancestors of Princess Sophie of Saxe-Hildburghausen

8. Ernest Frederick I, Duke of Saxe-Hildburghausen
4. Ernest Frederick II, Duke of Saxe-Hildburghausen
9. Countess Sophia Albertine of Erbach-Erbach
2. Ernest Frederick III, Duke of Saxe-Hildburghausen
10.Philipp Charles, Count of Erbach-Fürstenau
5. Caroline of Erbach-Fürstenau
11.Countess Charlotte Amalie von Kunowitz
1. Princess Sophie of Saxe-Hildburghausen
12.Johann Ernst III, Duke of Saxe-Weimar
6. Ernest August I, Duke of Saxe-Weimar
13. Princess Sophie Auguste of Anhalt-Zerbst
3. Princess Ernestine of Saxe-Weimar
14.George Frederick Charles, Margrave of Brandenburg-Bayreuth
7. Margravine Sophie Charlotte of Brandenburg-Bayreuth
15.Princess Dorothea of Schelswig-Holstein-Sonderburg-Beck
