= Ernest Frederick =

Ernest Frederick may refer to:

- Ernest Frederick, Margrave of Baden-Durlach (1560–1604)
- Ernest Frederick I, Duke of Saxe-Hildburghausen (1681–1724)
- Ernest Frederick II, Duke of Saxe-Hildburghausen (1707–1745)
- Ernest Frederick, Duke of Saxe-Coburg-Saalfeld (1724–1800)
- Ernest Frederick III, Duke of Saxe-Hildburghausen (1727–1780)
- Ernest Frederick, Count Munster or Ernst zu Münster (1766–1839)
