= Louis II Frederick Charles Eginhard, Count of Erbach-Fürstenau =

Count of Erbach and Fürstenau

Louis II Frederick Charles Eginhard, Count of Erbach-Fürstenau (12 May 1728 – 16 January 1794), was a member of the German House of Erbach who held the fiefs of Fürstenau, Michelstadt and Breuberg.

Born in Fürstenau, he was the fourth child and second (but eldest surviving) son of Philipp Charles, Count of Erbach-Fürstenau and his second wife Anna Sophie, a daughter of Kaspar, Baron of Spesshardt in Unsleben and Mupparg.

== Life ==
A minor at the time of his father's death in 1736, Louis II and his younger brother George Albert III remained under the guardianship of their older half-brother Johann William until his death in 1742, when Louis II (aged 14) assumed the government jointly with his brother until 1747 when they divided their lands: Louis II received the districts of Freienstein, Michelstadt, Bullau and Stockheim.

On 4 February 1784 Louis II married morganatically with Christine Sophie Küchler, his long-time mistress, who assumed the title of Frau von Treuberg. They had three sons, two of them was born before his parents' marriage:

- Frederick [created Freiherr von Treuberg in Munich 15 June 1824] (3 January 1775 – 30 December 1831), a Bavarian general-lieutenant; he married twice and issue (line extinct in 1868).
- Eginhard [created Freiherr von Treuberg in Munich 15 June 1824] (16 July 1780 – 25 October 1827), a Bavarian colonel; married and had issue (line extinct in 1965).
- Franz Carl [created Freiherr von Treuberg in Munich 15 June 1824] born in Heidelberg in 1784, died in Wels, 1 May 1839.

Louis II died in Heidelberg aged 65 and was buried in the Providenzkirche. Because he died without legitimate issue, all his domains passed to the heirs of his brother George Albert III.
