= George Albert III of Erbach-Fürstenau =

George Albert III, Count of Erbach-Fürstenau (14 June 1731 – 2 May 1778), was a member of the German House of Erbach who held the fiefs of Fürstenau, Michelstadt and Breuberg.

Born in Fürstenau, he was the sixth child and third (but second surviving) son of Philipp Charles, Count of Erbach-Fürstenau and his second wife Anna Sophie, a daughter of Kaspar, Baron of Spesshardt in Unsleben and Mupparg.

== Life ==
A minor at the time of his father's death in 1736, George Albert III and his older brother Louis II remained under the guardianship of their older half-brother Johann William until his death in 1742, when Louis II (aged 14) and George Albert III (aged 11) assumed the government jointly until 1747 when they divided their lands: George Albert III received the districts of Fürstenau, Michelstadt and Breuberg.

George Albert III died in Fürstenau aged 46 and was buried in Michelstadt.

== Marriage and issue ==
In Neustadt an der Orla on 3 August 1752 George Albert III married with Josepha Eberhardine Adolphine Wilhelmine (2 March 1737 – 27 July 1788), a daughter of Christian, Prince of Schwarzburg-Sondershausen-Neustadt and his wife Sophie Christine Eberhardine of Anhalt-Bernburg-Schaumburg-Hoym. They had five children:

- Frederick Augustus, Count of Erbach-Fürstenau (5 May 1754 – 12 March 1784).
- Christian Charles Augustus Albert, Count of Erbach-Fürstenau (18 September 1757 – 10 May 1803); he had a son who was the father of (among others) Emma and Adelheid, who both married sons of Henry of Stolberg-Wernigerode.
- George (28 July 1762 – 3 August 1762).
- George Eginhard (23 January 1764 – 11 September 1801).
- Louis (17 April 1765 – 22 September 1775).
