= Amalie of Saxe-Hildburghausen =

- Born: 21 July 1732; Hildburghausen
- Died: 19 June 1799 (aged 66); Öhringen
- Noble family: House of Wettin
- Spouse: Prince Louis of Hohenlohe-Neuenstein-Oehringen (m. 1749)
- Issue: Charles Louis Frederick
- Father: Ernest Frederick II, Duke of Saxe-Hildburghausen
- Mother: Countess Caroline of Erbach-Fürstenau

Sophie Amalie Caroline of Saxe-Hildburghausen (German: Sophie Amalie Karoline von Sachsen-Hildburghausen; born: 21 July 1732 in Hildburghausen; died: 19 June 1799 in Öhringen), was a princess of Saxe-Hildburghausen and by marriage Princess of Hohenlohe-Neuenstein-Oehringen.

== Life ==
Amalie was the youngest child and only daughter of the Duke Ernest Frederick II of Saxe-Hildburghausen from his marriage to Caroline Amalie, a daughter of Count Philipp Charles of Erbach-Fürstenau.

She married on 28 January 1749 in Hildburghausen with Prince Louis of Hohenlohe-Neuenstein-Oehringen (23 May 1723 – 27 July 1805). They had one son, Charles Louis Frederick (20 April 1754 – 28 February 1755).

Because they did not have surviving male issue, after Louis' death his lands fell to Hohenlohe-Ingelfingen.

In 1770 Amalie invited her disgraced brother Eugene -and later his wife when they married in 1778- to live at the court in Öhringen, where they both lived until their deaths (in 1795 and 1790, respectively).

She was buried with her husband in a special resting place of the Collegiate Church in Öhringen. Here, in the southern transept, a marble relief of Caroline and her husband was created in a neo-classicist style by the sculptor Johann Gottfried Schadow on the occasion of the golden wedding of the couple in 1799.

== References and sources ==
- Beschreibung des Oberamts Oehringen, H. Lindemann, Stuttgart, 1865, p. 111 (Digitized)
- Heinrich Ferdinand Schoeppl: Die Herzoge von Sachsen-Altenburg, Bozen, 1917, reprinted Altenburg, 1992
