= Princess Ernestine of Saxe-Weimar-Eisenach =

Princess Ernestine
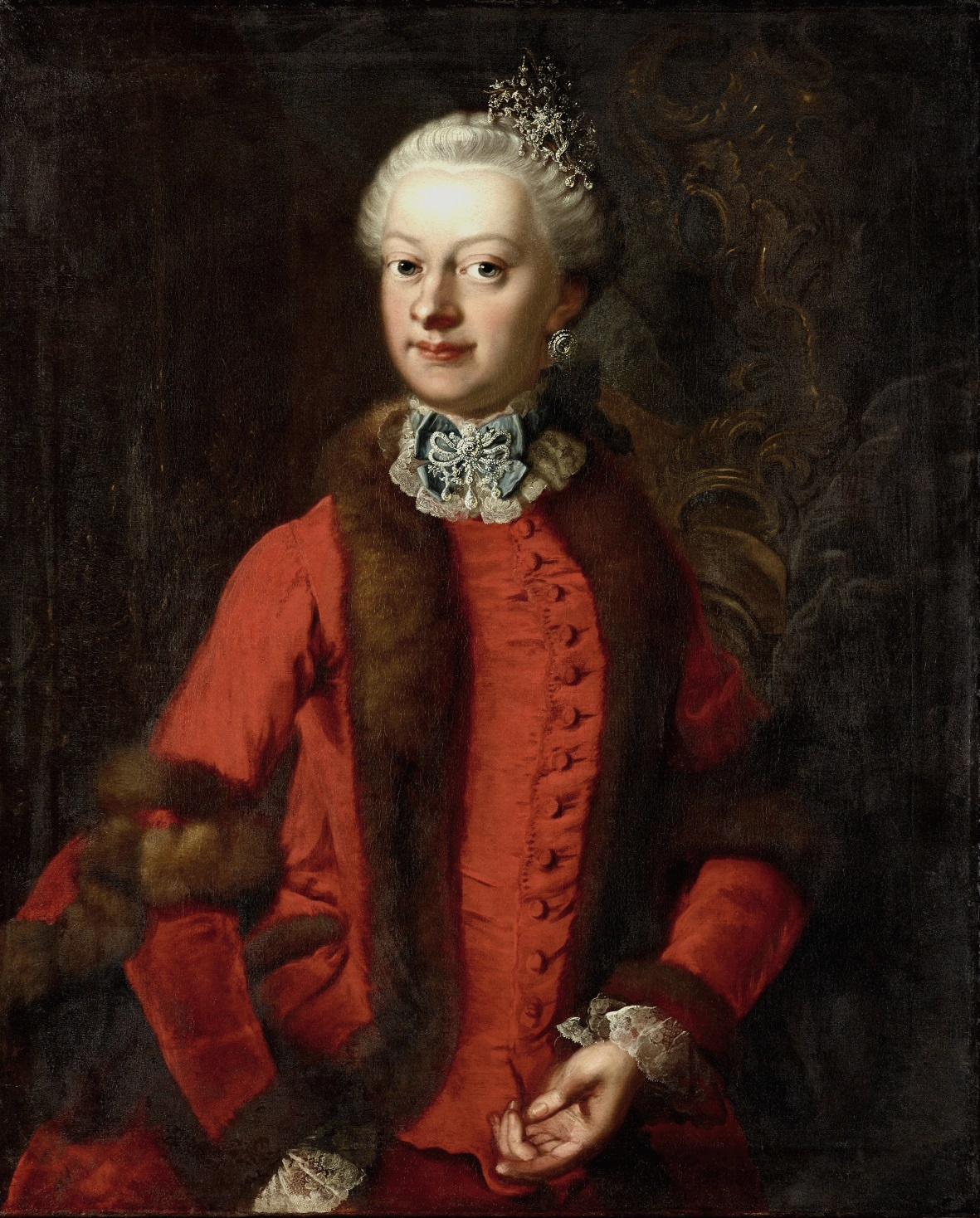

Duchess consort of Saxe-Hildburghausen
- Tenure: 1 July 1758 – 23 September 1780
- Born: 4 January 1740; Weimar
- Died: 10 June 1786 (aged 46); Hildburghausen
- Spouse: Ernest Frederick III, Duke of Saxe-Hildburghausen (m. 1758; died 1780)
- Issue: Sophie, Hereditary Princess of Saxe-Coburg-Saalfeld; Princess Caroline of Saxe-Hildburghausen; Frederick, Duke of Saxe-Altenburg
Names
- Ernestine Auguste Sophie
- House: Wettin
- Father: Ernest Augustus I, Duke of Saxe-Weimar-Eisenach
- Mother: Margravine Sophie Charlotte of Brandenburg-Bayreuth
- Religion: Lutheranism

Princess Ernestine Auguste Sophie of Saxe-Weimar-Eisenach (4 January 1740, in Weimar – 10 June 1786, in Hildburghausen) was a princess of Saxe-Weimar-Eisenach and by marriage Duchess of Saxe-Hildburghausen.

== Life ==
Ernestine Auguste Sophie was a daughter of the Duke Ernest August I of Saxe-Weimar-Eisenach and his second wife, Margravine Sophie Charlotte of Brandenburg-Bayreuth, daughter of George Frederick Charles, Margrave of Brandenburg-Bayreuth.

On 1 July 1758, she married Ernest Frederick III, Duke of Saxe-Hildburghausen in Bayreuth. The marriage was arranged at the behest of her aunt the Queen Sophie Magdalene of Denmark. She had been the groom's mother in law during his earlier marriage. Ernest Frederick Charles was heavily indebted and the dowry Ernestine brought in was significant.

Carl Barth describes the Duchess as follows:

apart from a fine half-squint of one eye, she was a beautiful, well-built lady who occupied herself passionately with music (French horn, flute, piano, and violin!). She fought, rode, and hunted on horseback and on foot like a man, usually dressed in the full Amazon costume with tightly fitting deerskin trousers, sitting on horseback in Amazon style. She personally led the knightly exercises of the Crown Prince.

Christian Friedrich von Stocmeier was appointed steward. His policies improved the country's tight financial situation, but he could not prevent a national bankruptcy. In 1769 the country was placed under imperial sequestration and a debit commission attempted to consolidate the financial situation.

After the death of her husband in 1780, she retired completely. She lived in the so-called Fischbergsche House on the market of Hildburghausen and devoted herself mainly to music.

Prince Joseph of Saxe-Hildburghausen exercised guardianship of her son Frederick, who was still a minor.

== Issue ==
- Ernestine Friederike Sophie (1760–1776), married in 1776 Duke Francis Frederick Anton, duke of Saxe-Coburg (1750–1806)
- Christine Sophie Karoline (1761–1790), married in 1778 Prince Eugene of Saxe-Hildburghausen (1730–1795)
- Frederick (1763–1834), Duke of Saxe-Hildburghausen and after 1826 also Duke of Saxe-Altenburg, married in 1785 Charlotte Georgine Louise of Mecklenburg-Strelitz (1769–1818)

== Ancestry ==
Ancestors of Princess Ernestine of Saxe-Weimar-Eisenach

8. John Ernest II, Duke of Saxe-Weimar
4. Johann Ernst III, Duke of Saxe-Weimar
9. Princess Christine Elisabeth of Schleswig-Holstein-Sonderburg
2. Ernest Augustus I, Duke of Saxe-Weimar-Eisenach
10. John VI, Prince of Anhalt-Zerbst
5. Princess Sophie Auguste of Anhalt-Zerbst
11. Sophie Augusta of Holstein-Gottorp
1. Princess Ernestine of Saxe-Weimar
12. Christian Henry, Margrave of Brandenburg-Kulmbach
6. George Frederick Charles, Margrave of Brandenburg-Bayreuth
13. Sophie Christiane of Wolfstein
3. Princess Sophie Charlotte of Brandenburg-Bayreuth
14. Frederick Louis, Duke of Schleswig-Holstein-Sonderburg-Beck
7. Princess Dorothea of Schleswig-Holstein-Sonderburg-Beck
15. Louise Charlotte of Schleswig-Holstein-Sonderburg-Augustenburg

Princess Ernestine of Saxe-Weimar-Eisenach House of Wettin Born: 4 January 1740 Died: 10 June 1786
German royalty
Preceded by Christine Sophie of Brandenburg-Bayreuth	Duchess consort of Saxe-Hildburghausen; 1 July 1758 – 23 September 1780	Succeeded by Charlotte Georgine of Mecklenburg-Strelitz
