= List of heirs to the Norwegian throne =

Traditionally the Norwegian kings had been elected by the several things held around the country. This practise often led to there being several kings at the same time. After the civil wars in the 12th century, Erling Skakke introduced a new law that there would be only one king, and that the oldest surviving son of the previous king should inherit the throne. At the same time, Erling introduced a system where the most powerful men in the country would meet with the power to veto a candidate if they found him to be unsuitable.

Erling's son Magnus V had no heirs.

== 1184–1204 ==
Heir	Status	Relationship to monarch	Became heir	Reason	Ceased to be heir	Reason	Monarch
Sigurd Lavard	Heir apparent	Son	15 June 1184	Father became king	c. 1200	died	Sverre
Håkon	Heir apparent	Son	c.1200	Elder brother died	9 March 1202	Became king	Sverre
Guttorm	Heir presumptive	Nephew	9 March 1202	Uncle became king	1 January 1204	Became king	Håkon III

== 1204–1226 ==
During the reign of Inge II there was never any clear heir, and after his death several relatives claimed the throne. At a church meeting in 1223 it was decided that the church was backing the candidacy of Håkon Håkonsson. There was no heir until his first son was born in 1226.

== 1226–1387 ==
Heir	Status	Relationship to monarch	Became heir	Reason	Ceased to be heir	Reason	Monarch
Olav	Heir apparent	Son	1226	Born	1229	Died	Håkon IV
Håkon	Heir apparent	Son	19 November 1232	Born	5 May 1257	Died	Håkon IV
Magnus	Heir apparent	Son	5 May 1257	Older brother died	16 December 1263	Became king	Håkon IV
Olav	Heir apparent	Eldest son	1262	Born	1267	Died	Magnus VI
Eric	Heir apparent	Son	1268	Born	9 May 1280	Became king	Magnus VI
Håkon	Heir presumptive	Younger brother	9 May 1280	Brother became king	15 July 1299	Became king	Eric II
Magnus	Heir presumptive	Grandson	1316	Born	8 May 1319	Became king	Håkon V
Erik	Heir apparent	Eldest son	1339	Born	15 August 1343	Treaty (brother became king)	Magnus VII
Olav	Heir apparent	Only son	1370	Born	29 July 1380	Became king	Håkon VI

== 1387–1665 ==
Norway became an elected kingdom, and joined several unions with Sweden and Denmark. However, the tradition arose that during his own lifetime the King would choose an heir among his sons and have him hailed as such, strongly influencing the electing council's choice.

Heir	Status	Relationship to monarch	Became heir	Reason	Ceased to be heir	Reason	Monarch
Frederik	Heir elect	Son	1536	Elected	1 January 1559	Became king	Christian III
Christian	Heir elect	Son	1610	Elected	2 June 1647	Died	Christian IV

== Since 1665 ==
Heirs to the Norwegian throne
In real union with the Kingdom of Denmark (Denmark–Norway); House of Oldenburg (1665–1814)
Monarch	Heir	Relationship to monarch	Became heir (date; reason)	Ceased to be heir (date; reason)	Next in line of succession
Frederik III	Crown Prince Christian	Son	14 November 1665; King's Law established	9 February 1670; Father died, became king	Prince Jørgen, brother
Christian V	Prince Jørgen	Brother	9 February 1670; Brother became king	2 October 1671; Son born to king	Anna Sophie, Hereditary Electress of Saxony, sister
Christian V	Crown Prince Frederik	Son	2 October 1671; Born	25 August 1699; Father died, became king	Prince Jørgen, 1671–1672, uncle
Christian V	Crown Prince Frederik	Son	2 October 1671; Born	25 August 1699; Father died, became king	Prince Christian Vilhelm, 1672–1673, brother
Christian V	Crown Prince Frederik	Son	2 October 1671; Born	25 August 1699; Father died, became king	Prince Jørgen, 1673–1675, uncle
Christian V	Crown Prince Frederik	Son	2 October 1671; Born	25 August 1699; Father died, became king	Prince Christian, 1675–1695, brother
Christian V	Crown Prince Frederik	Son	2 October 1671; Born	25 August 1699; Father died, became king	Prince Carl, 1695–1697, brother
Christian V	Crown Prince Frederik	Son	2 October 1671; Born	25 August 1699; Father died, became king	Prince Christian, 1697–1698, son
Christian V	Crown Prince Frederik	Son	2 October 1671; Born	25 August 1699; Father died, became king	Prince Carl, 1698–1699, brother
Frederik IV	Prince Carl	Brother	25 August 1699; Brother became king	10 December 1699; Son born to king	Prince Vilhelm, brother
Frederik IV	Crown Prince Christian	Son	10 December 1699; Born	12 October 1730; Father died, became king	Prince Carl, 1699–1701, uncle
Frederik IV	Crown Prince Christian	Son	10 December 1699; Born	12 October 1730; Father died, became king	Prince Frederik Karl, 1701–1702, brother
Frederik IV	Crown Prince Christian	Son	10 December 1699; Born	12 October 1730; Father died, became king	Prince Carl, 1702–1703, uncle
Frederik IV	Crown Prince Christian	Son	10 December 1699; Born	12 October 1730; Father died, became king	Prince Jørgen, 1703–1704, brother
Frederik IV	Crown Prince Christian	Son	10 December 1699; Born	12 October 1730; Father died, became king	Prince Carl, 1704–1723, uncle
Frederik IV	Crown Prince Christian	Son	10 December 1699; Born	12 October 1730; Father died, became king	Prince Frederik, 1723–1730, son
Christian VI	Crown Prince Frederik	Son	12 October 1730; Father became king	6 August 1746; Father died, became king	Princess Louise, 1730–1745, sister
Christian VI	Crown Prince Frederik	Son	12 October 1730; Father became king	6 August 1746; Father died, became king	Prince Christian, 1745–1746, son
Frederik V	Crown Prince Christian	Son	6 August 1746; Father became king	3 June 1747; Died	Princess Sophie Magdalene, sister
Frederik V	Princess Sophie Magdalene	Daughter	3 June 1747; Brother died	29 January 1749; Son born to king	Princess Louise, 1747, aunt
Frederik V	Princess Sophie Magdalene	Daughter	3 June 1747; Brother died	29 January 1749; Son born to king	Princess Vilhelmine Karoline, 1747–1749, sister
Frederik V	Crown Prince Christian	Son	29 January 1749; Born	14 January 1766; Father died, became king	Princess Sophie Magdalene, 1749–1753, sister
Frederik V	Crown Prince Christian	Son	29 January 1749; Born	14 January 1766; Father died, became king	Prince Frederik, 1753–1766, half-brother
Christian VII	Hereditary Prince Frederik	Half-brother	14 January 1766; Half-brother became king	28 January 1768; Son born to king	Sophie Magdalene, Crown Princess of Sweden, half-sister
Christian VII	Crown Prince Frederik	Son	28 January 1768; Born	13 March 1808; Father died, became king	Prince Frederik, 1768–1791, uncle
Christian VII	Crown Prince Frederik	Son	28 January 1768; Born	13 March 1808; Father died, became king	Prince Christian, 1791, son
Christian VII	Crown Prince Frederik	Son	28 January 1768; Born	13 March 1808; Father died, became king	Prince Frederik, 1791–1797, uncle
Christian VII	Crown Prince Frederik	Son	28 January 1768; Born	13 March 1808; Father died, became king	Prince Christian, 1797, son
Christian VII	Crown Prince Frederik	Son	28 January 1768; Born	13 March 1808; Father died, became king	Prince Frederik, 1797–1805, uncle
Christian VII	Crown Prince Frederik	Son	28 January 1768; Born	13 March 1808; Father died, became king	Prince Christian Frederik, 1805–1808, first cousin
Frederik VI	Hereditary Prince Christian Frederik	First cousin	13 March 1808; First cousin became king	7 February 1814; First cousin abdicated, real union dissolved and independence of Norway	Prince Ferdinand, 1808, brother
Frederik VI	Hereditary Prince Christian Frederik	First cousin	13 March 1808; First cousin became king	7 February 1814; First cousin abdicated, real union dissolved and independence of Norway	Prince Frederik, 1808–1814, son
Kingdom of Norway (1814); House of Oldenburg (1814)
Monarch	Heir	Relationship to monarch	Became heir (date; reason)	Ceased to be heir (date; reason)	Next in line of succession
Christian Frederik	Prince Frederik of Denmark, 1814, son	Son	17 May 1814; Father elected as king	10 October 1814; Father abdicated, personal union with Sweden established	Prince Ferdinand of Denmark, uncle
In personal union with the Kingdom of Sweden (Sweden–Norway); House of Holstein-Gottorp (1751–1818)
Monarch	Heir	Relationship to monarch	Became heir (date; reason)	Ceased to be heir (date; reason)	Next in line of succession
Karl II	Crown Prince Karl Johan	Adopted son	4 November 1814; Adoptive father elected as king	5 February 1818; Adoptive father died, became king	Prince Oscar, Duke of Södermanland, son
In personal union with the Kingdom of Sweden (Sweden–Norway); House of Bernadotte (1818–1905)
Monarch	Heir	Relationship to monarch	Became heir (date; reason)	Ceased to be heir (date; reason)	Next in line of succession
Karl III Johan	Crown Prince Oscar, Duke of Södermanland	Son	5 February 1818; Father became king	8 March 1844; Father died, became king	None, 1818–1826
Karl III Johan	Crown Prince Oscar, Duke of Södermanland	Son	5 February 1818; Father became king	8 March 1844; Father died, became king	Prince Karl, Duke of Skåne, 1826–1844, son
Oscar I	Crown Prince Karl, Duke of Skåne	Son	8 March 1844; Father became king	8 July 1859; Father died, became king	Prince Gustaf, Duke of Uppland, 1844–1852, brother
Oscar I	Crown Prince Karl, Duke of Skåne	Son	8 March 1844; Father became king	8 July 1859; Father died, became king	Prince Oscar, Duke of Östergötland, 1852, brother
Oscar I	Crown Prince Karl, Duke of Skåne	Son	8 March 1844; Father became king	8 July 1859; Father died, became king	Prince Carl Oscar, Duke of Södermanland, 1852–1854, son
Oscar I	Crown Prince Karl, Duke of Skåne	Son	8 March 1844; Father became king	8 July 1859; Father died, became king	Prince Oscar, Duke of Östergötland, 1854–1859, brother
Karl IV	Prince Oscar, Duke of Östergötland	Brother	8 July 1859; Brother became king	13 September 1872; Brother died, became king	Prince Gustaf, Duke of Värmland, son
Oscar II	Crown Prince Gustaf, Duke of Värmland	Son	13 September 1872; Father became king	7 June 1905; Father deposed, personal union dissolved	Prince Oscar, Duke of Gotland, 1872–1882, brother
Oscar II	Crown Prince Gustaf, Duke of Värmland	Son	13 September 1872; Father became king	7 June 1905; Father deposed, personal union dissolved	Prince Gustaf Adolf, Duke of Skåne, 1882–1905, son
After the personal union with Sweden; House of Glücksburg (since 1905)
Monarch	Heir	Relationship to monarch	Became heir (date; reason)	Ceased to be heir (date; reason)	Next in line of succession
Haakon VII	Crown Prince Olav	Son	18 November 1905; Father elected as king, confirmed by referendum	21 September 1957; Father died, became king	None, 1905–1937
Haakon VII	Crown Prince Olav	Son	18 November 1905; Father elected as king, confirmed by referendum	21 September 1957; Father died, became king	Prince Harald, 1937–1957, son
Olav V	Crown Prince Harald	Son	21 September 1957; Father became king	17 January 1991; Father died, became king	None, 1957–1973
Olav V	Crown Prince Harald	Son	21 September 1957; Father became king	17 January 1991; Father died, became king	Prince Haakon, 1973–1991, son
Harald V	Crown Prince Haakon	Son	17 January 1991; Father became king	28 August 2026; Father died, became king	Princess Märtha Louise, 1991–2004, sister
Harald V	Crown Prince Haakon	Son	17 January 1991; Father became king	28 August 2026; Father died, became king	Princess Ingrid Alexandra, 2004–2026, daughter
Haakon VIII	Crown Princess Ingrid Alexandra	Daughter	28 August 2026; Father became king	Incumbent	Prince Sverre Magnus, brother
