= Frederick Augustus, Count of Erbach-Fürstenau =

Frederick Augustus, Count of Erbach-Fürstenau (5 May 1754 – 12 March 1784), was a member of the German House of Erbach who held the fiefs of Fürstenau, Michelstadt and Breuberg.

Born in Schloss Fürstenau, Michelstadt, he was the eldest child of George Albert III, Count of Erbach-Fürstenau and Josepha Eberhardine, a daughter of Christian, Prince of Schwarzburg-Sondershausen-Neustadt.

== Life ==
Like others members of his family, Frederick Augustus pursued a military career, becoming Colonel of cavalry in the Netherlands.

In 1778 he succeeded his father as Count of Erbach–Fürstenau and Lord of Breuberg. Following the institution of primogeniture, he was able to become sole ruler.

In Dürkheim on 6 August 1782 Frederick Augustus married with Charlotte Louise Polyxene (*27 November 1755 – 20 May 1844), a daughter of Frederick Charles Kolb, Count of Wartenberg-Roth and Caroline Polyxena of Leiningen-Dagsburg-Hardenburg. They had no children.

Frederick Augustus died in Schloss Fürstenau aged 29 and was buried in Michelstadt. Because he died childless, he was succeeded by his younger brother Christian Charles Augustus Albert.
