= Johann William, Count of Erbach-Fürstenau =

Johann William, Count of Erbach-Fürstenau (13 February 1707 – 1 August 1742), was a member of the German House of Erbach who held the fiefs of Fürstenau, Michelstadt and Breuberg.

Born in Hanau, he was the fourth child and only son of Philipp Charles, Count of Erbach-Fürstenau and his first wife Caroline Amalie, a daughter of Johann Dietrich, Count of Kunowitz.

== Life ==
After the death of his father in 1736, he inherited all the Erbach-Fürstenau lands jointly with his two surviving half-brothers, but because they are minors at that time, Johann William ruled alone over all the territories.

Johann William died suddenly in Hildburghausen aged 35 while visiting his older sister Caroline Amalie, Duchess consort of Saxe-Hildburghausen, and was buried in Michelstadt. Because he never married or had issue, his half-brothers inherited the Erbach-Fürstenau lands.
