= Christiane Sophie Charlotte of Brandenburg-Bayreuth =

Christiane Sophie Charlotte of Brandenburg-Kulmbach
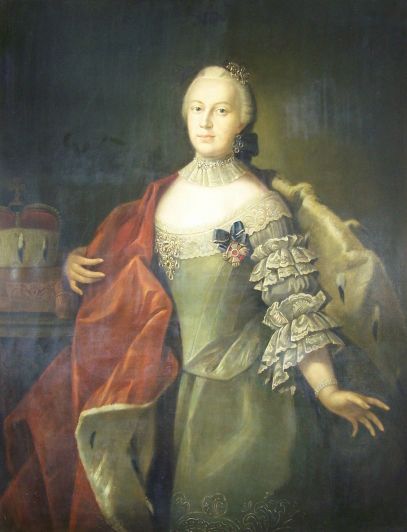
- Portrait, 1755

Duchess consort of Saxe-Hildburghausen
- Tenure: 20 January 1757 – 8 October 1757
- Born: 15 October 1733; Neustadt an der Aisch
- Died: 8 October 1757 (aged 23); Jagdschloss Seidingstadt in Straufhain
- Spouse: Ernest Frederick III, Duke of Saxe-Hildburghausen (m. 1757)
- Issue: Marie Sophie Friederike Caroline
- House: House of Hohenzollern
- Father: Frederick Christian, Margrave of Brandenburg-Bayreuth
- Mother: Victoria Charlotte of Anhalt-Zeitz-Hoym

Christiane Sophie Charlotte of Brandenburg-Kulmbach (15 October 1733 in Neustadt an der Aisch – 8 October 1757 in Jagdschloss Seidingstadt in Straufhain) was a member of the Kulmbach-Bayreuth branch of the Franconian line of the House of Hohenzollern and was, by marriage, Duchess of Saxe-Hildburghausen.

== Life ==
Christiane Sophie Charlotte was the only surviving child of Margrave Frederick Christian of Brandenburg-Bayreuth from his marriage to Victoria Charlotte, the daughter of Prince Victor Amadeus Adolf I of Anhalt-Bernburg-Schaumburg-Hoym.

Christiane Sophie Charlotte was raised in Copenhagen, at the court of her aunt, Queen of Denmark Sophia Magdalene of Denmark, together with her cousin Louise. After mediation by her aunt, Christiane married on 20 January 1757 at Christiansborg Palace to the Queen's former son-in-law Duke Ernest Frederick III of Saxe-Hildburghausen.

Christiane was described as very pious; however, and unlike her predecessor (who had insisted on rigid court etiquette), she had a lavish lifestyle, with elaborate parties and had a special fondness for hunting. At the entrance of the former Jagdschloss Seidinstadt, two antlers are on display, from two deer she shot while hunting in 1757. She died in childbirth, four days after giving birth to Princess Marie Sophie Friederike Caroline, who died nine days later.

Christiane Sophie Charlotte of Brandenburg-Bayreuth House of Hohenzollern Born: 15 October 1733 Died: 8 October 1757
German royalty
| Vacant Title last held by Louise of Denmark | Duchess consort of Saxe-Hildburghausen; 20 January 1757 – 8 October 1757 | Vacant Title next held by Ernestine of Saxe-Weimar |
