= Ernest Frederick III =

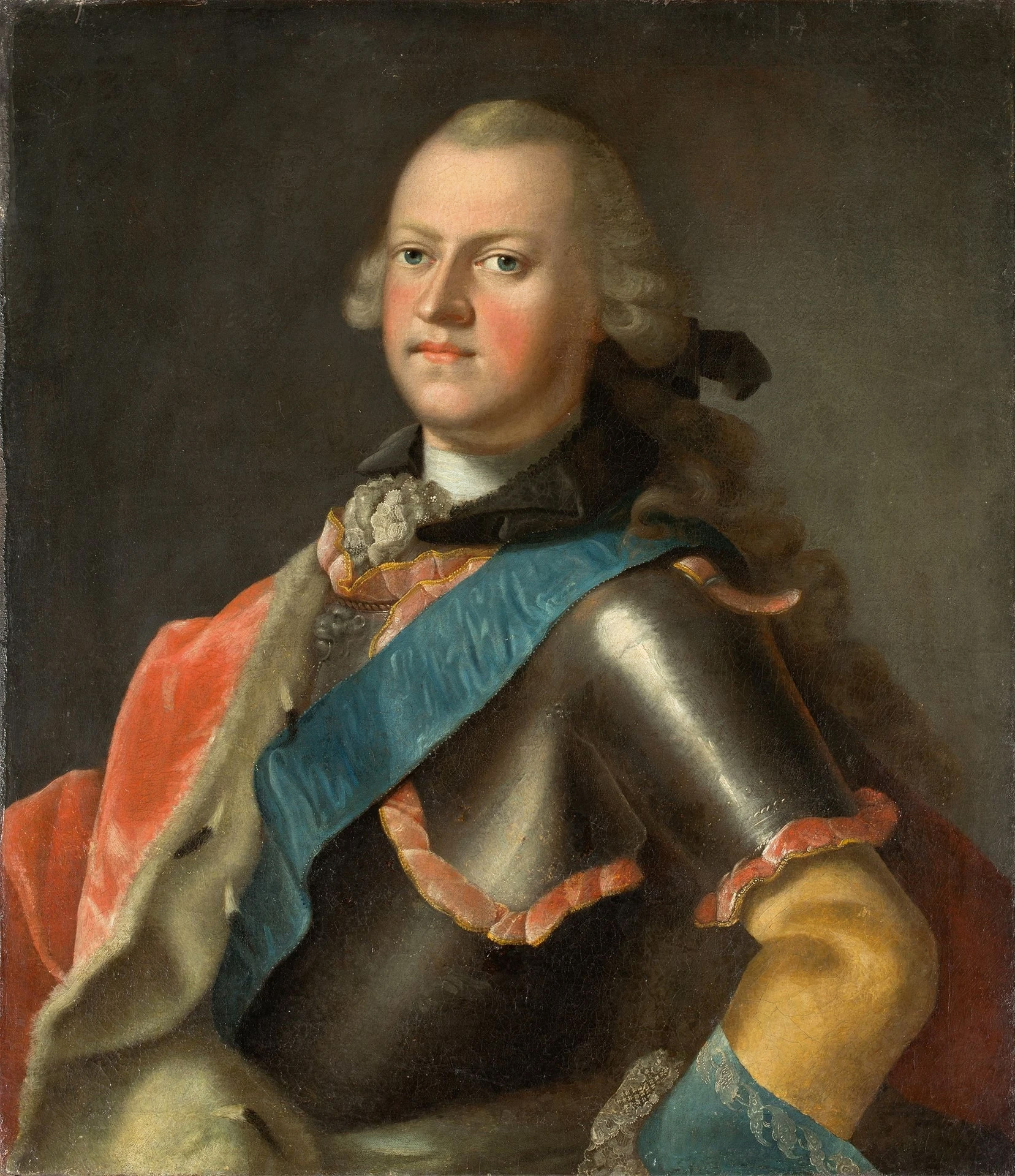
- Portrait c. 1750

Duke of Saxe-Hildburghausen
- Reign: 13 August 1745 – 23 September 1780
- Predecessor: Ernest Frederick II
- Successor: Frederick
- Regent: The Dowager Duchess
- Born: 10 June 1727; Königsberg, Bavaria
- Died: 23 September 1780 (aged 53); Seidingstadt
- Spouse: Louise of Denmark (m. 1749; died 1756) Christiane Sophie Charlotte of Brandenburg-Bayreuth (m. 1757; died 1757) Ernestine of Saxe-Weimar (m. 1758)
- Issue: Princess Juliane; Princess Marie; Ernestine, Hereditary Princess of Saxe-Coburg-Saalfeld; Princess Christine; Frederick, Duke of Saxe-Hildburghausen
Names
- Ernst Frederick Karl
- House: Saxe-Hildburghausen
- Father: Ernst Frederick II, Duke of Saxe-Hildburghausen
- Mother: Caroline of Erbach-Fürstenau
- Religion: Lutheranism

Ernest Frederick III Karl (10 June 1727 in Königsberg in Bayern – 23 September 1780 in Seidingstadt), was a duke of Saxe-Hildburghausen.

== Early life and regency ==
Ernest Frederick III was born on 10 June 1727. He was the eldest son of Ernst Frederick II, Duke of Saxe-Hildburghausen and Caroline of Erbach-Fürstenau.

Ernest Frederick III succeeded his father as Duke of Saxe-Hildburghausen on 13 August 1745, when he was eighteen years old; as a result his mother, the Dowager Duchess Caroline, acted as a regent on his behalf until he reached adulthood, in 1748. He was considered to be intelligent, talented, and one of the most handsome princes of his time.

== Reign and financial crisis ==
He donated a library to the city, but finally his excessive prodigality in exaggerated court pomp and military splendor drew the attention of the highest places to the financial situation of his country.

The Emperor Joseph II created a debit commission under management of the Duchess Charlotte Amalie of Saxe-Meiningen and prince Joseph of Saxe-Hildburghausen, the granduncle of the duke, to investigate the demands of the creditors and adjust the incomes and expenditures to 1769. The financial situation of the country was so disastrous that 35 years duration of this commission could not repair conditions completely.

After Ernest Frederick made use in 1757 of the Münzregal (Imperial coinage regale), he was entangled in a complaint of the realm treasury. Finally, the huge fire of the city of Hildburghausen in 1779, forced Ernst Frederick to move to his hunting residence in Seidingstadt.

== Marriage and issue ==
In the Hirschholm Palace, north of Copenhagen on 1 October 1749, Ernst Frederick was first married to Princess Louise of Denmark, daughter of the King Christian VI. They had one daughter:

1. Princess Friederike Sophie Juliane Karoline of Saxe-Hildburghausen (b. Hildburghausen, 5 December 1755 – d. Hildburghausen, 10 January 1756)

In the Christiansborg Palace, Copenhagen on 20 January 1757, five months after the death of his first wife, Ernst Frederick was married for the second time to Christiane Sophie Charlotte of Brandenburg-Bayreuth. They had one daughter:

1. Princess Friederike Sophie Marie Karoline of Saxe-Hildburghausen (b. Seidingstadt, 4 October 1757 – d. Seidingstadt, 17 October 1757)

In Bayreuth on 1 July 1758, nine months after the death of his second wife, Ernst Frederick was married for the third time to Ernestine, a daughter of Duke Ernst August I of Saxe-Weimar. They had three children:

1. Princess Ernestine Frederike Sophie of Saxe-Hildburghausen (b. Hildburghausen, 22 February 1760 – d. Coburg, 28 October 1776), married on 6 March 1776 to Franz Frederick Anton, Duke of Saxe-Coburg-Saalfeld. She died childless six months after her wedding.
2. Princess Christiane Sophie Caroline of Saxe-Hildburghausen (b. Hildburghausen, 4 December 1761 – d. Öhringen, 10 January 1790), married on 13 March 1778 to her uncle Eugen of Saxe-Hildeburghausen, who was her father's own brother. They had no children.
3. Frederick, Duke of Saxe-Hildburghausen (b. Hildburghausen, 29 April 1763 – d. Jagdhaus Hummelshain, Altenburg, 29 September 1834). He married Charlotte Georgine of Mecklenburg-Strelitz, sister of the queens of Prussia and Hanover; they became the parents of 12 children

== Death and succession ==
Ernest Frederick III died on 23 September 1780 at Jagdschloss Seidingstadt, at the age of 53. He was succeeded by his son Frederick, during Frederick's minority his great-grand uncle Joseph acted as regent on his behalf until 1787.

== Ancestry ==
Ancestors of Ernest Frederick III

8. Ernest, Duke of Saxe-Hildburghausen
4. Ernest Frederick I, Duke of Saxe-Hildburghausen
9. Sophie of Waldeck
2. Ernest Frederick II, Duke of Saxe-Hildburghausen
10. George Louis I, Count of Erbach-Erbach
5. Countess Sophia Albertine of Erbach-Erbach
11. Countess Amalia Katharina of Waldeck-Eisenberg
1. Ernest Frederick III, Duke of Saxe-Hildburghausen
12. George Albert II, Count of Erbach-Fürstenau
6. Philip Charles, Count of Erbach-Fürstenau
13. Anna Dorothea Christine of Hohenlohe-Waldenburg
3. Caroline of Erbach-Fürstenau
14. John Theodoric, Count of Kunowitz
7. Caroline Amalie of Kunowitz
15. Dorothea of Lippe-Brake

Ernest Frederick III House of Wettin Born: 10 June 1727 Died: 23 September 1780
Preceded by Ernst Frederick II	Duke of Saxe-Hildburghausen; 1745–1780	Succeeded by Frederick
