= Prince Eugene of Saxe-Hildburghausen =

Eugene of Saxe-Hildburghausen
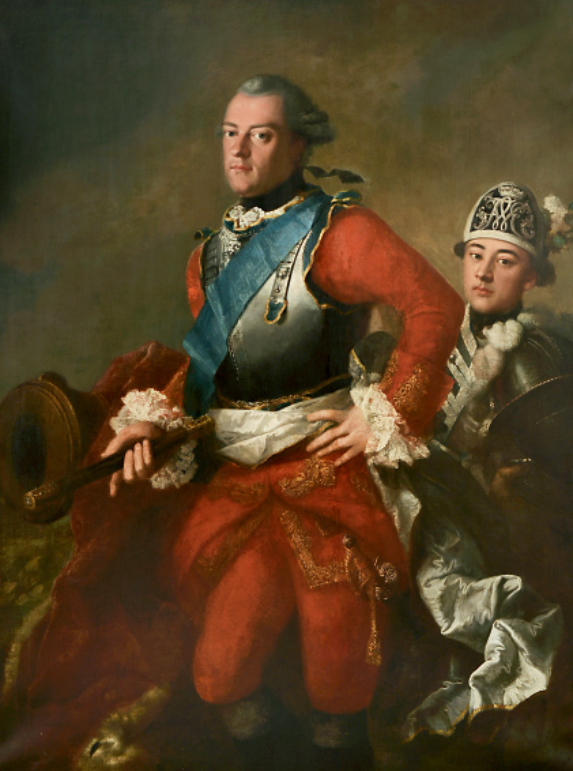
- Born: 8 October 1730; Hildburghausen
- Died: 4 December 1795 (aged 65); Öhringen
- Spouse: Christiane of Saxe-Hildburghausen
- Father: Ernest Frederick II, Duke of Saxe-Hildburghausen
- Mother: Caroline of Erbach-Fürstenau

Frederick William Eugene of Saxe-Hildburghausen (German: Friedrich Wilhelm Eugen von Sachsen-Hildburghausen; 8 October 1730 - 4 December 1795) was a Prince of Saxe-Hildburghausen.

== Life ==
Eugene was born on 8 October 1730 in Hildburghausen. He was the younger son of the Duke Ernest Frederick II of Saxe-Hildburghausen and his wife Countess Caroline of Erbach-Fürstenau. His godfather was, in addition to other princes, Prince Eugene of Savoy. At the wedding of his brother Ernest Frederick III Charles with the only daughter of the Danish royal couple, he was awarded the Ordre de l'Union Parfaite. In Danish royal service he attained the rank of lieutenant-general of the infantry and in Hildburghausen, he was commander of the Artillery Corps.

In 1765, Eugene founded the porcelain factory at Kloster Veilsdorf. His brother and the Duke, gave the factory many privileges. Economic success, however, remained low.

Eugene was the owner of the manor Weitersroda where he founded a new parish and built a new church and a royal villa. In Hildburghausen, he was the tenant of the mint and builder of the so-called Hoheitshaus, one of the most beautiful buildings in the city. Eugene was a skilled mechanic and gunner.

In 1769, Eugene and his great-uncle Joseph and Duchess Charlotte Amalie of Saxe-Meiningen were appointed Commissioner for the completely indebted Principality of Saxe-Hildburghausen by Emperor Joseph II. He misappropriated assets, leading to the dispute with Prince Joseph.

Following Eugene's disgrace for misappropriation of money, he needed a place to stay. His sister Amalie and her husband Prince Louis of Hohenlohe-Neuenstein-Oehringen invited him to live with them at Castle Öhringen. He accepted their offer and moved in 1770 to Öhringen. A few years later, on 13 March 1778, Eugene married his niece, the Princess Christine, daughter of his brother Ernest Frederick III, Duke of Saxe-Hildburghausen. They had no children. Eugene and his wife resided at Öhringen, in the principality ruled by his brother-in-law Louis, and on a modest property belonging to him, until their respective deaths. Eugene's wife Christiane died in 1790 and he died in 1795.

== Ancestry ==
Ancestors of Prince Eugene of Saxe-Hildburghausen

16. Ernst I, Duke of Saxe-Coburg-Altenburg
8. Ernest, Duke of Saxe-Hildburghausen
17. Elisabeth Sophie of Saxe-Altenburg
4. Ernest Frederick I, Duke of Saxe-Hildburghausen
18. Prince Georg Friedrich of Waldeck
9. Sophie of Waldeck
19. Elisabeth Charlotte of Nassau-Siegen
2. Ernest Frederick II, Duke of Saxe-Hildburghausen
20. George Albert I, Count of Erbach-Schönberg (=24)
10. George Louis I, Count of Erbach-Erbach
21. Elisabeth Dorothea of Hohenlohe-Schillingfürst (=25)
5. Countess Sophia Albertine of Erbach-Erbach
22. Philip Dietrich, Count of Waldeck
11. Countess Amalia Katharina of Waldeck-Eisenberg
23. Maria Magdalena of Nassau-Siegen
1. Prince Eugene of Saxe-Hildburghausen
24. George Albert I, Count of Erbach-Schönberg (=20)
12. George Albert II, Count of Erbach-Fürstenau
25. Elisabeth Dorothea of Hohenlohe-Schillingfürst (=21)
6. Philip Charles, Count of Erbach-Fürstenau
26. Philip Gottfried of Hohenlohe-Waldenburg
13. Anna Dorothea Christine of Hohenlohe-Waldenburg
27. Anna Christina of Limpurg-Sontheim
3. Caroline of Erbach-Fürstenau
28. John Bernard, Count of Kunowitz
14. John Dietrich, Count of Kunowitz
29. Anna Elisabeth Wrbna of Freudenthal
7. Charlotte Amalie of Kunowitz
30. Otto, Count of Lippe-Brake
15. Dorothea, Countess of Lippe-Brake
31. Margaret of Nassau-Dillenburg
