= Princess Louise of Denmark (1726–1756) =

Louise of Denmark and Norway
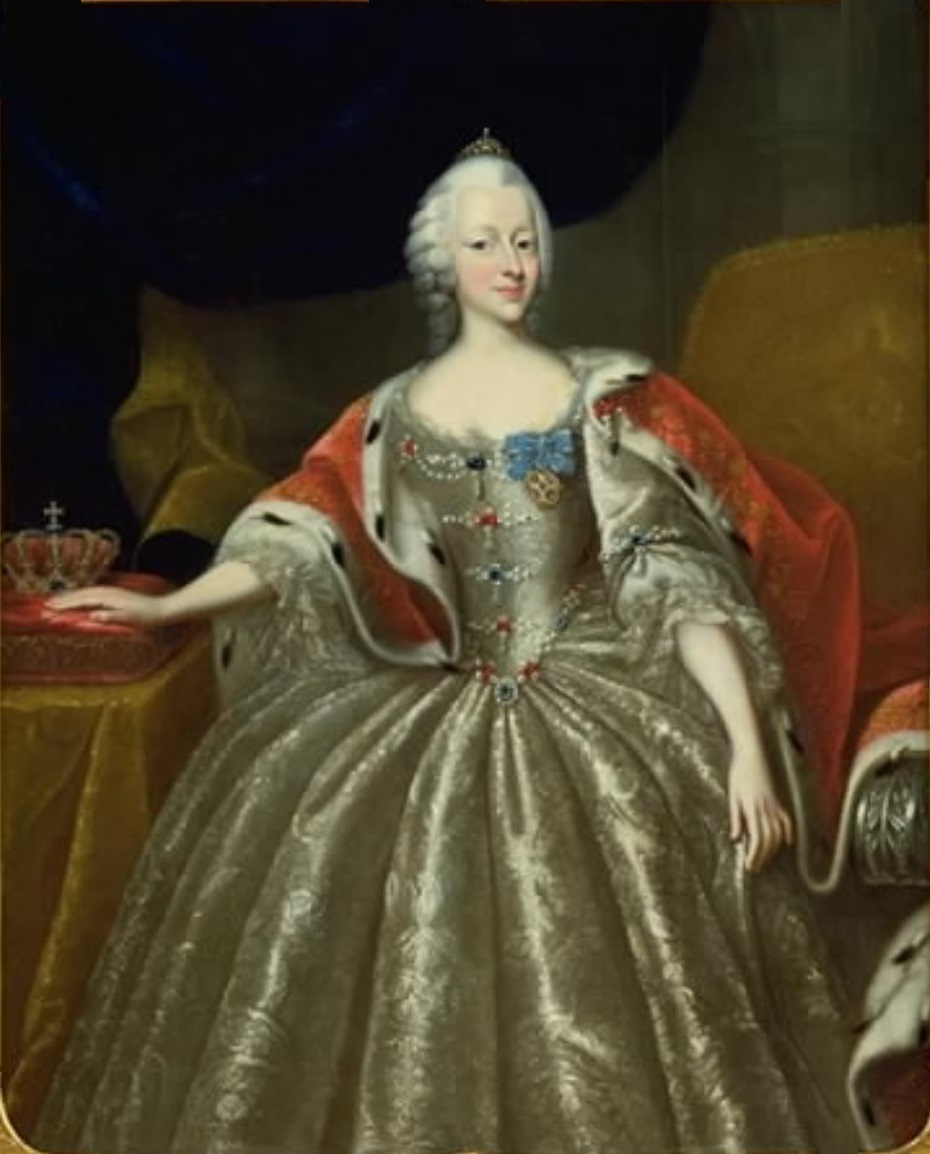
- Portrait by Johann Salomon Wahl, before 1756

Duchess consort of Saxe-Hildburghausen
- Tenure: 1 October 1749 – 8 August 1756
- Born: 19 October 1726; Copenhagen
- Died: 8 August 1756 (aged 29); Hildburghausen
- Spouse: Ernest Frederick III, Duke of Saxe-Hildburghausen (m. 1749)
- Issue: Princess Frederica Sophie
- House: Oldenburg
- Father: Christian VI of Denmark
- Mother: Sophie Magdalene of Brandenburg-Kulmbach

Louise of Denmark and Norway (19 October 1726 – 8 August 1756) was a Danish and Norwegian princess, the daughter of King Christian VI of Denmark and his wife Sophie Magdalene of Brandenburg-Kulmbach. Following her marriage to Ernest Frederick III, Duke of Saxe-Hildburghausen, she became Duchess of Saxe-Hildburghausen.

== Biography ==
Louise was described by foreign diplomats as a lively person, not well suited to the rigid and religious court of her parents. The relations between her and her parents were not good because of their differing personalities. She disliked the strict customs at court; her father complained about her "rebellious nature" in a letter to his friend Count Christian Günther Stolberg. Louise's name is recorded to have played a major role in the delicate diplomatic game that was driven in Christian VI's final years.

=== Scandal and marriage ===
Initially attentions were drawn to get her married soon with George II of Great Britain's younger son, the Duke of Cumberland but this plan were abandoned following Christian VI's attempt to make her Queen of Sweden during the election of the heir to the vacant Swedish throne in 1742–43 through an engagement with the Prince of Zweibrücken-Birkenfeld who acted as France's candidate or the prince of Mecklenburg who were also considered as a suitable option. However, none of these plans came to fruition, amidst the tension between the Danish-Norwegian state and Sweden, Holstein-Gottorp's candidate Adolf Frederick got elected King in 1743 by the Swedish Riksdag, it was a serious topic that a marriage between her and Adolf Frederick would be conducive to an alliance between the two kingdoms, but it was stranded on Christian VI's unwise unwillingness to see his daughter married to a Gottorpian prince.

Under her brother Frederick V's reign in 1749, Louise had an affair—and possibly a child—with a valet de chambre from the noble Danish family Ahlefeldt, who was afterwards sentenced to imprisonment for his audacity in Munkholm Fortress in Norway. Later that year, she was hastily married to Ernest Frederick III, Duke of Saxe-Hildburghausen, with a large dowry to hasten the wedding and calm down the scandal. They married in the Hirschholm Palace, north of Copenhagen, on 1 October 1749.

=== Duchess of Saxe-Hildburghausen ===
As duchess of Saxe-Hildburghausen, she hosted a court known for its formal etiquette, great costs and many parties; she was described as proud and with "royal expenses" in her way of living, amusing herself with ballets, masquerades, balls, hunting and gambling, driving through the streets with a carriage (or, in winters, with a sleigh) of gold and silver.

In December 1755 she gave birth to a daughter, who died after a month: Princess Frederica Sophie Juliane Caroline (5 December 1755 – 10 January 1756).

Louise died on 8 August 1756, she was only 29 years old.

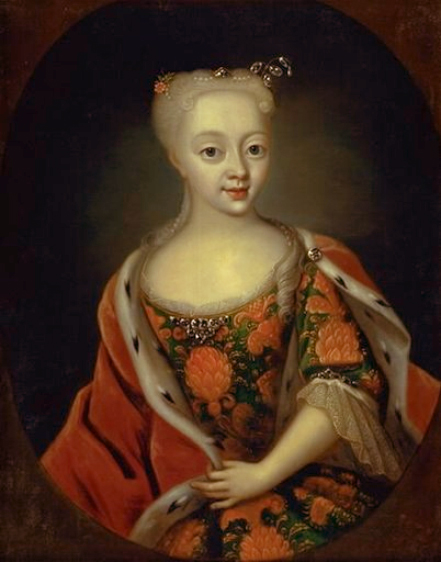
Princess Louise as a child

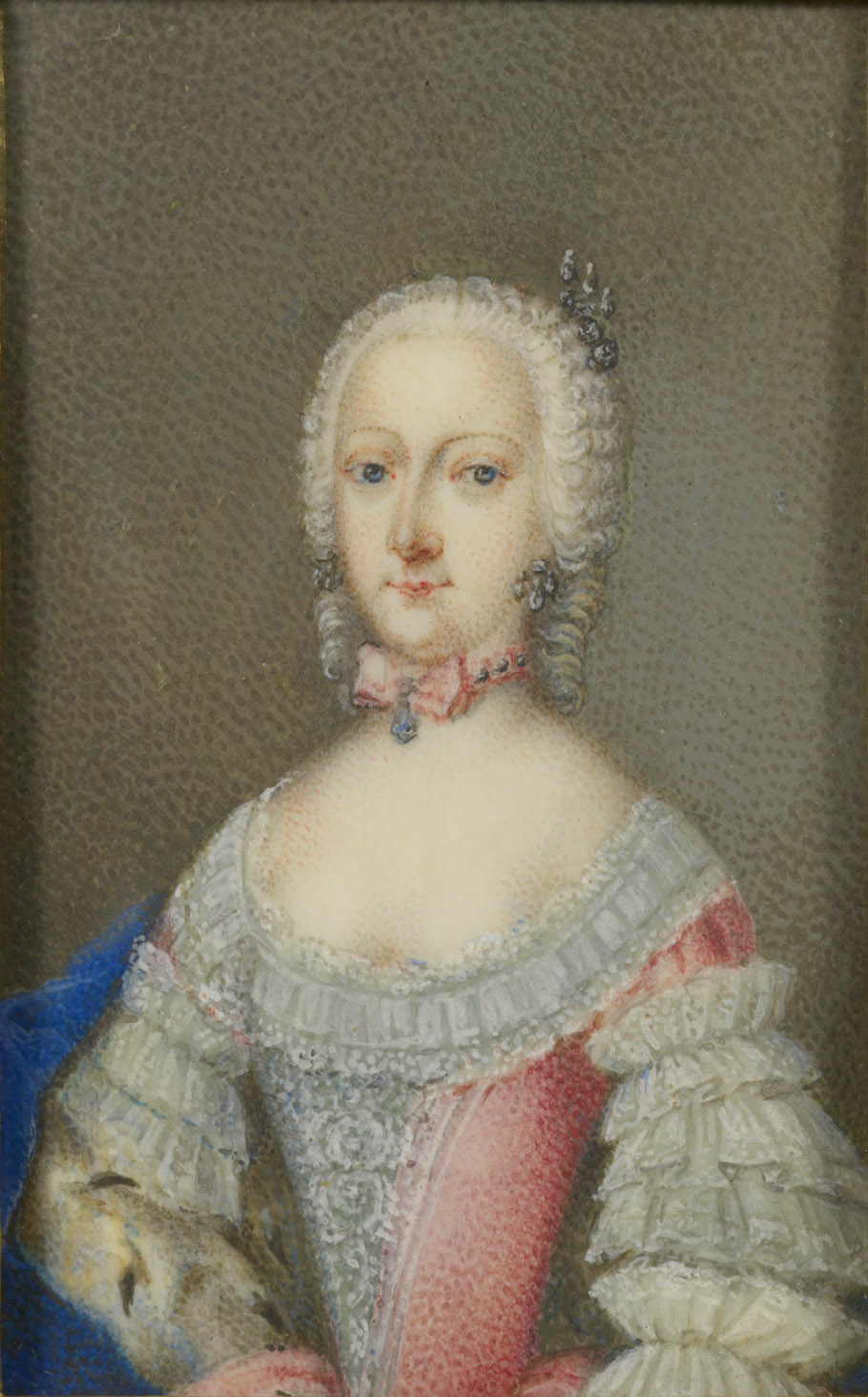
Miniature of the princess inspired by a portrait painted around the time of her marriage

== Ancestry ==
Ancestors of Princess Louise of Denmark

16. Frederick III of Denmark
8. Christian V of Denmark
17. Sophie Amalie of Brunswick-Lüneburg
4. Frederick IV of Denmark
18. William VI, Landgrave of Hesse-Kassel
9. Charlotte Amalie of Hesse-Kassel
19. Margravine Hedwig Sophie of Brandenburg
2. Christian VI of Denmark
20. Johann Albrecht II, Duke of Mecklenburg-Güstrow
10. Gustav Adolf, Duke of Mecklenburg-Güstrow
21. Princess Eleonore Marie of Anhalt-Bernburg
5. Louise of Mecklenburg-Güstrow
22. Frederick III, Duke of Schleswig-Holstein-Gottorp
11. Princess Magdalene Sibylle of Schleswig-Holstein-Gottorp
23. Duchess Marie Elisabeth of Saxony
1. Louise of Denmark
24. Christian, Margrave of Brandenburg-Bayreuth
12. Margrave Georg Albrecht of Brandenburg-Bayreuth
25. Duchess Marie of Prussia
6. Margrave Christian Heinrich of Brandenburg-Kulmbach
26. Philipp, Duke of Schleswig-Holstein-Sonderburg-Glücksburg
13. Princess Marie Elisabeth of Schleswig-Holstein-Sonderburg-Glücksburg
27. Princess Sophie Hedwig of Saxe-Lauenburg
3. Sophie Magdalene of Brandenburg-Kulmbach
28. Johann Friedrich, Count of Wolfstein
14. Albrecht Friedrich, Count of Wolfstein
29. Baroness Barbara Teufel von Guntersdorf
7. Countess Sophie Christiane of Wolfstein
30. Wolfgang Georg I, Count of Castell-Remlingen
15. Countess Sophie Luise of Castell-Remlingen
31. Countess Sophie Juliana of Hohenlohe-Waldenburg-Pfedelbach

Princess Louise of Denmark House of Oldenburg Born: 19 October 1726 Died: 8 August 1756
German royalty
Preceded by Caroline of Erbach-Fürstenau	Duchess consort of Saxe-Hildburghausen; 1 October 1749 – 8 August 1756	Succeeded by Christiane Sophie Charlotte of Brandenburg-Bayreuth
