= Countess Caroline of Erbach-Fürstenau =

Caroline of Erbach-Fürstenau
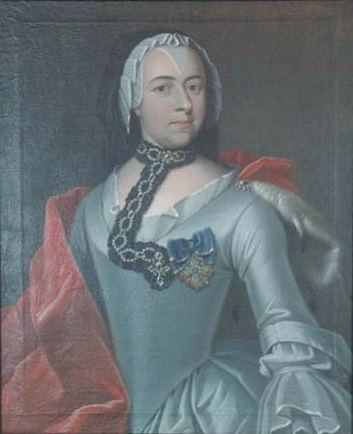
- Copy of a c. 1745 portrait

Duchess of Saxe-Hildburghausen
- Tenure: 19 June 1726 – 13 August 1745
- Born: 29 September 1700; Fürstenau Castle, Michelstadt
- Died: 7 May 1758 (aged 57); Hildburghausen
- Spouse: Ernest Frederick II, Duke of Saxe-Hildburghausen
- Issue: Ernest Frederick III; Prince Eugene; Prince Albert; Princess Amalie of Hohenlohe-Neuenstein
Names
- Caroline Amalie
- House: Erbach-Fürstenau
- Father: Philipp Charles, Count of Erbach-Fürstenau
- Mother: Charlotte Amalie of Kunowitz
- Religion: Lutheranism

Countess Caroline Amalie of Erbach-Fürstenau (29 September 1700 – 7 May 1758), was a countess of Erbach-Fürstenau and by marriage Duchess of Saxe-Hildburghausen. From 1745 to 1748, she was also Regent of Saxe-Hildburghausen.

== Life ==
Caroline was born 29 September 1700. She was a daughter of Count Philipp Charles of Erbach-Fürstenau and Michelstadt, who was also Lord of Breuberg, and his first wife Countess Charlotte Amalie of Kunowitz.

Caroline married on 19 June 1726 at Fürstenau Castle Duke Ernest Frederick II of Saxe-Hildburghausen. The couple lived first in Königsberg in Bayern where the Hereditary Prince Charles Frederick Ernest was born. In 1730 Ernest Frederick built a pleasure palace for his wife, which he called Caroline Castle. In 1744 he also expanded Eisfeld castle, which had been reserved as a Wittum for Caroline.

After the death of Caroline's husband in 1745 she ruled as regent for her minor son Charles Frederick Ernest. In a decree of 1746, she took measures against the "wandering gypsies and begging people", in which even the death penalty was possible. She restructured the Code of Criminal Procedure and banned the sale of a fief, allodial title or real estate without authorization by the sovereign. In a case before the High Court in which the Duchy of Saxe-Meiningen demanded the district of Sonnefeld, which lasted from 1743 to 1752, she was represented by the secret Privy Councillor Johann Sebastian Kobe von Koppenfels, who helped her win the case.

Caroline died on 7 May 1758 in Hildburghausen at the age of 57.

== Issue ==
- Ernest Frederick III Charles (1727–1780), Duke of Saxe-Hildburghausen
- Albert Frederick August (1728–1735)
- Frederick William Eugene (1730–1795), married in 1778 Caroline of Saxe-Hildburghausen (1761-1790)
- Sophie Amalie Caroline (1732–1799), married in 1749 Prince Louis of Hohenlohe-Neuenstein zu Öhringen (1723-1805)

== Notes ==
Countess Caroline of Erbach-Fürstenau House of Erbach-Fürstenau Cadet branch of the House of Erbach Born: 4 January 1740 Died: 10 June 1786
German royalty
Preceded by Sophie Albertine of Erbach-Erbach	Duchess consort of Saxe-Hildburghausen; 19 June 1726 – 13 August 1745	Succeeded by Louise of Denmark
