= Philipp Charles, Count of Erbach-Fürstenau =

Philipp Charles, Count of Erbach-Fürstenau (14 September 1677 – 2 June 1736), was a member of the German House of Erbach who held the fiefs of Fürstenau, Michelstadt, and Breuberg.

Born in Schönberg, he was the third child and second (but eldest surviving) son of George Albert II, Count of Erbach-Fürstenau, and Anna Dorothea Christina, a daughter of Count Philipp Gottfried of Hohenlohe-Waldenburg.

== Life ==
Like several other members of his family, Philipp Charles pursued a military career and became a major-general and colonel of the Franconian Circle. He fought for the Holy Roman Empire at the Battle of Höchstädt in 1703.

After the death of his father in 1717, he ruled jointly with his brothers over all their inheritance, although he managed to keep sole government over himself. In 1718, he became the sovereign Lord of Breuberg.

Philipp Charles died on 2 June 1736 at Fürstenau, aged 58, and was buried in Michelstadt.

He married Charlotte Amalie of Kunowitz and had issue:

- Countess Caroline of Erbach-Fürstenau (1700–1758), married to Ernest Frederick II, Duke of Saxe-Hildburghausen.
- Johann Wilhelm (1707-1748).

After the death of his first wife in 1722, the married Anna Sophia, Baroness von Speßhardt in 1723, and again had issue:

- Ludwig Friedrich (1728-1794).
- Georg Albrecht III (1731-1778).
