= Ernest Frederick II =

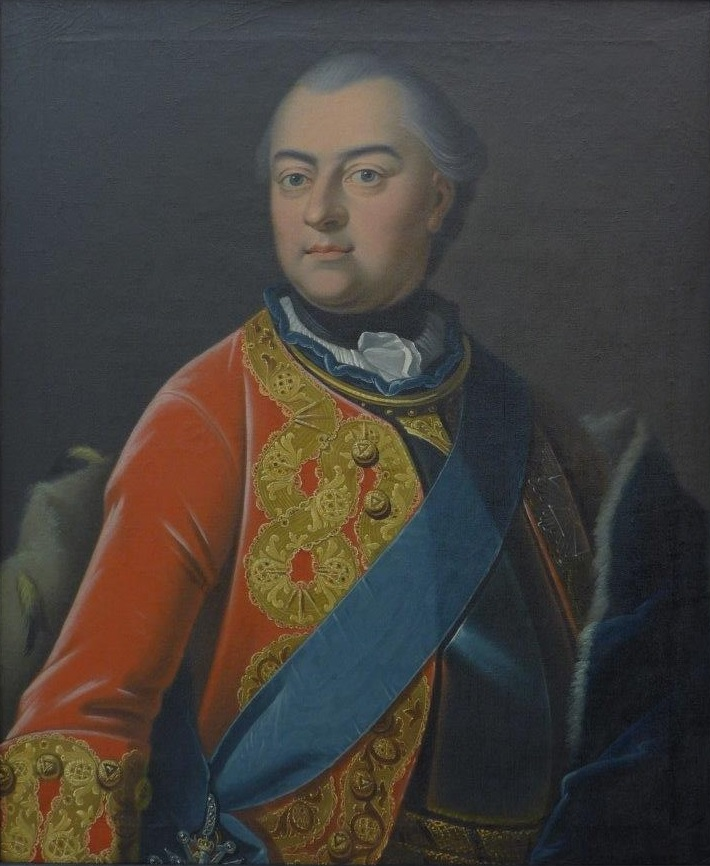

Duke of Saxe-Hildburghausen
- Reign: 9 March 1724 – 13 August 1745
- Predecessor: Ernest Frederick I
- Successor: Ernest Frederick III
- Born: 17 December 1707; Hildburghausen
- Died: 13 August 1745 (aged 37); Hildburghausen
- Spouse: Caroline of Erbach-Fürstenau
- Issue: Ernest Frederick III; Prince Frederick August Albrecht; Prince Frederick Wilhelm Eugen; Princess Sophie Amalie Caroline
- House: Saxe-Hildburghausen
- Father: Ernst Frederick I, Duke of Saxe-Hildburghausen
- Mother: Countess Sophia Albertine of Erbach-Erbach

Ernst Frederick II (17 December 1707 in Hildburghausen – 13 August 1745 in Hildburghausen), was a duke of Saxe-Hildburghausen.

== Early life ==
Ernst Frederick II was born on 17 December 1707 as the third but eldest surviving son of Ernst Frederick I, Duke of Saxe-Hildburghausen and Countess Sophia Albertine of Erbach-Erbach.

The prince was educated in Jena, Geneva, and Utrecht. In 1722, he and his brother Louis Frederick traveled to France, where they took part in the coronation of Louis XV. At the age of 16, he succeeded his father as Duke of Saxe-Hildburghausen on 9 March 1724. As a result, his mother, the Dowager Duchess Sophia Albertine, acted as a regent on his behalf until 1728.

== Reign ==
Ernest Frederick inherited a duchy that was heavily in debt. In 1729, due to lack of funds, he was forced to close the Gymnasuam Illustre, which his grandfather, Ernest, Duke of Saxe-Hildburghausen had founded in 1715. In 1730, at the intercession of his mother, the Jews were granted a special letter of protection that gave them extended rights.

In 1733 he traveled to the court of Charles VI, Holy Roman Emperor in Vienna, where he was appointed imperial colonel field marshal on the recommendation of his uncle Joseph of Saxe-Hildburghausen. In 1743, he received an Infantry Regiment from Charles Theodore, Elector of Bavaria as a Lieutenant-General. Later, Charles VII, Holy Roman Emperor appointed him Quartermaster-General.

He suffered from physical and mental health issues and was unable to address the duchy’s fiscal crisis. The state’s indebtedness had grown so large that its regular revenues were no longer sufficient to cover interest payments.

== Marriage and issue ==
In Fürstenau on 19 June 1726 Ernst Frederick married Caroline of Erbach-Fürstenau (d. July 1745). They had four children:

1. Ernst Frederick III Karl, Duke of Saxe-Hildburghausen (b. Königsberg, 10 June 1727 – d. Seidingstadt, 23 September 1780).
2. Frederick August Albrecht (b. Hildburghausen, 8 August 1728 – d. Hildburghausen, 14 June 1735) Died in childhood.
3. Frederick Wilhelm Eugen (b. Hildburghausen, 8 October 1730 – d. Öhringen, 4 December 1795), married on 13 March 1778 to his niece Caroline of Saxe-Hildburghausen (daughter of Ernst Frederick III). Their marriage was childless.
4. Sophie Amalie Caroline (b. Hildburghausen, 21 July 1732 – d. Öhringen, 19 June 1799), married in 1749 to Ludwig of Hohenlohe-Neuenstein-Öhringen.

== Death and succession ==
Ernst Frederick II died on 13 August 1745 in Hildburghausen, at the age of 37. He was succeeded by his son, Ernst Frederick III, during his son's minority, his wife Caroline of Erbach-Fürstenau acted as regent on his behalf until 1748.

Ernest Frederick II House of Wettin Born: 17 December 1707 Died: 13 August 1745
Preceded by Ernst Frederick I	Duke of Saxe-Hildburghausen; 1724–1745	Succeeded by Ernst Frederick III
