= Amelia Guelph =

Amelia Guelph can refer to:

- Princess Amelia of Great Britain (1711–1786)
- Princess Amelia of the United Kingdom (1783–1810)
