= Augusta Guelph =

Augusta Guelph can refer to:

- Princess Augusta of Great Britain (1737–1813), elder sibling of George III
- Princess Augusta Sophia of the United Kingdom (1769–1840), daughter of George III
- Princess Augusta of Cambridge (1822–1916), granddaughter of George III
