= Prince Octavius of Great Britain =

British prince (1779–1783)

Prince Octavius
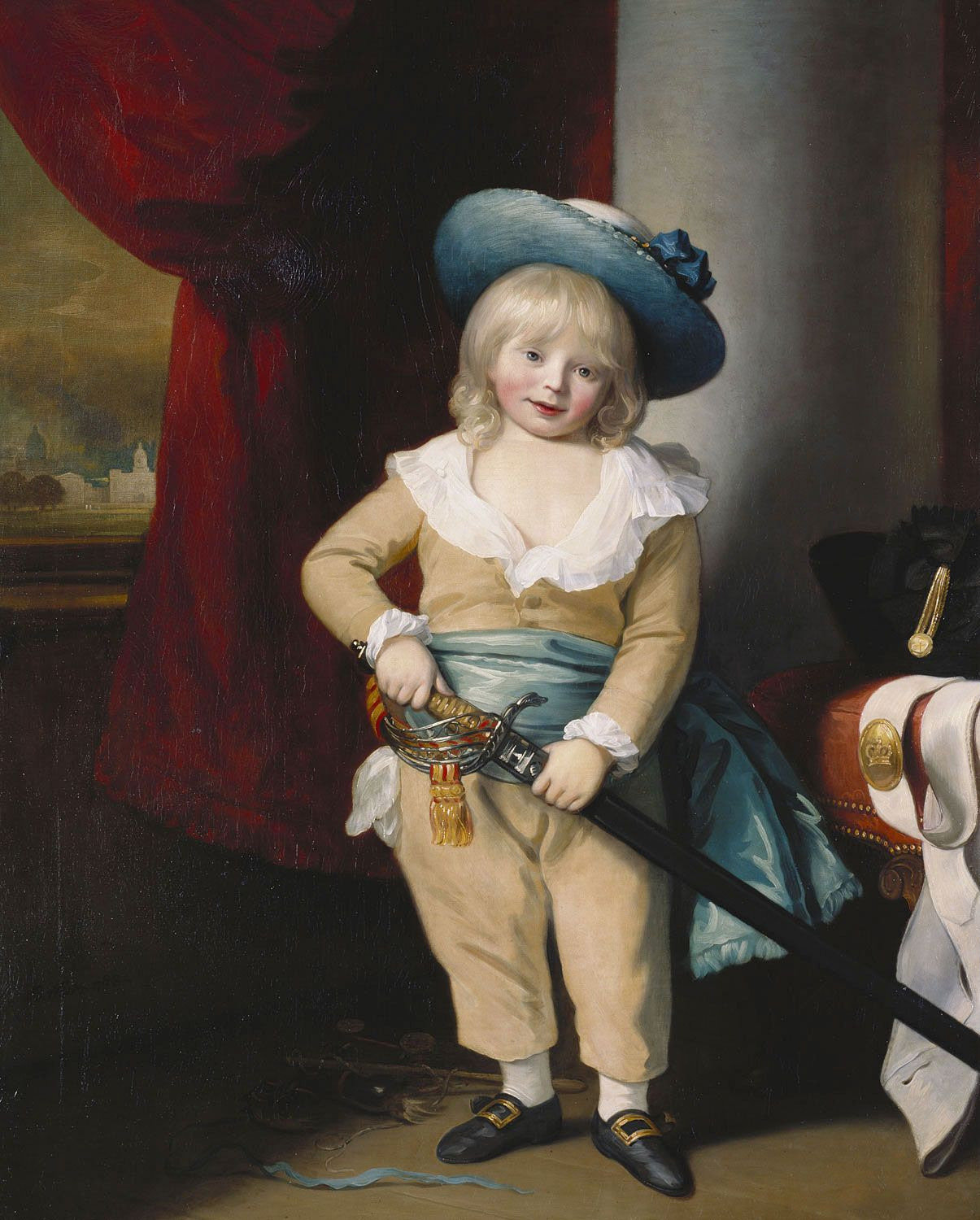
- 1783 portrait
- Born: 23 February 1779; Buckingham House, London, England
- Died: 3 May 1783 (aged 4); Kew Palace, Surrey, England
- Burial: 10 May 1783; Westminster Abbey; 11 February 1820; Royal Vault, St George's Chapel, Windsor Castle
- House: Hanover
- Father: George III
- Mother: Charlotte of Mecklenburg-Strelitz

Prince Octavius of Great Britain (23 February 1779 – 3 May 1783) was the thirteenth child and eighth son of King George III and his queen consort, Charlotte of Mecklenburg-Strelitz. Six months after the death of his younger brother Prince Alfred, Octavius was inoculated against the smallpox virus. Several days later, he became ill. His death at the age of four devastated his parents, and in particular his father. George III had been very fond of Alfred and Octavius, his two youngest sons, and his later bouts of madness involved hallucinations of them.

== Life ==
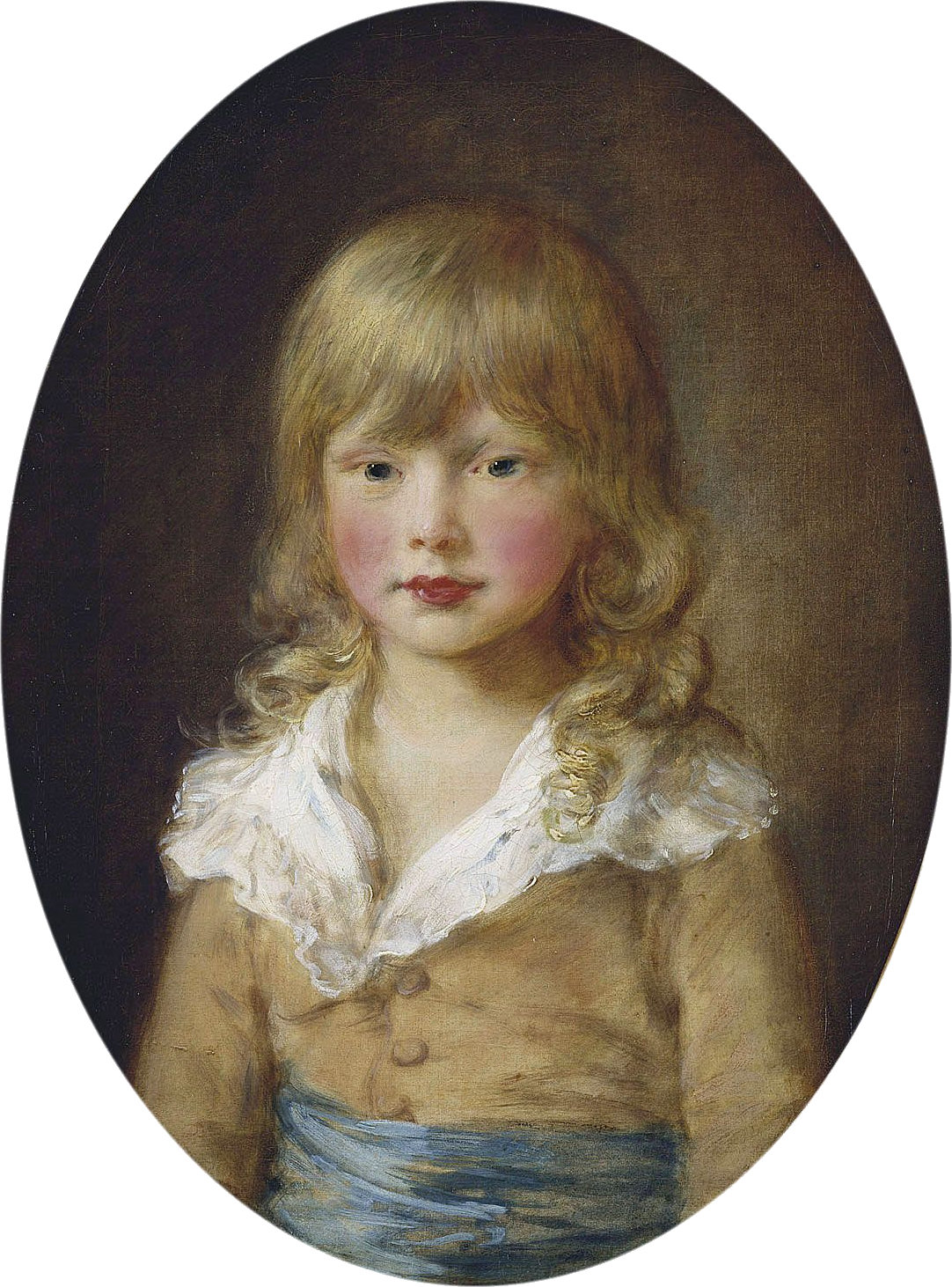
Octavius in 1782, by Thomas Gainsborough

Octavius was born on 23 February 1779 at Buckingham House in London. He was the thirteenth child of King George III and his wife, Charlotte of Mecklenburg-Strelitz. The prince's name derives from Latin octavus, 'eighth', indicating that he was the eighth son of his parents. The House of Lords sent congratulations to the King on his birth.

Octavius was christened on 23 March in the Great Council Chamber at St James's Palace, by Frederick Cornwallis, the Archbishop of Canterbury. His godparents were the Duke of Brunswick-Wolfenbüttel (husband of his first cousin twice-removed), for whom the Earl of Hertford, Lord Chamberlain, stood proxy; the Duke of Mecklenburg-Schwerin (his first cousin once-removed), for whom the Earl of Ashburnham, Groom of the Stole, stood proxy; and the Duchess of Saxe-Weimar-Eisenach (wife of his sixth cousin), for whom Alicia Wyndham, Countess of Egremont, Lady of the Bedchamber to Queen Charlotte, was proxy.

Charlotte Papendiek, a lady-in-waiting to the Queen, noted that Octavius was "a lovely child of sweet disposition, [who] showed every promise of future goodness." King George was extremely devoted to Octavius, who was too young to cause the kinds of trouble that his elder brothers did by this time, which included sexual misconduct and financial irresponsibility. Somewhat unusually for the period, the King was affectionate and indulgent with his young children, and strove to attend their birthday parties and other events organised for their merriment. On one occasion, a friend witnessed a happy domestic scene that involved George "carrying about in his arms by turns Sophia and the last prince, Octavius." Mary Delany, a friend of the King, recalled an encounter with Octavius at the Queen's Lodge, Windsor. In a letter, she described how sweetly George carried Octavius and brought the prince to her in his arms. Octavius then held out his hand to play with Mrs. Delany, and he kissed her cheek at the instigation of his father. Despite the social norm that discouraged public shows of familial affection, she praised the novel way in which the King and Queen raised their children. Another witness wrote that George and Charlotte "have their children always playing about them the whole time"; during most evenings the children were brought to their parents between six and seven in the evening to play for an hour or two. The King also was kept informed of his children's educational progress.

Octavius was attached to Sophia, the sister who was closest to him in age, who called Octavius "her son". He went with her and their siblings, Elizabeth and Edward, to Eastbourne on the Sussex coast, where he could take in the fresh seaside air during the summer of 1780. When he was nineteen months old, Octavius became an older brother with the birth of his younger brother Prince Alfred. Octavius was three years of age when Alfred died on 20 August 1782, making him again the youngest member of the royal family. Horace Walpole wrote to Sir Horace Mann that upon Alfred's death, King George had declared "I am very sorry for Alfred; but had it been Octavius, I should have died too." In 1820, the historian Edward Holt wrote of the Prince's character, "Though Prince Octavius had not passed his fifth year, he was considered very docile, and possessed good-nature in such an uncommon degree, that he was the delight of all about him." The 19th-century biographer John Watkins added that Octavius was "reckoned one of the finest of the royal progeny".

== Death and aftermath ==
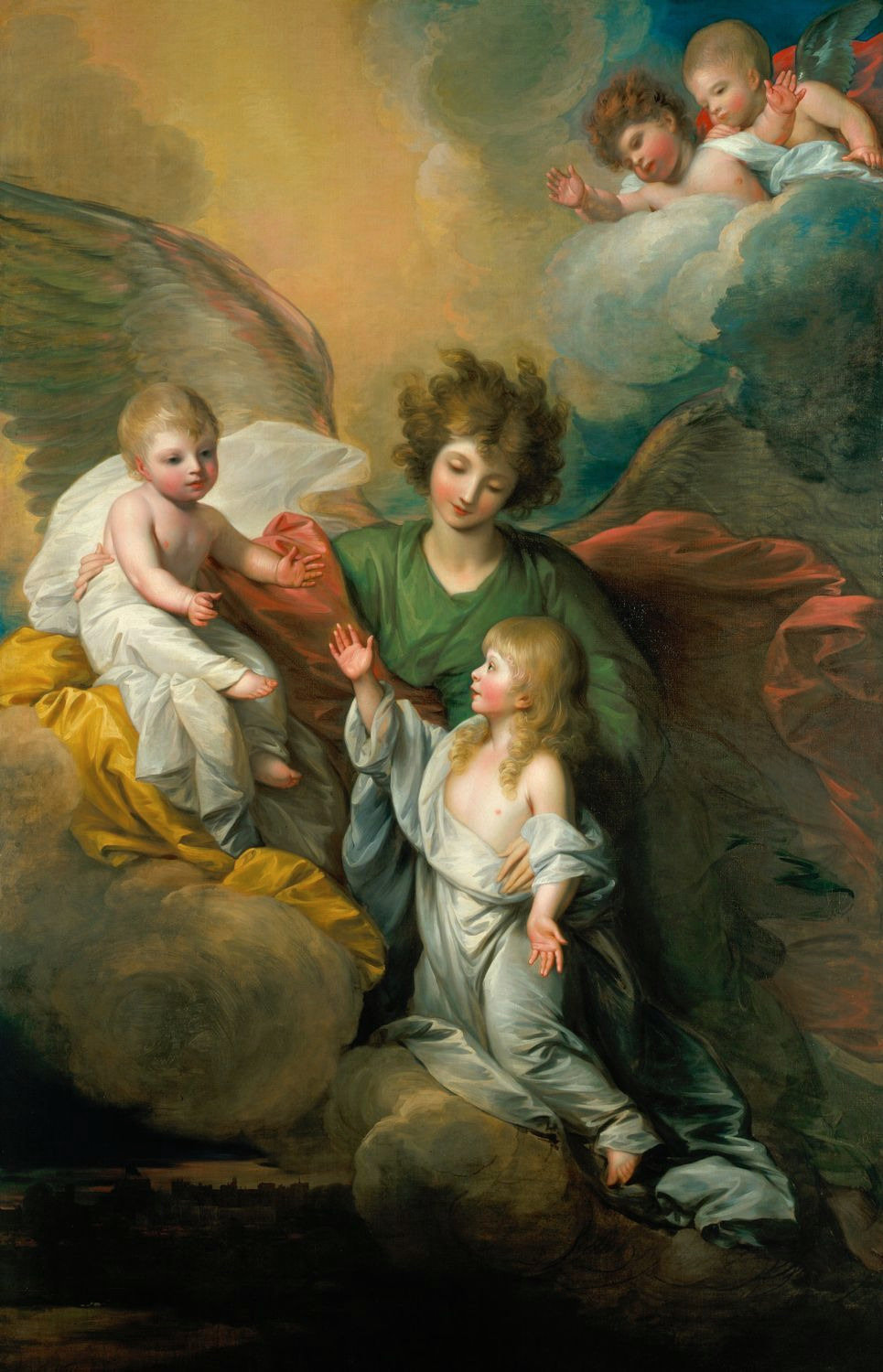
The Apotheosis of Prince Octavius in 1783, by Benjamin West. He is at right, with Alfred at left.

Six months after Alfred's death, Octavius and Sophia were taken to Kew Palace in London to be inoculated against the smallpox virus. Sophia recovered without incident, but Octavius became ill and died several days later, on 3 May 1783 at around eight in the evening. He was four years old. A letter from the governess of the royal children, Lady Charlotte Finch, reported that "Prince Octavius died last night, and indeed, from the time he was taken ill, there was never any hope of his recovery." As was traditional, the household did not go into formal mourning for the deaths of royal children who were that young.

Octavius was the last member of the British royal family to contract smallpox. Members of the royal household asserted that his death was not a result of the inoculation he had received, but rather a cold. Most accounts of George III and his family fail to identify a cause for Octavius's death, but a few mention the inoculation as a potential culprit. The Royal Archives themselves make little mention of the prince's death, merely noting the date and the age at which he died. On 10 May, Octavius was buried alongside his brother Alfred at Westminster Abbey. Their eldest brother, when he became King George IV, had their remains transferred to St. George's Chapel, Windsor Castle on 11 February 1820.

According to Queen Charlotte, Octavius's death was unexpected; she wrote to a friend who faced a similar tragedy that "twice have I felt what you do feel, the last time without the least preparation for such a stroke, for in less than eight and forty hours was my son Octavius, in perfect health, sick and struck with death immediately". The prince's death had a marked effect, both mentally and physically, on Queen Charlotte, who at the time was pregnant with her youngest child, Princess Amelia.

Octavius's death devastated his father; Walpole wrote "the King has lost another little child; a lovely boy, they say, of whom their Majesties were dotingly fond". The rest of the royal court, especially the attendants and caretakers of the young prince, were likewise distraught by Octavius's sudden death. Shortly afterward, King George said "There will be no Heaven for me if Octavius is not there." The day after his son's death, the King passed through a room where artist Thomas Gainsborough was completing the finishing touches on a set of portraits of the family. The King asked him to stop, but when he found out that the painting Gainsborough was working on was of Octavius, allowed the painter to continue. When this same painting was exhibited a week later, Octavius's sisters were so upset that they broke down and cried in front of everyone, and their parents were also visibly touched. Three months after Octavius's death, his father was still dwelling on his son, writing to Lord Dartmouth that every day "increases the chasm I feel for want of that beloved object [Octavius]". In later years, King George imagined conversations with his two youngest sons. During one of the King's bouts of madness in 1788, George mistook a pillow for Octavius, who by that time had been dead for five years.

== Ancestry ==
Ancestors of Prince Octavius of Great Britain

8. George II of Great Britain
4. Frederick, Prince of Wales
9. Princess Caroline of Brandenburg-Ansbach
2. George III of Great Britain
10. Frederick II, Duke of Saxe-Gotha-Altenburg
5. Princess Augusta of Saxe-Gotha
11. Princess Magdalena Augusta of Anhalt-Zerbst
1. Prince Octavius of Great Britain
12. Adolphus Frederick II, Duke of Mecklenburg-Strelitz
6. Duke Charles Louis Frederick of Mecklenburg-Strelitz
13. Princess Christiane Emilie of Schwarzburg-Sondershausen
3. Princess Charlotte of Mecklenburg-Strelitz
14. Ernest Frederick I, Duke of Saxe-Hildburghausen
7. Princess Elisabeth Albertine of Saxe-Hildburghausen
15. Countess Sophia Albertine of Erbach-Erbach
