= Prince Alfred of Great Britain =

British prince (1780–1782)

Prince Alfred
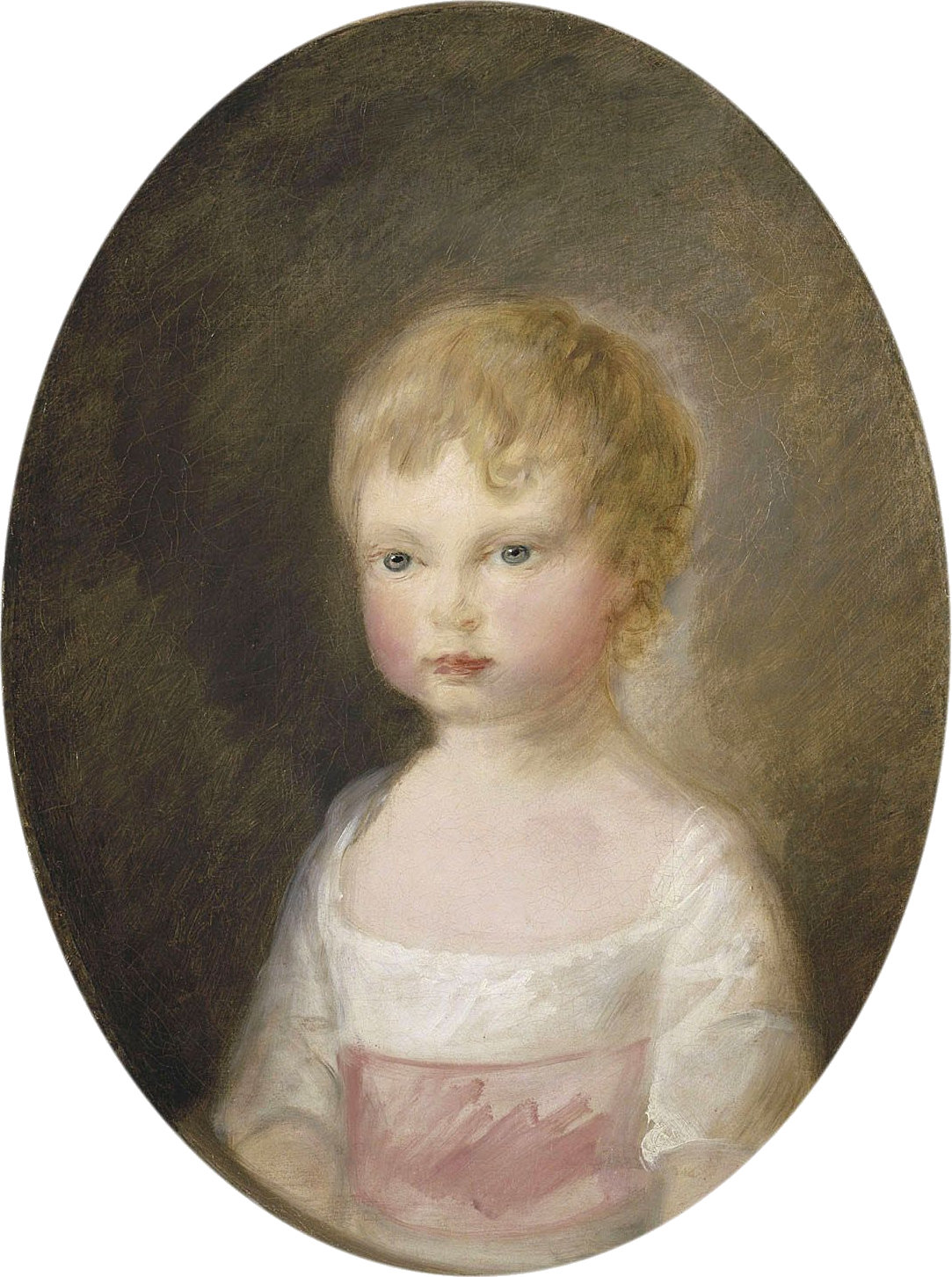
- 1782 portrait
- Born: 22 September 1780; Windsor Castle, Berkshire, England
- Died: 20 August 1782 (aged 1); Lower Lodge, Windsor Great Park, England
- Burial: 27 August 1782 Westminster Abbey 11 February 1820 Royal Vault, St George's Chapel, Windsor Castle
- House: Hanover
- Father: George III
- Mother: Charlotte of Mecklenburg-Strelitz

Prince Alfred of Great Britain (22 September 1780 – 20 August 1782) was the fourteenth child and ninth and youngest son of King George III and his queen consort, Charlotte of Mecklenburg-Strelitz. In 1782, Alfred, who had never enjoyed robust health, became unwell after his inoculation against smallpox. His early death, along with that of his brother Prince Octavius six months later, deeply distressed the royal family. In his later bouts of madness, King George imagined conversations with both of his youngest sons.

== Life ==
Alfred was born on 22 September 1780 at Windsor Castle. He was the fourteenth child and ninth and youngest son of King George III and his queen consort, Charlotte of Mecklenburg-Strelitz, and as such, was a member of the House of Hanover. By the time Alfred was born, his eldest brothers were already near adult age. The prince was baptised by Frederick Cornwallis, the Archbishop of Canterbury, in the Great Council Chamber at St James's Palace on 21 October. His godparents were his elder siblings George, Prince of Wales; Prince Frederick; and Charlotte, Princess Royal.

Alfred's birth brought joy to his family, especially to his older sister Princess Sophia, who, their sister Princess Elizabeth reported, called the new baby her "grandson". From birth, Alfred was a delicate child. He suffered from "eruptions" on his face and, throughout his life, a cough.

== Death and aftermath ==
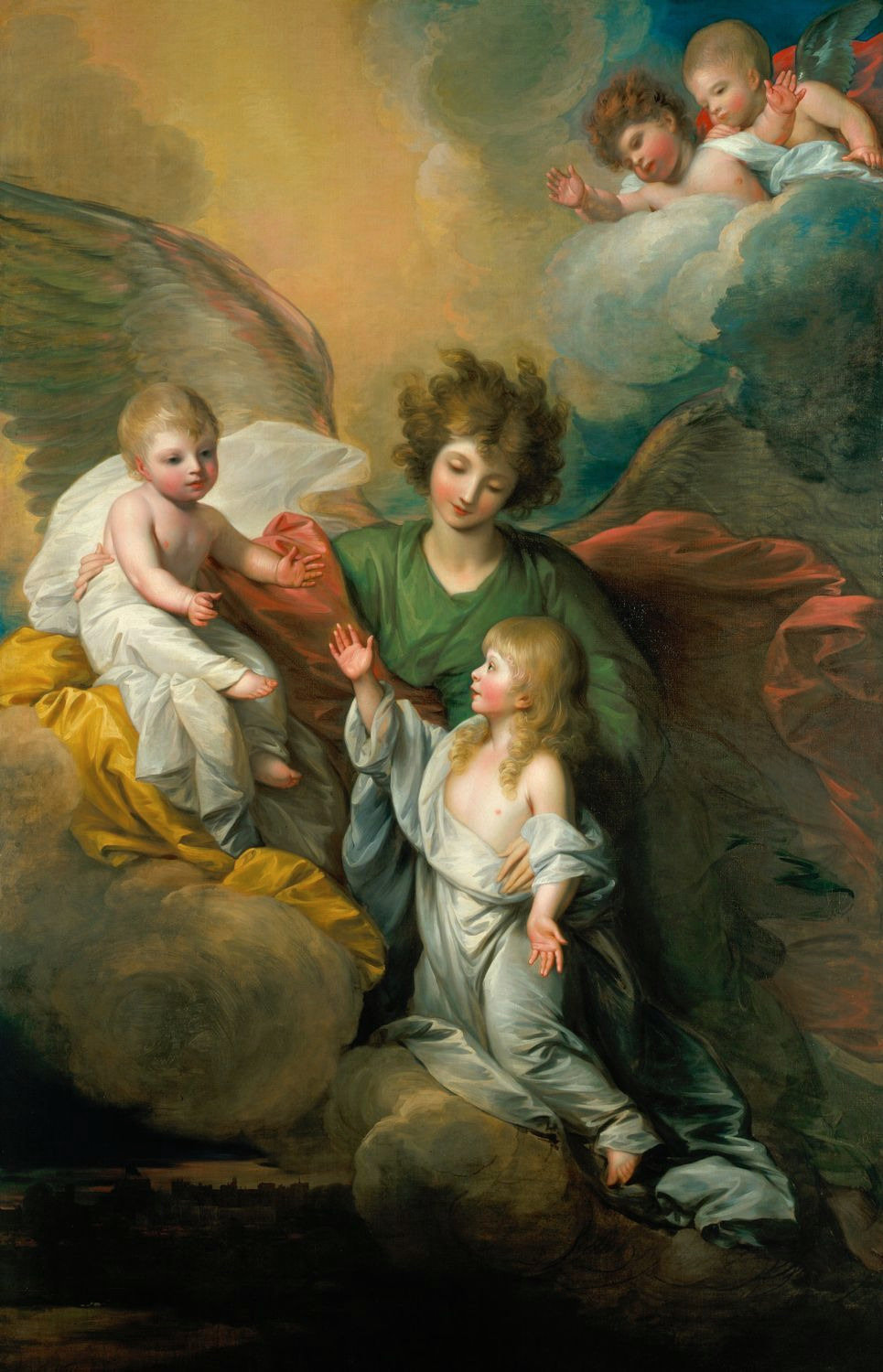
The Apotheosis of Prince Octavius in 1783, by Benjamin West. Alfred (left) welcomes his brother Octavius (right) into Heaven.

At the time, smallpox was a disease dreaded by royalty and commoners alike, and was frequently fatal. Queen Charlotte, Alfred's mother, was a lifelong advocate of inoculation, and she had the royal children undergo the procedure. Variolation, its precursor, was popularised in Britain when the daughters of King George II, then Prince of Wales, underwent the procedure in 1721.

In 1782, Alfred was inoculated against smallpox. The inoculation had a negative effect on his health: it caused eruptions on his face and eyelids, and his chest was also in poor condition. In June, he was taken to Deal with his governess Lady Charlotte Finch and nurse Mrs Cheveley to recover. Physicians hoped that the sea air, bathing in the water, and horseback riding would improve his condition. In letters to her friend Mary Hamilton, Lady Charlotte wrote that "there is no doubt of the seabathing agreeing with him [Prince Alfred]... and his appetite [is] so good that he must gain ground". While he was there, Alfred endeared himself to many with his charm and good nature. Despite this, he continued to break out in spots and his chest was troubling him. In early July, Lady Charlotte reported that Alfred was beginning to recover but, later that month, his condition deteriorated to the point that he was unable to walk. In August, Alfred, Lady Charlotte, and Mrs Cheveley returned to Windsor Castle due to his worsening condition. Doctors gathered to discuss the Prince's health and concluded that the boy had only weeks to live. After suffering bouts of fever and continuing problems with his chest, Alfred died between four and five in the afternoon on 20 August, at Lower Lodge, Windsor Great Park, a month shy of his second birthday.

Although the household did not go into mourning (it was not prescribed for royal children younger than seven), his parents took the loss harshly. According to Lady Charlotte, Queen Charlotte "cried vastly" and was "very much hurt by her loss and the King also". Later that August, the Queen sent Lady Charlotte a lock of Alfred's hair bound in a locket made of pearl and amethyst, stating "Receive This ... as an Acknowledgement for Your very affectionate attendance upon my dear little Angel Alfred, and wear the inclosed Hair, not only in remembrance of that dear Object, but also as a mark of esteem from Your Affectionate Queen." Alfred was buried at Westminster Abbey on 27 August, though his remains were later moved to the Royal Vault in St George's Chapel, Windsor Castle on 11 February 1820. Six months after Alfred's death, his four year old elder brother Octavius succumbed to the smallpox virus after inoculation as well, further devastating the King, although he was more deeply affected by the latter's death. Horace Walpole relayed to Sir Horace Mann that the King had declared "I am very sorry for Alfred; but had it been Octavius, I should have died too." Alfred's father continued to dwell on his sons' deaths, and the sight of Alfred's posthumous portrait in a family painting by Thomas Gainsborough nearly a year after the Prince's death sent his three eldest sisters into tears, and the King and Queen were also visibly touched. During one of his bouts of madness in 1812, George had imaginary conversations with his two youngest sons. (Note: Jeremy Black lists these conversations occurring in 1812; Kenneth Panton believes they happened the previous year, in 1811.)

The first of George III and Queen Charlotte's children to die, Alfred died in 1782, whereas his older sister Princess Mary, who was the last survivor of George III and Queen Charlotte's fifteen children, died in 1857. Alfred is also unique among their first fourteen children for never being an older sibling while he was alive, as the only child younger than him was born after his death.

== Title and style ==
Throughout his life, Alfred was styled as His Royal Highness The Prince Alfred, with the title of a Prince of Great Britain and Ireland.

== Ancestry ==
Ancestors of Prince Alfred of Great Britain

8. George II of Great Britain
4. Frederick, Prince of Wales
9. Princess Caroline of Brandenburg-Ansbach
2. George III of Great Britain
10. Frederick II, Duke of Saxe-Gotha-Altenburg
5. Princess Augusta of Saxe-Gotha
11. Princess Magdalena Augusta of Anhalt-Zerbst
1. Prince Alfred of Great Britain
12. Adolphus Frederick II, Duke of Mecklenburg-Strelitz
6. Duke Charles Louis Frederick of Mecklenburg-Strelitz
13. Princess Christiane Emilie of Schwarzburg-Sondershausen
3. Princess Charlotte of Mecklenburg-Strelitz
14. Ernest Frederick I, Duke of Saxe-Hildburghausen
7. Princess Elisabeth Albertine of Saxe-Hildburghausen
15. Countess Sophia Albertine of Erbach-Erbach

== Bibliography ==
- Black, Jeremy (2006). George III: America's Last King. Yale University Press. ISBN 0-300-11732-9.
- Curzon, Catherine (2020). The Elder Sons of George III: Kings, Princes, and a Grand Old Duke. Pen & Sword Books Limited. ISBN 978-1-4738-7250-9.
- Fraser, Flora (2004). Princesses: The Six Daughters of George III. John Murray. ISBN 0-7195-6108-6.
- Hadlow, Janice (2014). A Royal Experiment: The Private Life of King George III. Henry Holt and Company. ISBN 978-0-8050-9656-9.
- Hall, Matthew (2010) [1858]. The Royal Princesses of England: From the Reign of George the First. G. Routledge & Co. ISBN 978-1-146-51884-0.
- Hedley, Olwen (1975). Queen Charlotte. J. Murray. ISBN 0-7195-3104-7.
- Hibbert, Christopher (2000). George III: A Personal History. Basic Books. ISBN 0-465-02724-5.
- Holt, Edward (1820). The Public and Domestic Life of His Late Most Gracious Majesty, George the Third, Volume 1. London: Sherwood, Neely, and Jones. OCLC 765811244.
- Koplow, David A. (2003). Smallpox: The Fight to Eradicate a Global Scourge. Berkeley: University of California Press. ISBN 978-0-520-24220-3.
- Panton, Kenneth J. (2011). Historical Dictionary of the British Monarchy. Scarecrow Press, Inc. ISBN 978-0-8108-5779-7.
- Sheppard, Edgar (1894). Memorials of St. James's Palace, Volume 2. London: Longmans, Green, and Co. OCLC 1166804665.
- von Ammon, Christoph Heinrich (1768). Genealogie ascendante jusqu'au quatrieme degre inclusivement de tous les Rois et Princes de maisons souveraines de l'Europe actuellement vivans [Genealogy up to the fourth degree inclusive of all the Kings and Princes of sovereign houses of Europe currently living] (in French). Bourdeaux: Frederic Guillaume Birnstiel. OCLC 12016472.
- Walpole, Horace; Cunningham, Peter (1891). The Letters of Horace Walpole, Fourth Earl of Orford, Volume VIII. Richard Bentley and Son. OCLC 609155242.
- Watkins, John (1819). Memoirs of Her Most Excellent Majesty Sophia-Charlotte: Queen of Great Britain, Volume 1. Henry Colburn. OCLC 4606736.
- Weir, Alison (2008). Britain's Royal Families, The Complete Genealogy. London: Vintage Books. ISBN 978-0-09-953973-5.
