= Princess Amelia of the United Kingdom =

British princess (1783–1810)

Princess Amelia
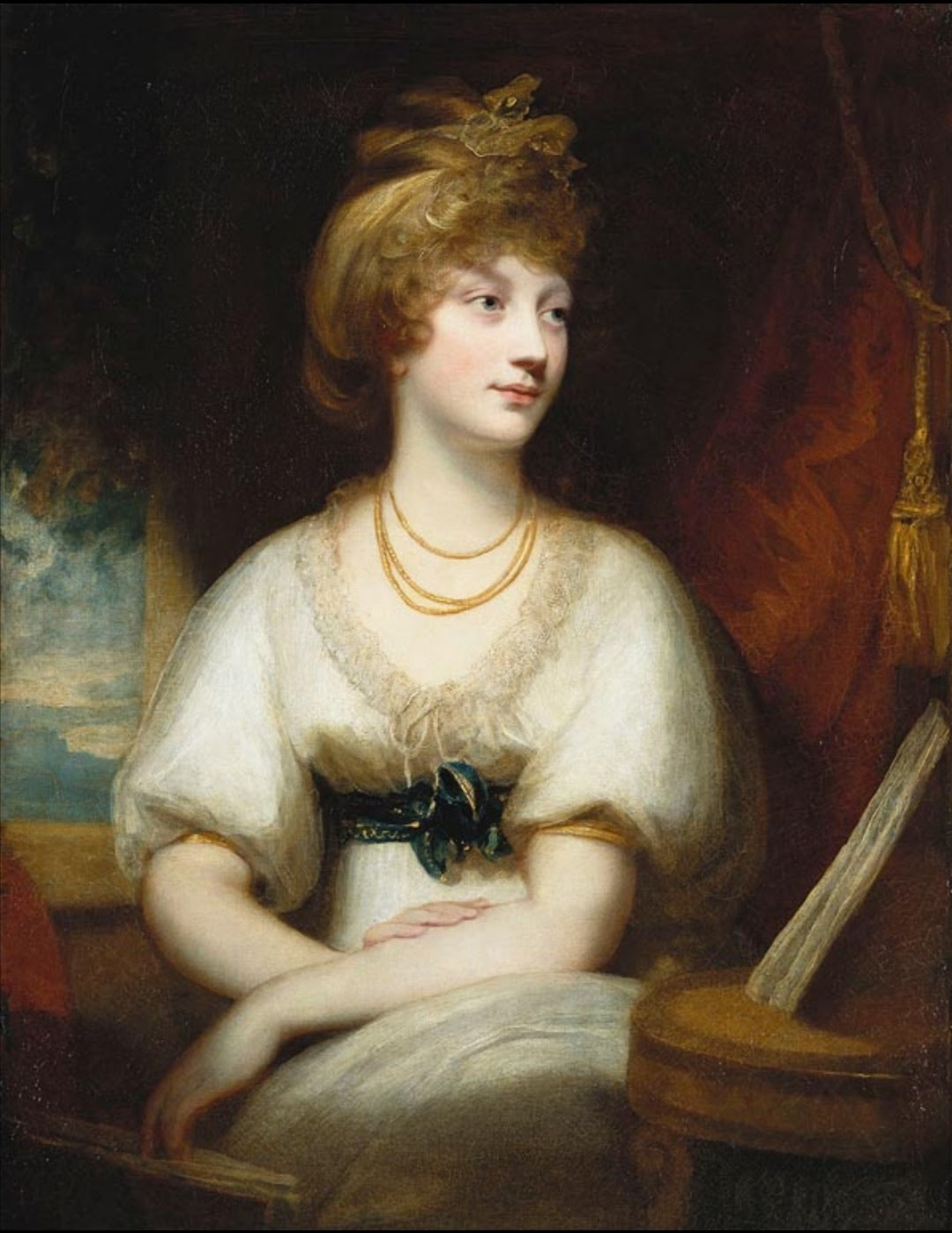
- Portrait by Sir William Beechey, c. 1797
- Born: 7 August 1783; Royal Lodge, Windsor, England
- Died: 2 November 1810 (aged 27); Augusta Lodge, Windsor, England
- Burial: 13 November 1810; Royal Vault, St George's Chapel, Windsor Castle
- House: Hanover
- Father: George III
- Mother: Charlotte of Mecklenburg-Strelitz

Princess Amelia (7 August 1783 – 2 November 1810) was the fifteenth and last child of King George III of the United Kingdom and his wife, Charlotte of Mecklenburg-Strelitz. She was their sixth daughter and she was their third child to predecease them.

== Early life ==
Princess Amelia as an infant in 1785

Amelia was born on 7 August 1783, at Royal Lodge, Windsor, a residence within Windsor Great Park, approximately three miles south of Windsor Castle. The youngest of 15 children born to King George III and Queen Charlotte. It is often said that she was her father's favourite; he affectionately called her "Emily". She was born after the early deaths of her elder brothers Octavius (1779–1783) and Alfred (1780–1782). These deaths left a gap of almost six years between Amelia and her nearest surviving sibling, Princess Sophia. She was twenty-one years younger than her eldest sibling, George, and nearly seventeen years younger than her eldest sister, Charlotte.

Amelia was baptised at the Chapel Royal, St James's Palace, by John Moore, Archbishop of Canterbury, on 17 September 1783. Her godparents were her siblings George, Charlotte, and Augusta Sophia. She was the fifteenth sibling christened there. She was later confirmed by the Archbishop on 24 December 1799.

Coming so soon after the death of Prince Octavius and shortly before the end of the war between Great Britain and the United States, Amelia's birth was felt to be a beginning of a new period of hope, and much was expected of her, even from birth. When Amelia was only a month old, Princess Charlotte wrote to her brother William, "Our littlest sister is without exception one of the prettiest children I have ever seen". She was expected to be as beautiful, charming and winning as Octavius, her father's previous favourite child, had been. As a result of her two brothers' deaths, Amelia was seen as her father's favourite.

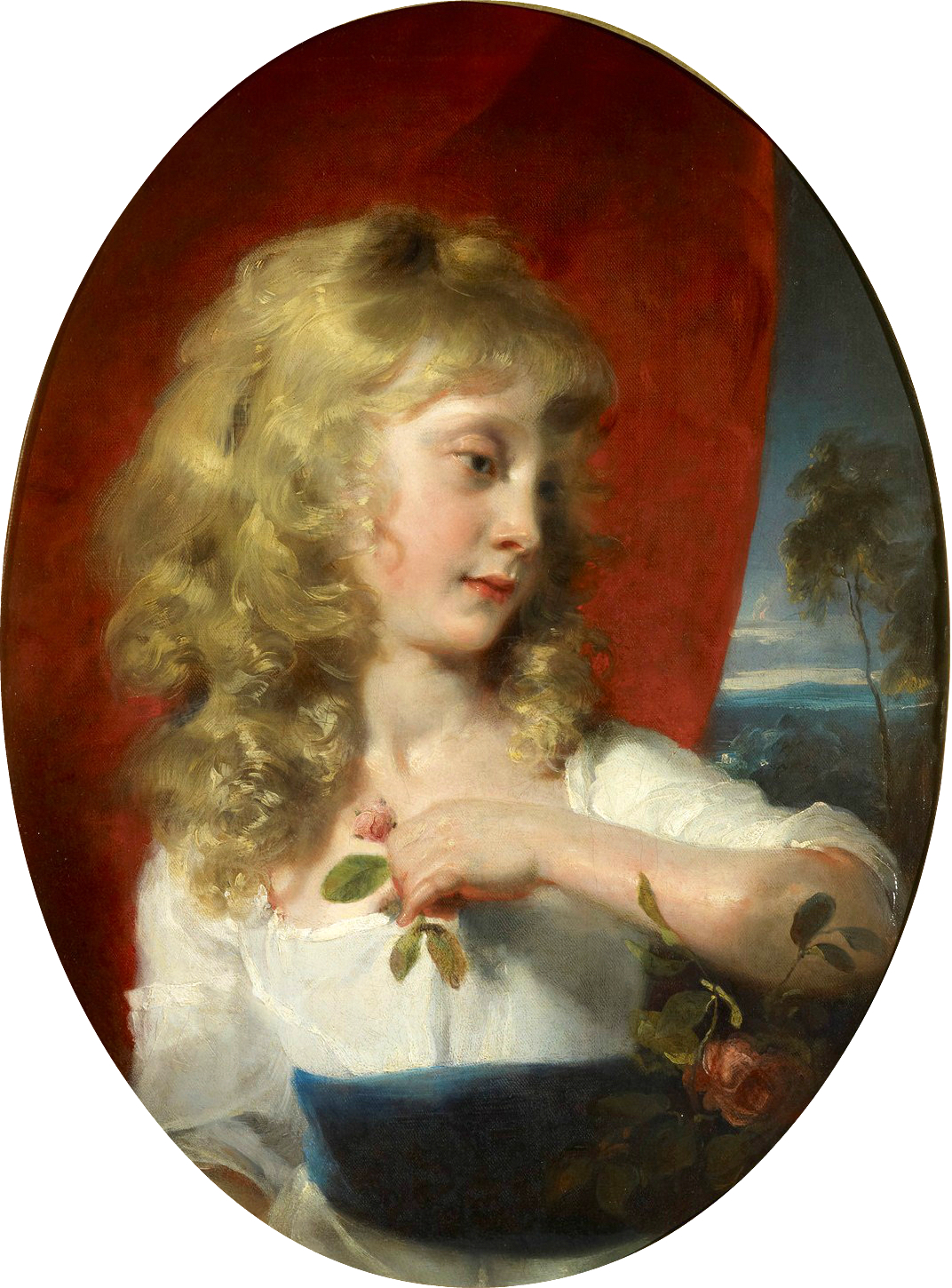
Princess Amelia around the age of five, by Thomas Lawrence, 1789

From an early age, Amelia was conscious of her rank. A popular tale relates that when the famous tragedian Sarah Siddons expressed a desire to kiss the beautiful baby, Amelia "...instantly held her little hand out to be kissed, so early had she learnt the lessons of Royalty." When Amelia was three, Fanny Burney, the Queen's Keeper of the Robes, commented that the princess could be "decorous and dignified when called upon to act en princess to any strangers, as if conscious of her high rank, and the importance of condescendingly sustaining it." Burney even dubbed her "the little idol". As the youngest of the thirteen surviving children, Amelia spent most of her time with her sisters Mary and Sophia, living in various royal residences. From the beginning, the three younger princesses did not receive as much parental attention as their elder sisters had, and spent a good deal of time away from the King and Queen, communicating with them mostly by letter.

It seems that the three youngest princesses were much wilder than their elder sisters, as evidenced by their behaviour when they sat for a portrait in 1785. In 1770, Johan Zoffany had been able to paint the King, the Queen, and their first six children with little difficulty. In 1785, however, John Singleton Copley had so much difficulty getting the dogs, birds, and especially the three royal children to sit still that he never painted another portrait. Compared to the carefully planned education that Charlotte, Augusta, and Elizabeth had been given, the education given to Mary, Sophia, and Amelia was based solely on what had come before. Amelia was only five years old when her father suffered his first bout of madness. As a consequence of her father's declining health, she never experienced the closeness and affection that had characterized the family during her elder sisters' early years.

== Adulthood ==
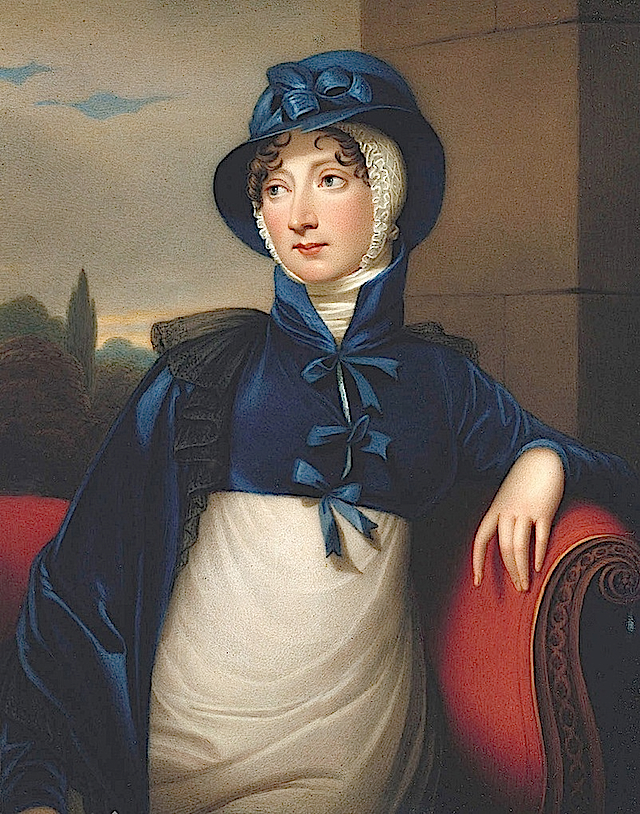
Princess Amelia in 1807

Prior to 1788, King George had told his daughters that he would take them to Hanover and find them suitable husbands despite misgivings he had, which stemmed from his sisters' own unhappy marriages. He remarked, "I cannot deny that I have never wished to see any of them marry: I am happy in their company, and do not in the least want a separation." However, the King suffered his first bout of madness that year, when Amelia was aged five. Further lapses into insanity occurred in 1801 and 1804, thus forestalling talk of marriage for his daughters. The question of matrimony was rarely raised; Queen Charlotte feared that the subject, which had always discomfited the King, would push him back into insanity. Furthermore, the Queen, under strain due to her illness, wanted the princesses to remain close to her.

Amelia and her sisters, Charlotte, Augusta Sophia, Elizabeth, Mary and Sophia were over-protected and isolated, which restricted meeting eligible suitors of their own age.

=== Illness and death ===
In 1798, Amelia developed a pain in the joint of her knee and was sent to the large seaside town of Worthing for recovery. She wrote to her father, "Certainly the vapour and warm sea bath are of use and therefore I hope that I shall be able to assure you that I am better." The following year, Amelia temporarily recovered enough to join her family at Weymouth, where she doted upon her 3 year-old niece Princess Charlotte of Wales. Throughout her life, Amelia was often in poor health; at the age of fifteen, she started to suffer the early symptoms of what turned out to be tuberculosis.

In 1801, the princess was sent for a seaside cure at Weymouth to improve her health. Among those staying with her was the Hon. Charles FitzRoy, an equerry 21 years older than she, and the son of Charles FitzRoy, 1st Baron Southampton. Amelia fell in love with the equerry and wanted to marry him. The Queen was told of the affair by a servant but turned a blind eye. It was hoped that such discretion would prevent the King from discovering the liaison, which may have risked sending him into one of the bouts of mental illness to which he was becoming increasingly prone. Though she never gave up hope of marrying him, Amelia knew she could not legally marry FitzRoy due to the provisions of the Royal Marriages Act passed by her father's Parliament (at least until she reached the age of 25, after which she could receive permission by the assent of the Privy Council). She would later tell her brother Frederick that she considered herself to be married, taking the initials A. F. R. (Amelia FitzRoy).

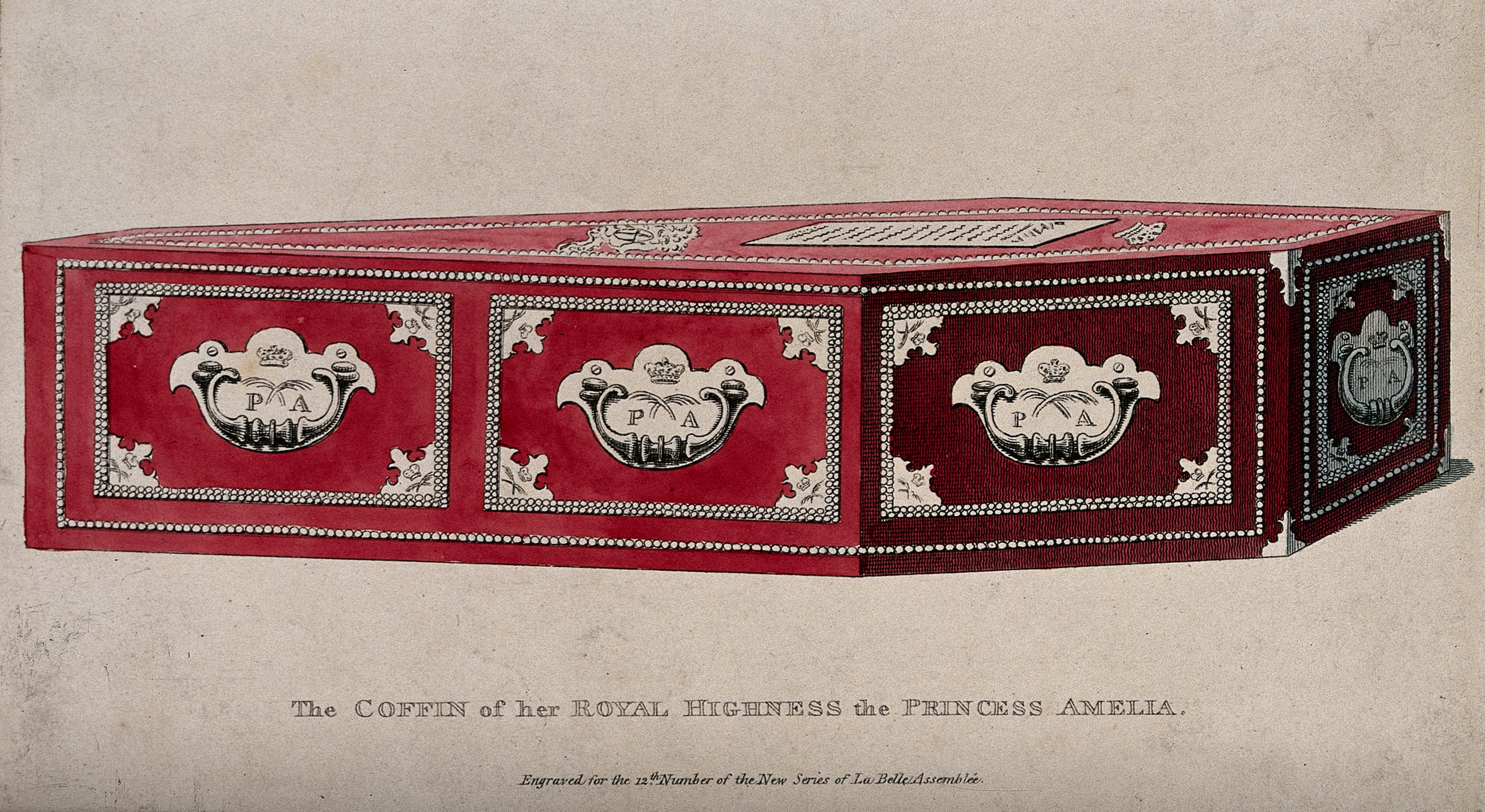
The coffin of Princess Amelia

In 1808, Amelia had a severe attack of measles and the depressing atmosphere at home with her mother in Windsor made her even more miserable. The anxious King George decided to send Amelia to Weymouth, accompanied by her sister Mary. Her health was improved only a little, but she found comfort in quietly resting. In 1809, she could occasionally take short walks in the garden. This improvement was temporary, and in August 1810 her sufferings grew sharper, while in October of that year she was seized with St. Anthony's fire (erysipelas), which cut off all hope and confined her to her bed on the 25th. The king summoned his daughter's physicians to him at seven o'clock every morning and three or four other times during the day, questioning them minutely as to her condition. She lingered a few days more, waited upon to the last by her favourite and devoted sister, Mary. Her death occurred at 12:00pm on 2 November, her brother Edward's 43rd birthday.

The dying princess had a mourning ring made for the King, composed of a lock of her hair under crystal set round with diamonds. He purportedly burst into tears upon receiving it. Otherwise, her will dictated all her possessions be given to Charles FitzRoy. Amelia was buried in the Royal Vault in St George's Chapel, Windsor.

== Aftermath ==
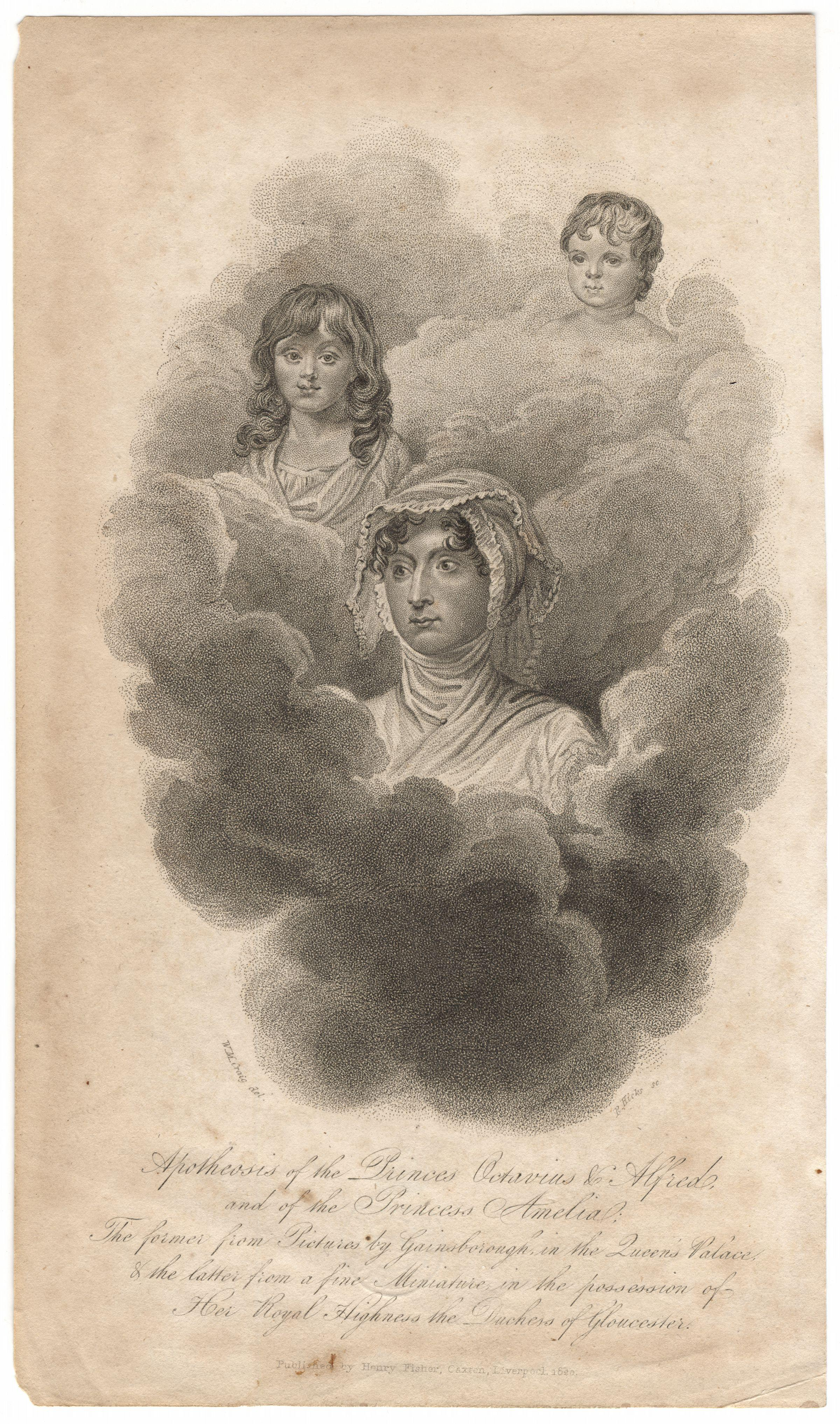
1820 print depicting the apotheosis of Amelia with her brothers Octavius and Alfred

After Amelia's death, George Villiers, the King's bailiff, and younger brother of Thomas Villiers, 2nd Earl of Clarendon, attempted to blackmail the King and Queen with letters belonging to Amelia, after the disappearance of £280,000 in his control. Villiers was father of later diplomat and statesman George Villiers, 4th Earl of Clarendon.

Her death is credited with contributing to the decline in her father's health which resulted in his insanity and the subsequent invocation of the Regency Act 1811. According to his physician, Dr. Willis, the king would later cry "in a wild, monotonous, delirious way, 'Oh Emily [Princess Amelia], why won't you save your father? I hate all the physicians..." Another of King George's delusions included the belief that a healthy Amelia was only staying in Hanover with a large family of her own, where she would "never grow older and always be well."

Amelia has been described as a beautiful girl with ruby lips and auburn hair. Reportedly she was the "most turbulent and tempestuous of all the Princesses". However, she is also said to have been amiable, spirited, unselfish and intelligent. These qualities led her sister-in-law Princess Caroline, who was known to despise her in-laws, to call Amelia the "most amiable of the bunch". Amelia was a favourite of both the Prince of Wales and the Duke of Sussex, who called her a "lovely creature". Amelia adored the former and once told him that she had always loved him better than her other brothers. He for his part loved her perhaps more than he did his other sisters (with the possible exception of Princess Mary) and was devastated when she died. So deeply affected was he by her death that after her funeral, he could never again sleep in a room that was not lit by several wax candles. He also burst into tears at the mention of her name more than three years after her demise.

Ameliasburgh, Ontario, is named after Princess Amelia.

== Arms ==
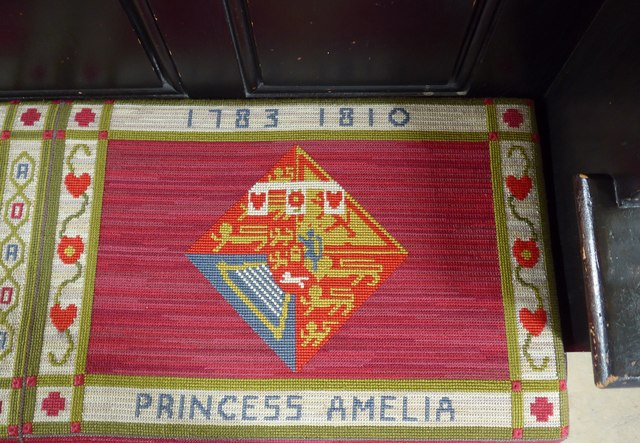
Arms of Princess Amelia, on a cushion in St Anne's Church, Kew

As of 1789, as a daughter of the sovereign, Amelia had use of the arms of the kingdom, differenced by a label argent of three points, the centre point bearing a rose gules, the outer points each bearing a heart gules.

== Ancestors ==
Ancestors of Princess Amelia of the United Kingdom

8. George II of Great Britain
4. Frederick, Prince of Wales
9. Princess Caroline of Brandenburg-Ansbach
2. George III of the United Kingdom
10. Frederick II, Duke of Saxe-Gotha-Altenburg
5. Princess Augusta of Saxe-Gotha
11. Princess Magdalena Augusta of Anhalt-Zerbst
1. Princess Amelia of the United Kingdom
12. Adolphus Frederick II, Duke of Mecklenburg-Strelitz
6. Duke Charles Louis Frederick of Mecklenburg-Strelitz
13. Princess Christiane Emilie of Schwarzburg-Sondershausen
3. Princess Charlotte of Mecklenburg-Strelitz
14. Ernest Frederick I, Duke of Saxe-Hildburghausen
7. Princess Elisabeth Albertine of Saxe-Hildburghausen
15. Countess Sophia Albertine of Erbach-Erbach

== See also ==
- British royal family
- Descendants of George III
