= Princess Mary, Duchess of Gloucester and Edinburgh =

British princess (1776–1857)

Princess Mary
- Duchess of Gloucester and Edinburgh
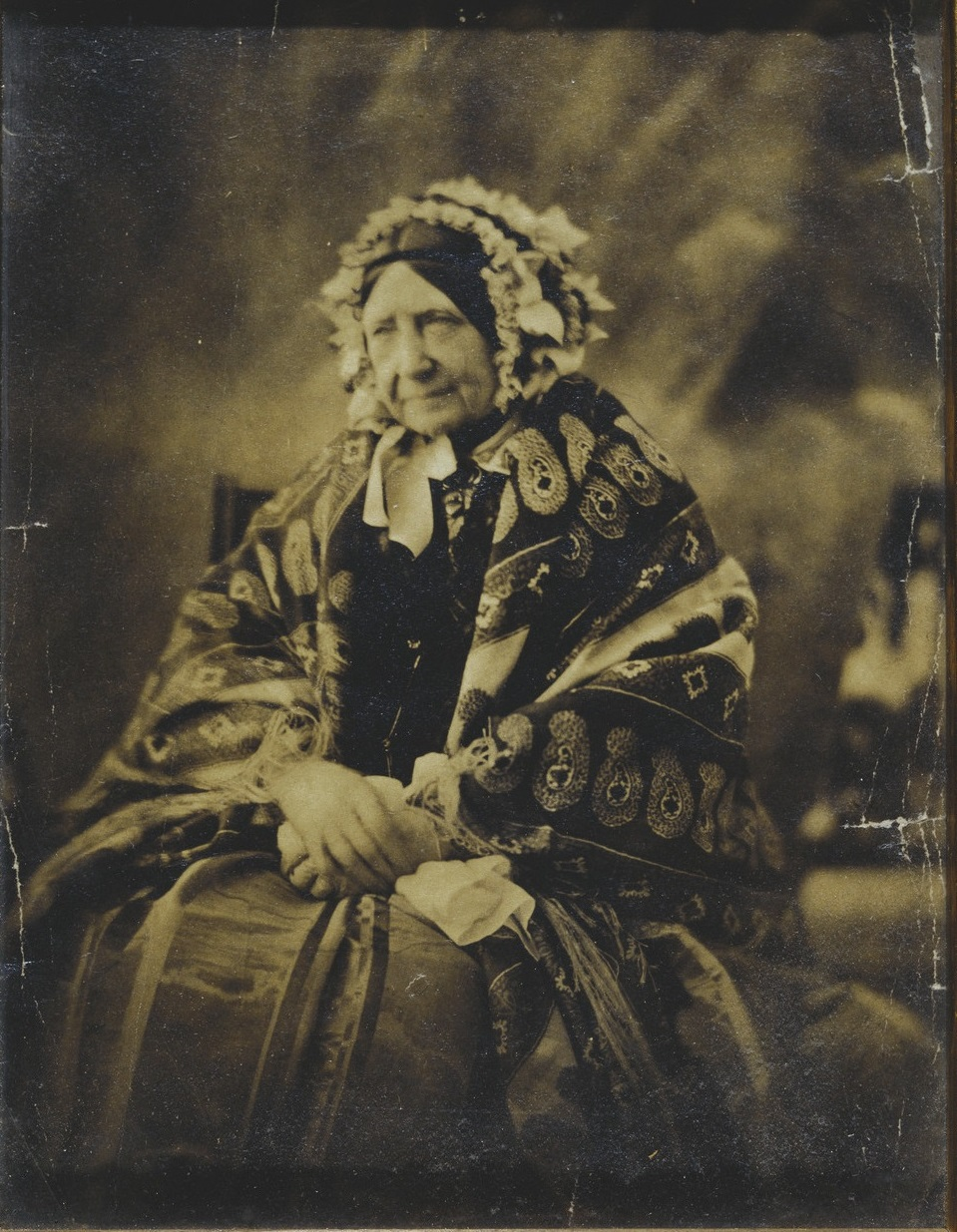
- Portrait by Antoine Claudet, c. 1856
- Born: 25 April 1776; Buckingham House, London, England
- Died: 30 April 1857 (aged 81); Gloucester House, Mayfair, London, England
- Burial: 8 May 1857; St George's Chapel, Windsor Castle
- Spouse: Prince William Frederick, Duke of Gloucester and Edinburgh (m. 1816; died 1834)
- House: Hanover
- Father: George III
- Mother: Charlotte of Mecklenburg-Strelitz

Princess Mary, Duchess of Gloucester and Edinburgh (25 April 1776 – 30 April 1857) was the eleventh child and fourth daughter of King George III and his consort Charlotte of Mecklenburg-Strelitz.

She married her first cousin, Prince William Frederick, Duke of Gloucester and Edinburgh, when both were 40, and was his widow in later life. In her last years, her niece Queen Victoria was on the throne as the fourth monarch during Mary's life, after her father and two of her brothers, George IV and William IV. Dying aged 81 at Gloucester House, Weymouth, Mary was the longest-lived and last survivor of George III's fifteen children (thirteen of whom lived to adulthood).

== Early life and family ==
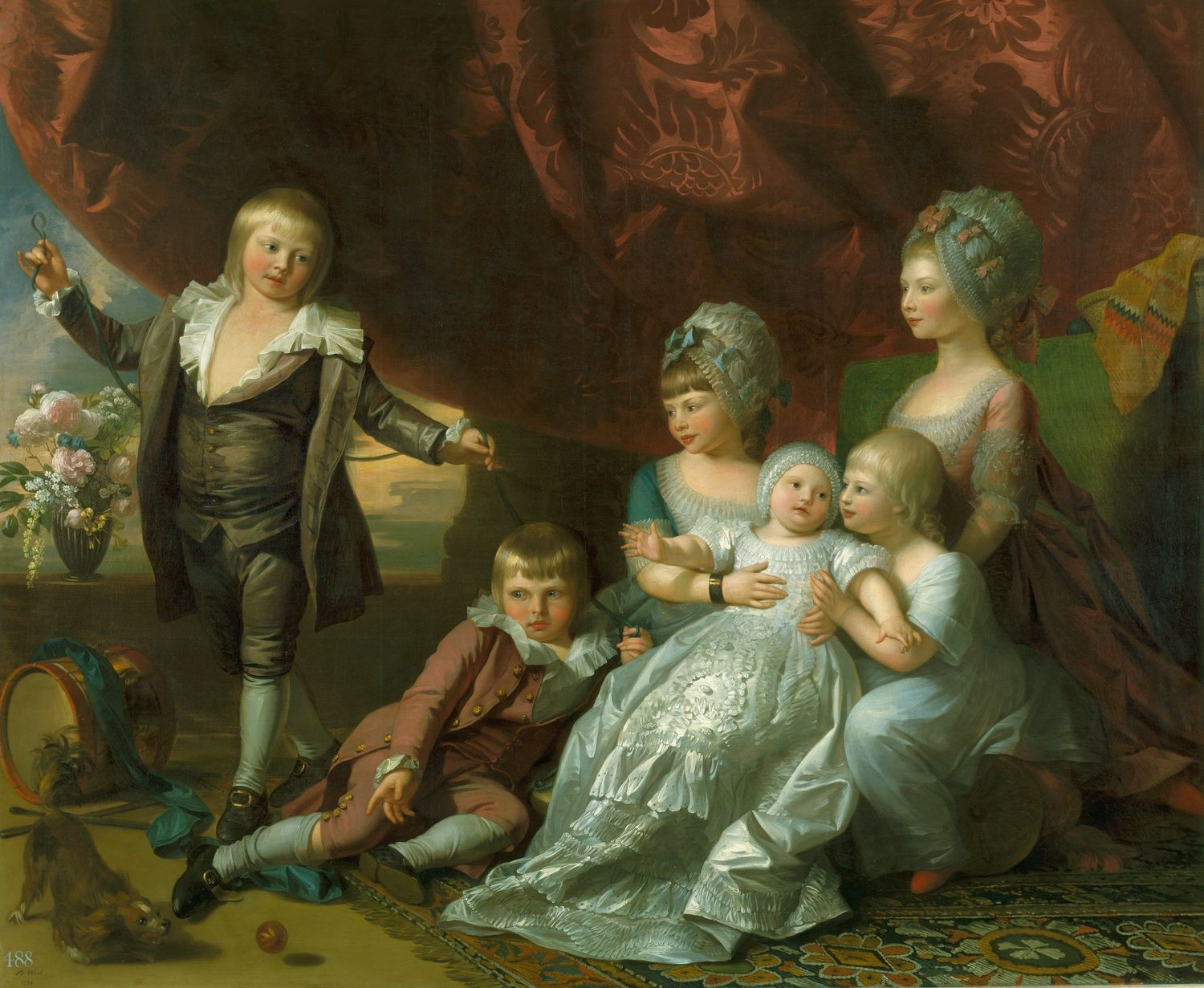
Mary as an infant with her elder siblings (Augusta, Elizabeth, Ernest, Augustus, and Adolphus) in 1776, by Benjamin West

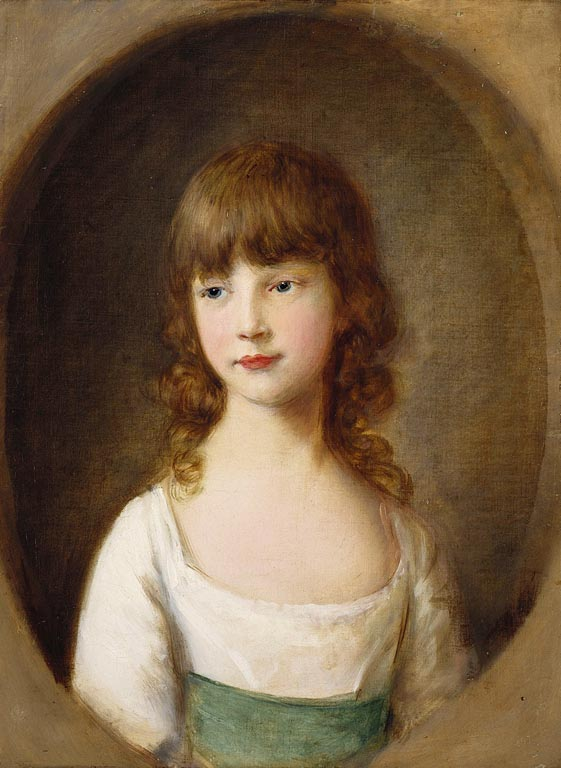
Princess Mary painted by Thomas Gainsborough in 1782

Mary was born on 25 April 1776, at Buckingham Palace, London. Her father was the reigning British monarch, George III. Her mother was Queen Charlotte, the daughter of Charles, reigning Duke of Mecklenburg-Strelitz.

Mary was baptised on 19 May 1776, in the Great Council Chamber at St. James's Palace, by Frederick Cornwallis, the Archbishop of Canterbury. Her godparents were:

- Landgrave Frederick of Hesse-Cassel (her first cousin once-removed, for whom the Earl of Hertford, Lord Chamberlain stood proxy)
- The Duchess of Saxe-Gotha-Altenburg (wife of her first cousin once-removed, for whom the Duchess of Argyll, Lady of the Bedchamber to the Queen, was proxy)
- Princess Charles of Mecklenburg-Strelitz (her third cousin once-removed, for whom the Dowager Countess of Effingham, Lady of the Bedchamber to the Queen, stood proxy).

The king was a devoted father, finding time to regularly visit the royal nursery. Engaging in active play with his young children, he behaved quite informally in contrast to the dignified Queen Charlotte, who had more difficulty abandoning the formal behaviour expected of their class. Despite her outer reserve, however, Charlotte took a role as conscientious as her husband in their children's upbringing. For the royal princesses, the queen carefully oversaw their welfare, education, and development of moral values. Faced with less time due to her public duties and close marriage to the king, she appointed Lady Charlotte Finch to manage the royal nursery and administer her ideas.

According to Flora Fraser, Mary was considered to be the most beautiful daughter of George III; Fraser calls her a "bland beauty". Mary danced a minuet for the first time in public at the age of sixteen in June 1791, during a court ball given for the king's birthday. In the spring of 1792 she made her official debut at court. Around 1796 Mary fell in love with the Dutch Prince Frederick, while he and his family lived in exile in London. Frederik was a son of William V, Prince of Orange, the Dutch stadholder, and younger brother to the future King William I of the Netherlands. However Frederik and Mary never married because George III stipulated that her elder sisters should marry first. In 1799 Prince Frederik died of an infection while serving in the army, and Mary was allowed to go into official mourning.

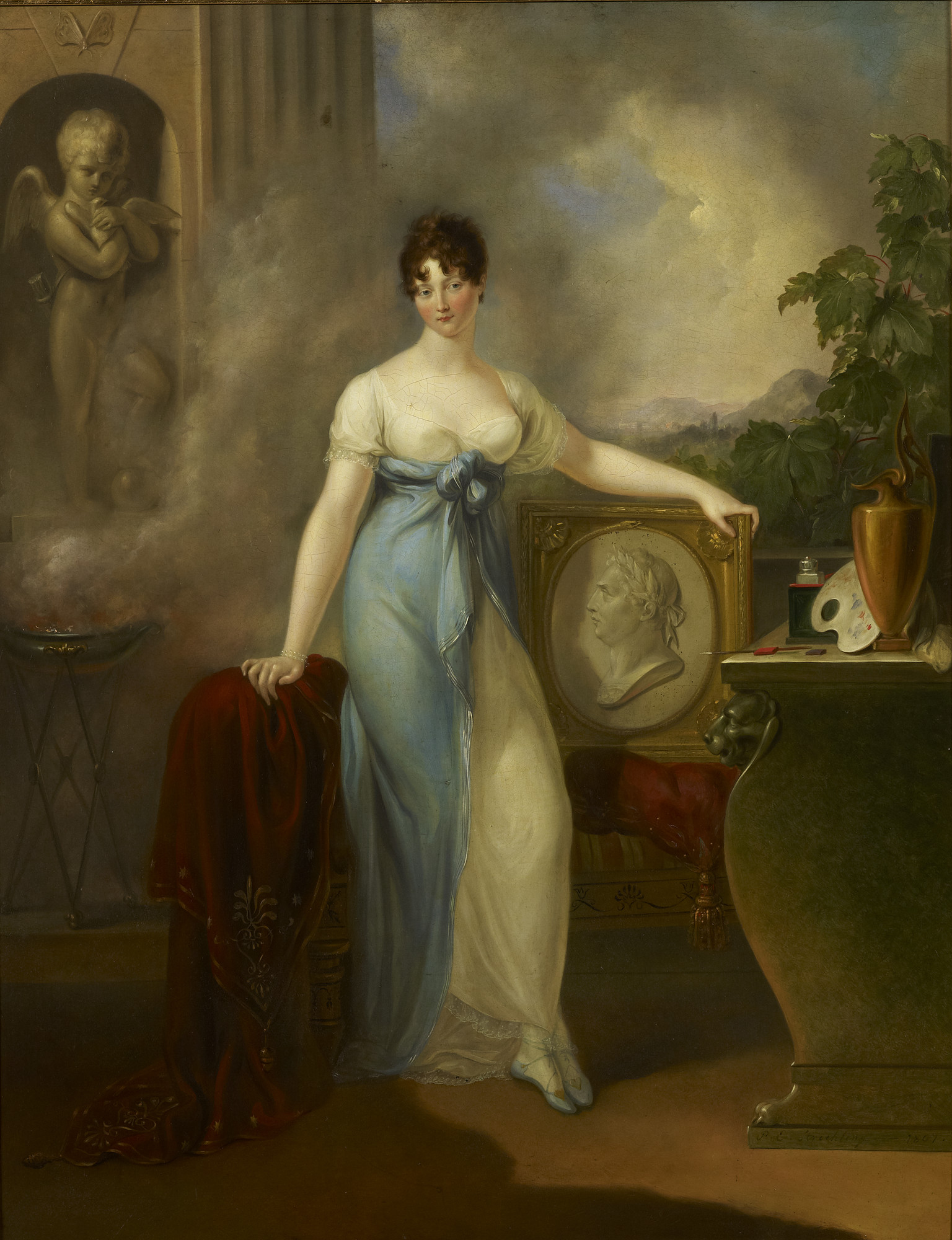
Portrait by Peter Edward Stroehling, 1807

Mary's youngest sister and beloved companion Princess Amelia called her "Mama's tool" because of her obedient nature. Amelia's premature death in 1810 devastated her sister, who had nursed her devotedly during her painful illness.

Mary was quite close to her eldest brother, and she shared his antipathy toward his wife, their cousin Caroline of Brunswick. When the latter left for Italy, Mary congratulated her brother "on the prospect of a good riddance. Heaven grant that she may not return again and that we may never see more of her."

== Marriage and later life ==
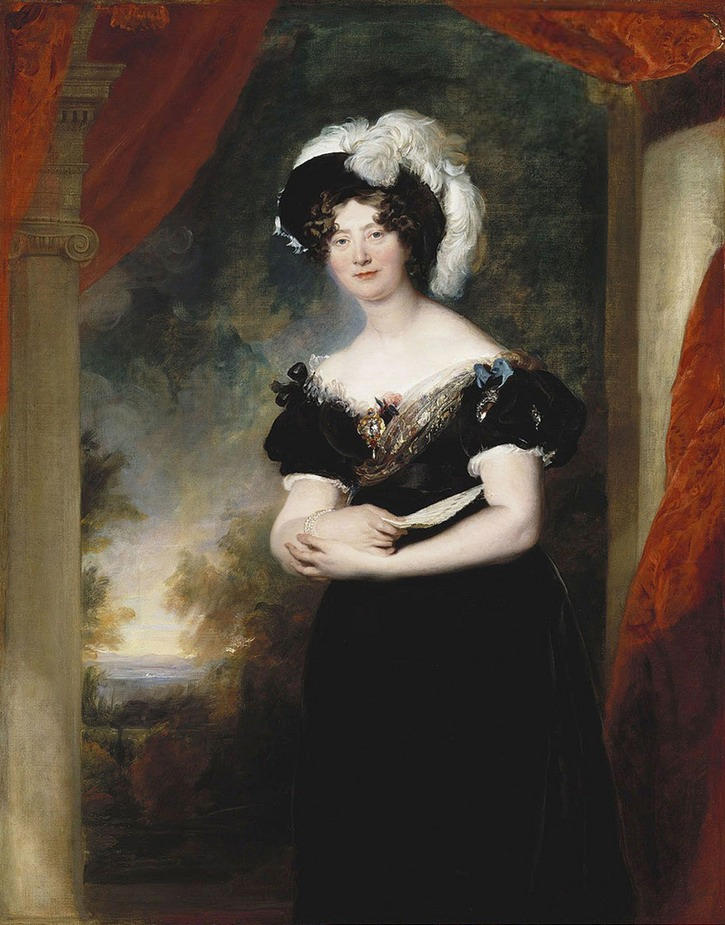
Portrait by Thomas Lawrence, a counterpart to his portrait of her sister, 1824

Mary's upbringing was very sheltered and she spent most of her time with her parents and sisters. King George and Queen Charlotte were keen to shelter their children, particularly the girls. Mary, however, married on 22 July 1816, to her first cousin, Prince William Frederick, Duke of Gloucester and Edinburgh, the son of George III's brother, Prince William Henry, Duke of Gloucester and Edinburgh. Both were aged 40. On their wedding day, Mary's brother, the Prince Regent, raised the bridegroom's style from Highness to Royal Highness, an attribute to which Mary's rank as daughter of the King already entitled her.

William Frederick had initially sought to marry Mary's niece Princess Charlotte of Wales. Charlotte, while interested, was berated by her father, who subsequently also expressed his displeasure to Gloucester and the courtship ended. The historian A. W. Purdue suggests that Mary's motive for marrying her cousin sprang from her dislike of Queen Charlotte's restrictive household. Charlotte observed that the duke "is much in love, & and tells me he is the happiest creature on earth. I won't say [Mary] does as much, but being her own mistress, having her own house, & being able to walk in the streets all delights her in their several ways."

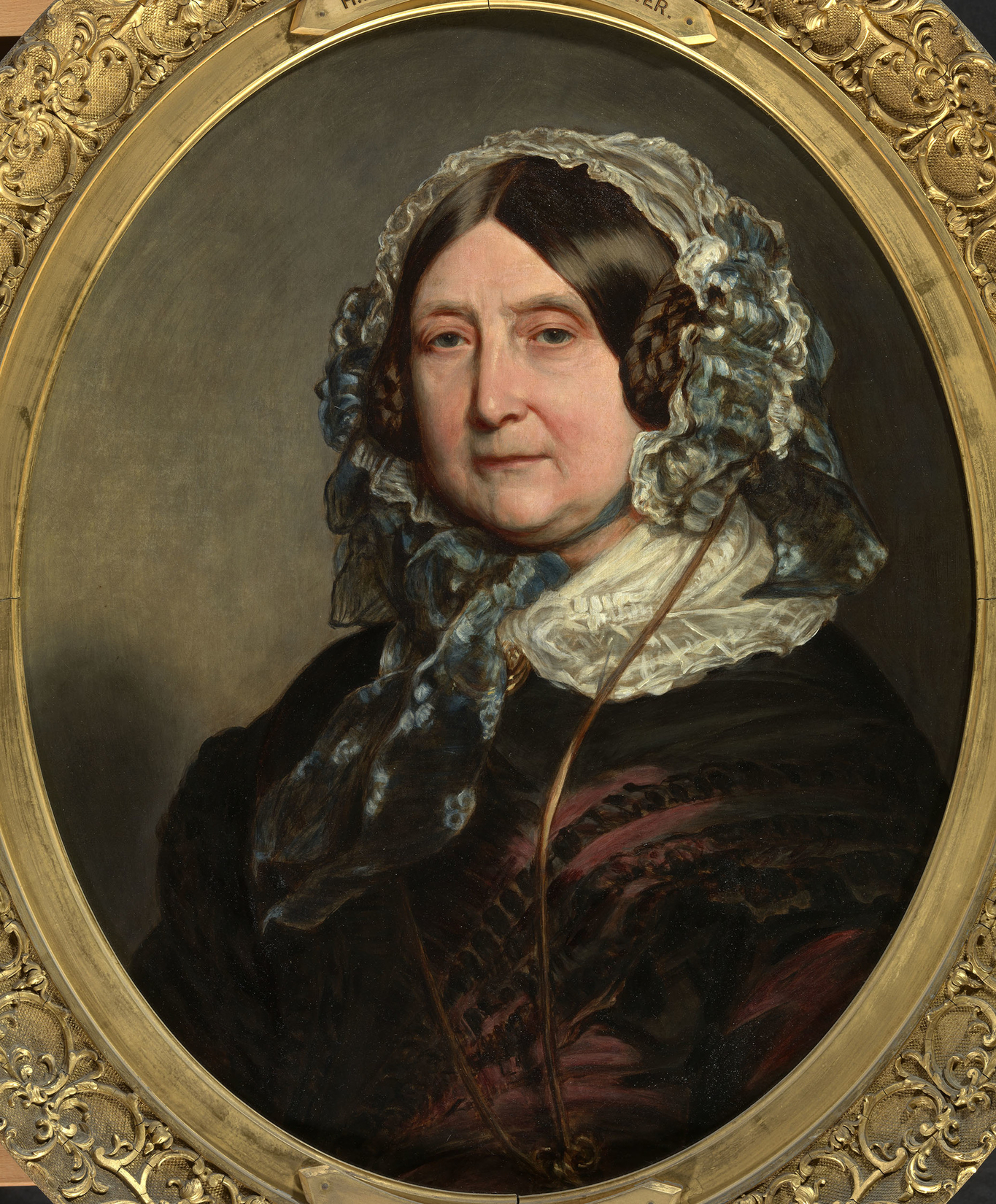
Portrait by William Corden the Younger, after Franz Xaver Winterhalter, 1856–57

The couple lived at Bagshot Park, but after William's death she moved to White Lodge in Richmond Park. They had no children together.

== Death ==
Mary died on 30 April 1857 at Gloucester House, Mayfair, aged 81. She was the last-surviving and longest-lived child of King George III and Queen Charlotte.

== Arms ==
Arms of the Duchess of Gloucester and Edinburgh on a kneeler in St Anne's Church, Kew

As of 1789, as a daughter of the sovereign, Mary had use of the arms of the kingdom, differenced by a label argent of three points, the centre point bearing a rose gules, the outer points each bearing a canton gules.

== Ancestry ==
Ancestors of Princess Mary, Duchess of Gloucester and Edinburgh

8. George II of Great Britain
4. Frederick, Prince of Wales
9. Princess Caroline of Brandenburg-Ansbach
2. George III of the United Kingdom
10. Frederick II, Duke of Saxe-Gotha-Altenburg
5. Princess Augusta of Saxe-Gotha
11. Princess Magdalena Augusta of Anhalt-Zerbst
1. Princess Mary, Duchess of Gloucester and Edinburgh
12. Adolphus Frederick II, Duke of Mecklenburg-Strelitz
6. Duke Charles Louis Frederick of Mecklenburg-Strelitz
13. Princess Christiane Emilie of Schwarzburg-Sondershausen
3. Princess Charlotte of Mecklenburg-Strelitz
14. Ernest Frederick I, Duke of Saxe-Hildburghausen
7. Princess Elisabeth Albertine of Saxe-Hildburghausen
15. Countess Sophia Albertine of Erbach-Erbach

== See also ==
- List of British princesses
