= Princess Augusta Sophia of the United Kingdom =

British princess (1768–1840)

Princess Augusta Sophia
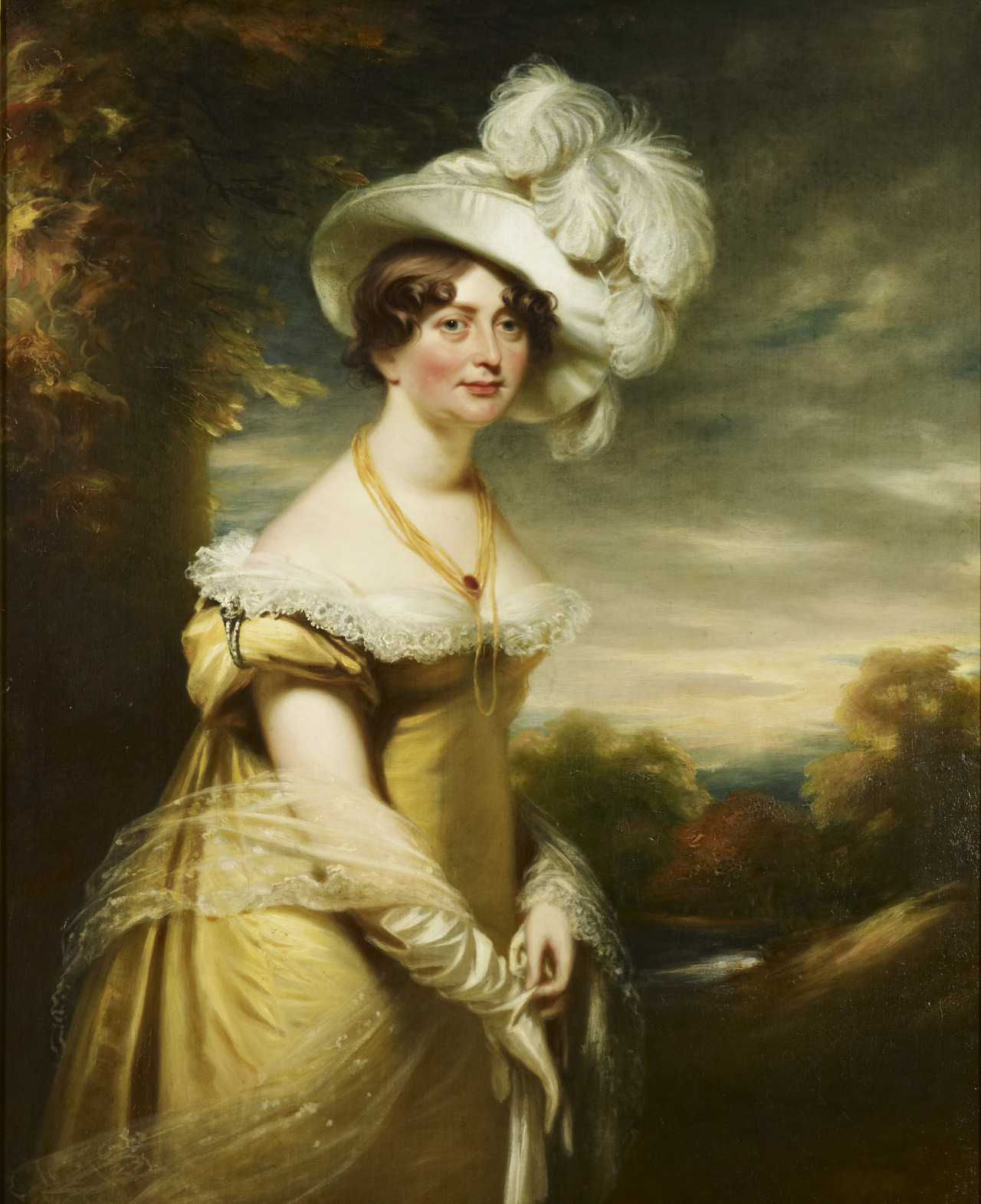
- Portrait by William Beechey
- Born: 8 November 1768; Buckingham House, London, England
- Died: 22 September 1840 (aged 71); Clarence House, London, England
- Burial: 2 October 1840; Royal Vault, St George's Chapel, Windsor Castle
- House: Hanover
- Father: George III
- Mother: Charlotte of Mecklenburg-Strelitz

Princess Augusta Sophia (8 November 1768 – 22 September 1840) was the sixth child and second daughter of King George III and Queen Charlotte.

== Childhood and adolescence ==
A portrait of King George III, Queen Charlotte, and their six eldest children in 1770. Augusta is the infant in her mother's arms.

Augusta was born at Buckingham House, City and Liberty of Westminster, on 8 November 1768. She was the sixth child and second daughter of George III (1738–1820) and his wife Queen Charlotte. Her father so dearly wanted the new baby to be a girl that the doctor presiding over the labour thought fit to protest that "whoever sees those lovely Princes above stairs must be glad to have another." The King was so upset by this view he replied that "whoever sees that lovely child the Princess Royal above stairs must wish to have the fellow to her." To the King's delight, and the Queen's relief, the baby was a small and pretty girl.

The newborn princess was christened on 6 December 1768, by Frederick Cornwallis, the Archbishop of Canterbury, in the Great Council Chamber at St. James's Palace. Her godparents were Prince Charles of Mecklenburg (her maternal uncle, who was visiting England), the Queen of Denmark (her paternal aunt, for whom the Duchess of Ancaster and Kesteven, Mistress of the Robes to Queen Charlotte, stood proxy) and the Hereditary Duchess of Brunswick-Lüneburg (her paternal aunt, for whom the Duchess of Northumberland, Lady of the Bedchamber to the Queen, stood proxy). Lady Mary Coke once declared the month-old Augusta to be "the most beautiful infant I ever saw".

Augusta was the middle sister of the elder trio of princesses that consisted of her, her older sister Charlotte (born 1766) and her younger sister Elizabeth (born 1770). In 1771, the two elder princesses began travelling to Kew to attend lessons under the supervision of Lady Charlotte Finch and Miss Frederica Planta. The princesses, who had formerly been very close to their brothers now saw very little of them, except for when their paths crossed on daily walks. In 1774, Martha Goldsworthy, or "Gouly" became the new head of their education. The princesses learned typically feminine pursuits, such as deportment, music, dancing, and arts, but their mother also ensured that they learned English, French, German and geography, and had exceptionally well-educated governesses.

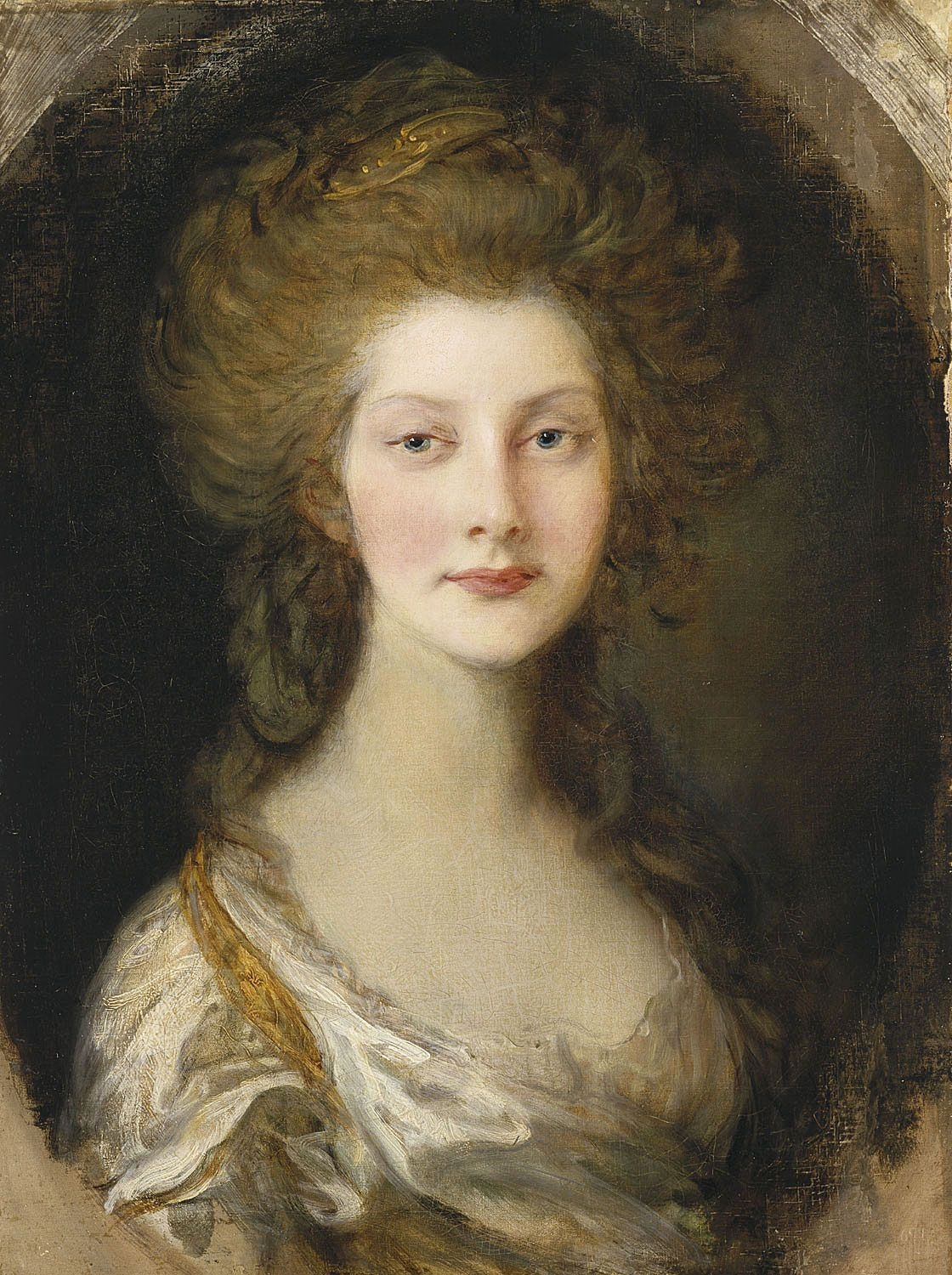
Princess Augusta, aged thirteen.

The young Augusta was a great favourite of Miss Planta, who called her "the handsomest of all the Princesses" though compared to her older sister, she was considered "childish". However, the princess's personality was painfully shy, she stammered when in front of people she did not know. From an early age, Augusta was fixed on being good and was often upset when she did not succeed. Her behaviour veered in between troublesome and well-mannered. She sometimes threw tantrums and hit her governesses, though she also often had a calm disposition and family-minded ways. She strongly disliked the political tensions that by 1780 had sprung up between her elder brothers and their parents, and preferred to occupy herself with her coin collection. As all her sisters were, Augusta was sheltered from the outside world so much that her only friends were her attendants, with whom she kept up a frequent correspondence.

In 1782, Augusta had her debut into society at the King's birthday celebrations. As she was still terrified of crowds, her mother didn't plan to tell her daughter about her debut until two days before it happened. Later that year, the Princess's youngest brother, Alfred, died, followed eight months later by her next youngest brother, Octavius. When the princesses went to see the summer exhibition in 1783 at the Royal Academy, they were made so distraught by the portraits of their two youngest brothers that they broke down and cried in front of everyone. In August 1783 came the birth of Augusta's youngest sibling, Amelia. She stood as a godmother, along with Charlotte and George. Although the birth of her sister did not erase the pain she felt at losing her brothers, Augusta did not dwell on their deaths as her father did.

By the time they reached their teenage years, the three eldest princesses were spending a great deal of time with their parents. They accompanied them to the theatre, to the Opera, and to Court, and their once academic lessons began to wind down, with music and the arts becoming the new focus. They heard famous actresses such as Sarah Siddons read, and along with Charlotte and their parents, Augusta met John Adams when he was presented to the Queen. The three girls were always dressed alike at public functions, the only difference ever in their dresses being colour. Though so often displayed in public, Augusta still was happiest at home, where she adored her younger brothers Ernest, Augustus, and Adolphus. She was also extremely close to her sister Elizabeth, as Charlotte was often haughty and overly conscious of her position as Princess Royal.

== Early adulthood ==
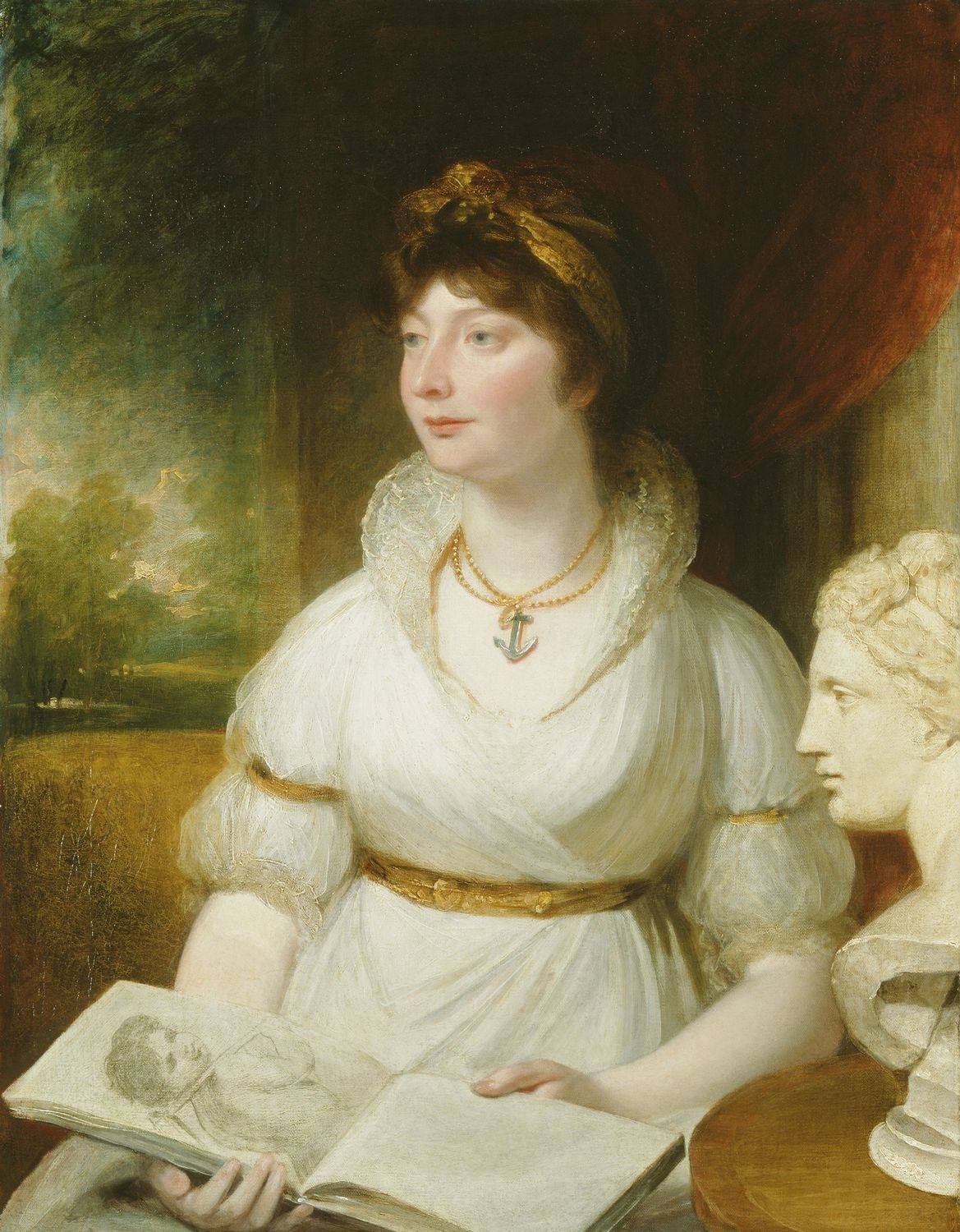
Princess Augusta Sophia, by William Beechey, c. 1797

Since they were quickly approaching a marriageable age, Augusta and the Princess Royal were given their first lady-in-waiting in July 1783. Augusta frequently wrote to her elder brother William, who was in Hanover for military training. She was a good correspondent, telling him family news and encouraging him to tell her what was happening in his life. She revelled in his attention and in the little gifts he sent her, even though the Queen tried to discourage William from taking up his sister's valuable time. Though their academic lessons were nearly over, the Queen was loath to have her daughters waste time, and made sure that the Princesses spent hours studying music or art, learning many types of speciality work from different masters.

The princesses did not "dress" until dinner, wearing morning gowns nearly all day. Even when "dressed", the Royal family often wore plain clothes, far removed from the ornate splendour of other courts. As there were six princesses, the Queen's expenses even for these clothes were enormous, and she tried to keep costs down and within the allowance she was given. Moving into this new phase of life meant that the amount of money the Queen was spending on her three eldest daughters was rapidly increasing. The Princesses constantly needed dresses, hats, trimmings, fans, and other items. The quarterly expense for their clothes was estimated to be £2000, and the expense of all their servants and tutors added to that. Yet there was one benefit: the Princesses were quickly becoming a familiar sight to the public. When their group portrait was exhibited to the people, it was marvelled at for the porcelain impersonal beauty they displayed. They were dressed the same, and only their accessories hinted at the very different personalities that lay underneath the painted masks.

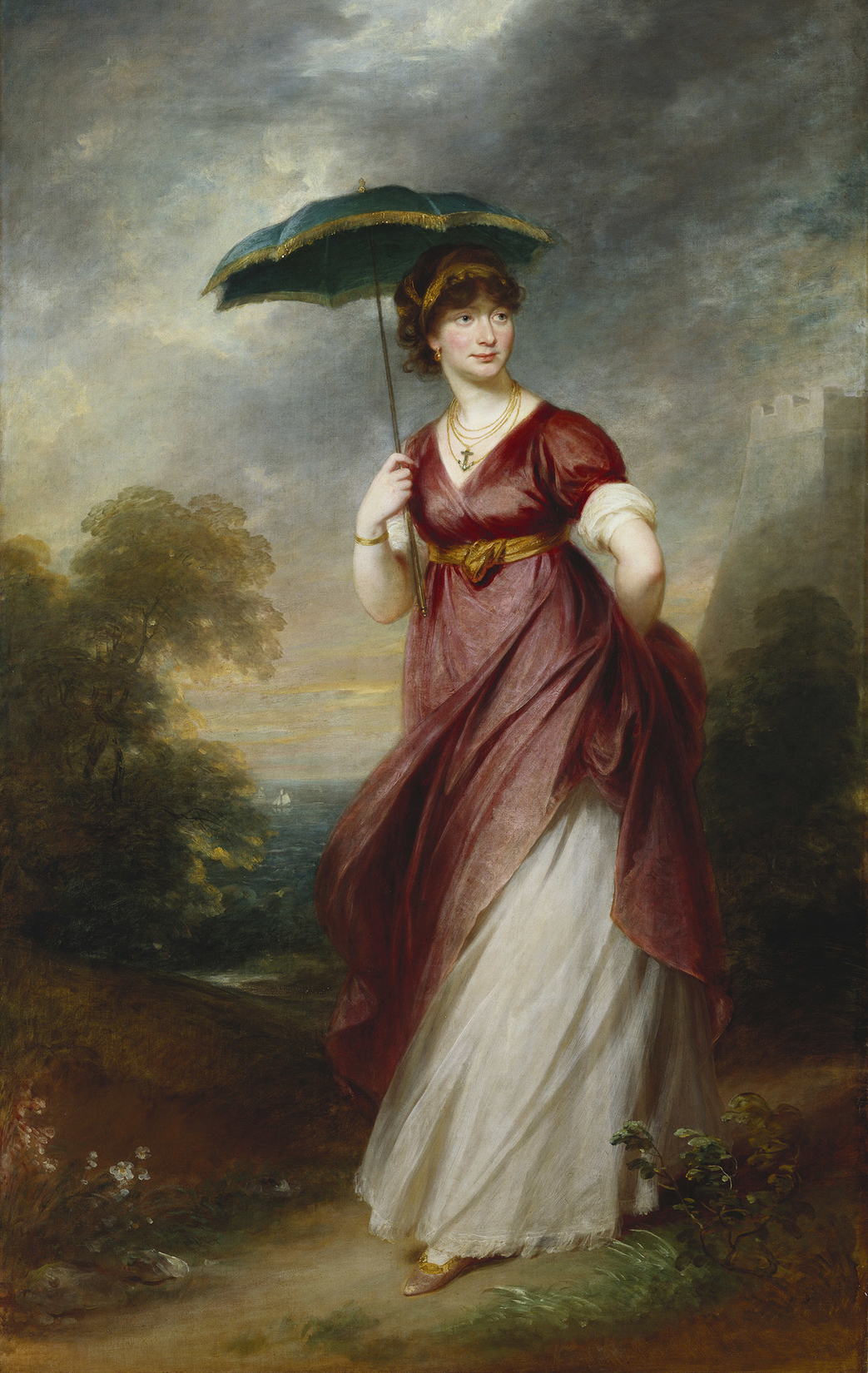
Princess Sophia Augusta at the age of 34, by William Beechey, c. 1802

By 1785, Augusta and Charlotte were reaching an age where they could be considered as potential brides for foreign princes. In that year the Crown Prince of Denmark (later King Frederick VI) indicated to King George III that he would break off every other discussed proposal for the hand in marriage of a British princess. He was also supposed to prefer Augusta to her older sister. However, the King declared that after the treatment of his younger sister by the Crown Prince's father, King Christian VII, he would never send one of his daughters to the Danish court. As their friends and ladies of the court began to get married, the princesses wondered when their turn would come. In 1797, Augusta received a proposal from Prince Frederick Adolf of Sweden, a proposal given without the approval of the Swedish royal house. A British princess, especially from so fertile a mother, was a prize, but Augusta's father seemed increasingly unwilling to allow his daughters to marry.

== Relationship with Brent Spencer ==
Largely denied access to personal relationships with men of their own rank, several of the daughters of George III embarked on such romances with gentlemen at court. Augusta Sophia first met Sir Brent Spencer, a senior Anglo-Irish officer in the British Army, around 1800. As she wrote to her brother, the future King George IV, then Prince Regent, in 1812, the two had entered into an understanding around 1803, while Spencer was stationed in England. In 1805, he was appointed as an equerry to the king. The couple conducted their romance with the utmost privacy, and Augusta asked the Prince Regent in 1812 to consent to her marrying Spencer, promising further discretion in their behaviour.

While no record of a marriage between the two exists, it was noted at the court of Hesse-Homburg at the time of her sister Elizabeth's marriage in 1818 that Augusta was "privately married." It was Spencer who informed Augusta of her mother's death later that year, and Spencer was said to be holding a locket with Augusta's picture when he died in 1828.

== Later life ==
According to a flyer held by the V&A Archives, Augusta was a patron of L. Bertolotto's flea circus.

In 1828 Augusta was heard to remark to a friend: “I was ashamed to hear myself called Princess Augusta, and never could persuade myself that I was so, as long as any of the Stuart family were alive; but after the death of Cardinal York [in 1807], I felt myself to be really Princess Augusta”.

On 28 June 1838, Augusta attended the coronation of her niece Queen Victoria. On 10 February 1840, she attended Victoria's wedding to Prince Albert of Saxe-Coburg and Gotha. She died later that year on 22 September at Clarence House, St. James, London, aged 71. Augusta was buried in the Royal Vault at St George's Chapel, Windsor on 2 October, after lying in state at Frogmore.

== Arms ==
As of 1789, as a daughter of the sovereign, Augusta Sophia had use of the arms of the kingdom, differenced by a label argent of three points, the centre point bearing a rose gules, the outer points ermine.

== Ancestry ==
Ancestors of Princess Augusta Sophia of the United Kingdom

8. George II of Great Britain
4. Frederick, Prince of Wales
9. Princess Caroline of Brandenburg-Ansbach
2. George III of the United Kingdom
10. Frederick II, Duke of Saxe-Gotha-Altenburg
5. Princess Augusta of Saxe-Gotha
11. Princess Magdalena Augusta of Anhalt-Zerbst
1. Princess Augusta Sophia of the United Kingdom
12. Adolphus Frederick II, Duke of Mecklenburg-Strelitz
6. Duke Charles Louis Frederick of Mecklenburg-Strelitz
13. Princess Christiane Emilie of Schwarzburg-Sondershausen
3. Princess Charlotte of Mecklenburg-Strelitz
14. Ernest Frederick I, Duke of Saxe-Hildburghausen
7. Princess Elisabeth Albertine of Saxe-Hildburghausen
15. Countess Sophia Albertine of Erbach-Erbach
