= Lightfoot (surname) =

Lightfoot is a surname. It was a nickname for a swift runner. Notable people with the surname include:

- Albert Lightfoot (1936–2023), English cricketer
- Amanda Lightfoot (born 1987), English biathlete
- Charles Lightfoot (born 1976), English lawyer and cricketer
- Chris Lightfoot (1978–2007), English scientist and political activist
- Chris Lightfoot (footballer) (born 1970), English footballer
- Claude Lightfoot (1910–1986), American activist
- David Lightfoot, Australian film producer
- Deborah Dillon Lightfoot (1956–2007), American wheelchair athlete
- Edwin N. Lightfoot (1925–2017), American chemical engineer
- Elba Lightfoot (1906–1989), African-American painter
- Genevievette Walker-Lightfoot, American attorney
- George Lightfoot (1889–1941), American businessman in Seattle
- George M. Lightfoot (1868–1947) American classics scholar, educator
- Gordon Lightfoot (1938–2023), Canadian singer-songwriter
- Hannah Lightfoot (1730–1759), sometimes erroneously named wife of George III of the United Kingdom
- Jane Lightfoot (born 1969), British classical scholar
- Jeffrey Lightfoot (born 1995), Singapore footballer
- Jim Lightfoot (speedway rider) (born 1933), English speedway rider
- Jim Ross Lightfoot (born 1938), American politician from Iowa
- John Lightfoot (1602–1675), English churchman and rabbinical scholar
- John Lightfoot (biologist) (1735–1788), English naturalist
- John Prideaux Lightfoot (1803–1887), English clergyman
- Jonni Lightfoot, bass player, Air Supply
- Joseph Barber Lightfoot (1828–1889), English theologian and Bishop of Durham
- KC Lightfoot (born 1999), American pole vaulter
- Kelvin Lightfoot (born 1925), South African lawn bowler
- Leonard Lightfoot (born 1947), American actor
- Lori Lightfoot (born 1962), American politician from Chicago
- Louise Mary Lightfoot (1902–1979), Australian architect, choreographer, and dancer
- Mary L. Lightfoot (1889–1970), American painter and printmaker
- Maxwell Gordon Lightfoot (1886–1911), English painter
- Mickey Lightfoot, alias of Osei Amponsa, English rapper, singer-songrwriter, musician, and producer
- Mike Lightfoot, football coach
- Orlando Lightfoot (born 1974), American basketball player
- Papa Lightfoot, alias for Alexander Lightfoot (1924–1971), American blues singer and harmonica player
- Prideaux Lightfoot (1836–1906), British Anglican priest
- Ricky Lightfoot (born 1985), British runner
- Robert Lightfoot (disambiguation), several people
- Rona Lightfoot (born 1936), Scottish bagpipe player
- Ross Lightfoot (born 1936), Australian politician
- Sara Lawrence-Lightfoot (born 1944), American sociologist
- Steve Lightfoot, alias for Robert Scott Fraser, British television writer and producer
- Teddy Lightfoot (1889–1918), English footballer
- Terra Lightfoot (born 1986), Canadian musician and singer-songwriter
- Terry Lightfoot (1935–2013), British jazz clarinetist and bandleader
- Thomas Lightfoot (1831–1904), South African archdeacon
- William Lightfoot (born 1950), American politician from the District of Columbia

== Fictional characters ==
- Miss Lightfoot, a recurring character in the Disney Channel TV show The Ghost and Molly McGee
- The Lightfoot family, a fictional family from the 2020 Pixar film Onward

== Given name ==
The following individuals have the given name of Lightfoot:

- Charles Lightfoot Roman, (1889–1961), Canadian surgeon
- Samuel Lightfoot Flournoy (politician) (1846–1904), European American politician
- Samuel Lightfoot Flournoy (lawyer) (1886–1961), European American lawyer
- William Lightfoot Price (1861–1916), European American Architect
