= English and British royal mistresses =

List of mistresses to English and British monarchs

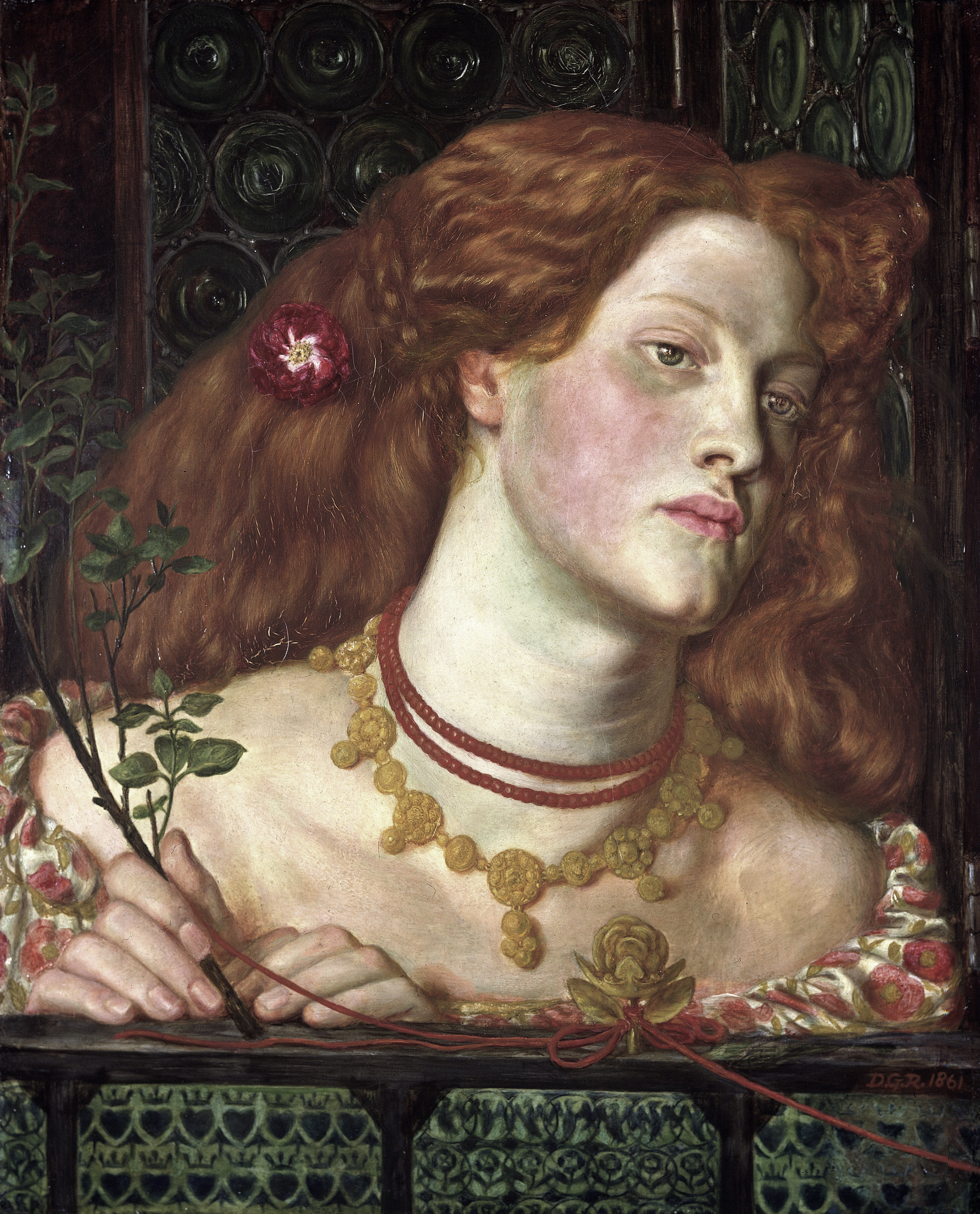
Fair Rosamund, an imaginary portrait of Rosamund Clifford, the most famous mistress of King Henry II of England, by Dante Gabriel Rossetti. Rosamund was rumored to have been poisoned by Henry II's wife, Queen Eleanor of Aquitaine, in some legends.

In the English or British court, a royal mistress is a woman who is the lover of a member of the royal family; specifically, the king. She may be taken either before or after his accession to the throne. Although it generally is only used of females, by extrapolation, the relation can cover any lover of the monarch, whether male or female. Elizabeth I is said to have had many male favourites, including Robert Dudley, 1st Earl of Leicester, although it is not known whether the relationships were sexual or not.

Monarchs have had an incentive to take mistresses in that they generally made dynastic marriages of convenience, and there was often little love in them.

Doctors also believed until the relatively recent past that it was unsafe for a man to have sex with a pregnant woman, which was another factor in regards to a king's decision to look outside of his marriage for intimacy.

Beyond the physical relationship, the royal mistress has often exercised a profound influence over the king, extending even to affairs of state. Her relationship with the queen consort could be tense, although some wives appear to have felt little jealousy in the matter.

Some notable examples of English and/or British Kings that are generally agreed to have never taken mistresses include William I, Henry III, his son Edward I, Henry VII, and George III. The end of George III's reign coincides with the European-wide practice of kings taking official mistresses beginning to fall out of fashion in the early 19th century.

== House of Wessex ==
=== Alfred the Great ===
Alfred the Great may have had an illegitimate son, Osferth, by a royal mistress. Osferth was described as a relative in King Alfred's will, and he attested charters in a high position until 934. A charter of King Edward's reign described him as the King's brother – mistakenly according to Keynes and Lapidge, but in the view of Janet Nelson, he probably was an illegitimate son of King Alfred.

=== Edward the Elder ===
Edward the Elder reportedly took Ecgwynn as his royal mistress, and she gave birth to his only son and heir, Æthelstan. The suggestion that Ecgwynn was Edward's mistress is accepted by some historians, such as Simon Keynes and Richard Abels, but Yorke and Æthelstan's biographer, Sarah Foot, disagree, arguing that the allegations should be seen in the context of the disputed succession in 924, and were not an issue in the 890s. Ecgwynn probably died by 899, as around the time of Alfred's death Edward married Ælfflæd, the daughter of Ealdorman Æthelhelm, probably of Wiltshire.

=== Edgar ===
Edgar, King of the English had children by three consorts. Almost all historians accept that he married the third one, but some question whether he married the first one; and others, the second. Yorke sees a case for recognising three marriages, as well as temporary liaisons.

The name of his first consort, who was the mother of his eldest son, Edward the Martyr, was not recorded until after the Norman Conquest. According to Osbern of Canterbury, writing in the late 11th century, she was a nun who was seduced by Edgar, but this is rejected by later chroniclers, and historians generally accept the statements of the 12th-century writers John of Worcester and William of Malmesbury that she was Æthelflæd Eneda, the daughter of Ordmær. Ann Williams describes her as his wife, but Cyril Hart says that Edward the Martyr was of doubtful legitimacy. The chroniclers described Ordmær as an ealdorman, but no ealdorman or thegn with that name attested any surviving 10th-century charter. According to the Liber Eliensis, a vir potens (powerful man) called Ordmær and his wife Ealde exchanged land with Æthelstan Half-King, and Edgar may have met Æthelflæd when he was Æthelstan's foster son. She probably died around 960. The historian Nicholas Brooks argues that Edgar must have married Æthelflæd, because Dunstan backed her son's succession to the throne, and he would not have supported an illegitimate son.

Edgar's second consort was called Wulfthryth. According to the late 11th-century Benedictine writer Goscelin, Edgar wished to marry her cousin Saint Wulfhild, the daughter of a nobleman called Wulfhelm, who had sent her to Wilton Abbey to be educated. Goscelin stated in his hagiography of Wulfhild that she resisted his determined advances, as she wished to become a nun, and he agreed to marry Wulfthryth, who was also being educated at Wilton. They had a daughter, Edith. Williams regards it as uncertain whether they married, but Yorke argues that they did, pointing out that Goscelin stated that she and Edgar were "bound by indissoluble vows", and that Edith's personal seal, which still survives, describes her as the "royal sister" of Kings Edward and Æthelred, implying that they recognised her legitimacy.

Wulfthryth returned to Wilton Abbey with her daughter by 964 and became a nun, allowing Edgar to remarry. He employed the renowned Lotharingian scholar, Radbod of Rheims, and the artist Benna of Trier, to educate Edith. Anglo-Saxon custom allowed for remarriage after a spouse entered a religious community, but on a strict interpretation of canon law, this was forbidden so long as the spouse lived, and so Edgar's third marriage may have had political repercussions. Wulfthryth and Edith were both later regarded as saints. However, support for Wulfthryth's sainthood never became widely established, unlike that of Edith, who was the subject of another hagiography by Goscelin.

== House of Normandy ==
=== William I ===
William the Conqueror, also known as William I and William the Bastard, was the illegitimate son of Robert I, Duke of Normandy, and his mistress, Herleva of Falaise, a daughter of Fulbert of Falaise; he may have been a tanner or embalmer. Herleva was possibly a member of the ducal household, but did not marry Robert. She later married Herluin de Conteville, with whom she had two sons – Odo of Bayeux and Count Robert of Mortain – and a daughter whose name is unknown. Robert I also had a daughter, Adelaide, by another mistress.

William himself would marry Matilda of Flanders sometime in the early 1050s in what was to become a happy and successful union. Their marriage produced somewhere between nine and eleven children. It is widely believed that William was faithful to his wife throughout their approximately thirty years of marriage as historians have never found any evidence of mistresses or illegitimate children associated with him.

=== Henry I ===
Henry I, the son of William the Conqueror, had a succession of mistresses before and during his reign, including Sybilla Corbet of Alcester, who was his mistress for over 13 years, and may have produced up to five children. He begat at least 24 illegitimate children, more than any other king of England.

His mistresses included:

- Gieva de Tracy
- Ansfride (born c. 1070)
- Lady Sybilla Corbet of Alcester (1077 – after 1157)
- Edith Forne
- Princess Nest ferch Rhys (c. 1073 – after 1136)
- Isabel de Beaumont (c. 1102 – c. 1172)

== House of Plantagenet ==
=== Henry II ===
Henry II had several long-term mistresses and some illegitimate children with them, the most prominent of his bastards were Geoffrey (later Archbishop of York) and William (later Earl of Salisbury).

His mistresses included:

- Rosamund Clifford (before 1150 – c. 1176)
- Ida de Tosny was a royal ward and mistress of Henry II
- Annabel de Balliol

=== John ===
John was King of England from 1199 to 1216 and had several known mistresses. Most of these relationships date to the time of his first marriage (which was later annulled) to Isabella, Countess of Gloucester, with whom he did not get along and had no children. The extent to which he was involved with other women, if at all, during his second marriage to Isabella of Angoulême is less clear. John had neither a known mistress nor illegitimate child fathered after this point, even during the years when the marriage presumably remained unconsummated due to Isabella's young age. They were known to have had a more companiable relationship than he did with his first wife, including having five children over the course of seven years.

His mistresses included:

- Adela de Warenne, his half-first cousin
- Hawise, sister of Fulk FitzWarin
- A woman named Clemence
- A woman named Suzanne

=== Edward II ===
Edward II (25 April 1284 – 21 September 1327), was king of England from 1307 until he was deposed in January 1327. Edward had a very close relationship with Piers Gaveston, who had first joined his household in 1300. The precise nature of Edward and Gaveston's relationship is uncertain; they may have been friends, lovers or sworn brothers. Gaveston's arrogance and power as Edward's favourite provoked discontent both among the barons and his French in-laws. Pressured by both groups, Edward was forced to exile him. On Gaveston's return, the King was pressured into agreeing to wide-ranging reforms called the Ordinances of 1311. Gaveston was banished by the barons, to which Edward responded by revoking the reforms and recalling his favourite. Led by Edward's cousin, Thomas, 2nd Earl of Lancaster, a group of the barons seized and executed Gaveston in 1312.

Another male favourite, Hugh Despenser the Younger, caused political trouble for Edward in the following decade. Despenser used his marriage to Edward's niece Eleanor de Clare to gain a foothold into the royal family. Edward's wife Isabella of France had tolerated Gaveston but quickly grew to hate Despenser and the sway he had over her husband. After Edward took ownership of her lands and custody of their children over their disagreements about his relationship with Despenser, their marriage broke down for good. Isabella, while ostensibly in France to visit her family on official business, launched a ploy aided by her brother Charles IV of France and probable lover Roger Mortimer to gain physical custody of her eldest son, Prince Edward. With the younger Edward safely away from his father's clutches, Isabella and Mortimer invaded England in his name in September 1326. The King and Despenser were quickly tracked down and captured. Despenser was put on trial and was hanged, drawn, and quartered in November after being found guilty of high treason. Edward himself was forced to abdicate in favor of his son and died in captivity the following September.

Whatever the nature of the relationships with his male favourites might have been, Edward had a sexual relationship with at least one other woman besides Isabella. He acknowledged an illegitimate child known as Adam FitzRoy who was born in about 1307, although his mother's identity is unknown.

=== Edward III ===
Edward III appears to have been devoted to his wife, Philippa of Hainault, who bore him 12 children. However, late in their marriage the aged King met Alice Perrers, a young lady-in-waiting to the Queen. Some sources have it that she became his mistress in 1363, six years before his wife's death; others date their relationship to the time when the Queen was terminally ill. The affair was not made public until after the Queen's death, when the King lavished gifts and honours on her. Edward III and Alice Perrers would have three illegitimate children.

=== Richard II ===
Richard II (6 January 1367– February 1400) was king of England from 1377 until he was deposed on 30 September 1399. A member of the close circle around the King was Robert De Vere, Earl of Oxford, who emerged as the King's favourite. De Vere's lineage, while an ancient one, was relatively modest in the peerage of England. Richard's close friendship to De Vere was disagreeable to the political establishment and this displeasure was exacerbated by the Earl's elevation to the new title of Duke of Ireland in 1386. The chronicler Thomas Walsingham suggested the relationship between the King and De Vere was of a homosexual nature.

=== Henry IV ===
Henry IV had one known illegitimate child, a son named Edmund by an unknown woman. Edmund was born in 1401, shortly after Henry's ascension to the throne but before his second marriage to Joan of Navarre in 1403. He took holy orders in 1412 (the year before his father's death), at which point he disappears from the historical record.

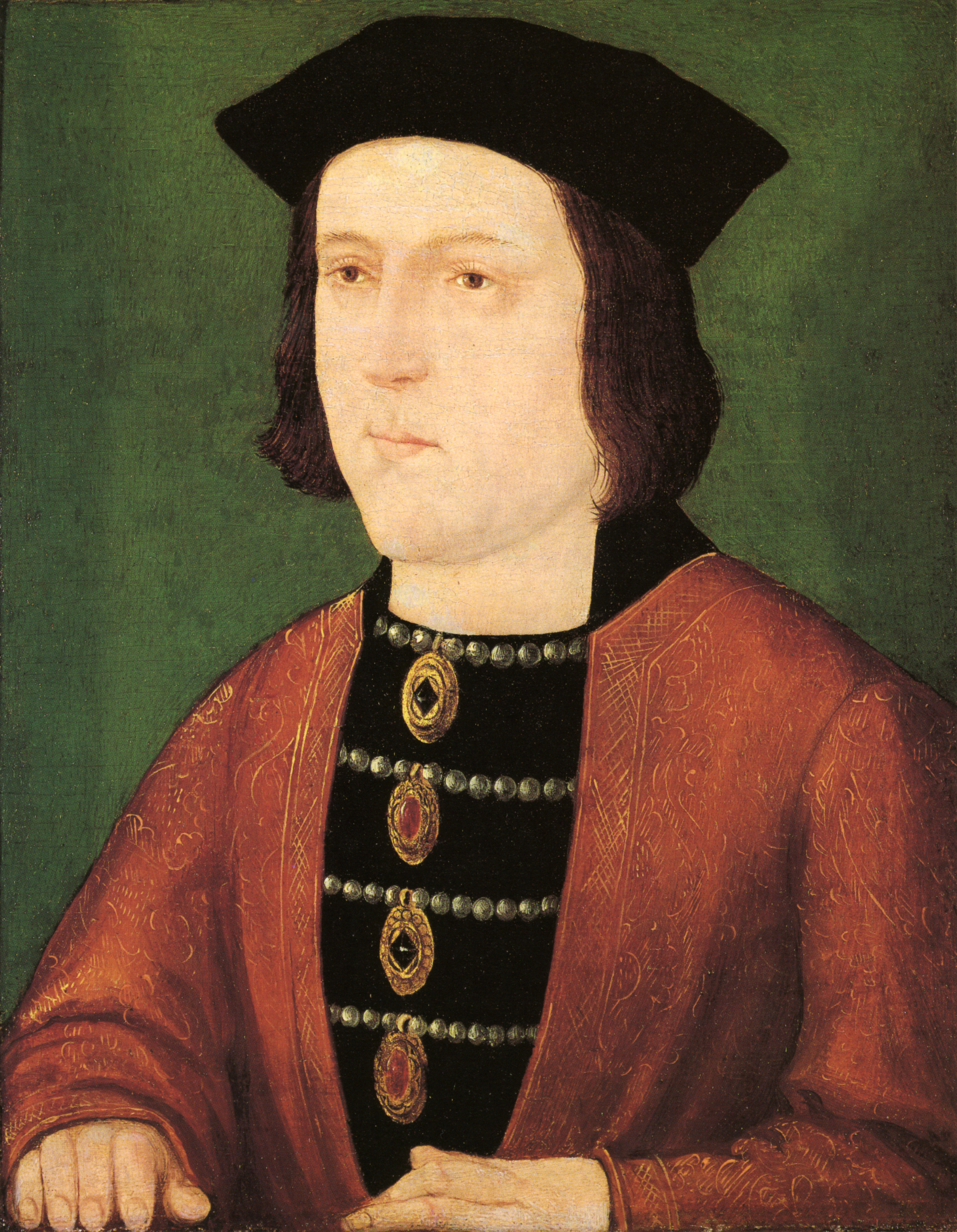
Edward IV, whose womanising led to several claims concerning precontracted marriages

=== Edward IV ===
Edward IV had numerous documented mistresses, they included:

- Jane Shore (also known as Elizabeth)
- Elizabeth Lucy (or Elizabeth Waite), with whom he had Elizabeth Plantagenet (b. circa 1464) who married Thomas Lumley of Beautrove Durham before 1478, and Arthur Plantagenet, 1st Viscount Lisle (1460s/1470s – 3 March 1542).
- He also had children by unknown mothers. Recent speculations suggests them as children by Lucy or Waite.
  - Grace Plantagenet. She is known to have been present at the funeral of her stepmother Elizabeth Woodville in 1492.
  - Mary Plantagenet, married Henry Harman of Ellam, son of Thomas and Elizabeth Harman and widower of certain Agnes.
  - Another daughter, said to have been the first wife of John Tuchet, 6th Baron Audley.

=== Richard III ===
Richard III had two acknowledged illegitimate children: Katherine Plantagenet, second wife of William Herbert, 2nd Earl of Pembroke, and John of Gloucester. Who their mothers were is not known. There is no evidence of infidelity on Richard's part after his marriage to Anne Neville in 1472 when he was around 20 and since Katherine was old enough to be wedded in 1484 and John was old enough to be knighted in 1483 in York Minster (when his half brother Edward, Richard's only legitimate heir, was invested Prince of Wales) and to be made Captain of Calais in March 1485, possibly aged 17 (still a minor, since he would be of age at 21) almost all historians agree these 2 children were fathered during Richard's teen years.

== House of Tudor ==
=== Henry VII ===
By contemporary reports, Henry VII seems to have loved his wife, Elizabeth of York and was faithful to her. Although there is no evidence of his ever having had a mistress or fathering an illegitimate child during their marriage, some have proposed that he may have fathered an illegitimate child, Roland de Velville, during his years in exile in France. De Velville was born sometime around 1474 to an unknown mother (some dozen years before Henry and Elizabeth's marriage) and remained a faithful companion to the King from his ascension to the throne until his death in 1509. This supposition was more widely believed in the past but modern scholarship, for the most part, has grown to reject it.

=== Henry VIII ===
By contrast, his son Henry VIII took multiple mistresses in addition to his six wives. The first was supposed to be a Frenchwoman named Jane Popincourt, whom he met in 1514, although their relationship is not certain. She had taught languages to Henry's sisters Margaret and Mary. Little is known of her, though she is said to have been a woman of very loose habits.

His next mistress, Elizabeth Blount, was seventeen or eighteen when she came to his attention in 1518. The affair was ill-concealed, and Katherine of Aragon grew jealous and attempted to separate them, without success. Early in 1519, Elizabeth gave birth to a son, Henry Fitzroy. The King then quit her, and she was afterwards married to Gilbert Tailboys.

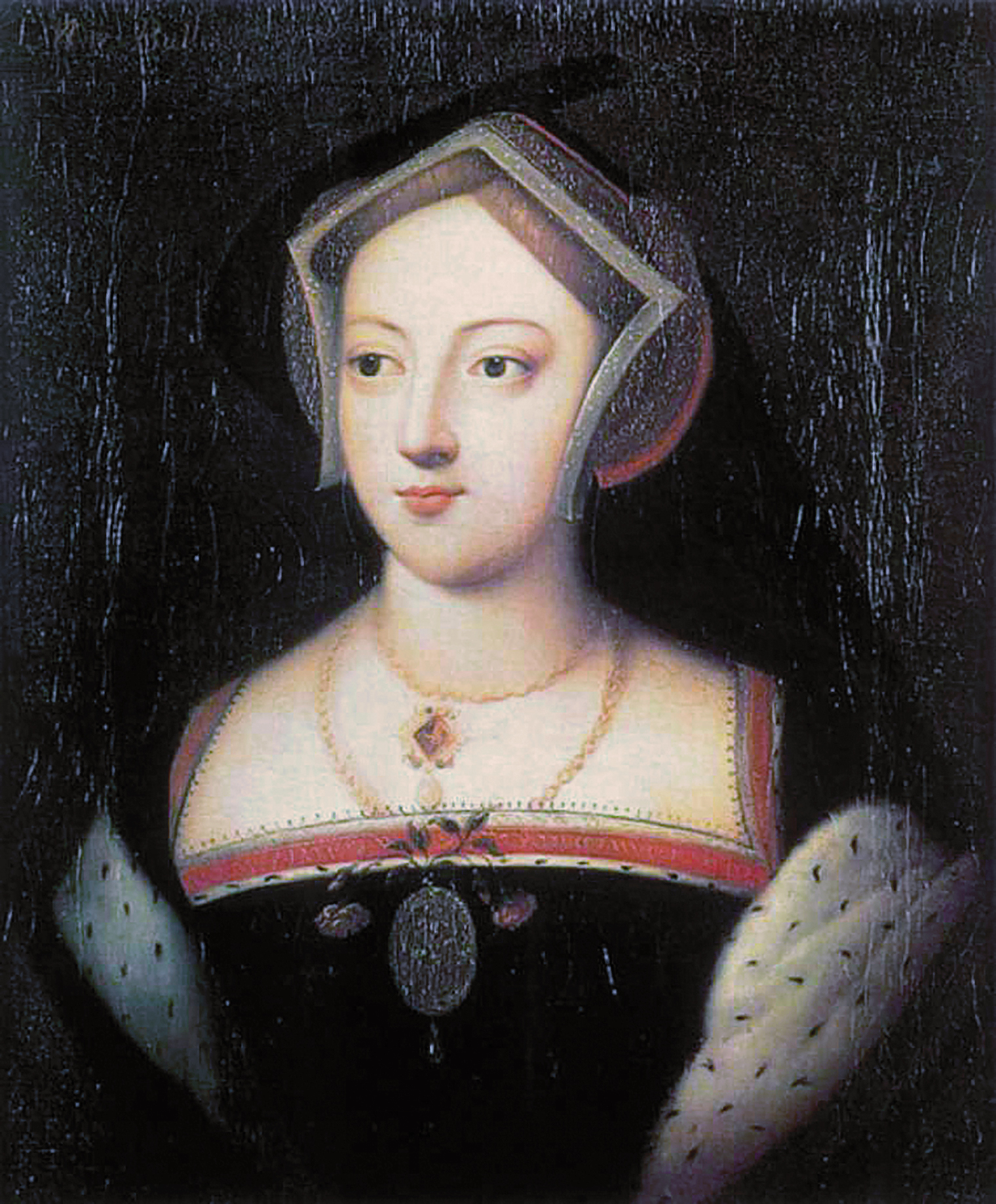
Mary Boleyn is said to have been so promiscuous she was called the "great prostitute"

Mary Boleyn, an Englishwoman of the French court, replaced her in the King's favour. Like Jane Popincourt, she was known for her promiscuity. Although she was married to Sir William Carey when her affair with Henry began in the early 1520s, Carey is thought to have been compliant. The King was reputed to be the father of her children Catherine Carey and Henry Carey, 1st Baron Hunsdon.

Henry's second wife was Anne Boleyn, sister to Mary Boleyn. While beginning proceedings for his divorce from Katherine of Aragon (as she had borne him no male heir), he attempted to seduce Anne; she repudiated his advances, and he married her instead on 25 January 1533. He is rumoured to have taken another mistress, Mary Shelton, soon after this marriage, but the details are unclear.

Henry went on to marry Jane Seymour, Anne of Cleves, Catherine Howard and Catherine Parr. Jane Seymour, like Anne, refused to be his mistress and became his third wife. From this time there is no record of his having had a mistress; he had enough to do with his wives. His other reputed illegitimate children, Thomas Stukley, John Perrot and Ethelreda Malte, were born in the 1520s.

=== Other Tudor monarchs ===
Henry VIII's three children followed him of the throne, but none of them appears to have had a lover. His son Edward VI died before he was sixteen, and was followed by his two sisters Mary I of England and Elizabeth I. Elizabeth I's status as a 'Virgin Queen' was an important part of her public image. Although she clearly had favourites, there is no clear evidence that any of these was a lover.

== House of Stuart ==
=== James I ===
James I, the first of the Stuart monarchs, is widely believed to have been bisexual, as he had a number of intensely emotional relationships with men throughout his life, including Robert Carr, 1st Earl of Somerset and then George Villiers, 1st Duke of Buckingham. Whether they were friends or lovers is a controversial subject among historians, with the majority believing that a physical relationship is likely. Before his accession to the English throne in 1603 James had been linked romantically with Esmé Stewart, 1st Duke of Lennox, and with Anne Murray, later Anne Lyon, Countess of Kinghorne.

Robert Carr, who was Scottish like the King, caught James' attention when he fell off a horse and broke his leg during a tourney. The King took a liking to him, nursed him through his injury and even tried to teach him Latin afterwards. He rose quickly in the court, first to the rank of knight and then becoming Viscount Rochester, being given a seat in the Privy Council, and being created Earl of Somerset in rapid succession. James did not care whether his favourites married or remained single; when Robert Carr expressed love for Frances Howard, a woman already married to Robert Devereux, 3rd Earl of Essex, James had the earlier marriage annulled so that Somerset could lawfully marry Frances. They were wedded on 26 December 1613, just two months after the annulment.

However, Robert's time in the King's affections was cut short. On 15 September 1613, ten days prior to the annulment, Thomas Overbury had died of poison while imprisoned in the Tower of London. Overbury was a friend of Robert but fervently against the marriage to Frances. In April, the supporters of the union had tried to remove him by convincing James I to assign him as his ambassador to the court of Michael of Russia. Overbury was by then too much involved in the case and declined the royal assignment so James had him imprisoned. Overbury had been poisoned with sulphuric acid in the form of copper salts. Edward Coke and Francis Bacon worked together in the trial of the poisoners, which began in 1615. By the time it was over in early 1616, Frances had been found guilty of having hired the poisoners and orchestrated the murder. Robert claimed ignorance but was sentenced to death with his wife as an accomplice. James commuted the sentences to imprisonment. The couple were eventually released but never regained their positions at court.

George Villiers followed after the deposition of Robert Carr, and his rise in royal favour was so quick that contemporaries described it as a flight rather than a growth. Many assumed that his fall from favour would be just as rapid; in preparation, the ambitious Howard family arranged for a boy named William Monson to become known to James. William was the second son of William Monson but would gain greater fame as one of the Regicides of Charles I of England.

However, Villiers proved himself to be far more long-lasting, and James's relationship had a paternal element. James even described George as "my sweet child and wife" while signing himself "your old dad and husband". James married his lover to Katherine Manners, the richest heiress in England and the next-in-line for the title and associated property of the barony of Ros, which she would inherit in 1632. James also showered the Villiers family with titles and money, making them among the most powerful in the kingdom. Several other members of the family would go on to become royal mistresses, notably Barbara Villiers and Elizabeth Villiers.

=== Charles II ===
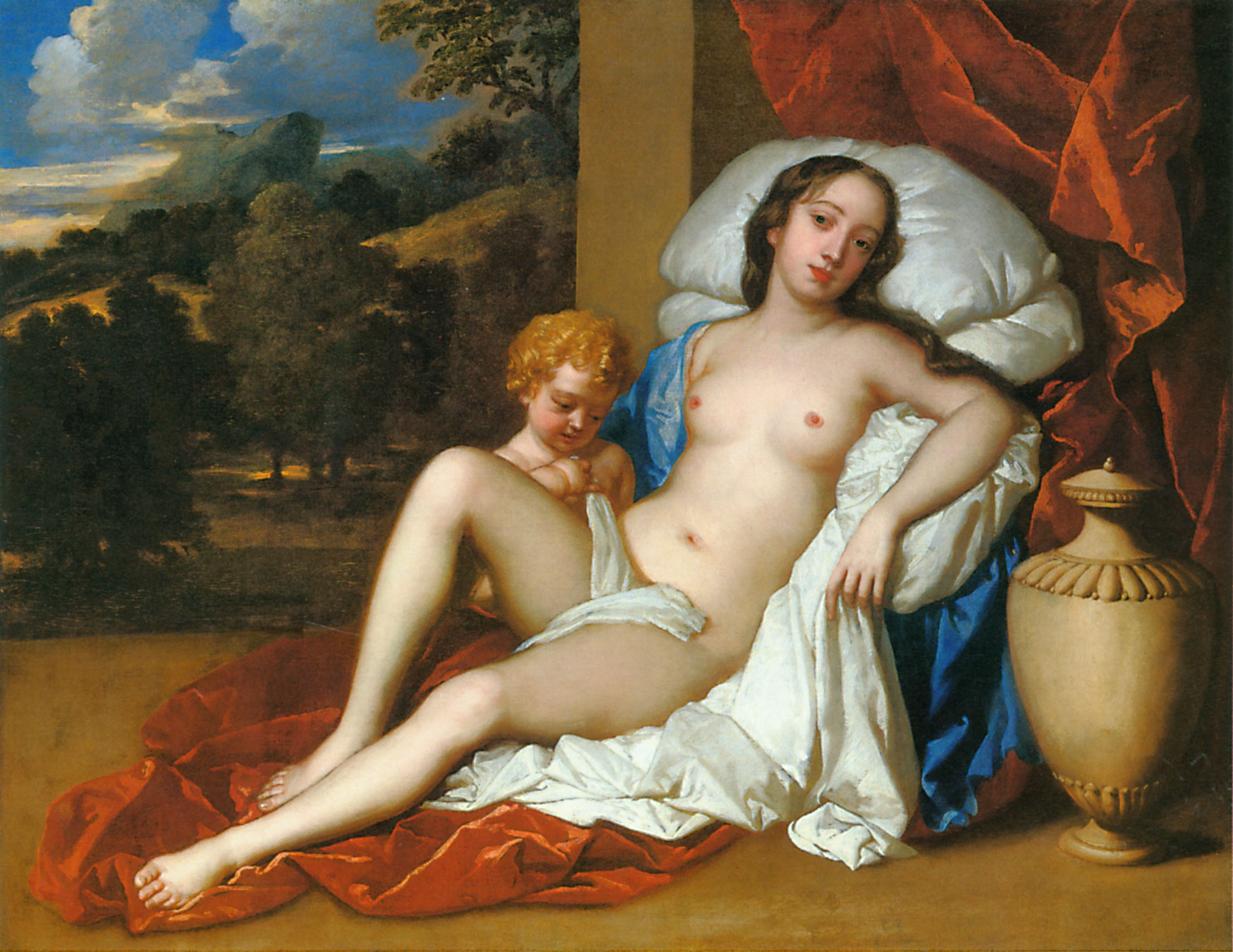
This nude may represent either Nell Gwynn, Charles II's most famous mistress or Barbara Villiers as Venus with Cupid, who is about to pull off the last vestige of cloth, covering her genitals, by Peter Lely

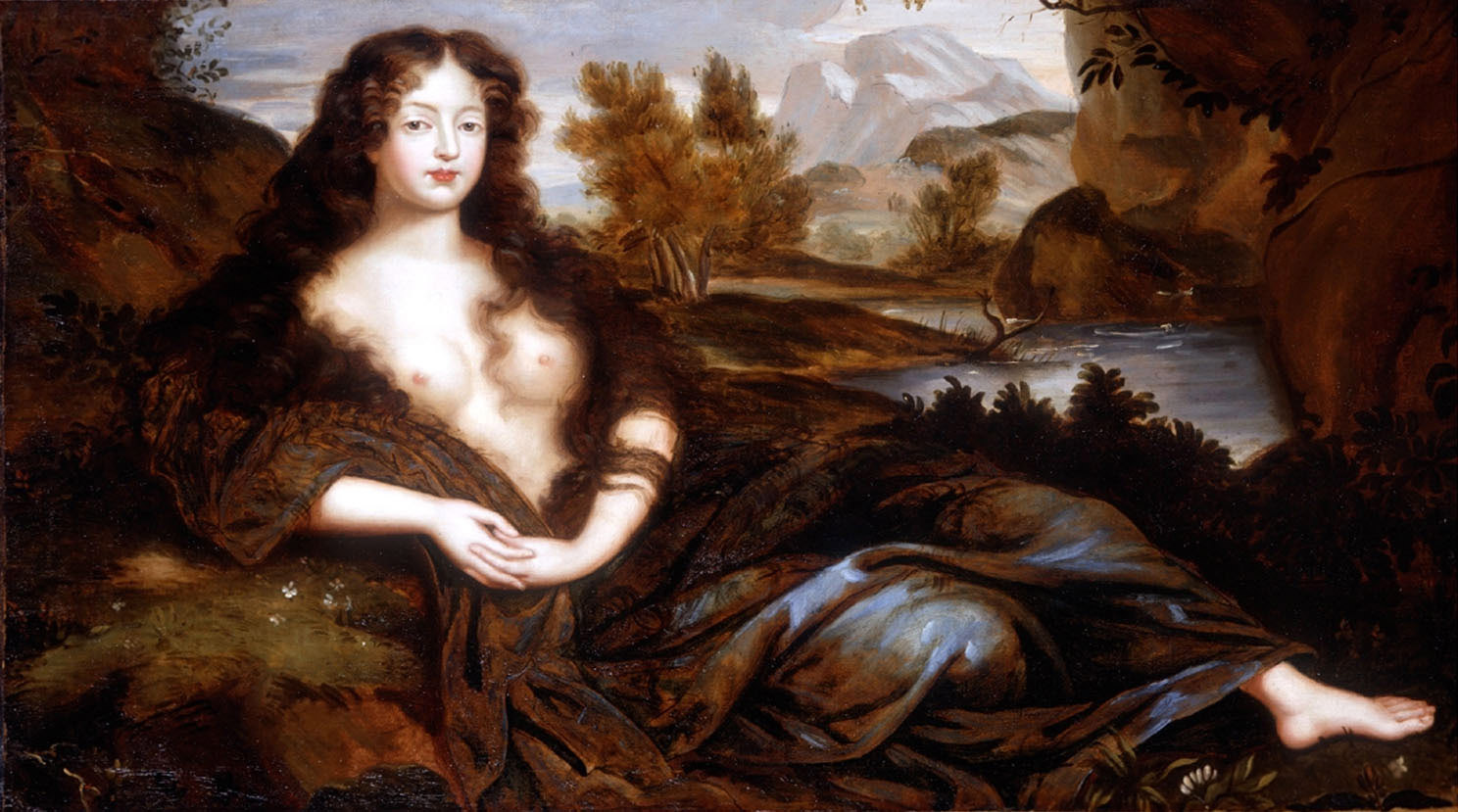
Louise de Kérouaille, Duchess of Portsmouth, by Henri Gascar

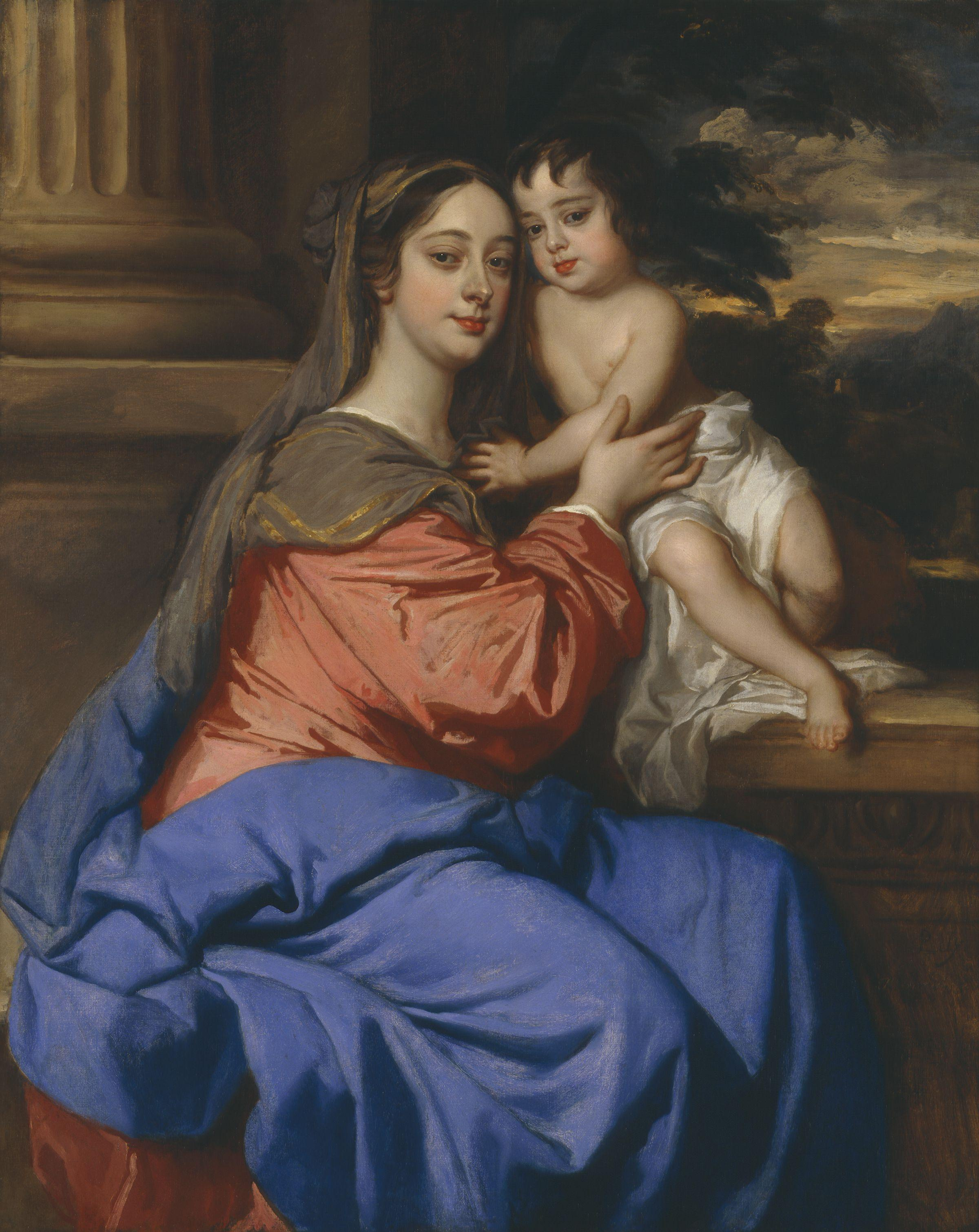
Barbara Villiers with her son, Charles Fitzroy, as Madonna and Child, by Peter Lely circa 1664

Charles II, the grandson of King James I, has been reckoned the most notorious womaniser of the English kings. Charles is the first monarch whose mistresses from the lower classes are recorded. His mistresses included:

- Elizabeth Killigrew, Viscountess Shannon
- Lucy Walter
- Jane Roberts
- Catherine Pegge
- Winifred Wells
- Barbara Palmer, 1st Duchess of Cleveland (née Barbara Villiers of the Villiers family)
- Moll Davis
- Nell Gwyn
- Louise de Kérouaille, Duchess of Portsmouth
- Hortense Mancini
- Mrs. Knight
- Mary Bagot, Countess of Falmouth and Dorset (widow of Charles Berkeley, 1st Earl of Falmouth)
- Elizabeth Fitzgerald, Countess of Kildare

Barbara Villiers, one of his longest-standing mistresses (fourteen years), was a woman well known for her beauty, as well as her sexual promiscuity and that she had affairs with at least five other men during her tenure as mistress (and it was rumored that one of these affairs was with Charles's eldest bastard, son by Lucy Walter). Barbara wielded considerable political power, obtaining for her friends and family places on the Privy Council of England and undermining peace efforts between the Kingdom of England and the Dutch Republic. Another of his mistresses, Louise de Kérouaille, was a known French spy, and the one who followed her, Hortense Mancini, reportedly the wildest and most beautiful of Charles's mistresses, was known to be bisexual. She was known to be a lover of Anne Palmer, an illegitimate daughter of Charles II and Barbara Villiers. The most famous of Charles's mistresses, Nell Gwyn, was a stage actress and had been a prostitute before the King became interested in her. His dying thoughts are reported to have been a concern that provision should be made for her.

His eldest bastard, James Scott, 1st Duke of Monmouth, attempted to prove himself true born, claiming that Charles had actually secretly married his mother, Lucy Walter, a prostitute after the King lost interested in her. Monmouth's rebellion failed, at least in part because he could not produce evidence to support his legitimacy, and Lucy is usually considered by historians to be a royal mistress rather than a secret wife. He was captured and executed in the Tower of London.

Despite his numerous illegitimate offspring, fourteen acknowledged bastards, Charles II was unable to get an heir from his wife, Queen Catherine, daughter of Dom João IV of Portugal.

=== James II ===
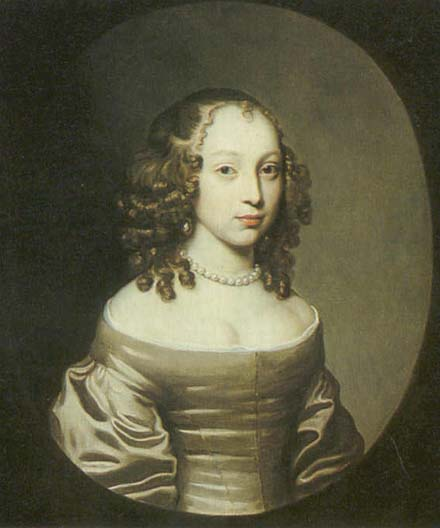
Arabella Churchill

Charles was succeeded by his younger brother James II, who may have had as many as eleven mistresses. He did not follow the accepted standard of beauty of the time: while his contemporaries sought out heavy-set, voluptuous women on the Baroque model, James was attracted to skinny, boyish young girls in their teens. He was a Catholic, and his brother, Charles II, remarked in jest that his mistresses were "so ugly that they must have been provided as penance by his confessors".

His mistresses included:

- Anne Hyde (later his wife)
- Arabella Churchill (1648 – 1730), who bore James II four illegitimate children
- Catherine Sedley, Countess of Dorchester (1657 – 1717)
- Elizabeth Stanhope, Countess of Chesterfield (rumoured)

Anne Hyde was his mistress before she became his wife; he met her in 1657 at The Hague, and by some reports, promised marriage to her when he became her lover a year or so after. She became pregnant; but they were not officially married, as was often the custom of the time, until the year following, 24 November 1659.

His brother, King Charles II, sent lawyers to Breda when Anne Hyde insisted they had been secretly married, where the legal marriage was registered in the public records as having taken place there on 24 November 1659. Further confirmation was the confession of James II's sister the Princess Royal who, on her deathbed, confessed that she had set up the untrue slander against Anne. His longest-lasting mistress, Arabella Churchill, was described as nothing but skin and bone. He noticed her while out for a ride; she fell from her horse, exposing her legs.

=== Other Stuart monarchs ===
Charles I was also extremely attached to Villiers, his father's friend, but he is not known to have had a physical relationship with anybody but his wife, Queen Henrietta Maria.

Neither Mary II nor Anne had any physical relationships outside of marriage, although Anne had intense emotional attachments to both Sarah Churchill, Duchess of Marlborough and Sarah's cousin Abigail Masham, Baroness Masham, both of whom became politically important.

William III, the husband and co-ruler of Mary II, was presumed to have had one mistress, Elizabeth Villiers.

== House of Hanover ==
=== George I ===
George I had divorced his wife Sophia Dorothea of Celle 20 years before his accession to the British throne, and thus brought with him to the Kingdom of Great Britain his long-established mistress: Ehrengard Melusine von der Schulenburg, who was so tall and scrawny that she was nicknamed "the maypole". Sophia von Kielmansegg, sometimes referred to as a mistress of George I, was actually his morganatic half-sister; they were both children of Ernest Augustus, Elector of Hanover. She was known to compete for influence with Melusine and was assumed, or pretended, to be a mistress by the British courtiers.

=== George II ===
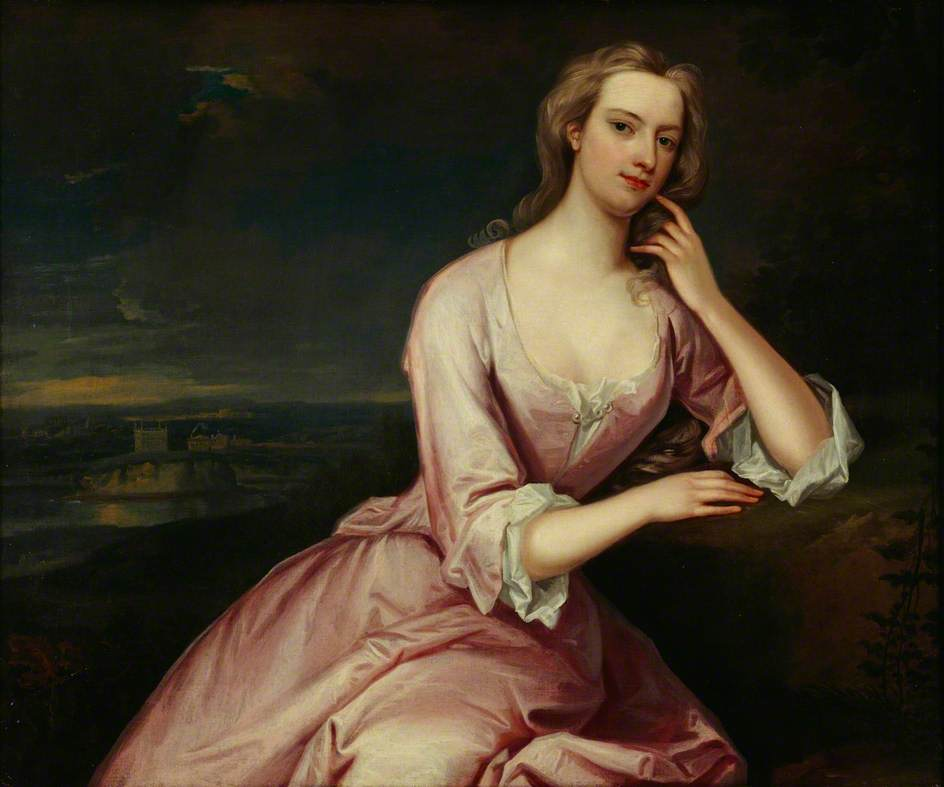
George II's mistress Henrietta Howard

George II had only one principal mistress, Henrietta Howard, who maintained this station for well over a decade. It is probable that George II considered having a mistress necessary, for he was very much in love with his wife Caroline of Brandenburg-Ansbach. He made a point of visiting Henrietta for several hours each night, locking the door, but most agreed that they spent their time playing cards. However, when she became deaf in her early forties, he quickly became bored with her, and they parted amiably. George II did not take another mistress after his wife's death of umbilical rupture on 20 November 1737, until Amalie von Wallmoden, Countess of Yarmouth.

=== George III ===
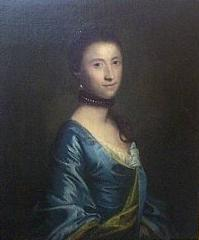
Hannah Lightfoot

George III followed the more chaste examples of his father Frederick, Prince of Wales and grandfather George II. He took no serious mistress during his reign. This comparative virtue was favored by the increasingly chaste moral standards of the time. However he was later rumoured to have secretly married Hannah Lightfoot prior to his public wedding to Charlotte of Mecklenburg-Strelitz, as well as had an alleged liaison with Lady Sarah Lennox, the daughter of Charles Lennox, 2nd Duke of Richmond.

=== George IV ===
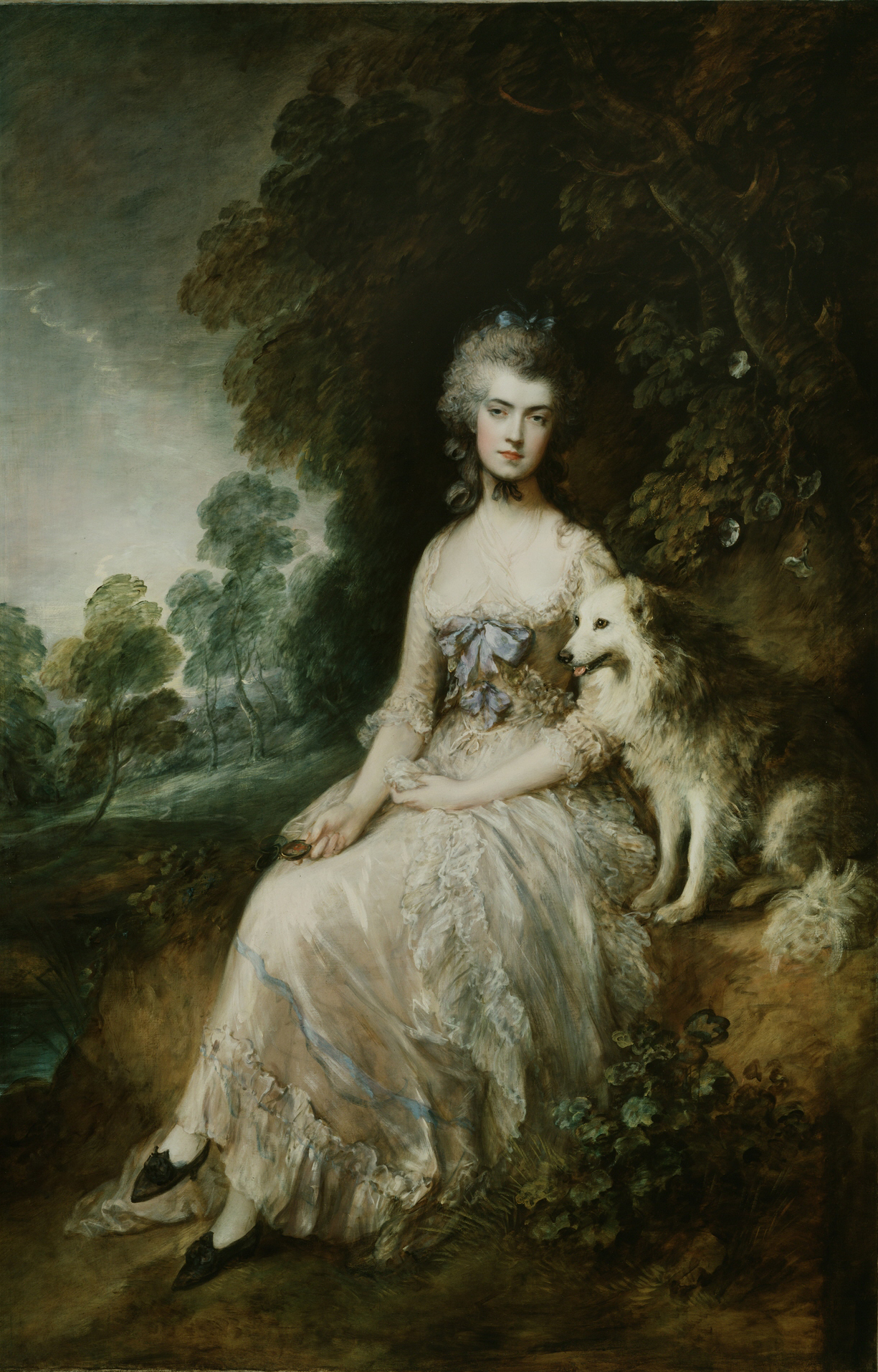
Mary Robinson

His son George IV, first prince regent during George III's periods of insanity and then king following his death, carried on an affair of twenty years with a widow, Maria Fitzherbert, with whom he lived and considered his true wife. He was reported to have even married her, even though he became increasingly unfaithful and accepted the paternity of several illegitimate children throughout this time period. Afterwards, he rejected any possible marriage he might have made with Fitzherbert. His other notable mistresses included Mary Robinson, Frances Twysden, Grace Elliott, Isabella Seymour-Conway, Marchioness of Hertford and Elizabeth Conyngham, Marchioness Conyngham.

George IV and his legitimate wife Caroline of Brunswick were never fond of their arranged marriage and lived separately from 1796 to her death on 7 August 1821. Their only daughter Princess Charlotte of Wales was born very early in the marriage. That both George and Caroline took other lovers was not therefore unexpected. George survived his only legitimate daughter.

=== William IV ===
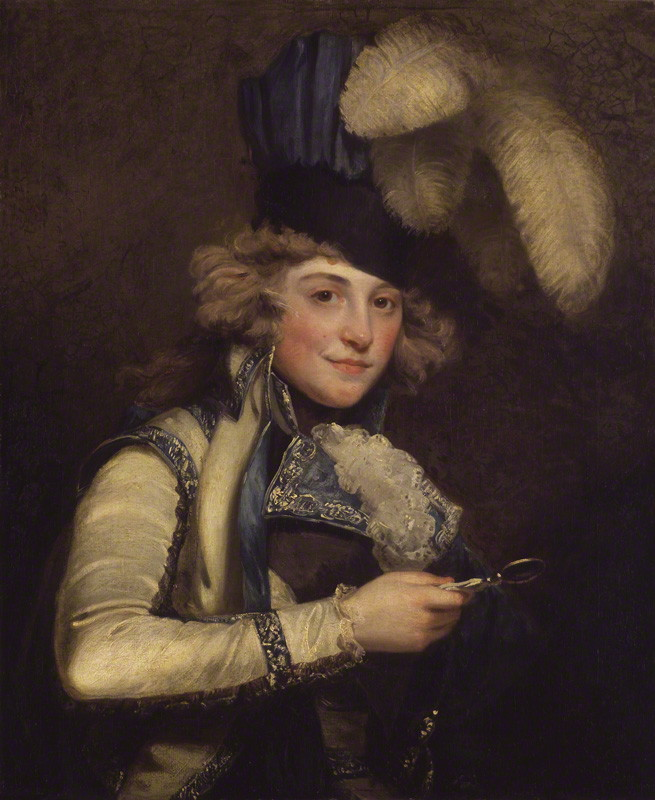
Dorothea Jordan as Hippolyta by John Hoppner, 1791. The Irish actress Dorothea Jordan was in a long-standing relationship with the future William IV.

George was succeeded by his younger brother William IV on 26 June 1830. William had cohabited with his mistress Dorothea Jordan from the late 1780s to 1811. He married his wife Adelaide of Saxe-Meiningen on 11 July 1818. They were reputed to have a happy marriage until his death on 20 June 1837 and evidence of any other mistress is absent.

=== Victoria ===
Queen Victoria married her husband Albert when she was 20, and the two enjoyed a devoted marriage until his death in 1861. In grief-stricken widowhood she largely closed herself away from the world. However, in the latter part of her reign, there was contemporary gossip around her manservant and friend John Brown. Some more far-fetched accounts even suggested a secret marriage. In reality, there is no evidence that the relationship was anything other than platonic.

== House of Saxe-Coburg and Gotha ==
=== Edward VII ===
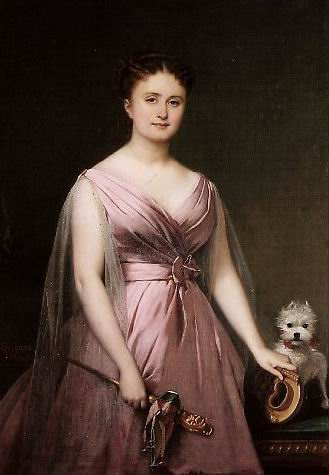
Hortense Schneider

Victoria's son Edward VII, who ascended on 22 January 1901, was notorious for his many infidelities. However, each of these affairs was carried out in a kind and discreet manner, which did much to endear him to his subjects. His notable mistresses included a French actress, Hortense Schneider, a French courtesan, Giulia Barucci, who boasted that she was the "greatest whore in the world", Susan Pelham-Clinton, who had already eloped twice, Lillie Langtry, an actress who had also been courted by Edward's brother and an Austrian prince, Daisy Greville, Countess of Warwick, Agnes Keyser, and Alice Keppel, who of all his mistresses had the most political power and sat at his deathbed in 1910. Another of his mistresses was Winston Churchill's mother Lady Randolph Churchill. Edward fathered surprisingly few royal bastards considering his many mistresses and the fecundity he enjoyed with his wife Alexandra of Denmark.

== House of Windsor ==
=== Edward VIII ===
Edward VIII kept mistresses openly. Among them were mostly married women like Freda Dudley Ward and Thelma Furness, Viscountess Furness.

He was introduced to Wallis Simpson in January 1931 by Lady Furness, and they became lovers in 1934. When he ascended the throne in 1936 she had divorced her first husband and was in the process of divorcing her second husband, Ernest; nevertheless, Edward wished to marry her. This was against all precedent; the teaching of the contemporary Church of England, of which Edward as king was Supreme Governor, was that divorcees could not remarry within the lifetime of former spouses. Commonwealth Prime Ministers were not unanimous on whether the marriage would be unconstitutional, but there was considerable opposition, led by the British government and the archbishops.

Public sympathy was similarly divided, and the issue threatened to become a constitutional crisis: morganatic marriages had not been known in Britain. On 11 December 1936, Edward abdicated and left the United Kingdom so that he could marry his mistress; he did so and lived as Duke of Windsor in exile until his death.

=== Charles III ===
Charles III, who ascended on 8 September 2022, engaged in an on-and-off affair with Camilla Shand starting from 1971 and later admitted that he had never loved his first wife, Lady Diana Spencer, whom he felt obliged to marry (in 1981). This created a generally bad public image for Prince Charles, and public sentiment prevented him from marrying Camilla immediately after his divorce and Diana's death in 1997. However, public anger somewhat subsided, and after receiving Elizabeth II's consent in 2005, they were finally married in a civil ceremony on 9 April 2005. Upon Charles's accession, Camilla became queen consort. Notably, Camilla is the great-granddaughter of Alice Keppel, one of Edward VII's mistresses.

== See also ==
- Royal mistress

== Sources ==
- Abels, Richard (1998). Alfred the Great: War, Kingship and Culture in Anglo-Saxon England. Harlow, Essex: Longman. ISBN 978-0-582-04047-2.
- Brooks, Nicholas (1984). The Early History of the Church of Canterbury. Leicester, UK: Leicester University Press. ISBN 978-0-7185-1182-1.
- Darlington, Reginald R.; McGurk, Patrick, eds. (1995). The Chronicle of John of Worcester (in Latin and English). Vol. 2. Oxford, UK: Clarendon Press. ISBN 978-0-19-822261-3.
- Cooper, Tracy-Anne (March 2013). "Review of Æthelstan: The First King of England by Sarah Foot". Journal of World History. 24 (1): 189–192. doi:10.1353/jwh.2013.0025. ISSN 1045-6007. S2CID 162023751.
- Dabiri, Emma (27 September 2017). "Filled with 'a number of male lovelies': the surprising court of King James VI and I". BBC.
- Foot, Sarah (2008). "Where English Becomes British: Rethinking Contexts for Brunanburh". In Barrow, Julia; Wareham, Andrew (eds.). Myth, Rulership, Church and Charters. Abingdon, Oxfordshire: Ashgate. pp. 127–144. ISBN 978-0-7546-5120-8.
- Foot, Sarah (2011). Æthelstan: The First King of England. New Haven, Connecticut: Yale University Press. ISBN 978-0-300-12535-1.
- Foot, Sarah (2011a). "Æthelstan (Athelstan) (893/4–939), king of England". Oxford Dictionary of National Biography. Oxford University Press. doi:10.1093/ref:odnb/833.(subscription, Wikipedia Library access or UK public library membership required)
- Hart, Cyril (1966). The Early Charters of Eastern England. Leicester, UK: Leicester University Press. OCLC 645356664.
- Hart, Cyril (1992). The Danelaw. London, UK: The Hambledon Press. ISBN 978-1-85285-044-9.
- Hart, Cyril (2005). "Æthelwine [Ethelwine, Æthelwine Dei Amicus] (d. 992)". Oxford Dictionary of National Biography. Oxford University Press. doi:10.1093/ref:odnb/8919. ISBN 978-0-19-861412-8. (subscription, Wikipedia Library access or UK public library membership required)
- Hart, Cyril (2007). "Edward [St Edward; called Edward the Martyr] (c. 962–978)". Oxford Dictionary of National Biography. Oxford University Press. doi:10.1093/ref:odnb/8515. ISBN 978-0-19-861412-8. (subscription, Wikipedia Library access or UK public library membership required)
- Hollis, Stephanie (2004). "Wilton as a Centre of Learning". In Hollis, Stephanie (ed.). Writing the Wilton Women: Goscelin's Legend of Edith and Liber Confortatorius. Turnhout, Belgium: Brepols. pp. 307–338. ISBN 978-2-503-51436-9.
- Insley, Charles (2012). "Charters, Ritual and Late Tenth-Century Kingship". In Nelson, Janet; Reynolds, Susan; Johns, Susan (eds.). Gender and Historiography: Studies in the Earlier Middle Ages in Honour of Pauline Stafford. London, UK: University of London Press: Institute of Historical Research. pp. 75–89. doi:10.14296/117.9771909646469. ISBN 978-1-905165-79-7.
- Keynes, Simon; Lapidge, Michael, eds. (1983). Alfred the Great: Asser's Life of King Alfred & Other Contemporary Sources. London, UK: Penguin Classics. ISBN 978-0-14-044409-4.
- Keynes, Simon (1985). "King Æthelstan's books". In Lapidge, Michael; Gneuss, Helmut (eds.). Learning and Literature in Anglo-Saxon England. Cambridge, UK: Cambridge University Press. pp. 143–201. ISBN 978-0-521-25902-6.
- Keynes, Simon (1999). "England, c. 900–1016". In Reuter, Timothy (ed.). The New Cambridge Medieval History. Vol. III. Cambridge, UK: Cambridge University Press. pp. 456–484. ISBN 978-0-521-36447-8.
- Keynes, Simon (2001). "Edward, King of the Anglo-Saxons". In Higham, N. J.; Hill, D. H. (eds.). Edward the Elder 899–924. Abingdon, Oxfordshire: Routledge. pp. 40–66. ISBN 978-0-415-21497-1.
- Keynes, Simon (2008). "Edgar rex admirabilis". In Scragg, Donald (ed.). Edgar King of the English: New Interpretations. Woodbridge, Suffolk: The Boydell Press. pp. 3–58. ISBN 978-1-84383-399-4.
- Keynes, Simon (2014) [1st edition 1999]. "Appendix I: Rulers of the English, c. 450–1066". In Lapidge, Michael; Blair, John; Keynes, Simon; Scragg, Donald (eds.). The Wiley Blackwell Encyclopedia of Anglo-Saxon England (Second ed.). Chichester, West Sussex: Wiley Blackwell. pp. 521–538. ISBN 978-0-470-65632-7.
- Mynors, Roger A. B.; Thomson, Rodney M.; Winterbottom, Michael, eds. (1998). William of Malmesbury: Gesta Regum Anglorum, The History of the English Kings (in Latin and English). Vol. I. Oxford, UK: Clarendon Press. ISBN 978-0-19-820678-1.
- Nelson, Janet (1999). Rulers and Ruling Families in Early Medieval Europe. Aldershot: Ashgate. ISBN 0-86078-802-4.
- Nelson, Janet (2003). "Alfred's Carolingian Contemporaries". In Reuter, Timothy (ed.). Alfred the Great. Aldershot, UK: Ashgate. pp. 293–310. ISBN 978-0-7546-0957-5.
- Nelson, Janet (2004). "Æthelwulf (d. 858)". Oxford Dictionary of National Biography (online ed.). Oxford University Press. doi:10.1093/ref:odnb/8921. (Subscription, Wikipedia Library access or UK public library membership required.)
- Ortenberg, Veronica (2002). The English Church and the Continent. Oxford, UK: Clarendon Press. ISBN 978-0-19-820159-5.
- Painter, Sean T. (2015). "Rex Fuit Elizabeth: Nunc Est Regina Jacobus (Elizabeth Was King Now James Is Queen)" (PDF). The Chico Historian. 25. California State University, Chico. Archived from the original (PDF) on 2024-04-29.
- Williams, Ann (1982). "Princeps Merciorum Gentis: the Family, Career and Connections of Ælfhere, Ealdorman of Mercia". Anglo-Saxon England. 10: 143–72. doi:10.1017/S0263675100003240. ISSN 0263-6751.
- Williams, Ann (1999). Kingship and Government in Pre-Conquest England, c. 500-1066. Basingstoke, UK: Macmillan Press Ltd. ISBN 978-0-312-22090-7.
- Williams, Ann (2003). Æthelred the Unready: The Ill-Counselled King. London, UK: Hambledon and London. ISBN 978-1-85285-382-2.
- Williams, Ann (2004a). "Edmund I (920/21–946)". Oxford Dictionary of National Biography. Oxford University Press. doi:10.1093/ref:odnb/8501. ISBN 978-0-19-861412-8. (subscription, Wikipedia Library access or UK public library membership required)
- Williams, Ann (2004b). "Eadred [Edred] (d. 955)". Oxford Dictionary of National Biography. Oxford University Press. doi:10.1093/ref:odnb/8510. ISBN 978-0-19-861412-8. (subscription, Wikipedia Library access or UK public library membership required)
- Williams, Ann (2004c). "Ælfhere (d. 983)". Oxford Dictionary of National Biography. Oxford University Press. doi:10.1093/ref:odnb/182. ISBN 978-0-19-861412-8. (subscription, Wikipedia Library access or UK public library membership required)
- Williams, Ann (2014). "Edgar (called Edgar Pacificus) (943/4–975)". Oxford Dictionary of National Biography. Oxford University Press. doi:10.1093/ref:odnb/8463.(subscription, Wikipedia Library access or UK public library membership required)
- Thacker, Alan (1988). "Æthelwold and Abingdon". In Yorke, Barbara (ed.). Bishop Æthelwold: His Career and Influence. Woodbridge, UK: The Boydell Press. pp. 43–64. ISBN 978-0-85115-705-4.
- Thomson, Rodney M.; Winterbottom, Michael, eds. (1999). William of Malmesbury: Gesta Regum Anglorum, The History of the English Kings. Vol. II. Oxford, UK: Clarendon Press. ISBN 978-0-19-820682-8.
- Yorke, Barbara (2001). "Edward as Ætheling". In N. J. Higham; D. H. Hill (eds.). Edward the Elder 899–924. Abingdon, Oxfordshire: Routledge. ISBN 978-0-415-21497-1.
- Yorke, Barbara (2003). "The Legitimacy of St Edith". Haskins Society Journal. 11: 97–113. ISSN 0963-4959.
- Yorke, Barbara (2004). "Æthelwold (St Æthelwold, Ethelwold) (904x9–984)". Oxford Dictionary of National Biography. Oxford University Press. doi:10.1093/ref:odnb/8920. (subscription, Wikipedia Library access or UK public library membership required)
- Yorke, Barbara (2004a). "Wulfthryth (St Wulfthryth) (d. c.1000), abbess of Wilton". Oxford Dictionary of National Biography. Oxford University Press. doi:10.1093/ref:odnb/49423. ISBN 978-0-19-861412-8. (subscription, Wikipedia Library access or UK public library membership required)
- Yorke, Barbara (2004b). "Edith [St Edith, Eadgyth] (961x4–984x7)". Oxford Dictionary of National Biography. Oxford University Press. doi:10.1093/ref:odnb/8482. ISBN 978-0-19-861412-8. (subscription, Wikipedia Library access or UK public library membership required)
- Yorke, Barbara (2004c). "Wulfhild [St Wulfhild] (d. after 996)". Oxford Dictionary of National Biography. Oxford University Press. doi:10.1093/ref:odnb/49417. ISBN 978-0-19-861412-8. (subscription, Wikipedia Library access or UK public library membership required)
- Yorke, Barbara (2008). "The Women in Edgar's Life". In Scragg, Donald (ed.). Edgar King of the English, 595-975. Woodbridge, UK: The Boydell Press. pp. 143–57. ISBN 978-1-84383-928-6.
