= Lightfoot =

Lightfoot may refer to:

== Court cases ==
- Gomillion v. Lightfoot, a 1960 United States Supreme Court case ruling that constructing electoral districts for the purpose of denying equal representation to African-Americans is a violation of the Fifteenth Amendment
- Lightfoot v. Cendant Mortgage Corp., a 2017 United States Supreme Court case to determine whether lender Fannie Mae can be sued in state courts

== Entertainment ==
- Lightfoot!, a 1966 album by Gordon Lightfoot
- Light-Foot, a 1959 jazz album by Lou Donaldson
- "Lightfoot", a song by The Guess Who from Wheatfield Soul
- Lightfoot (G.I. Joe), a character in the G.I. Joe universe
- Lightfoot (Transformers), an Autobot from the Transformers fictional series
- Captain Lightfoot, a 1955 film starring Rock Hudson
- Miss Lightfoot, a recurring character in the Disney Channel TV show The Ghost and Molly McGee
- Prince Lightfoot, a unicorn in The Unicorn Chronicles book series

== People ==
- Lightfoot (lacrosse), Native American lacrosse player
- Lightfoot (surname)

== Places ==
- Lightfoot, Virginia
- Lightfoot House, at St Chad's College, Durham, UK
- George M. Lightfoot House, in Washington, D.C., United States
- Lightfoot Mill, an 18th-century grain mill outside Chester Springs, Pennsylvania

== Other uses ==
- Light-foot (measurement), the time taken for light to travel one foot; List of unusual units of measurement#Light-distance
- Operation Lightfoot, part of the Second Battle of El Alamein

== See also ==
- Gary "Litefoot" Davis, American actor and businessman
- Footlight (disambiguation)
