= Footlight (disambiguation) =

A footlight is a theatrical lighting device.

Footlight may also refer to:

- Footlights, an amateur theatrical club based in Cambridge, England
- Footlight (typeface), a serif typeface
- Footlights (film), a 1921 American silent film

== See also ==
- Footlights and Shadows (disambiguation)
- Lightfoot (disambiguation)
