= George Rex =

British-South African Entrepreneur (1765–1839)

Marshal of the Vice Admiralty Court of the Cape
- In office 1797

Registrar of Courts Martial of the Cape
- In office 1797–1801

Advocate for the Crown
- In office 1798

Personal details
- Born: 29 August 1765 Whitechapel, London, England
- Died: 3 April 1839 (aged 73) Knysna, Cape Colony
- Spouse(s): Johanna Rosina Van de Caap; Caroline Margaretha Ungerer
- Children: at least 13
- Parent(s): John Rex & Sarah Creasey (alleged)

George Rex (29 August 1765 – 3 April 1839) was a British-born entrepreneur who spent most of his adult life in the Cape Colony. He founded the town of Knysna, Cape Colony and played a key role in its development. Rex filled a number of positions in the Cape Colony – including Marshal of the Vice-admiralty Court, notary public to the Governor and advocate for the Crown – before settling on the farm Melkhoutkraal, in the Knysna district.

== Biography ==
George Rex was the eldest child of John Rex (1726–1792), a prosperous distiller at Whitechapel, Middlesex, who was Master of the Distillers' Company in 1782, by his wife Sarah Creasey. He was baptised at St Mary Matfelon church, in Whitechapel on 2 September 1765. His brothers and sisters were Sarah Rex (1767–1769), John Rex (1768–1821) a wine and brandy merchant who named his 'late brother George Rex of the Cape of Good Hope' in his will, Sarah Rex (1770–1842) who lived at Bath and corresponded with her brother George, and Elizabeth Rex (1772–1773). John Rex named his son George in his will in 1788, saying 'and in regard I have already advanced my eldest son George Rex very considerably more than I have my other son and daughter'. This was in reference to profits and rents from two lots of land with appurtenances in Plaistow Marsh West Ham, that were in the possession of John Rex. One lot was 4.9 hectares (12 acres). The other was 8,100 square metres (2 acres).

George Rex was articled for seven years to one of the Procurators General of the Court of Arches in 1780 when aged 14 and admitted as Notary Public by the Faculty Office in 1786 when 21. He was a Supernumerary at Doctors' Commons in 1787 and a Proctor there 1789–97. He was appointed Marshal and Sergeant-at-Mace of the newly created Vice-Admiralty Court at the Cape of Good Hope in 1797. He was Registrar of Courts Martial, 1797–1801, and Advocate for the Crown, a position akin to that of a colonial attorney general in 1798. He purchased four slaves in 1799. He was Marshal of the Vice-Admiralty Court, 1800–02. He purchased the homestead Schoonder Zigt (now being run as the Flower Street Guest House in Oranjezicht), Table Valley, Cape Town, in 1800, and asked permission to sell gunpowder taken from a prize of war in 1801. The Vice-Admiralty Court closed in December 1802 and he signed the Oath of Submission to the Batavian Republic in 1803. He sold Schoonder Zigt in 1804 and purchased Melkhout Kraal, Knysna. He had 33 slaves in 1805 and was part-owner of the ship Young Phoenix, 1810–16. He became a timber exporter and trader, having licence for 400 woodcutters in 1811. He was Postmaster of Plettenberg Bay, 1815–20, and held game-shooting licences, 1817–20. He purchased the further loan-farms of Sandkraal, Welbedacht (renamed Eastford), Jackals Kraal, Portland (1817) and Uitzigt (1830), about 97 km^{2} (24,000 acres). He built the yacht Knysna in 1831. He became a man of some influence at the Cape and regularly entertained at his estate distinguished visitors from overseas such as Lord Charles Somerset, the Earl of Caledon, later, Sir Lowry Cole, Christian Ferdinand Friedrich Krauss German scientist, traveller and collector, Jules Verreaux, a French botanist, ornithologist and professional collector of, and trader in, natural history specimens; Prince William Frederick, Duke of Gloucester and Edinburgh also visited for an elephant hunt in the Knysna forest.

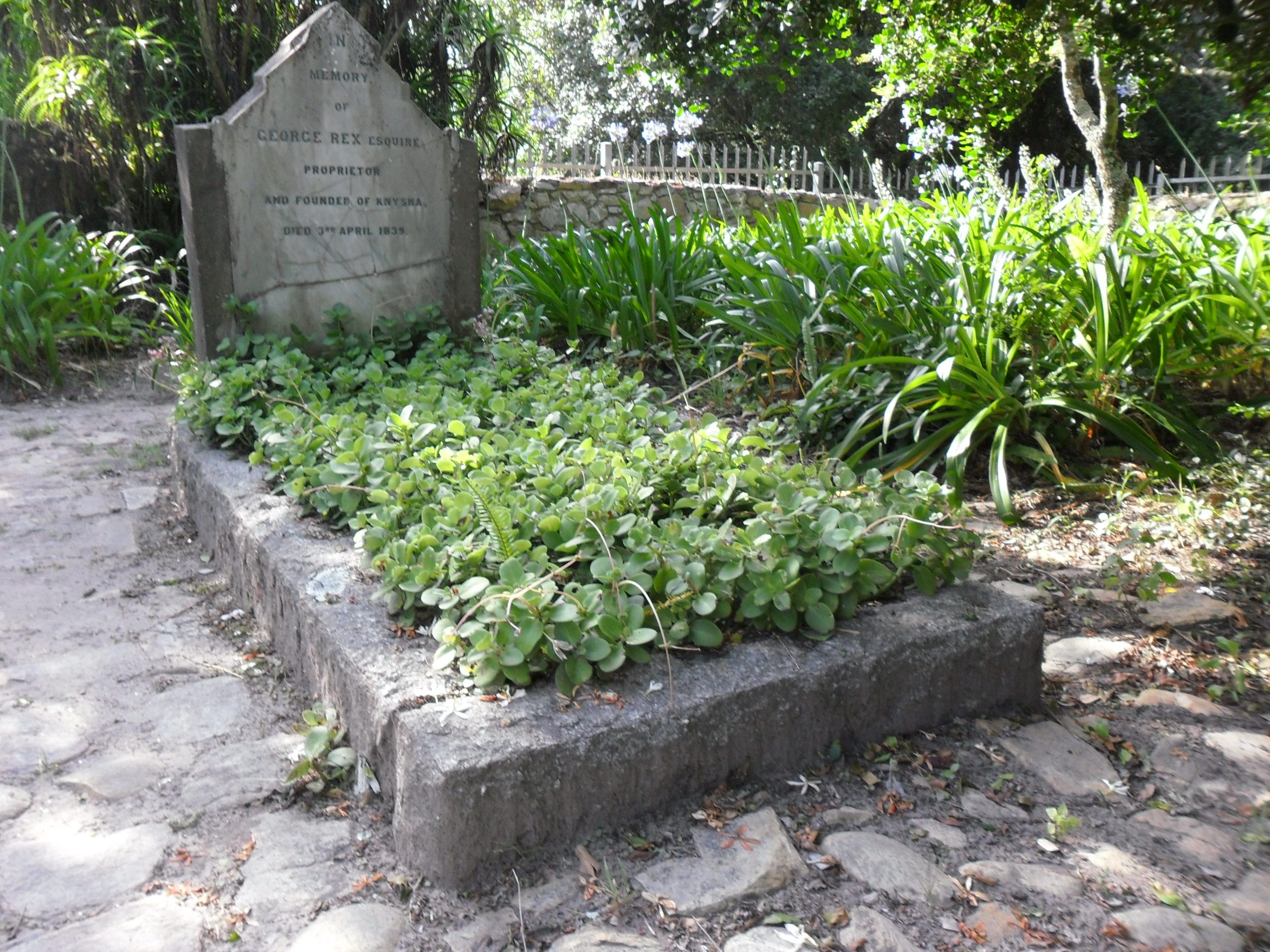
Rex's grave in Knysna

In his will George Rex said that he had not submitted himself to the matrimonial laws of the Colony, but he had four children by a former slave, Johanna Rosina van der Caap, and then nine children by one of her daughters (Carolina Margaretha Ungerer) by a previous master. It is possible that he had married in England before going to South Africa. Rex died on 3 April 1839, and was buried in Lower Old Place, Knysna.

Mabel Malherbe is one of his descendants.

== Alleged royal descent ==
It had often been stated, and was firmly believed by many of his descendants, that George Rex was the son of King George III and Hannah Lightfoot. They believed that he had been banished to the Cape, granted large tracts of land there, and forbidden to marry, a story with many later embellishments, that gained ground in the 1860s following contact with Mrs Lavinia Ryves the daughter of the imposter and forger Olivia Serres (Princess Olive).

Doubt was cast on this theory by Patricia Storrar in "George Rex: Death of a Legend". The possibility of Rex having royal blood was shown to be improbable by Y-DNA genetic testing. Kit 177978 belonging to a male Rex descendant of the Rex of Knysna, South Africa, falls within the Y-DNA group that originates from Norfolk, England, that disproves connections to royalty.
