= James Wilmot =

English clergyman and scholar (1726–1807)

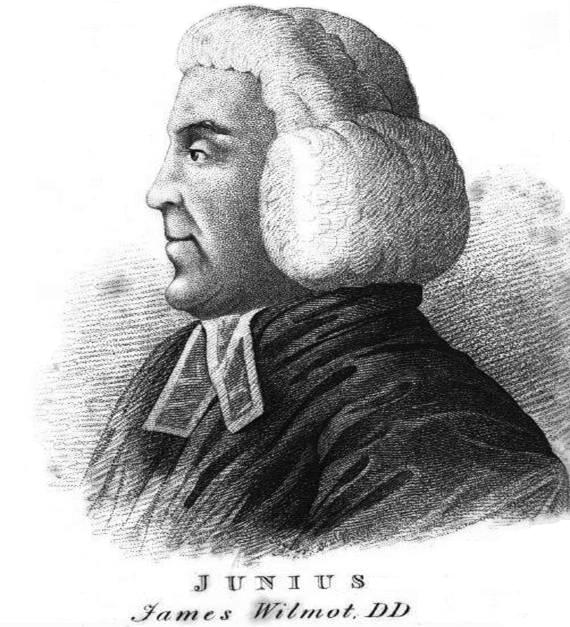
Portrait of James Wilmot from his biography written by his niece.

James Wilmot (1726 in Warwick – 1807 in Barton) was an English clergyman and scholar from Warwickshire. During his lifetime, he was apparently unknown beyond his immediate circle.

After Wilmot's death, his niece, Olivia Serres, claimed that he was the pseudonymous author of the famous Letters of Junius and an influential friend of major writers and politicians. She later also claimed that he had been secretly married to a Polish princess, fathering a daughter by her who had married into the British royal family. Serres asserted that she was the child of this marriage and therefore deserved the title "Princess Olivia".

Furthermore, a document discovered in the early twentieth century appeared to demonstrate that Wilmot had been the earliest proponent of the Baconian theory, the view that Francis Bacon was the author of Shakespeare's works.

All posthumous claims about Wilmot have been disputed. Olivia Serres was a notorious impostor and forger. The manuscript concerning Shakespeare has no known provenance and was probably concocted during the early twentieth century.

== Career ==
James Wilmot was the son of Thomas Wilmot, of the town of Warwick, gent. He studied at Trinity College, Oxford, where he received a Doctorate of Divinity, and of which he became a Fellow. He was appointed to a curacy at Kenilworth and later promoted to the position of rector of Barton-on-the-Heath, fifteen miles from Stratford-upon-Avon, where he remained for the rest of his life and served as a Justice of the Peace.

== Supposed Shakespeare research ==
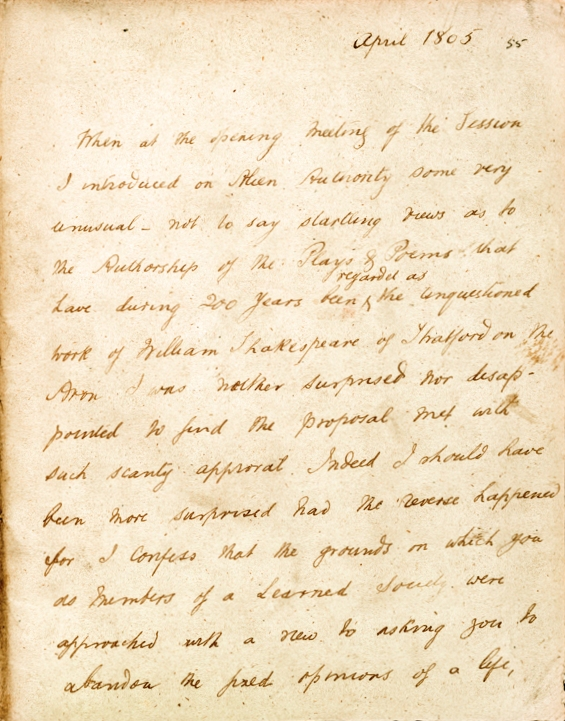
Page from a manuscript purportedly written in 1805 by James Cowell, which has since been determined to be a forgery. MS 294, Senate House Library, University of London

Wilmot's Shakespeare research is said to have been reported in two lectures to the Ipswich Philosophic Society in 1805 by his friend, James Corton Cowell, preserved in a two-part manuscript, "Some reflections on the life of William Shakespeare". The lectures, contained in a "thin quarto volume", were donated to the University of London in 1929 by the widow of the prominent Baconian Sir Edwin Durning-Lawrence (1837–1914) and first made public in 1932. They tell of Wilmot's search for Shakespeare's books or records in country manor libraries within a radius of 50 miles (80 km) of Stratford. According to the "Reflections", by 1781, Wilmot had concluded that Shakespeare could not have authored the works attributed to him and that Sir Francis Bacon had. Nevertheless, concerned that his views might not be taken seriously, Wilmot destroyed all evidence of his theory, confiding his findings only to Cowell.

The authenticity of Cowell's "Reflections" was accepted by Shakespearean scholars for many years. It was even suggested that Wilmot may have written the published pamphlet, The Story of the Learned Pig (1786), which was claimed to hint at a Baconian argument. However, the authenticity of the Cowell manuscript was challenged in 2002-2003 by John Rollett, Daniel Wright and Alan H. Nelson. Rollett could find no historical traces of either Cowell, the Ipswich Philosophic Society, or its supposed president, Arthur Cobbold. Reporting on Rollett's findings, Wright suggested that a Bacon supporter might have forged the manuscript and added it to Durning-Lawrence's archives to revive Bacon's flagging popularity in the face of the Earl of Oxford's ascendancy as the most popular alternative Shakespeare author in the 1920s. However, Wright stopped short of declaring the manuscript a forgery, pending paleographic analysis of the handwriting and dating of the paper. In 2010, James S. Shapiro declared the document a forgery based on facts stated in the text about Shakespeare that were not discovered or publicised until decades after the purported date of composition. Peter Bower, an expert in paper history analysis, identified the paper as drawing paper, not writing paper, probably made shortly after the type was introduced in the mid-1790s. He noted that he knew of no instances of that type of paper being used to write out a long lecture.

== Serres biography ==
Wilmot's biography was written in 1813 by his niece Olivia Serres, who had lived with her bachelor uncle as a child. Serres claimed that Wilmot himself was a pseudonymous author, having written the Letters of Junius, well-known Whig political tracts which defended democratic rights and freedom of speech, whose authorship had been much debated. Serres also asserted that Samuel Johnson admired Wilmot to such a degree that he "submitted his writings to the perusal of Dr Wilmot before their going to the press", and that he was close to the poet laureate Thomas Warton, with whom he exchanged poems. Serres also said that Wilmot knew the novelist Laurence Sterne and influenced leading liberal political figures including John Wilkes and Edmund Burke.

According to Serres, Wilmot fell out with Burke over his treatment of Wilkes, and when Burke demanded that Wilmot burn all their correspondence, Wilmot scrupulously complied. Indeed, Wilmot was so concerned to preserve confidences and his own anonymity that he burned all his papers just before his death, leaving no evidence of his literary and scholarly achievements. Despite this, Serres claimed to have later discovered papers written in "cyphers", which she destroyed, except for one book that contained memoranda proving "beyond contradiction" that Wilmot was Junius.

Serres did not mention any interest that Wilmot may have had in Shakespeare. Rather she asserted that Wilmot's favourite poet was John Milton and that he also admired Alexander Pope and John Dryden. Serres did state that Wilmot was a great admirer of Bacon, writing that "Lord Bacon's works were placed by our author [Wilmot] in his niece's hands at a very early age and he desired her to read his essays very frequently. The editor [Serres] has often imagined from many circumstances that her venerated uncle greatly resembled Lord Bacon in person and mind".

== Alleged marriage ==
In 1817 Olivia Serres concocted an elaborate story to prove that she had royal ancestry. According to Serres, Wilmot had secretly married Princess Poniatowski, sister of King Stanislaus I of Poland, and thus Wilmot was actually her grandfather rather than her uncle. Wilmot had fathered a daughter, Olive, and had officiated at her secret marriage to Prince Henry, the Duke of Cumberland in 1767 at the London house of a nobleman. Serres produced a document signed "James Wilmot" asserting that he had conducted this marriage.

Serres stated that she was the only child of this marriage and that her mother had died "of a broken heart" on the Duke of Cumberland's "second" and "bigamous" marriage to Anne Horton. Serres managed to enlist the support of a Member of Parliament, and the issue was debated in the House of Commons, but her claims were dismissed. The documents produced by Serres were determined to be forgeries, and evidence was provided that Wilmot was in Oxford, as a Fellow of his college, at the time he was supposed to have conducted the marriage and signed the document. The Poniatowski family declared that none of King Stanislaus's sisters had ever been to England. Nevertheless, Serres' daughter, Lavinia Ryves, continued to assert royal descent.
