= John Thomas Serres =

English painter (1759-1825)

John Thomas Serres (December 1759 – 28 December 1825) was an English maritime painter who enjoyed significant success, including exhibiting extensively at the Royal Academy, and was for a time Maritime Painter to King George III.

== Life ==
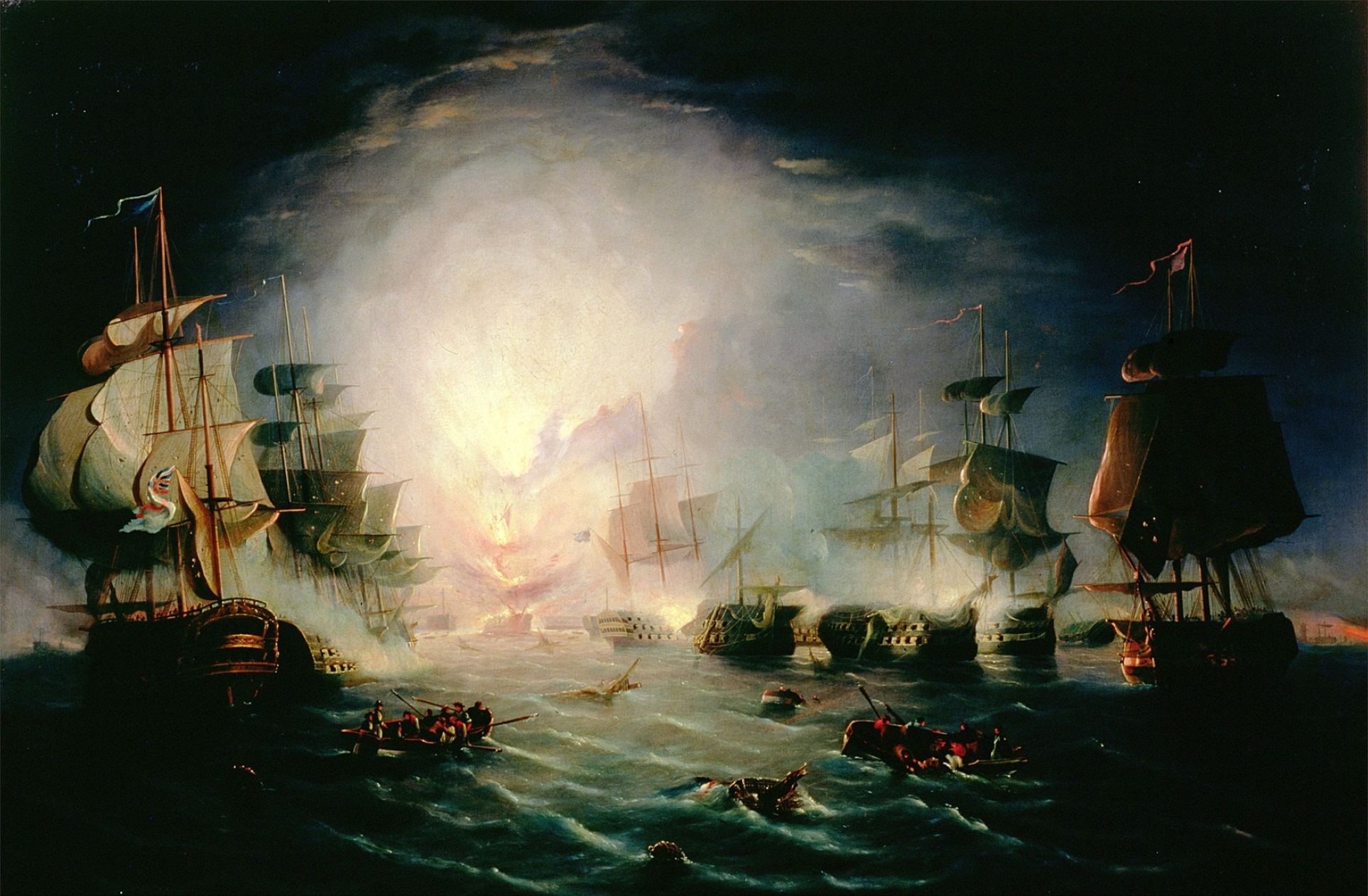
The Blowing up of the French Commander's Ship "L'Orient" at the Battle of the Nile, 1798

John Thomas Serres was born in London in December 1759 to Dominic Serres, a prominent painter and a founder of the Royal Academy. Instructed by his father, John was involved in the publication of the maritime painter's guide Liber Nauticus and the younger Serres had soon developed a successful independent painting career, the Royal Academy and British Institution exhibiting over 100 of his paintings over his lifetime. In 1790-1791 he recorded his impressions in sketches documenting a voyage he made along the French and Italian coasts on a tour taking in Paris, Lyons, Marseilles, Genoa, Pisa, Florence, and Rome, where he passed five months, and then Naples. He also became Master of Drawing at the Royal Naval College in Chelsea and in 1793 was made Marine Painter to the King after his father's death. Serres, already Master Draughtsman to the Admiralty, was assigned as an artist to the Channel Squadron during the blockade of Brest, 1799–1800.

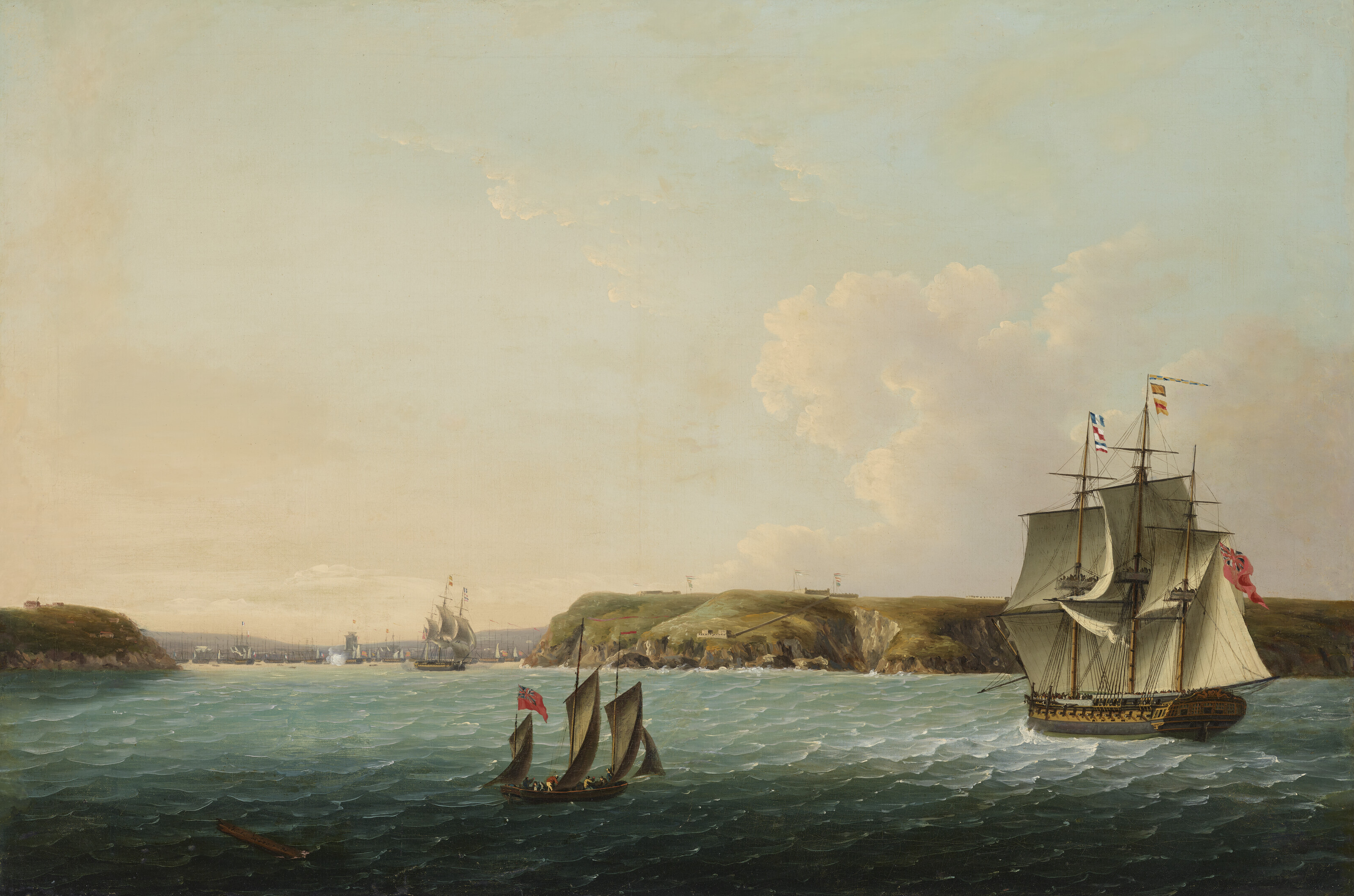
The coast and entrance of Brest, with the HMS Boadicea making signal to a repeating frigate of the number of French and Spanish ships at anchor in the harbor (1801)

Serres' successful career was badly damaged in the early 19th century by the activities of his wife Olivia Serres, who came to believe that she was the illegitimate daughter of Prince Henry, Duke of Cumberland and Strathearn and publicly pressed her "claim" to his estate, insisting on being addressed as "Princess Olive of Cumberland". Consequently, out of favour at court, Serres was forced to attempt to recoup his losses by investing in the theatre, setting up the Royal Coburg Theatre in 1818 that eventually became known as the "Old Vic". However his wife's activities again ruined him and he died in December 1825 in a London debtors' prison. His daughter Lavinia Ryves spent most of her life continuing to unsuccessfully press her mother's "claim" on the estate of King George III, even managing to take it to the House of Lords.
