= Lavinia Ryves =

- Princess Lavinia of Cumberland (disputed)
- Born: 16 March 1797
- Died: 7 December 1871 (aged 74)
- Spouse: Anthony Ryves (m.1822; div.1841)
- Father: John Thomas Serres
- Mother: Olivia Serres

Lavinia Jannetta Horton Ryves (née Serres; 16 March 1797 – 7 December 1871), was a British woman claiming to be a member of the British royal family, calling herself "Princess Lavinia of Cumberland".

Born in Liverpool, England, Lavinia was the daughter of Olivia Serres and John Thomas Serres. Olivia Serres gained notoriety by claiming to be the daughter of Prince Henry, Duke of Cumberland and Strathearn, a younger brother of King George III. In 1822 Lavinia married Anthony Ryves, a portrait painter. They were divorced in 1841.

In 1844 "Princess Lavinia" tried to take Arthur Wellesley, 1st Duke of Wellington to court for having "overlooked", as George III's executor, a bequest of £15,000 to Olivia. In 1850 Lavinia published a pamphlet requesting financial aid from Queen Victoria.

In 1866, aged sixty-nine, Princess Lavinia asked the Court of Probate to declare her the legitimate granddaughter of the Duke of Cumberland and award her the £15,000 bequest "left" by George III. In the process of the 1866 trial, Lavinia produced several remarkable documents attesting to her claims, and a handwriting expert testified to the authenticity of George III's and James Wilmot's signatures. Testimony was introduced that in fact the Duke of Kent had supported Olivia financially, and had spoken of Olivia as "my cousin Serres", apparently believing her story.

The trial was considered most remarkable, perhaps, for the claims made by Dr. Walter Smith, Lavinia's barrister, that George III had been privately married to a Quaker, Hannah Lightfoot, and that in consequence thereof, neither George IV nor Queen Victoria had any right to the throne.

Lavinia's case, however, quickly ran into difficulties: in some of the submitted documents, George III had "signed" his name as "George Guelph"; in others, William Pitt and Lord Brook had "signed" as earls before they had in fact become earls.

The court found that Lavinia was the legitimate daughter of John and Olivia Serres and was not the granddaughter of the Duke of Cumberland. The court did not prosecute Lavinia for forgery: Lavinia maintained she believed in good faith that the documents left her by Olivia were genuine. It is thought that the documents were in fact forged at the behest of Olivia, rather than Lavinia, perhaps by William FitzClarence, Olivia's boyfriend, who had calligraphic talents.

Lavinia continued to write pamphlets in support of her claims, and her case was reheard by the House of Lords. She died with her claims unrecognized.
