= Cyril Roy Hart =

Amateur historian of Anglo-Saxon England

Cyril Roy Hart (born 1923) is an amateur historian of Anglo-Saxon England. He is a retired general practitioner who published books and articles on medical subjects, but who is mainly known for his extensive contributions to Anglo-Saxon history.

Hart was born on 16 May 1923 at his grandparents' home, 12 Benson Avenue, East Ham, an eastern suburb of London.

After Hart had qualified as a physician, he turned to the serious study of history and gained a master's degree at Leicester University under the supervision of Herbert Finberg. He published several studies of Anglo-Saxon charters which, in the view of Simon Keynes and Alfred Smyth, secured him a reputation on a par with leading professional historians. He went on to publish The Danelaw, described by Keynes and Smyth as "a monumental work running to 700 pages of immensely detailed scholarship". In their view his researches "have revolutionised our understanding of Anglo-Saxon history". In 2006 leading historians published a festschrift in his honour. He is an M.A., an M.B., a D.Litt and an F.R.Hist.S.

== Select bibliography ==
Hart's works are listed in the festschrift.

- The Early Charters of Eastern England, 1966
- The Early Charters of Essex, 1971
- 'Athelstan Half-King and his Family', Anglo-Saxon England, 1973 (The Danelaw has an updated version of this article)
- The Early Charters of Northern England and the North Midlands, 1975
- The Danelaw, 1992
- The Autobiobiography and Personal Philosophy of a Retired Physician, 1998
- Learning and Culture in Late Anglo-Saxon England and the Influence of Ramsey Abbey on the Major English School, 2 vols, 2003
- Chronicles of the Reign of Æthelred the Unready, 2006
- Entries in the Oxford Dictionary of National Biography, 2004

== Sources ==
- Hart, Cyril (1975). The Early Charters of Northern England and the North Midlands. Leicester, UK: Leicester University Press. ISBN 978-0-7185-1131-9.
- Hart, Cyril Roy (1998). An autobiography and personal philosophy of a retired physician. Lewiston, NY: Edwin Mellen Press. ISBN 978-0-88946-216-8.
- Keynes, Simon; Smyth, Alfred P., eds. (2006). Anglo-Saxons: Studies Presented to Cyril Roy Hart. Dublin, Ireland: Four Courts Press. ISBN 978-1-85182-932-3.
