= Hannah Lightfoot =

English Quaker

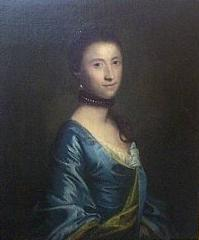
- Born: 1730
- Died: 1759 (aged 28–29)
- Spouse: Issac Axford (m. 1753)
- Parents: Matthew Lightfoot (father); Mary Wheeler (mother)

Hannah Lightfoot (12 October 1730 – before December 1759), known as "The Fair Quaker", was a Quaker in Westminster. She married Isaac Axford in December 1753 but, before the end of the following year, had disappeared. Later gossip, originally in amusement and ridicule, first noted in print in 1770, but much embroidered in the late eighteenth and early nineteenth centuries linked her name, although some eight years his senior, with the extremely shy fifteen-year-old Prince George. Prince George became King George III in 1760 and was known to admire the simplicity of the Quakers. After George's death, rumours circulated that he had engineered her abduction, married and had children by her. However, no contemporary source connecting the Prince and Hannah has ever been found.

== Biography ==
Hannah Lightfoot was born into a Quaker family in St John, now Shadwell, Wapping, Middlesex, now E1, the daughter of Matthew Lightfoot (died 1733), a shoemaker, and his wife Mary Wheeler (died 1760). After the death of her father she lived with her uncle Henry Wheeler, a linen draper in Market Lane, Westminster.

She married (apparently without the knowledge of her mother) outside her faith at Keith's Chapel, Curzon Street, Mayfair, on 11 December 1753, Isaac Axford, grocer, of St Martin Ludgate, London. She had absconded from her husband by 1 January 1755, but it was reported on 3 September 1755 that her mother 'was not fully satisfied she was absented from her husband'. The officials of her church reported on 7 January 1756 that she could not be found and agreed that a Testimony of Denial be prepared against her for marrying against their rules. This was read and approved on 3 March 1756. She had been bequeathed £50 by her aunt Hannah Plant in 1748 which she should have received on probate, 9 March 1756.

As 'Mrs Hannah Axford formerly Miss Hannah Lightfoot' she was bequeathed an annuity of £40 for life by Robert Pearne of Isleworth, an old friend of the family, in his will dated 26 January 1757 and proved 4 April 1757. Hannah was also mentioned in the will of her mother Mary Lightfoot dated 10 January 1760 and proved 4 June 1760 in which she left the residue of her estate in trust for Hannah, adding 'I am not certain whether my said daughter be living or dead I not having seen or heard from her for about two years last past'.

Hannah's husband Isaac Axford remarried in Wiltshire, describing himself as a widower, in December 1759, but he may not have known whether Hannah was dead or alive. His second wife, Mary Bartlett, died in 1791, and he himself died at Warminster in 1816.

== Allegations ==
George III admired the simple goodness of the Quakers and there is an old story, first published in 1770 but much embellished in the nineteenth century, that, in amusement, linked his name, as an extremely shy teenager of fifteen, with that of Hannah Lightfoot, eight years his senior, who ran away from her husband in 1754 and disappeared. The King, then Prince of Wales, is said to have organised her abduction at or after her marriage to Isaac Axford in 1753 and, according to later stories, to have secretly married and had children by her; two of them were known to history as George Rex (now known to have been born in 1765) and John Mackelcan, born in 1759. Her whereabouts were unknown to her family by 1758. Her husband married again in 1759 describing himself as a widower.

Just a month before the Testimony of Denial was issued against Hannah Lightfoot, the young Prince of Wales had seen a Quaker at a masquerade at Northumberland House. If noted and remarked upon at the time it may account for the story which then arose. In December 1759 the gossips were saying that the Prince had kept a beautiful Quaker for some years, that she had died, and that a child survived. When he visited Quakers in the City in 1761 the joke was that he had been 'thoroughly initiated and instructed by the fairest of the Quaker sisterhood'. And so the story grew. Hannah was advertised for in 1793, apparently without success.

However, the story gained strength and much dubious detail with the publication of the anonymous An Historical Fragment Relative to Her late Majesty Queen Caroline (1824), the anonymous Authentic Records of the Court of England (1831–2) and the Secret History of the Court of England (1832) in which it was stated that a marriage between Prince George and Hannah Lightfoot had taken place in the Curzon Street Chapel on 17 April 1759. Such a marriage would have bastardised the children of George III and given any child of his brother the Duke of Cumberland a claim to the throne. The imposter Olivia Serres, who claimed to be a legitimate child of the Duke, forged a succession of documents to prove these events, including this 1759 marriage.

When Olive's daughter "Princess Lavinia" produced these documents in court in 1866 the case was dismissed, the Lord Chief Justice saying 'I believe them to be rank and gross forgeries' and the Attorney General declaring her action as 'a case of fraud, fabrication, and imposture from beginning to end'. The documents are now in The National Archives at Kew (reference J77/44).

Although not accepted by any academic historian these claims are sometimes still asserted: see Kreps in references below.

== Portrait ==
The above portrait, which is attributed to Sir Joshua Reynolds, has been linked without proof to Hannah Lightfoot. A guide to the pictures at Knole published in 1839 attributed another painting of Hannah Lightfoot by Reynolds and followed an earlier guide of 1817 in describing the sitter as 'Miss Axford, the Fair Quakeress'. It is a portrait of a woman of fashion (not a Quaker) and it has been suggested that in view of the early uncertainties surrounding the name of the 'fair Quaker' that it may be a portrait of a member of the prosperous Axford family, who were not Quakers, and was later wrongly attributed. It may be a portrait of Miss Ann Axford, a sister of William and John Axford, of Ludgate Hill, grocers, who was alive in 1780.

== Cultural references ==
Four novels have been based on the Hannah Lightfoot story.

- A Fountain Sealed: 1897. A historical novel by Sir Walter Besant in which Hannah Lightfoot is the narrator
- The Prince and the Quakeress, Jean Plaidy, Hale, London, 1968, ISBN 0709103816
- Kingdom of Lies, Lee Wood, St. Martin's Minotaur, New York, 2005, ISBN 0-312-34030-3. A mystery novel, set in contemporary times, based on the Hannah Lightfoot story.
- The King's Secret Daughter 2017 A historical fiction novel by K.M. Ellis, features the fictional illegitimate daughter of Hannah Lightfoot and George III. ISBN 978-1520889719
- In Series 14, Episode 1 of the Australian version of the TV Series "Who Do You Think You Are?", filmed before his death in 2023, comedian Barry Humphries (aka Dame Edna) is shown to be related to Hannah Lightfoot. He visits the English country house at Knole where the portrait by Reynolds of "Mrs Axford" hangs.
