= Footlights and Shadows =

Footlights and Shadows may refer to:

- Hitch Hike to Heaven, also known as Footlights and Shadows, a 1936 American drama film
- Footlights and Shadows (1920 film), a lost American silent drama film
