= George M. Lightfoot =

American classics scholar (1868–1947)

- Born: George Morton Lightfoot; December 25, 1868; Culpeper, Virginia, U.S.
- Died: December 24, 1947 (aged 77); Washington, D.C., U.S.
- Education: Williams College (BA), Catholic University of America (MA)
- Spouse: Susie Fry (m. 1916–1947; his death)
- Children: 3

George Morton Lightfoot Sr. (December 25, 1868 – December 24, 1947) was an American classics scholar, and educator. He taught at Howard University from 1891 until 1939, where he served as the chair of the Department of Latin; and his former residency is named after him, the historic George M. Lightfoot House in Washington, D.C..

== Life and career ==
George Morton Lightfoot was born on December 25, 1868, in Culpeper, Virginia. His parents were Letetia B. and James M. Lightfoot, his father worked as a farmer in the Blue Ridge Mountains. He remained in Culpeper for childhood and studied under Enoch H. Grasty (Grastie), who had attended Howard University. As a teenager in the Fall of 1888 he moved to Washington, D.C. to attend black public schools, and later Howard University Academy.

He received a B.A. degree in 1891 from Williams College in Williamstown, Massachusetts; and received a M.A. degree in 1922 in Latin from the Catholic University of America in Washington, D.C.

Lightfoot became a instructor at Howard University in 1891, and in 1912, he became a Latin professor. He served as the chair of the Department of Latin before his retirement in 1939. He taught many subject including French, German, and mathematics, but he was particularly good in Classics. Lightfoot organized the Howard University's Classical Club, and was a member of the American Classical League, and the Classical Association of the Atlantic States.

He died at age 77 on December 24, 1947, at his home in Washington, D.C.

== Publications ==
- Lightfoot, George Morton (1922). The Question of the Origin of the Roman Satire. Dissertations and Theses, Catholic University of America. Catholic University of America.
