= George M. Lightfoot House =

Historic house in Washington, D.C.

- U.S. National Register of Historic Places
- D.C. Inventory of Historic Sites
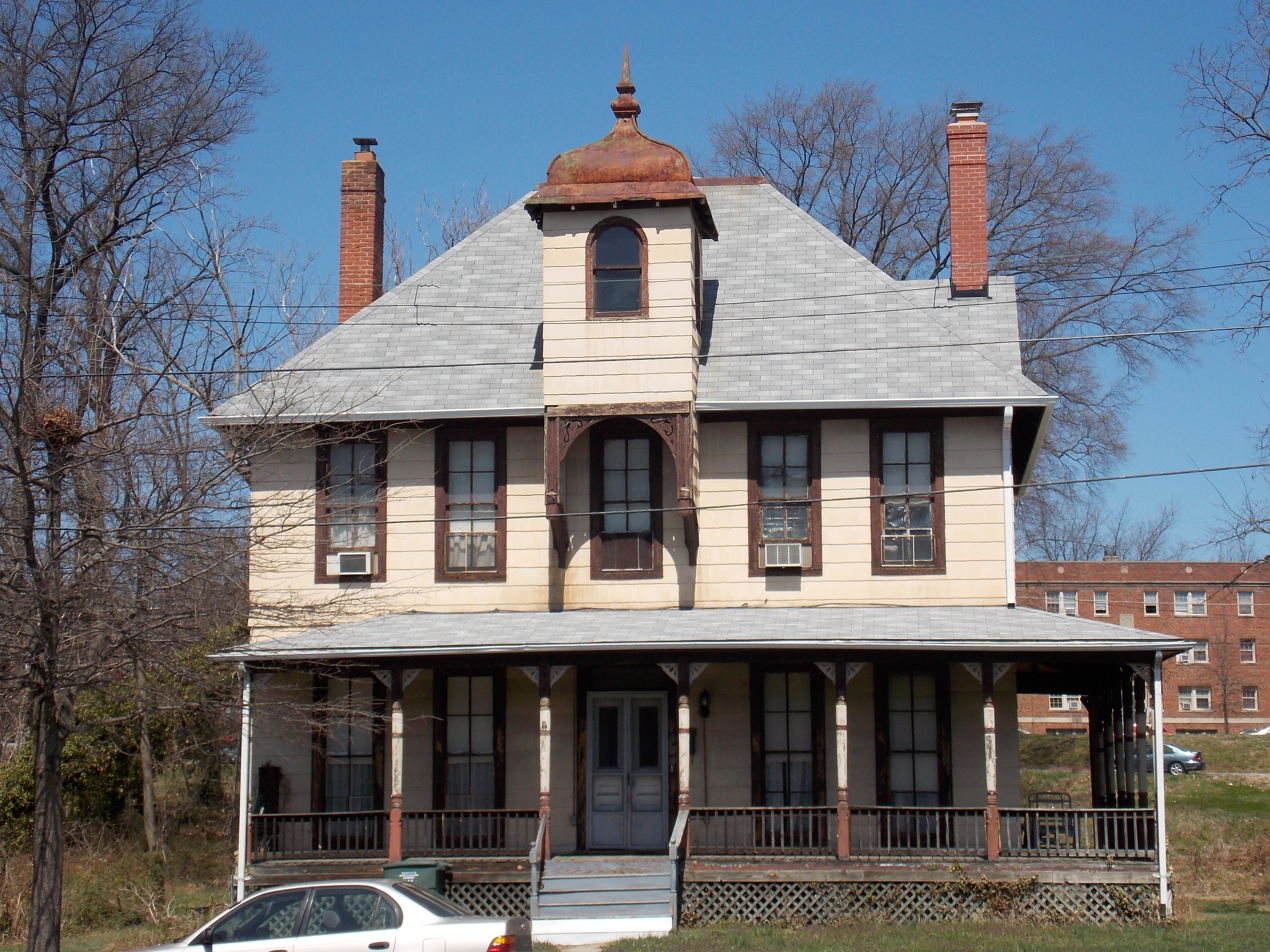
- George M. Lightfoot House in 2014

- Location within District of Columbia
- Location: 1329 Missouri Ave., NW, Washington, D.C., United States
- Coordinates: 38.96195°N 77.030879°W
- Built: 1892
- NRHP reference No.: 13001070

Significant dates
- Added to NRHP: January 15, 2014
- Designated DCIHS: June 27, 2013

The George M. Lightfoot House is a historic single family residence, located in the Brightwood neighborhood of Washington, D.C.

It has been listed on the D.C. Inventory of Historic Sites since June 27, 2013; and listed on the National Register of Historic Places since January 15, 2014; for its significance to architecture as one of the oldest homes in the area, contributions to African American history, and community.

== History ==
The house was built in 1892 by English-born Frederick Bex, a Brightwood carriage maker. The house is located on the north side of Missouri Avenue between Georgia Avenue and 14th Street in the Brightwood neighborhood of northwest Washington, D.C. It is a 19th–century two-story, five-bay frame building with Victorian architectural details. It has a Moorish-style oriel tower.

The second home owner was George Morton Lightfoot (1868–1947), a Black noted Classics professor at Howard University. It has been named after Lightfoot because he was an owner for longer, starting as early as 1917; and because of Lightfoot's connection to the neighboring African American community, of which many participated in salons in this home. The Brightwood neighborhood was one of the first neighborhoods that free Black people moved into, and George M. Lightfoot House is one of the original homes in the neighborhood. According to the National Park Service, the George M. Lightfoot House also represents African American homeownership, at a time when few Black Americans were able to purchase large homes in the suburban areas of Washington, D.C.

== See also ==
- National Register of Historic Places listings in the upper NW Quadrant of Washington, D.C.
