= Mickey Lightfoot =

British musician

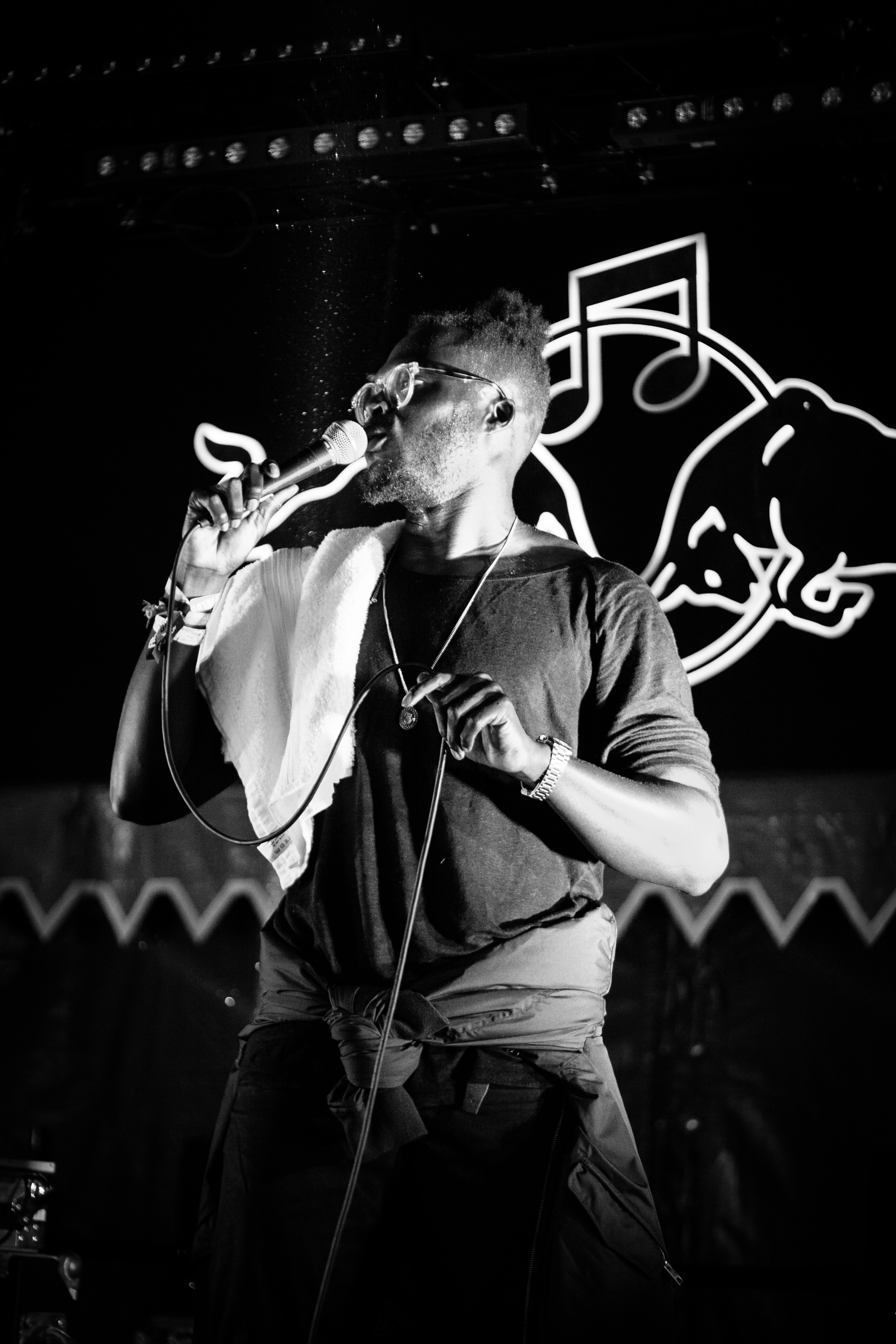

Background information
- Origin: London, England
- Genres: Alternative hip hop, experimental hip hop, electronic, soul, grime, Afrobeats
- Instruments: Vocals, keyboard, bass, guitar
- Years active: 2011–present
- Members: Osei, Akara The Music, Neil White
- Website: thisisml.com

Mickey Lightfoot, whose real name is Osei Amponsa, is an English rapper, singer-songwriter, musician and producer. His music is a blend of future hip-hop, afrobeats and alternative grime. Lightfoot released his EP To Kill A Flockin Bird on Peckish in 2013 that featured Darq E Freaker and Azekel and led to mixes for BBC Radio 1. Lightfoot, along with Neneh Cherry, was named one of "10 Artists to watch in 2014" by New York's cultural influencers Afropunk.

== Early life ==
Mickey Lightfoot was born in Brockley, South London to Ghanaian parents. His mother Comfort Akuse was a seamstress for Vivienne Westwood at one point and his father Alex Amponsah was a pioneering West African political radical. Despite showing a strong interest in football and music during his school years, he pursued studies in science, and graduated with a degree in Physiology and Pharmacology from Bristol University.

== Early career ==
Mickey Lightfoot sought refuge in Bristol. There he promoted club nights which led to music making. He was later accepted into the Red Bull Music Academy, an establishment that boast an alumni that includes the likes of Flying Lotus, Evian Christ and Hudson Mohawke. Some of his early releases resulted in coverage by the British publication The Guardian Since then, the live set up has organically grown to include Akara The Music and Neil White, former bass player for Canadian band The Carps.

== Artistry ==
James Elliott, writing for Earmilk, described Lightfoot's musical style as being based in hip hop, blended with sounds from the garage, grime, electronic music, and R&B that bridges a gap between soul and rap. Sonically hefty, it requires careful listening, challenging why some listeners put strict categories in place for music. Lightfoot has said that Afrocentrism is the skeleton of everything he does.

== Influences ==
His influences range from Tricky-esque quirkiness to Andre 3000 style glamour.

Mickey Lightfoot combines Ghanaian highlife influences with UK grime tendencies incorporating the 90's hip hop and the garage influences from formative years.

== Releases ==
To Kill A Flockin Bird was released digitally on 6 October 2013 on Peckish. The EP was well received across tastemaker blogs such as Hypetrack. and Rankin's Hunger TV.

== Appearances ==
In June 2014, Lightfoot appeared at the Plissken Festival in Athens, Greece, and in June he appeared at the Lunatic Festival in Lüneburg, Germany, and also played Field Day festival that same year. Past performances include Sonar Festival as well as SXSW.

== Other work ==
Lightfoot has writing credits for producer Adamski. He has also assisted M.I.A, Brandt Brauer Frick, Om'mas Keith, The Cool Kids and Bok Bok.

== Discography ==
=== Singles ===
| Title | Year | Peak chart positions | | | | Album |
|---|---|---|---|---|---|---|
| "L.O.S.T" | 2013 | – | — | — | — | Non-album single |

=== EPs ===
| Title | Year | Peak chart positions | | | | Album |
|---|---|---|---|---|---|---|
| To Kill A Flockin Bird EP | 2013 | – | — | — | — | EP |
