= Robert Lightfoot =

Robert Lightfoot may refer to:

- Robert Lightfoot (priest) (1883–1953), Anglican priest and theologian
- Robert Lightfoot (speedway rider) (born 1963), British former speedway rider
- Robert M. Lightfoot Jr. (born 1963), acting administrator of the National Aeronautics and Space Administration (NASA)
- Robert Lightfoot, Professor at Texas A&M University in the Department of Computer Science and Engineering.
