= Teddy Lightfoot =

English footballer

Personal information
- Full name: Edward John Lightfoot
- Date of birth: 13 November 1889
- Place of birth: Litherland, England
- Date of death: 20 July 1918 (aged 28)
- Place of death: Esquelbecq, France
- Position: Left half

Senior career*
Years	Team	Apps	(Gls)
- Harrowby
- Southport Central
1911–1915	Tottenham Hotspur	61	(2)
- * Club domestic league appearances and goals

Edward John Lightfoot (13 November 1889 – 20 July 1918) was an English footballer who played for Harrowby, Southport Central and Tottenham Hotspur.

== Football career ==
Lightfoot signed for Tottenham Hotspur after spells with Harrowby and Southport. The left half featured in 66 matches and scored twice in all competitions between 1911 and 1915.

== First World War ==
Lightfoot was one of several former and current (at that time) Spurs players who died in action in World War I. In early 1916, Lightfoot joined the Royal Garrison Artillery, reaching the rank of sergeant. He died at 1st Australian Casualty Clearing Station in Esquelbecq on 20 July 1918; the cause of his death is unknown. Lightfoot is buried at the Esquelbecq Military Cemetery.

Perseus writing in the Lancashire Daily Post paid the following tribute:

Edward Lightfoot was a splendid footballer but, more than that, he was a good sportsman and a player that respected both himself and his opponents. He has joined a noble company who will leave a big void in football.
