= Olivia Serres =

British artist and impostor (1772–1834)

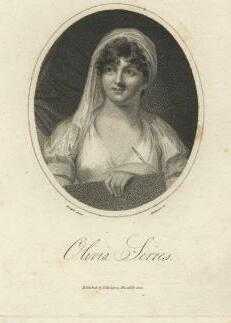
- Born: 3 April 1772
- Died: 21 November 1834 (aged 62)
- Title: Princess Olive of Cumberland (disputed)
- Spouse: John Thomas Serres (m. 1791 div. 1804)
- Children: Lavinia Ryves
- Parent: Robert Wilmot

Olivia Serres (3 April 1772 – 21 November 1834), known as Olive, was a British painter and writer, born in Warwick. She is also known as an English impostor who claimed the title of Princess Olive of Cumberland.

== Origins and early career ==
Olive was born Olivia Wilmot, the daughter of Robert Wilmot, a house painter, in Warwick. At the age of ten she was sent to board with her uncle, James Wilmot, rector of Barton-on-the-Heath. In 1789, she rejoined her father in London. She had a talent for painting and studied art with John Thomas Serres, (1759–1825), marine painter to George III, and she married Serres in 1791. They had two daughters. Olive exhibited her paintings at the Royal Academy of Arts and the British Institution, but was financially reckless; both she and her husband were imprisoned for debt. The Serres came to a parting of the ways, with acrimony on both sides: from Serres because Olive had had several affairs when he was away, and from Olive because she was given an allowance of only £200 per annum. George Fields, an artist friend, moved in with Olive and she gave birth to his son prior to her divorce in 1804. She then devoted herself to painting and literature, producing a novel, some poems and a memoir of her uncle, the Rev. Dr Wilmot, in which she endeavoured to prove that he was the author of the Letters of Junius.

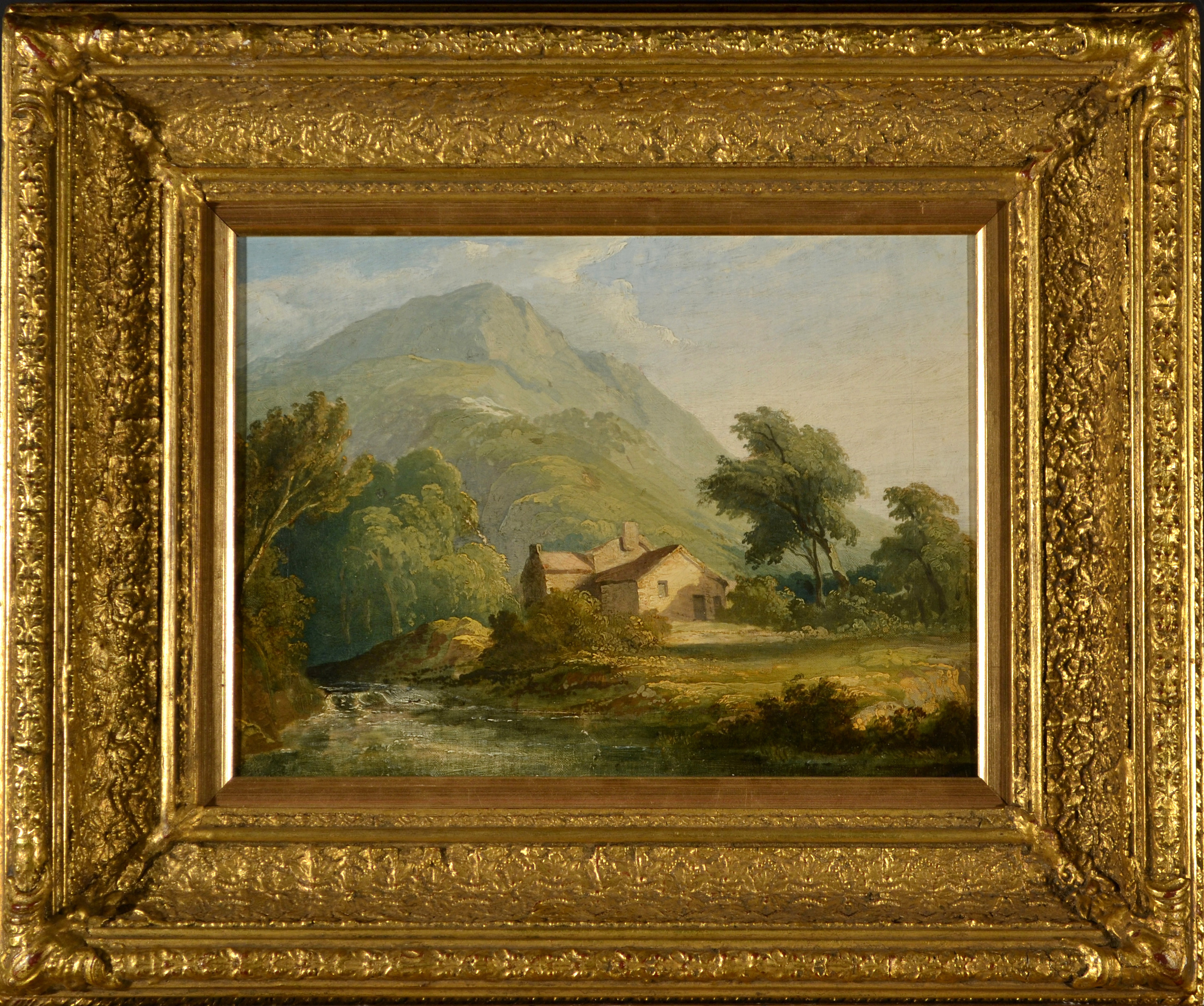
"Stone House beneath the Mountains" - a painting by Serres

== Claims to royalty ==
In 1817, Olive wrote a letter to the Prince Regent, claiming that she was the natural daughter of Prince Henry, Duke of Cumberland by Mrs. Olive Payne (who was James Wilmot's sister and her actual aunt). She asked the prince for financial support. In a petition to George III, she put forward her claim to be the natural daughter of the Duke of Cumberland, the king's brother.

In 1820, after her father, her uncle, and King George III had died, she revised her story. James Wilmot, she claimed, had secretly married the Princess Poniatowski, sister of King Stanislaus II of Poland, and their daughter had married the Duke of Cumberland in 1767 at the London house of a nobleman. Olive claimed to be the only child of this marriage, and that her mother had died "of a broken heart" on the Duke of Cumberland's "second" and "bigamous" marriage to Anne Horton.

She herself, ten days after her birth, was, she alleged, taken from her mother, and substituted for the still-born child of Robert Wilmot. According to Olive Serres, King George III had learned the truth and had given her £5000 in cash and a yearly pension of £500 for life. She also claimed to have received support from the king of Poland and to have been created the Duchess of Lancaster by George III in May 1773, which, she said, entitled her to the income of the Duchy of Lancaster. In a memorial to George IV, she assumed the title of Princess Olive of Cumberland, placed the royal arms on her carriage and dressed her servants in the royal liveries.

== Defending her claims ==
Olivia Serres's claim was supported by documents, and she bore sufficient resemblance to her alleged father to be able to impose on numerous gullible people. In 1821, she had herself rebaptized as the daughter of the Duke of Cumberland at St Mary's Church, Islington, and "announced" her parentage in several letters to the newspapers and in pamphlets. She actually succeeded in obtaining some courtesies in response to her claims of royal status, such as being permitted to pass through the Constitution Gate.

The same year, however, she was arrested again for debt and placed in the King's Bench Prison. She appealed to the public for contributions, placing posters reading "The Princess of Cumberland in Captivity!" all over London, and publishing, in 1822, further details of her claims. On her release, she had an affair with Sheriff J. W. Parkins, a London eccentric, who turned against her when she failed to honour her debts to him. She next had an affair with a young man who called himself William Henry FitzClarence, who claimed to be an illegitimate son of the Duke of Clarence.

Olive managed to persuade Sir Gerard Noel, a member of Parliament, to make inquiry into her claims, but by this time the royal family was fighting back. They located her birth certificate, and obtained a statement by Robert Wilmot stating that he was her natural and lawful father, and a statement from Princess Poniatowski that none of King Stanislaus's sisters had ever been to England. In 1823, Sir Robert Peel, then Home Secretary, speaking in Parliament, responded to Noel's speech in Olive's favour with a denunciation of her documents as forgeries and her story as a fabrication. It was concluded that her claims were false, but Olive escaped prosecution for forgery.

Her husband, who had never given her pretensions any support, expressly denied his belief in them in his will. Olive continued to have money problems and was for the rest of her life in and out of debtors' prisons. In 1830, she again published a pamphlet staking a claim on royalty.

== Suppressed book ==
Serres became friendly with Lady Anne Hamilton, who had been lady-in-waiting to Queen Caroline, and gained her confidence. In 1832 Lady Anne wrote a history called "The Authentic Records of the Court of England for the Last Seventy Years", which contained many accusations of scandals. The publisher, J. Phillips, was prosecuted and convicted but fled into exile. Serres has been identified as the author of an expanded version of the text which included more scandals, from financial malpractice up to murder; the resulting book was published in two volumes under the title "The Secret History of the Court of England", but still claiming that Lady Anne Hamilton was the author. For her part, Lady Anne disclaimed any connection with the two volume publication. "The Secret History of the Court of England" was suppressed in the United Kingdom, a fact noted when it was much reprinted in the United States.

Serres died on 21 November 1834 leaving two daughters.

== Elder daughter ==
Her elder daughter married Antony Ryves, a portrait painter. She upheld her mother's claims and styled herself Princess Lavinia of Cumberland. In 1866 she took her case into court, producing all the documents on which her mother had relied, but the jury, without waiting to hear the conclusion of the reply for the crown, unanimously declared the signatures to be forgeries.

== Analysis ==
Serres' pretensions have been called the result of an absurd vanity. Between 1807 and 1815 she had made the acquaintance of some members of the royal family. From this time onward, she is claimed to have been obsessed with the idea of raising herself, at all costs, to their social level. The tale once invented, she brooded so continuously over it that she may have ended by believing it herself.
