= Cultural depictions of George III =

George III has featured in many examples of popular culture.

== Theatre and opera ==
The 1969 music theatre piece Eight Songs for a Mad King by Sir Peter Maxwell Davies depicts the increasing madness and eventual death of the king as he talks to birds. George's insanity is the subject of the 1986 radio play In the Ruins by Nick Dear (adapted for the stage in 1990 with Patrick Malahide as George) and the 1991 play The Madness of George III by Alan Bennett (with Nigel Hawthorne as George in the premiere production, for which he received the Laurence Olivier Award). Dear's play centres on George looking back on his life in 1817 (the year before his death), whilst Bennett's concerns George's first bout of insanity in late 1788 and early 1789, which those in the royal court, including his own son, use as a way to sidestep regal authority. Hawthorne reprised his role in the film version of the play.

George appears as a comic relief character in the Broadway musical Hamilton (played by Jonathan Groff in the original Broadway cast) to sing three short musical numbers. Euan Morton took over the role in July 2017 and played King George until September 2023, making him the longest-serving actor in the role on Broadway with over six years in the part. Here, he is depicted as a cross between a scorned lover and a manchild who lightheartedly comments on the start of the American Revolutionary War, its aftermath, and finally John Adams' succession as President of the United States. He also appears briefly during the song "The Reynolds Pamphlet", seen silently throwing around copies of the title document. While most of the play's songs are in the style of hip-hop, R&B, contemporary pop, or soul, George's numbers mimic the popular music of the British Invasion.

George appears as Prince of Wales and later king in the play Mr Foote's Other Leg by Ian Kelly (who played George in the play's premiere production in 2015).

== Literature ==
King George III appears in the following novels:

- The Prince and the Quakeress (1968) as well as The Third George (1969) by Jean Plaidy (being the fourth and fifth novels of her Georgian Saga series). The former novel tells the story of George III as a young Prince of Wales and his supposed relationship with Hannah Lightfoot, and then in the latter novel is of his life married to Charlotte and his role as king.
- The Dirk Gently series and Life, the Universe and Everything (1982) by Douglas Adams; in the latter, the character Arthur Dent refers to trees as "those things people think you're mad if you talk to? Like George the Third".
- Jonathan Strange & Mr. Norrell (2004) by Susanna Clarke, where the character of Jonathan Strange attempts to cure him
- Victory of Eagles (2008) by Naomi Novik, where he is encountered by William Laurence, the protagonist, while on an errand in Edinburgh Castle.
- George III appears in the novel God Save the King (2012) by Laura Purcell. The book was later published in the United States under the title Queen of Bedlam.
- A Darker Shade of Magic (2015) by V. E. Schwab and its sequel A Gathering of Shadows (2016) when the Antari Kell visits him (and George IV of the United Kingdom) while in Gray London.

== Film ==
On film, George has been portrayed by:

- Arthur Donaldson in America (1924)
- Henry Mowbray in The Pursuit of Happiness (1934)
- Olaf Hytten in The Bill of Rights (1939, Short)
- Raymond Lovell in The Young Mr. Pitt (1942)
- Frederick Valk in Mrs. Fitzherbert (1947), based on the novel by Winifred Carter
- Robert Morley in Beau Brummell (1954), based on a play by Clyde Fitch
- Eric Pohlmann in John Paul Jones (1959)
- Roger Booth in Barry Lyndon (1975), based on the novel by William Makepeace Thackeray
- Nigel Hawthorne in The Madness of King George (1994), for which he was nominated for the Academy Award for Best Actor, based on the play The Madness of George III, in the premiere production of which George was also played by Hawthorne
- Robin Soans in the Spanish comedy Sabotage! (2000)
- Dave Reitze in the American video Kidz History: The Revolutionary War (2003)

== Television ==
=== Portrayals ===
On television, George has been portrayed by:

- Albert Lieven in the British drama Rake's Progress (1939)
- Eric Pohlmann in the drama The Scarecrow of Romney Marsh (1963), part of the Disneyland series, based on the novel by Russell Thorndike
- Jean Muselli in the French children's drama Le matelot de nulle part, based on the novel Israel Potter by Herman Melville
- Graham Chapman in the BBC comedy series Monty Python's Flying Circus, in the episode "The Golden Age of Ballooning" (1974)
- John Tillinger in the American drama series The Adams Chronicles (1976)
- Nigel Davenport in the BBC drama series Prince Regent (1979)
- Rhys McConnochie in the ABC miniseries Captain James Cook (1987)
- Gertan Klauber in the final episode of the BBC comedy series Blackadder the Third (1987); George III was depicted as a complete madman with a German accent
- David Warner in the drama documentary The American Revolution (1994)
- Nicholas Rowe in the miniseries Longitude (2000)
- Mark Hadlow in the comedy/action series Jack of All Trades, in the episode "It's a Mad, Mad, Mad, Mad Opera" (2000)
- Charles Shaughnessy (voice) in the animated series Liberty's Kids (2002)
- Anthony Cochrane in the TV film Benjamin Franklin (2002)
- Geoffrey Streatfeild in the drama documentary Timewatch – How Mad Was King George? (2004)
- Yoshihisa Kawahara (Japanese – voice) / Blake McMahon (British – voice) in Le Chevalier D'Eon (2006–2007)
- Tom Hollander in the HBO miniseries John Adams (2008)
- Simon Farnaby, Lawry Lewin, Tom Stourton and Richard David-Caine in the British children's sketch show Horrible Histories (2009–2015)
- Paul Rhys in the AMC period drama series Turn: Washington's Spies (2015–2017)
- Edward Petherbridge in Jonathan Strange & Mr Norrell, a TV adaptation of the novel of the same name (2015)
- Paul Whitehouse in The Windsors (Christmas special, 2016); he, like many of Britain's past monarchs, appears as a ghost to give guidance to Prince William
- James Fleet in Bridgerton (2020) and Corey Mylchreest in the spinoff Queen Charlotte: A Bridgerton Story (2023)
- Jonathan Groff in the filmed stage recording Hamilton (2020)

=== Other ===
The popular 1970s U.S. children's educational series Schoolhouse Rock features a song entitled "No More Kings" which paints George III as a tyrant reluctant to allow the colonies out from under his boot.

George III's papers do not include a diary. The TV series The X-Files uses a fictional anecdote that George III's diary entry on July 4, 1776, read: "Nothing important happened today", as a plot device and as the title of the ninth-season premiere. (In fact, George could anyway not have been notified of transatlantic events until weeks later).

== Radio ==
George appeared in the final episode of the British radio comedy Revolting People in 2006, played by Timothy West, where he is almost convinced into calling off the American Revolutionary War.

== Sculpture ==
There are several extant statues of the king, not only in London (at the junction of Pall Mall and Cockspur Street, near Trafalgar Square, and in the courtyard of Somerset House titled George III and the River Thames) but also elsewhere – on London Street in Liverpool, on the Bargate in Southampton, at one end of the Long Walk in Windsor Great Park (The Copper Horse) and the painted King's Statue in Weymouth, Dorset.

The American statue of George III at Bowling Green, New York City was toppled on 9 July 1776 by Sons of Liberty during the American Revolution. A replica of the statue exists at the Museum of the American Revolution in Philadelphia.

Besides depictions in works of art, students for years learned the length of a mile through the mnemonic "George the Third said with a smile / 'There's seventeen sixty yards in a mile.'", 1760 being the year he came to the throne.
