= Power (Dear) =

Power is a play by the British playwright Nick Dear. It is set in the court of King Louis XIV of France. It deals with the intrigue and tension of the court and explores the events and ideas that led Louis XIV to take full control of government and become an absolute monarch.

The play is essentially a drama, but also contains a great deal of comedy and innuendo.

Power was first performed by the Royal National Theatre at the Cottesloe Theatre on July 3, 2003, and the original cast was:

- Jean-Baptiste Colbert – Stephen Boxer
- Anne of Austria – Barbara Jefford
- Nicolas Fouquet – Robert Lindsay
- Louise de la Valliere – Hattie Morahan
- Louis XIV – Rupert Penry-Jones
- Philippe I, Duke of Orléans – Jonathan Slinger
- Henriette d'Angleterre – Geraldine Somerville

More recently, Power was performed by the Putney Arts Theatre Company at Putney Arts Theatre in February 2006, and the Lace Market Theatre in Nottingham between 17 and 22 July 2006. Power was premiered in the Finnish National Theatre (Kansallisteatteri) 6 September 2006. It has also been produced at theatres in Portugal (Teatro Municipal de Almada), Poland and Hungary.

In May 2006 Power was staged at the Remy Bumppo Theatre Company in Chicago. In 2007 it was staged at Theatre Banshee in Burbank, California. In 2008 it was staged by Theatre in the Round Players in Minneapolis.
