= In the Ruins =

1984 radio play by Nick Dear

In the Ruins is a 1984 radio play by the British playwright Nick Dear, in which George III of the United Kingdom looks back on his life in 1817, the year before his death. It premiered on BBC Radio 3 in June 1984 and was adapted for the stage at the Bristol Old Vic in 1990, starring Patrick Malahide and directed by Paul Unwin.
