= Nick Dear =

British writer for stage, screen and radio (born 1955)

- Born: 11 June 1955 (age 71); Portsmouth, England
- Occupations: Playwright, screenwriter

Nick Dear (born 11 June 1955) is an English writer for stage, screen and radio. He received a BAFTA for his first screenwriting credit, a film adaptation of Jane Austen's Persuasion.

== Life and career ==
=== Early years and education ===
Dear graduated with a degree in Comparative European Literature from the University of Essex in 1977.

== Writing career ==
Dear's plays include Power and The Villains' Opera at the National Theatre; The Art of Success, Zenobia and Pure Science for the RSC; In the Ruins at Bristol Old Vic and Royal Court, London (1990); and Food of Love at the Almeida. Adaptations include Gorky's Summerfolk and Molière's Le Bourgeois gentilhomme at the National; Tirso de Molina's The Last Days of Don Juan at the Royal Shakespeare Company; Arbuzov's The Promise at the Tricycle; Henry James' The Turn of the Screw at Bristol Old Vic; and Ostrovsky's A Family Affair for Cheek by Jowl. Dear's screenplays include Persuasion, The Gambler, The Turn of the Screw, Cinderella, Byron, Eroica and Agatha Christie's Poirot. Opera libretti include The Palace in the Sky at Hackney Empire and Siren Song with music by Jonathan Dove at the Almeida.

In 2005, Lunch in Venice appeared at the Shell Connections festival at the National Theatre. His plays Power (2003), and Summerfolk (1999) both premiered at the same venue. Power deals with the intrigue and tension of the court of the young Louis XIV of France. It has been produced at theatres in Portugal, Poland and Hungary, as well as the Finnish National Theatre (Kansallisteatteri).

His play The Art of Success premiered at the Royal Shakespeare Company in 1986 in a production starring Penny Downie and Michael Kitchen, and was nominated for an Olivier Award. The plot revolves around William Hogarth and the political manipulation of art, the corruption of politics and treatment of women. It was subsequently produced at Manhattan Theatre Club in 1989, with Tim Curry playing Hogarth.

Dear's adaptation of Mary Shelley's Frankenstein premiered at the Royal National Theatre in 2011, in a production directed by Danny Boyle.

In November 2012 The Dark Earth and the Light Sky, his biographical play about Edward Thomas, opened at the Almeida Theatre, in a production directed by Richard Eyre.

== See also ==
- List of British playwrights since 1950
