= Laura Purcell =

British writer

- Occupation: Novelist
- Writing career
- Genres: Horror, historical fiction
- Notable works: Roanoke Falls; The Corset; The Silent Companions
- Website: laurapurcell.com

Laura Purcell is a British historical fiction and horror novelist and script writer.

She is the author of the horror novels The Silent Companions and The Shape of Darkness and served as lead writer on the historical horror podcast series Roanoke Falls which was executive produced by John Carpenter and Sandy King.

== Early life ==
Originally from Basildon, Purcell grew up in Billericay. She attended Chelmsford County High School for Girls.

== Bibliography ==
- The Queen of Bedlam (2014)
- Mistress of the Court (2015)
- The Silent Companions (2017)
- The Corset [published as The Poison Thread in the USA] (2018, 2019)
- Bone China [published as The House of Whispers in the USA] (2019)
- The Shape of Darkness (2021)
- The Whispering Muse (2023)
- Moonstone (2024)
- House of Splinters (2025)
