= Broad bottom government =

Coalition government in the Kingdom of Great Britain

In 18th-century British politics, the broad bottom government (or broad bottom administration) is a government with cross-party appeal, according (among others) to John Stuart Shaw, "The Political History of Eighteenth-century Scotland", 1999, when he describes the time of the Seven Years' War.

When William Pitt and the Duke of Newcastle joined the (Whig) government in 1757, the war increased consent along party lines and enabled a quick integration of the various Whig parties as well as a quickened integration of the Scots into a British nation.

Other examples of such governments are the Fox–North coalition of 1783 and the Ministry of All the Talents. The first ministry of Henry Pelham, 1744 to 1746, was called the "Broad Bottom ministry"

== See also ==
- United Kingdom coalition government (disambiguation)
