= Fort Charlotte =

Fort Charlotte may refer to:

== Events ==
- Battle of Fort Charlotte

== Places ==
=== Antigua and Barbuda ===
- Fort Charlotte, Antigua and Barbuda

=== Bahamas ===
- Fort Charlotte, Nassau

=== British Virgin Islands ===
- Fort Charlotte, Tortola

=== Canada ===
- Fort Charlotte (Halifax, Nova Scotia)

=== Saint Lucia ===
Fort Charlotte, Castries

=== Saint Vincent and the Grenadines ===
- Fort Charlotte, Saint Vincent

=== United Kingdom ===
- Fort Charlotte, Shetland

=== United States ===
- Fort Charlotte, Grand Portage
- Fort Charlotte, Mobile
- Fort Charlotte (South Carolina)
