= Charlotte of Mecklenburg-Strelitz =

Queen of Great Britain and Ireland from 1761 to 1818

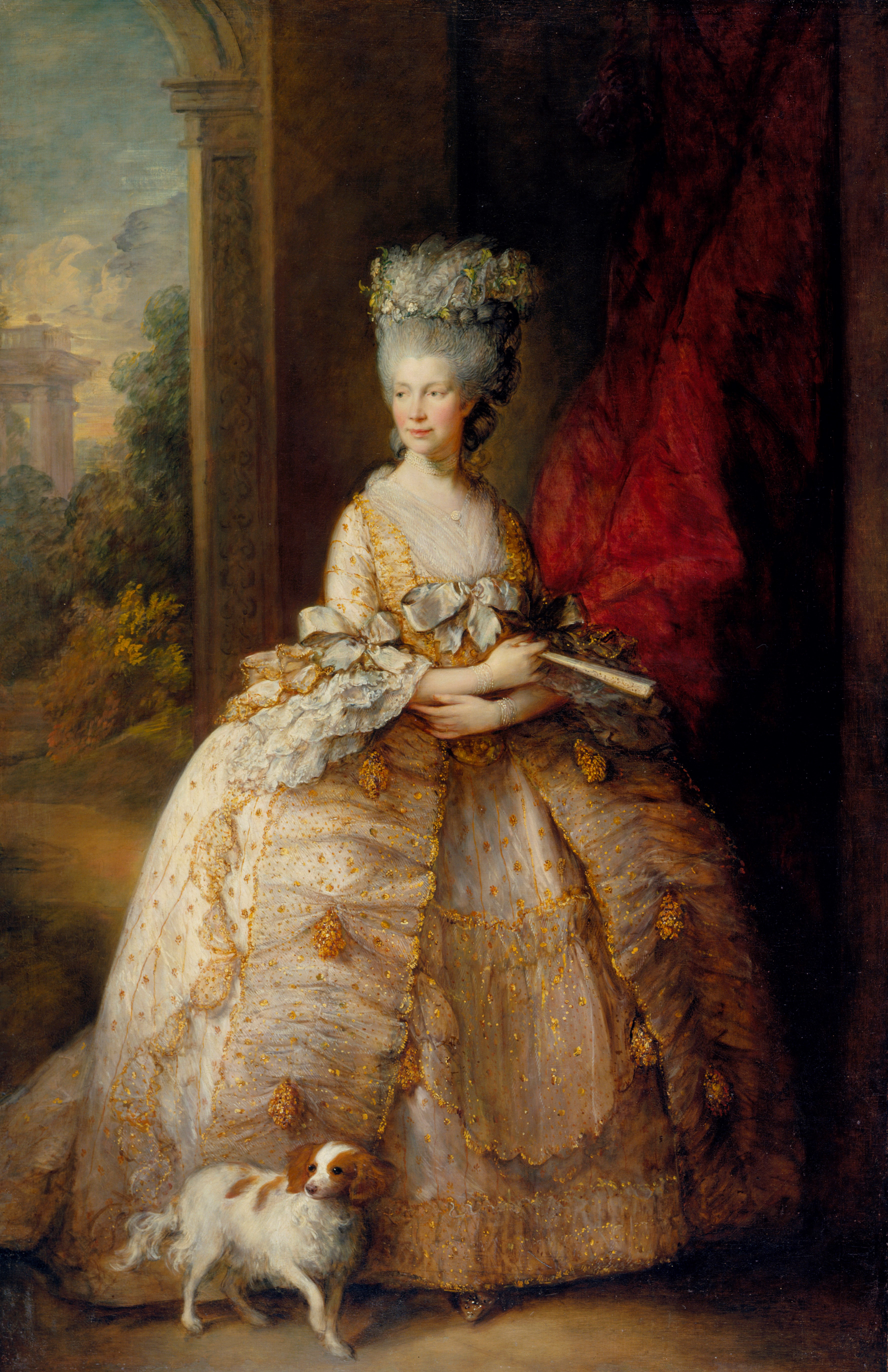
- Portrait of Queen Charlotte by Thomas Gainsborough, 1781

Queen consort of Great Britain and Ireland (Note: Queen consort of the United Kingdom from 1 January 1801, after the Acts of Union 1800); Electress/Queen consort of Hanover (Note: Queen consort from 12 October 1814)
- Tenure: 8 September 1761 – 17 November 1818
- Coronation: 22 September 1761
- Born: Princess Sophia Charlotte of Mecklenburg-Strelitz; 19 May 1744; Unteres Schloß, Mirow, Mecklenburg-Strelitz, Holy Roman Empire
- Died: 17 November 1818 (aged 74); Kew Palace, Kew, England
- Burial: 2 December 1818; Royal Vault, St George's Chapel, Windsor Castle
- Spouse: George III (m. 1761)
- Issue: George IV; Prince Frederick, Duke of York and Albany; William IV; Charlotte, Queen of Württemberg; Prince Edward, Duke of Kent and Strathearn; Princess Augusta Sophia; Elizabeth, Landgravine of Hesse-Homburg; Ernest Augustus, King of Hanover; Prince Augustus Frederick, Duke of Sussex; Prince Adolphus, Duke of Cambridge; Princess Mary, Duchess of Gloucester and Edinburgh; Princess Sophia; Prince Octavius; Prince Alfred; Princess Amelia
- House: Mecklenburg-Strelitz
- Father: Duke Charles Louis Frederick of Mecklenburg, Prince of Mirow
- Mother: Princess Elisabeth Albertine of Saxe-Hildburghausen

Charlotte of Mecklenburg-Strelitz (Sophia Charlotte; 19 May 1744 – 17 November 1818) was Queen of Great Britain and Ireland as the wife of King George III from their marriage on 8 September 1761 until her death in 1818. During her husband's reign, the Acts of Union 1800 merged Great Britain and Ireland into the United Kingdom. As George's wife, she was also electress of Hanover until becoming Queen of Hanover on 12 October 1814. Charlotte was Britain's longest-serving queen consort, serving for 57 years and 70 days.

Charlotte was born into the ruling family of Mecklenburg-Strelitz, a duchy in northern Germany. In 1760, the young and unmarried George III inherited the British throne. As Charlotte was a minor German princess with no interest in politics, the King considered her a suitable consort, and they married in 1761. Their 15 children, 13 of whom survived to adulthood, included two future British monarchs, George IV and William IV; as well as Charlotte, Princess Royal, who became Queen of Württemberg; and Prince Ernest Augustus, who became King of Hanover.

Charlotte was a patron of the arts and an amateur botanist who helped expand Kew Gardens. She introduced the Christmas tree to Britain, decorating one for a Christmas party for children of Windsor in 1800. She was distressed by her husband's bouts of physical and mental illness, which became permanent in later life. Charlotte was deeply shocked by the events of the French Revolution and of the ensuing Napoleonic Wars, which threatened the safety and sovereignty of her homeland. Her eldest son, George, was appointed prince regent in 1811 due to the increasing severity of the King's illness. Charlotte died at Kew Palace in November 1818, with several of her children at her side. George III died a little over a year later, probably unaware of his wife's death.

== Early life ==
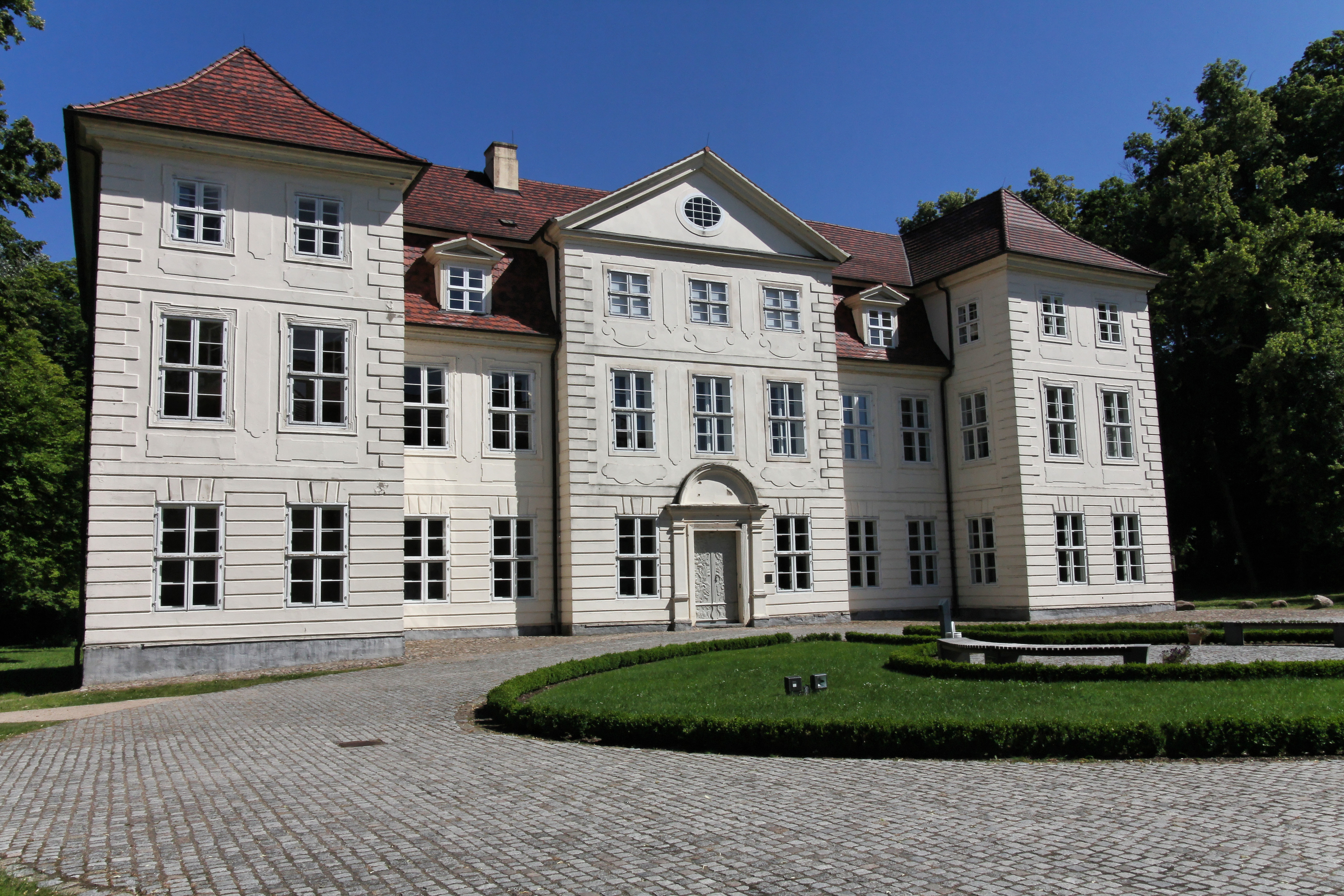
Charlotte's birthplace in Mirow

Charlotte was born on 19 May 1744. She was the youngest daughter of Duke Charles Louis Frederick of Mecklenburg, Prince of Mirow (1708–1752), and his wife Princess Elisabeth Albertine of Saxe-Hildburghausen (1713–1761). Mecklenburg-Strelitz was a small north-German duchy in the Holy Roman Empire.

The children of Duke Charles were all born at the Unteres Schloss (Lower Castle) in Mirow. According to diplomatic reports at the time of her engagement to George III in 1761, Charlotte had received "a very mediocre education" and contemporary Britons including Elizabeth Montagu expressed anxiety about the supposed provinciality of Charlotte's upbringing. Her parents hired notable individuals to tutor their children, among them Gottlob Burchard Genzmer and Friderike Elisabeth von Grabow. Charlotte received instruction in literature, botany, natural history, and languages including French, Italian, and Latin. She was also taught traditional pursuits for upper-class girls, including embroidery, dancing, singing, household management and religion – the latter taught by a priest. Charlotte was also taught to play the harpsichord by composer Johann Georg Linike. The family lived a modest life at Mirow; only after her brother Adolphus Frederick succeeded to the ducal throne, in 1752, did Charlotte gain any experience of princely duties and of court life.

== Marriage ==
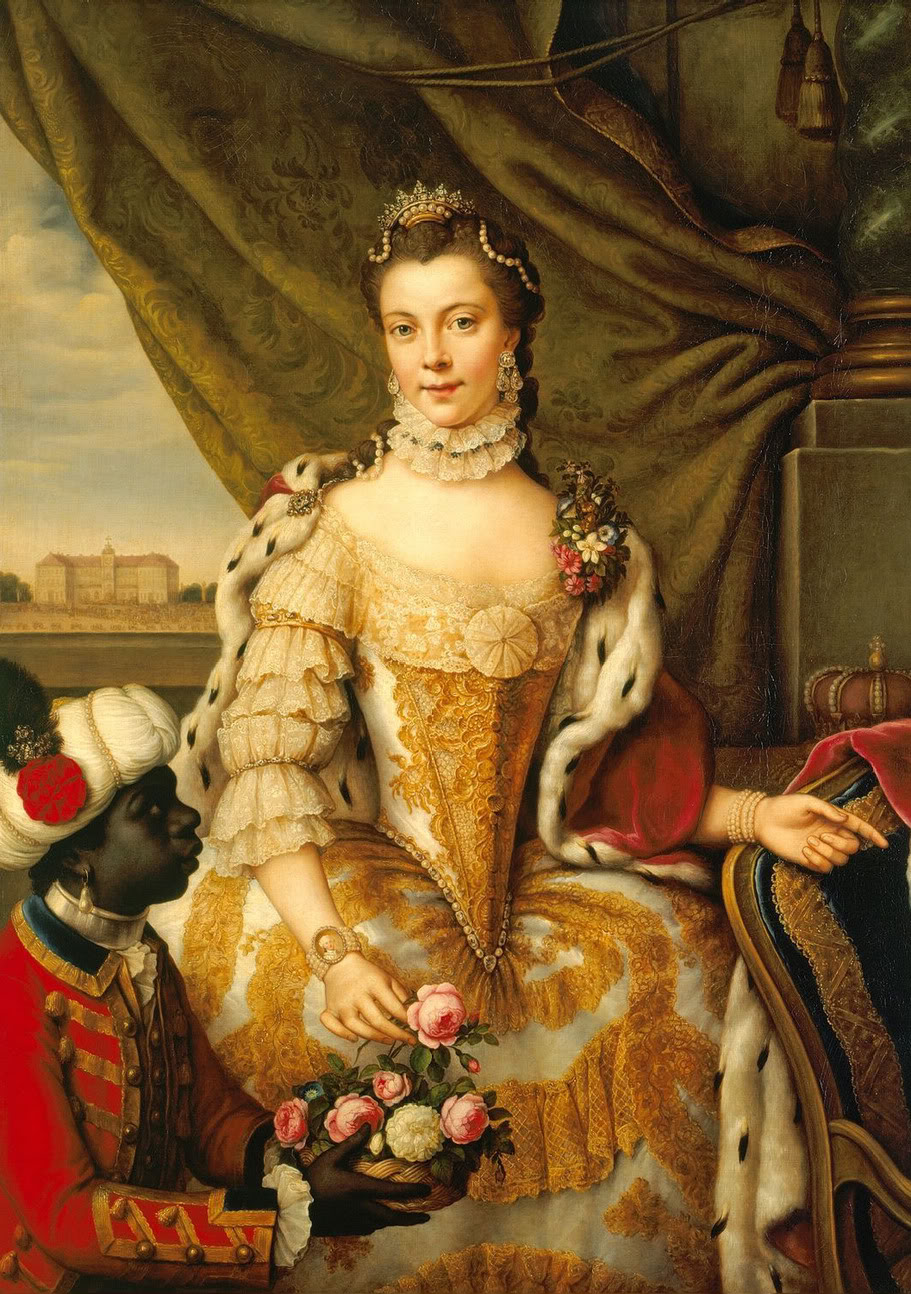
Charlotte with a servant by Johann Georg Ziesenis, c. 1761

When George III succeeded to the throne of Great Britain upon the 1760 death of his grandfather, George II, he was 22 years old and unmarried. His mother, Princess Augusta of Saxe-Gotha, and his advisors were eager to have him settled in marriage.

Charlotte was not originally considered as a potential bride, but the Hanoverian Minister in London, Baron Philip Adolphus von Münchausen, suggested her as a candidate, likely due to the positive relations between Hanover and Mecklenburg-Strelitz. The 17-year-old Charlotte appealed as a prospective consort partly because she had been brought up in an insignificant north German duchy and, therefore, would probably have had no experience or interest in power politics or party intrigues. That proved to be the case; to make sure, George III instructed her shortly after their wedding "not to meddle", a precept she dutifully followed.

The King announced to his Council in July 1761, according to the usual form, his intention to wed the Princess, after which a party of escorts, led by the Earl Harcourt, departed for Germany to bring Princess Charlotte to England. They reached Strelitz on 14 August 1761, and were received the next day by Duke Adolphus Frederick IV, Charlotte's brother, at which time the marriage contract was signed by him on the one hand and Lord Harcourt on the other. Charlotte's mother had died on 29 June, after giving encouragement to the betrothal following a correspondence with George III's mother, Princess Augusta.

Three days of public celebrations followed, and on 17 August 1761, Charlotte set out for Britain, accompanied by Adolphus Frederick and the British escort party, among them one of Charlotte's new Ladies of the Bedchamber, Elizabeth Hamilton, 1st Baroness Hamilton of Hameldon. On 22 August, they reached Cuxhaven, where a small fleet awaited to convey them to England. The voyage was extremely difficult; the party encountered three storms at sea and landed at Harwich only on 7 September. They set out at once for London, spent that night in Witham, at the residence of Lord Abercorn, and arrived at 3:30 pm the next day at St. James's Palace in London. They were received by the King and his family at the garden gate, which marked the first meeting of the bride and groom.

At 9:00 pm that same evening (8 September 1761), within six hours of her arrival, Charlotte was married to George III. The ceremony was performed at the Chapel Royal, St. James's Palace, by the archbishop of Canterbury, Thomas Secker. Only the royal family, the party who had travelled from Germany, and a handful of guests were present. George III and Charlotte's coronation was held at Westminster Abbey a fortnight later on 22 September, after a brief honeymoon at Richmond Lodge.

== Queen consort ==
Upon her wedding day, Charlotte spoke little English. However, she quickly learned the language, albeit speaking with a strong German accent. One observer commented, "She is timid at first but talks a lot, when she is among people she knows."

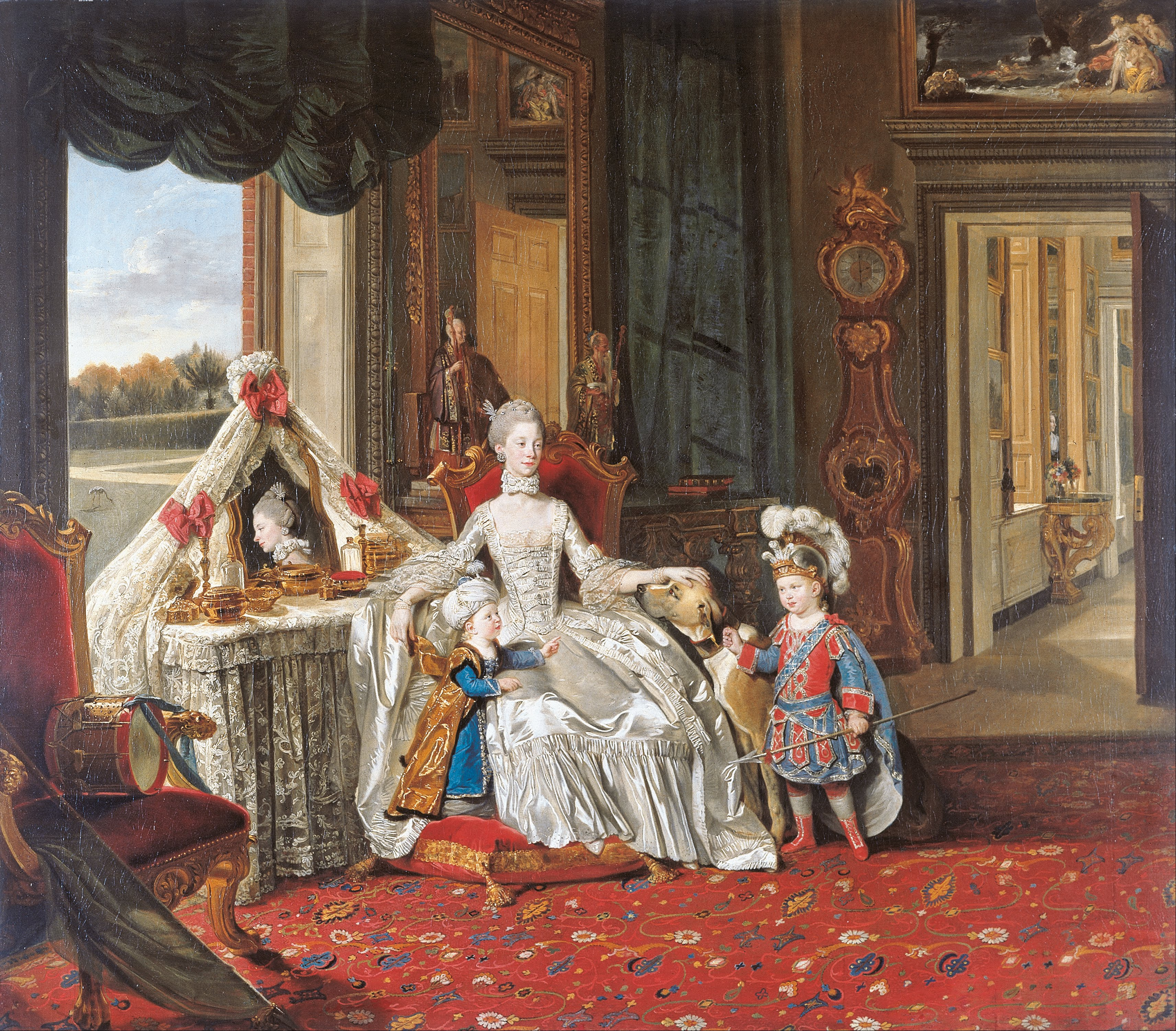
Queen Charlotte with her Two Eldest Sons, Johan Zoffany, 1765

Less than a year after the marriage, on 12 August 1762, the Queen gave birth to her first child, George, Prince of Wales. In the course of their marriage, the couple became the parents of 15 children, all but two of whom (Octavius and Alfred) survived into adulthood.

St James's Palace functioned as the official residence of the royal couple, but the King had recently purchased a nearby property, Buckingham House, located at the western end of St James's Park. More private and compact, the new property stood amid rolling parkland not far from St James's Palace. Around 1762, the King and Queen moved to this residence, which was originally intended as a private retreat. The Queen came to favour this residence, spending so much of her time there that it came to be known as The Queen's House. Indeed, in 1775, an Act of Parliament settled the property on Charlotte in exchange for her rights to Somerset House. Most of the couple's 15 children were born in Buckingham House, although St James's Palace remained the official and ceremonial royal residence. (Note: The tradition persists of foreign ambassadors being formally accredited to "the Court of St James's", even though they present their credentials and staff, upon their appointment, to the Monarch at Buckingham Palace.) (Note: The house which forms the architectural core of the present palace was built for the first Duke of Buckingham and Normanby in 1703 to the design of William Winde. Buckingham's descendant, Sir Charles Sheffield, sold Buckingham House to George III in 1761.)

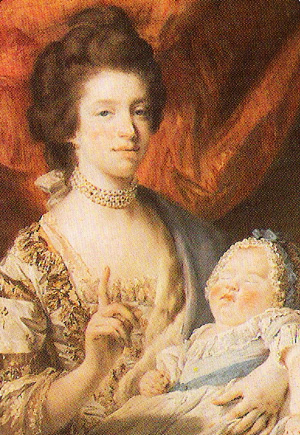
In 1767, Francis Cotes drew a pastel of Queen Charlotte with her eldest daughter, Charlotte, Princess Royal. Lady Mary Coke called the likeness "so like that it could not be mistaken for any other person".

During her first years in Great Britain, Charlotte's strained relationship with her mother-in-law, Augusta, caused her difficulty in adapting to the life of the British court. Augusta interfered with Charlotte's efforts to establish social contacts by insisting on rigid court etiquette. Furthermore, Augusta appointed many of Charlotte's staff, among whom several were expected to report to Augusta about Charlotte's behaviour. Charlotte turned to her German companions for friends, notably her close confidante Juliane von Schwellenberg. Charlotte's personal correspondence with her brother Charles II, Grand Duke of Mecklenburg-Strelitz, revealed the depth of her loneliness and of her frustration with the regulations of royal life.

The King enjoyed country pursuits and riding and preferred to keep his family's residence as much as possible in the then-rural towns of Kew and Richmond. He favoured an informal and relaxed domestic life, to the dismay of some courtiers more accustomed to displays of grandeur and strict protocol. Lady Mary Coke was indignant on hearing, in July 1769, that the King, the Queen, her visiting brother Prince Ernest and Lady Effingham had gone for a walk through Richmond by themselves without any servants: "I am not satisfied in my mind about the propriety of a Queen walking in town unattended."

From 1778, the royal family spent much of their time at a newly constructed residence, the Queen's Lodge at Windsor, opposite Windsor Castle, in Windsor Great Park, where the King enjoyed hunting deer. The Queen was responsible for the interior decoration of their new residence, described by a friend of the royal family and diarist Mary Delany: "The entrance into the first room was dazzling, all furnished with beautiful Indian paper, chairs covered with different embroideries of the liveliest colours, glasses, tables, sconces, in the best taste, the whole calculated to give the greatest cheerfulness to the place."

Charlotte treated her children's attendants with friendly warmth, which is reflected in this note she wrote to her daughters' assistant governess, Mary Hamilton:

My dear Miss Hamilton, What can I have to say? Not much indeed! But to wish you a good morning, in the pretty blue and white room where I had the pleasure to sit and read with you The Hermit, a poem which is such a favourite with me that I have read it twice this summer. Oh! What a blessing to keep good company! Very likely I should not have been acquainted with either poet or poem was it not for you.

Charlotte did have some influence on political affairs through the King. Her influence was discreet and indirect, as demonstrated in the correspondence with her brother Charles. She used her closeness with George III to keep herself informed and to make recommendations for offices. Apparently her recommendations were not direct; she on one occasion, in 1779, asked her brother Charles to burn her letter because the King suspected that a person she had recently recommended for a post was the client of a woman who sold offices. Charlotte particularly interested herself in German issues. She took an interest in the War of the Bavarian Succession (1778–1779), and it is possible that it was due to her efforts that the King supported British intervention in the continuing conflict between Joseph II and Charles Theodore of Bavaria in 1785.

== Husband's first period of illness ==
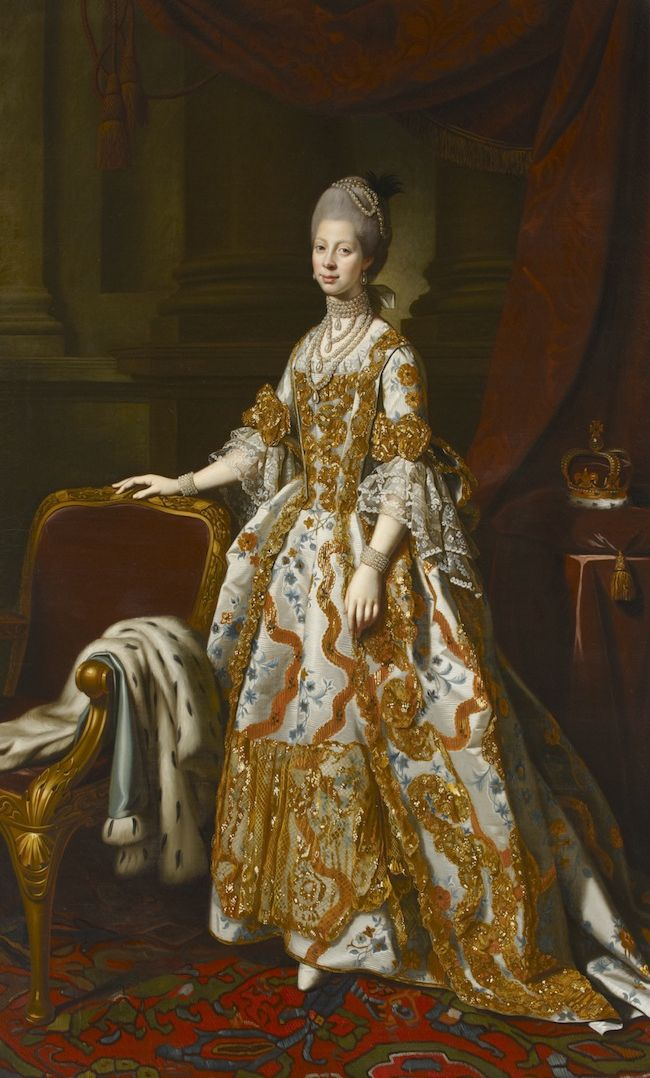
Portrait of Queen Charlotte by Nathaniel Dance-Holland, c. 1768

Some contemporaries, including Charlotte Papendiek, one of Charlotte's attendants, believed that George III first suffered from mental illness in 1765. However, the royal governess, Lady Charlotte Finch recorded that the king was merely ill with a fever; unlike Mrs Papendiek, who was absent in July 1765, Lady Charlotte was present in the royal household at the time. Mrs Papendiek claimed in her memoirs that Princess Augusta tried to keep Charlotte unaware of the situation in order to establish herself as regent. The Regency Bill of 1765 stated that if the King should become permanently unable to rule, Charlotte was to act as regent until the Prince of Wales came of age.

George III's bout of physical and mental illness started in October 1788 and lasted until March 1789. Charlotte was deeply distressed by the change in her husband's behaviour. The writer Frances Burney, at that time one of the Queen's attendants, overheard her moaning to herself with "desponding sound": "What will become of me? What will become of me?" When the King collapsed one night, she refused to be left alone with him and successfully insisted that she be given her own bedroom. When the doctor, Richard Warren, was called, she was not informed and was not given the opportunity to speak with him about it. When told by the Prince of Wales that the King was to be removed to Kew, but that she should move to Queen's House or to Windsor, she successfully insisted that she accompany her spouse to Kew, telling her son "Where the king is, there I shall be." However, she and her daughters were taken to Kew separately from the King and lived secluded from him during his illness. They regularly visited him, but the visits tended to be uncomfortable, as he had a tendency to embrace them and refuse to let them go.

During the 1788 illness of the King, a conflict arose between the Queen and the Prince of Wales, who suspected one another of desiring to assume the regency should the illness of the King become permanent, resulting in his being declared unfit to rule. Charlotte suspected her son of a plan to have the King declared insane with the assistance of Doctor Warren, and to take over the regency. Prince George's followers, notably Sir Gilbert Ellis, in turn suspected the Queen of a plan to have the King declared sane with the assistance of Doctor Francis Willis and Prime Minister William Pitt, so that he could have her appointed regent should he fall ill again, and then have him declared insane again and assume the regency once more. According to Doctor Warren, Doctor Willis had pressed him to declare the King sane on the orders of the Queen.

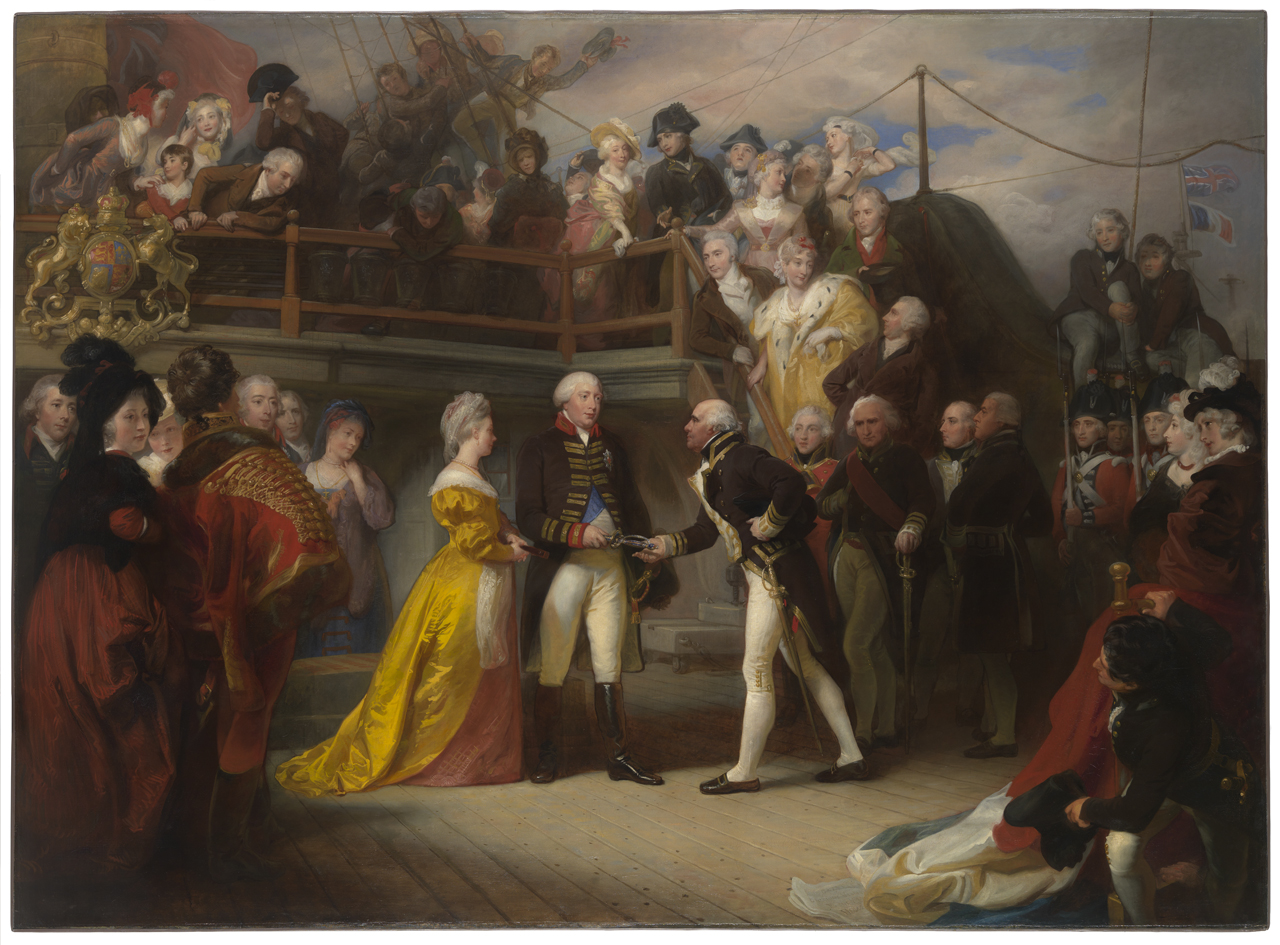
George and Charlotte visiting HMS Queen Charlotte on 26 June 1794

In the Regency Bill of 1789, the Prince of Wales was declared regent should the King become permanently insane, but it also placed the King himself, his court and minor children under the Queen's guardianship. The conflict around the regency led to serious discord between the Prince of Wales and his mother. In an argument he accused her of having sided with his enemies, while she called him the enemy of the King. Their conflict became public when she refused to invite him to the concert held in celebration of the recovery of the King, which created a scandal. During this period, Charlotte was caricatured in satirical prints that depicted her as an unnatural mother and a creature of the Prime Minister. In January 1789 The Times accused the Opposition of beginning "a most scurrilous attack on the queen, not only by private conversation, but through the medium of the prints in their interest". Charlotte and the Prince of Wales finally reconciled, on her initiative, in March 1791.

As a result of the king's illness in 1788–89 and of the public attacks on her character, the Queen's personality altered: she developed a terrible temper and no longer enjoyed appearing in public, not even at the musical concerts she had so loved; and her relationships with her adult children became strained. From 1792 she found some relief from her worry about her husband by planning the gardens and decoration of a new residence for herself, Frogmore House, in Windsor Home Park.

When the king's mental health declined again in 1804, it caused a serious rupture in the royal marriage. Despite the entreaties of her daughters and of the king's physicians, Charlotte slept in a separate bedroom, had her meals separate from the king, and avoided spending time alone with him.

== Interests and patronage ==
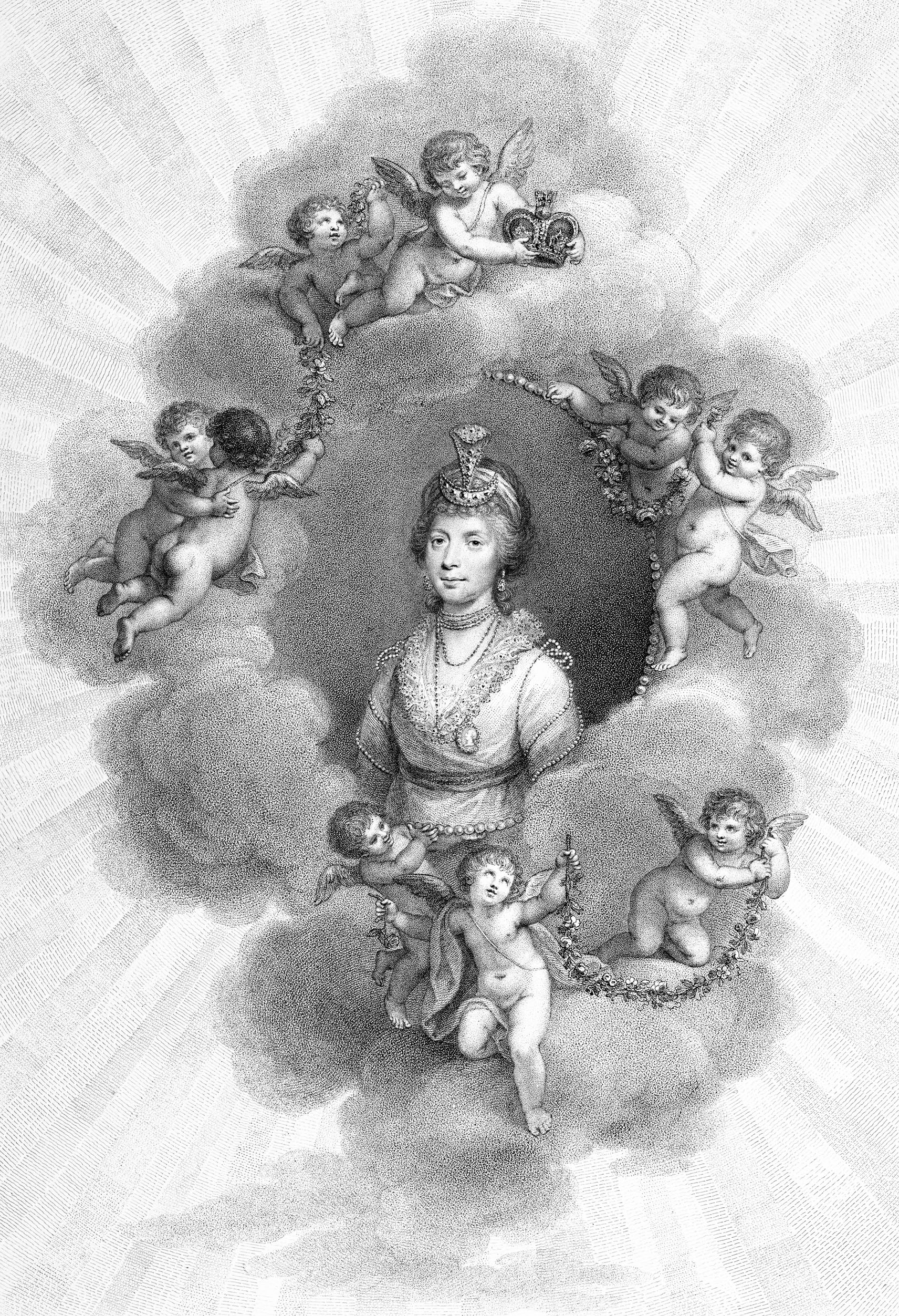
"Patroness of Botany, and of the Fine Arts"

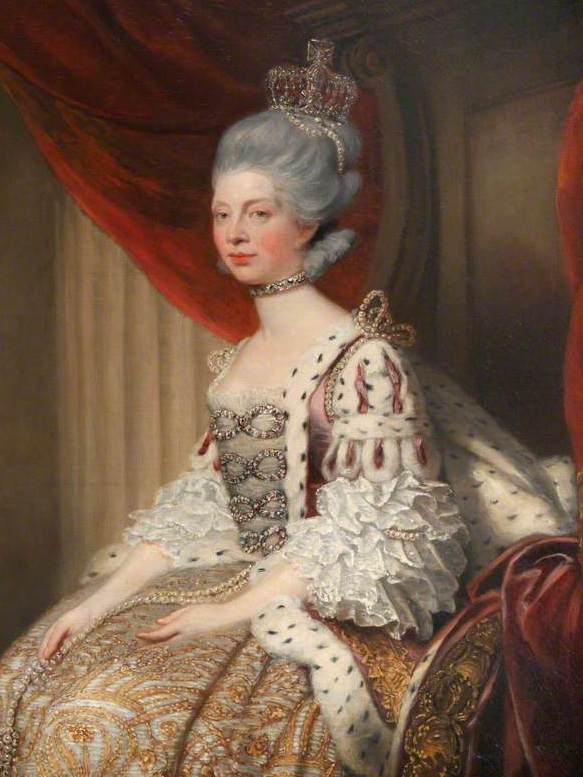
Queen Charlotte in Robes of State, by Joshua Reynolds, 1779

Charlotte and her husband were music connoisseurs, who gave special honour to German artists and composers. They were admirers of the music of George Frideric Handel.

In April 1764, Wolfgang Amadeus Mozart, then aged eight, arrived in Britain with his family as part of their grand tour of Europe and remained until July 1765. The Mozarts were summoned to court on 19 May and played before a limited circle from six to ten o'clock. Johann Christian Bach, eleventh son of the great Johann Sebastian Bach, was then music-master to the Queen. He put difficult works of Handel, J. S. Bach, and Carl Friedrich Abel before the boy: he played them all at sight, to the amazement of those present. Afterwards, the young Mozart accompanied the Queen in an aria that she sang, and played a solo work on the flute. On 29 October, the Mozarts were in London again, and were invited to court to celebrate the fourth anniversary of the King's accession. As a memento of the royal favour, Leopold Mozart published six sonatas composed by Wolfgang, known as Mozart's Opus 3, that were dedicated to the Queen on 18 January 1765, a dedication she rewarded with a present of 50 guineas.

Charlotte was an amateur botanist who took a great interest in Kew Gardens. In an age of discovery, when such travellers and explorers as Captain James Cook and Sir Joseph Banks were constantly bringing home new species and varieties of plants, she ensured that the collections were greatly enriched and expanded. Her interest in botany led to the South African flower, the bird of paradise, being named Strelitzia reginae in her honour.

Charlotte has also been credited with introducing the Christmas tree to Britain and its colonies. Initially, Charlotte decorated a single yew branch, a common Christmas tradition in her native Mecklenburg-Strelitz, to celebrate Christmas with members of the royal family and the royal household. She decorated the branch with the assistance of her ladies-in-waiting and then had the court gather to sing carols and distribute gifts. In December 1800, Queen Charlotte set up the first known English Christmas tree at Queen's Lodge, Windsor. That year, she held a large Christmas party for the children of all the families in Windsor and placed a whole tree in the drawing-room, decorated with tinsel, glass, baubles and fruits. John Watkins, who attended the Christmas party, described the tree in his biography of the Queen: "from the branches of which hung bunches of sweetmeats, almonds and raisins in papers, fruits and toys, most tastefully arranged; the whole illuminated by small wax candles. After the company had walked round and admired the tree, each child obtained a portion of the sweets it bore, together with a toy, and then all returned home quite delighted." The practice of decorating a tree became popular among the British nobility and gentry, and later spread to the colonies.

Among the royal couple's favoured craftsmen and artists were the cabinetmaker William Vile, silversmith Thomas Heming, the landscape designer Capability Brown, and the German painter Johann Zoffany, who frequently painted the King and Queen and their children in charmingly informal scenes, such as a portrait of Charlotte and her children as she sat at her dressing table. In 1788, the royal couple visited the Worcester Porcelain Factory (founded in 1751, and later to be known as Royal Worcester), where Queen Charlotte ordered a porcelain service that was later renamed "Royal Lily" in her honour. Another well-known porcelain service designed and named in her honour was the "Queen Charlotte" pattern.

The Queen founded orphanages and, in 1809, became the patron (providing new funding) of the General Lying-in Hospital, a hospital for expectant mothers. It was subsequently renamed as the Queen's Hospital, and is today the Queen Charlotte's and Chelsea Hospital.

Up until 1788, portraits of Charlotte often depict her in maternal poses with her children, and she looks young and contented; however, that year, her husband fell seriously ill and became temporarily insane. It is now thought that the King had porphyria, though bipolar disorder has also been named as another possible underlying cause for his condition. Sir Thomas Lawrence's portrait of Charlotte at this time marks a transition point, after which she looks much older in her portraits; the assistant keeper of Charlotte's wardrobe, Charlotte Papendiek, wrote that the Queen was "much changed, her hair quite grey".

== Friendship with Marie Antoinette ==
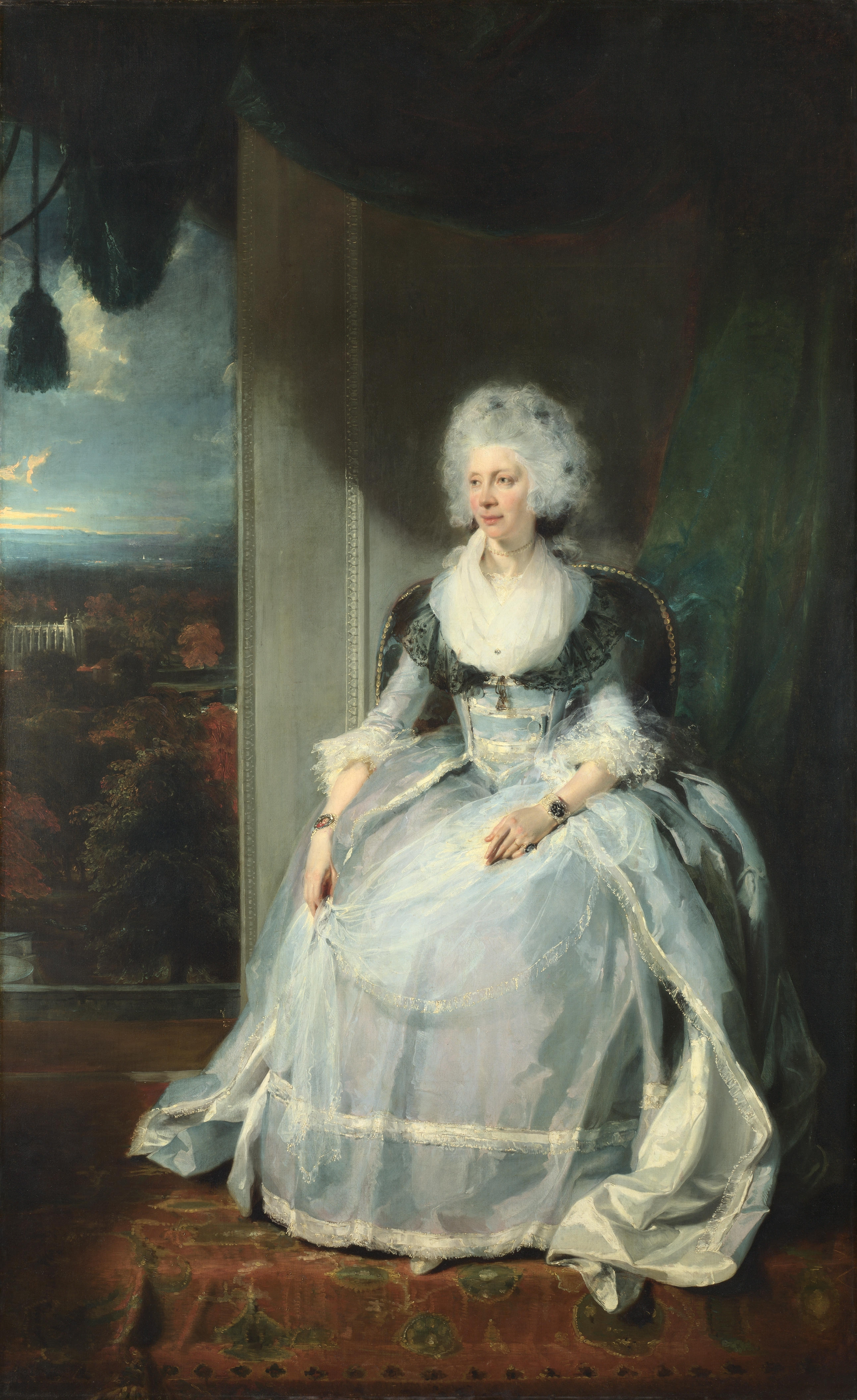
Charlotte sat for Sir Thomas Lawrence in September 1789. His portrait of her was exhibited at the Royal Academy the following year. Reviewers thought it "a strong likeness". (Note: The building in the distance is Eton College Chapel, as seen from Windsor Castle.)

The French Revolution of 1789 probably added to the strain that Charlotte felt. She had maintained a close relationship with Queen Marie Antoinette of France. Charlotte was 11 years older than Marie Antoinette, yet they shared many interests, such as their love of music and the arts, about which they were both enthusiastic. Never meeting face to face, they confined their friendship to pen and paper. Marie Antoinette confided in Charlotte upon the outbreak of the French Revolution. Charlotte had organized apartments to be prepared and ready for the refugee royal family of France to occupy. She was greatly distraught when she heard the news that the King and Queen of France had been executed.

== During the Regency ==
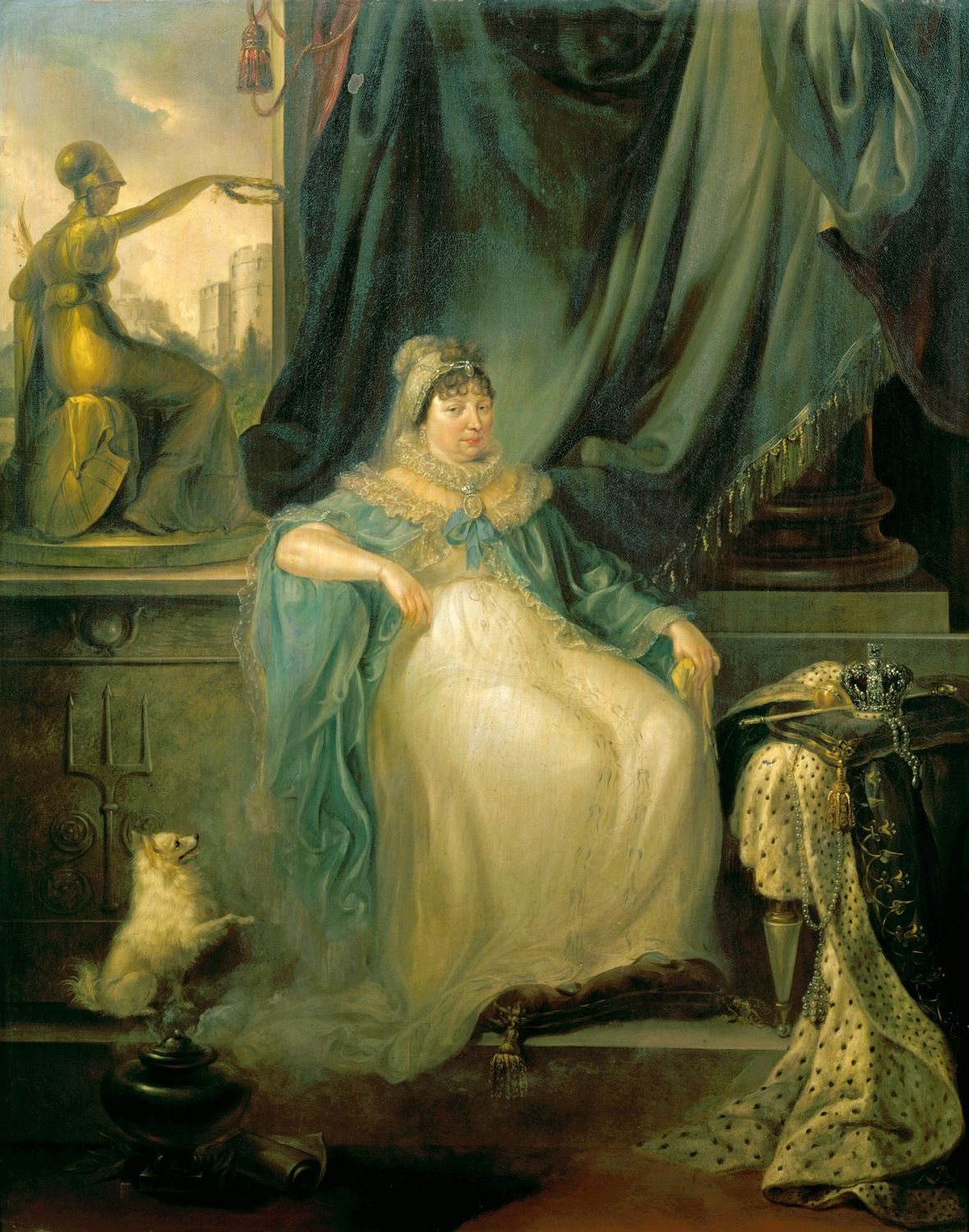
Queen Charlotte in her later years, painted by Stroehling, 1807, Royal Collection

After the onset of his permanent madness in 1811, George III was placed under the guardianship of his wife in accordance with the Regency Bill of 1789. She could not bring herself to visit him very often, due to his erratic behaviour and occasional violent reactions. It is believed she did not visit him again after June 1812. However, Charlotte remained supportive of her spouse as his illness worsened in old age. While her son, the Prince Regent, wielded the royal power, she was her spouse's legal guardian from 1811 until her death in 1818. Due to the extent of the King's illness, he was incapable of knowing or understanding that she had died.

During the Regency of her son, Charlotte continued to fill her role as first lady in royal representation because of the estrangement of the Prince Regent and his wife. As such, she functioned as the hostess by the side of her son at official receptions, such as the festivities given in London to celebrate the defeat of Emperor Napoleon in 1814. She also supervised the upbringing of her granddaughter, Princess Charlotte of Wales. During her last years, she was met with a growing lack of popularity and was sometimes subjected to demonstrations. After having attended a reception in London on 29 April 1817, she was jeered by a crowd. She told the crowd that it was upsetting to be treated like that after such long service.

== Death ==
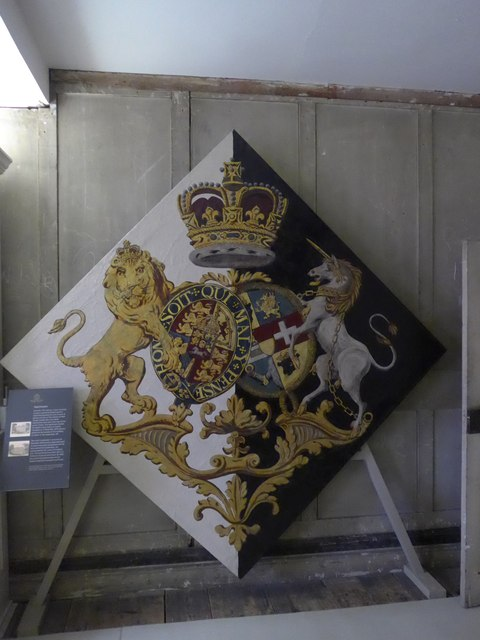
Queen Charlotte's funerary hatchment on display at Kew Palace. The right is black and the left white because she was survived by her husband, King George III.

Charlotte died on 17 November 1818 at the age of 74 while seated in an armchair at Dutch House in Surrey, now known as Kew Palace. Her eldest son, the Prince Regent, was present, holding her hand. She was buried in the Royal Vault at St George's Chapel, Windsor Castle on 2 December. Her husband died just over a year later. She is the longest-serving female consort and second-longest-serving consort in British history (after Prince Philip, Duke of Edinburgh), having served as such from her marriage (on 8 September 1761) to her death (17 November 1818), a total of 57 years and 70 days.

On the day before her death, the Queen dictated her will to her husband's secretary, Sir Herbert Taylor, appointing him and Lord Arden as her executors; at her death, her personal estate was valued at less than £140,000 (equivalent to £13,000,000 in 2024), with her jewels accounting for the greater portion of her assets. In her will, proven at Doctor's Commons on 8 January 1819, the Queen bequeathed her husband the jewels she had received from him, unless he remained in his state of insanity, in which case the jewels were to become an heirloom of the House of Hanover. Other jewels, including some given to Charlotte by the Nawab of Arcot, were to be evenly distributed among her surviving daughters. The furnishings and fixtures at the royal residence at Frogmore, along with "live and dead stock...on the estates", were bequeathed to her daughter Augusta Sophia along with the Frogmore property, unless its maintenance would prove too expensive for her daughter, in which case it was to revert to the Crown. Her daughter Sophia inherited the Royal Lodge. Certain personal assets that the Queen had brought from Mecklenburg-Strelitz were to revert to the senior branch of that dynasty, while the remainder of her assets, including her books, linen, art objects and china, were to be evenly divided among her surviving daughters.

At the Queen's death, the Prince Regent claimed Charlotte's jewels, and on his death, they were in turn claimed by his heir, William IV. On William's death, Charlotte's bequest then sparked a protracted dispute between her granddaughter Queen Victoria, who claimed the jewels as the property of the British Crown, and Charlotte's now eldest-surviving son Ernest Augustus, King of Hanover, who claimed the jewels by right of being the most senior male member of the House of Hanover. The dispute would not be resolved in Ernest's lifetime. Eventually in 1858, over twenty years after the death of William IV and nearly forty years after Charlotte's death, the matter was decided in favour of Ernest's son George, upon which Victoria had the jewels given into the custody of the Hanoverian ambassador.

The rest of Charlotte's property was sold at auction from May to August 1819. Her clothes, furniture, and even her snuff were sold by Christie's. It is highly unlikely that her husband ever knew of her death; he died blind, deaf, lame and insane 14 months later.

== Legacy ==
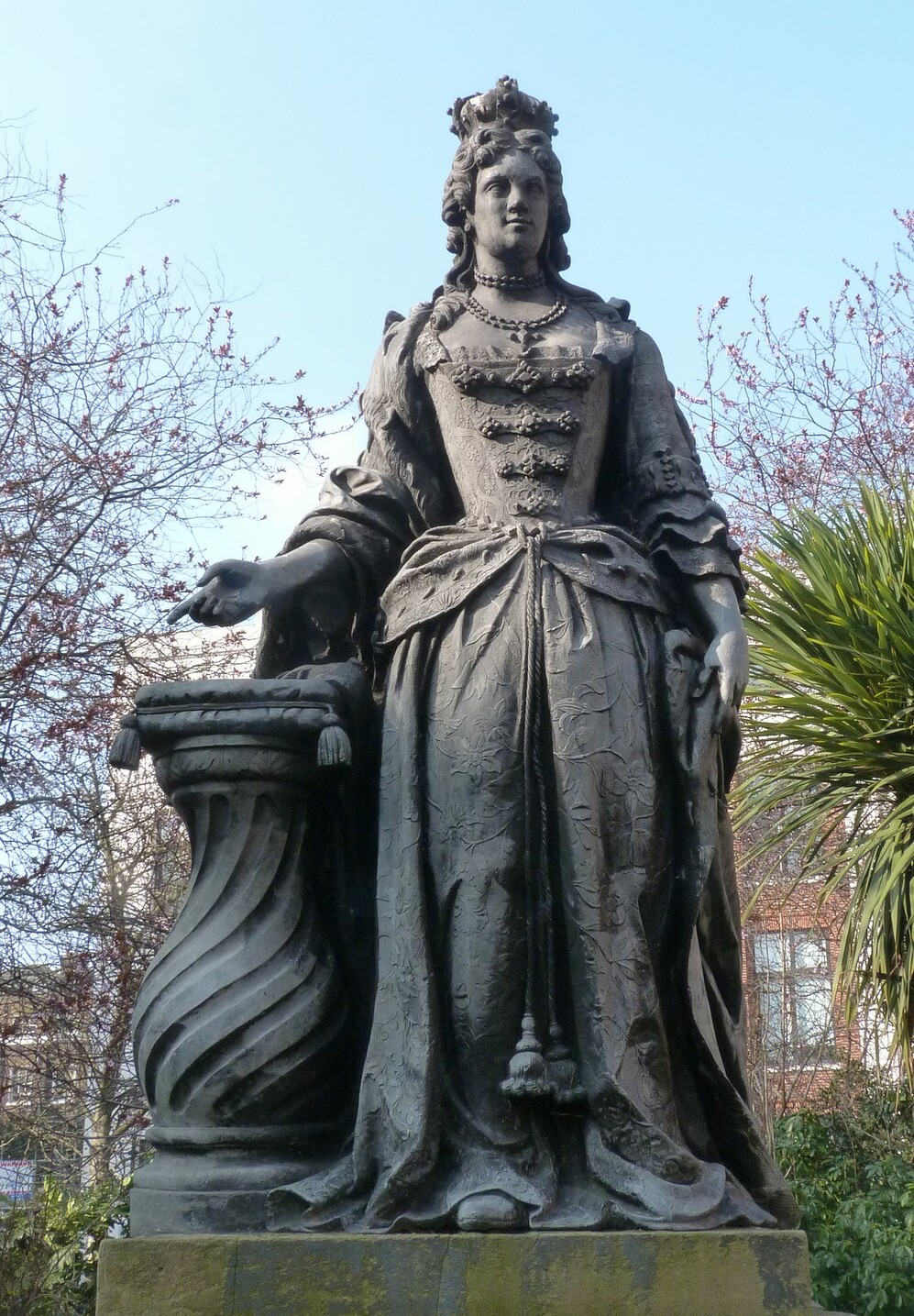
Statue in Queen Square, London

Places named after Charlotte include the Queen Charlotte Islands (now known as Haida Gwaii) in British Columbia, Canada, and Queen Charlotte City (now known as Daajing Giids) on Haida Gwaii; Queen Charlotte Sound in British Columbia; Queen Charlotte Channel (near Vancouver, Canada); Queen Charlotte Bay in West Falkland; Queen Charlotte Sound, South Island, New Zealand; several fortifications, including Fort Charlotte, Saint Vincent; Charlottesville, Virginia; Charlottetown, Prince Edward Island; Charlotte, North Carolina; Mecklenburg County, North Carolina; Mecklenburg County, Virginia; Charlotte County, Virginia; Charlotte County, Florida; Port Charlotte, Florida; Charlotte Harbor, Florida; and Charlotte, Vermont. The proposed North American colonies of Vandalia and Charlotina were also named for her. In Tonga, the royal family adopted the name Sālote (the Tongan version of Charlotte) in her honour, and notable individuals included Sālote Lupepauʻu and Sālote Tupou III.

Charlotte's provision of funding to the General Lying-in Hospital in London prevented its closure; today it is named Queen Charlotte's and Chelsea Hospital, and is an acknowledged centre of excellence amongst maternity hospitals. A large copy of the Allan Ramsay portrait of Queen Charlotte hangs in the main lobby of the hospital. The Queen Charlotte's Ball, an annual debutante ball that originally funded the hospital, is named after her.

A lead statue probably of Charlotte, dating to c. 1775, stands on Queen Square in Bloomsbury, London, and there are two statues of her in Charlotte, North Carolina: at Charlotte Douglas International Airport and at the International Trade Center.

Rutgers, The State University of New Jersey, was chartered in 1766 as Queen's College, in reference to Queen Charlotte. It was renamed in 1825 in honour of Henry Rutgers, a Revolutionary War officer and college benefactor. Its oldest extant building, Old Queen's (built 1809–1823), and the city block that forms the historic core of the university, Queen's Campus, retain their original names.

Queen Charlotte was played by Frances White in the 1979 television series Prince Regent, by Helen Mirren in the 1994 film The Madness of King George, by Heike Makatsch in the 2000 television miniseries Longitude, by Golda Rosheuvel in the 2020 Netflix original series Bridgerton, and by India Amarteifio in her younger years and Rosheuvel, in her older years, in Queen Charlotte: A Bridgerton Story.

Strelitzia, a genus of flowering plants native to South Africa that has become ubiquitous in warm-weather regions worldwide, is named for Charlotte's native Mecklenburg-Strelitz.

== Arms ==
The royal coat of arms of the United Kingdom are impaled with her father's arms as a Duke of Mecklenburg-Strelitz. The arms were: Quarterly of six, 1st, Or, a buffalo's head cabossed Sable, armed and ringed Argent, crowned and langued Gules (Mecklenburg); 2nd, Azure, a griffin segreant Or (Rostock); 3rd, Per fess, in chief Azure, a griffin segreant Or, and in the base Vert, a bordure Argent (Principality of Schwerin); 4th, Gules, a cross patée Argent crowned Or (Ratzeburg); 5th, Gules, a dexter arm Argent issuant from clouds in sinister flank and holding a finger ring Or (County of Schwerin); 6th, Or, a buffalo's head Sable, armed Argent, crowned and langued Gules (Wenden); Overall an inescutcheon, per fess Gules and Or (Stargard).

The Queen's arms changed twice to mirror the changes in her husband's arms, once in 1801 and then again in 1816. A funerary hatchment displaying the Queen's full coat of arms, painted in 1818, is on display at Kew Palace.

Arms of Queen Charlotte, from 1761 to 1801

Arms of Queen Charlotte, from 1801 to 1816

Arms of Queen Charlotte, from 1816 to 1818

== Issue ==
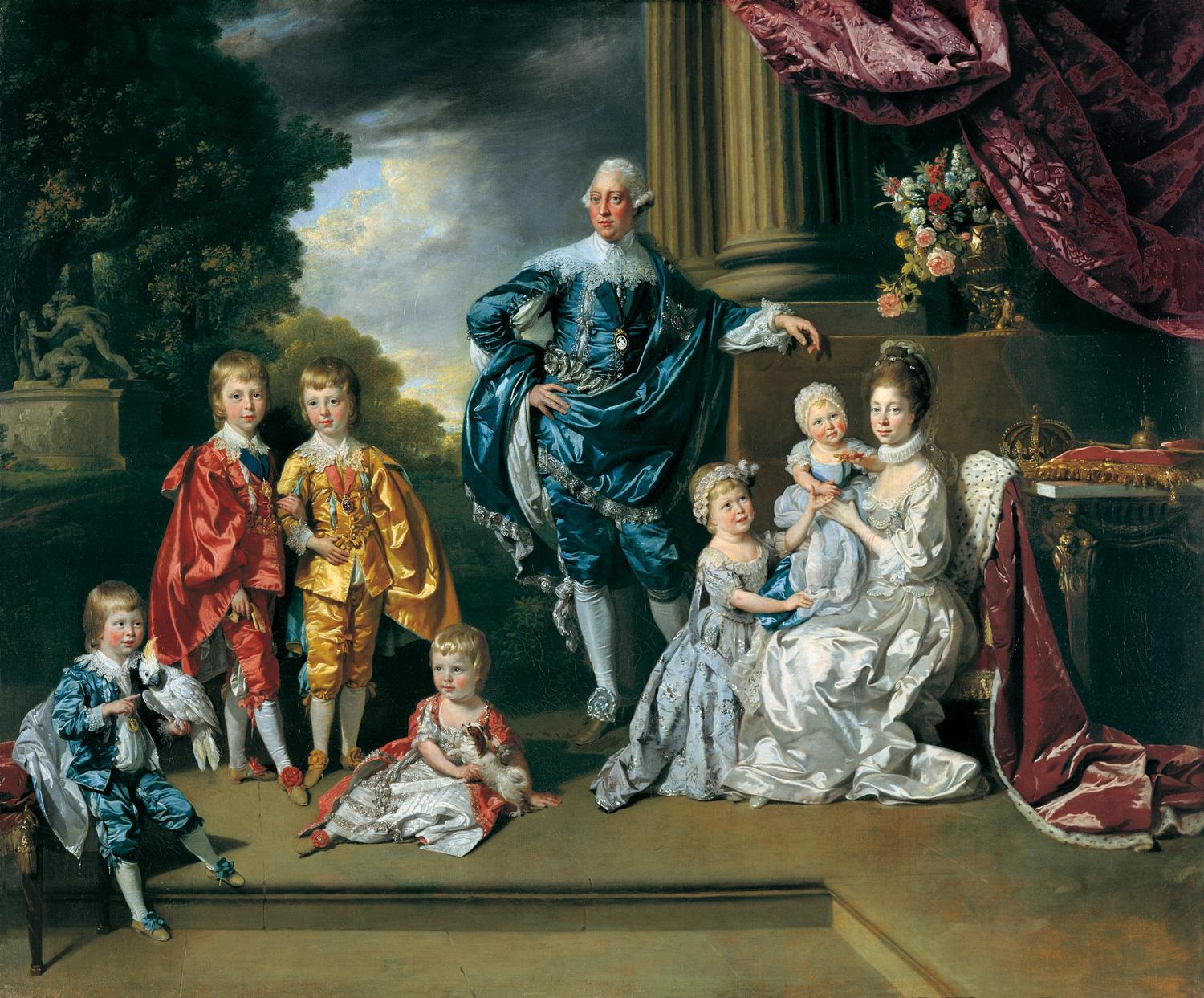
King George III and Queen Charlotte with their six eldest children, by Johan Zoffany, 1770

Name	Birth	Death	Notes
George IV	12 August 1762	26 June 1830	(1) married 1785 Mrs. Maria Fitzherbert, marriage legally invalid as George III had not consented to the match. (2) 1795, Princess Caroline of Brunswick-Wolfenbüttel; had issue (Princess Charlotte of Wales); no surviving descendants today
Prince Frederick, Duke of York and Albany	16 August 1763	5 January 1827	married 1791, Princess Frederica of Prussia; no issue
William IV	21 August 1765	20 June 1837	married 1818, Princess Adelaide of Saxe-Meiningen; no surviving legitimate issue, but had illegitimate issue
Charlotte, Princess Royal	29 September 1766	6 October 1828	married 1797, King Frederick of Württemberg; no surviving issue
Prince Edward, Duke of Kent and Strathearn	2 November 1767	23 January 1820	married 1818, Princess Victoria of Saxe-Coburg-Saalfeld; had issue (Queen Victoria)
Princess Augusta Sophia	8 November 1768	22 September 1840	never married, no issue
Princess Elizabeth	22 May 1770	10 January 1840	married 1818, Frederick VI, Landgrave of Hesse-Homburg; no issue
Ernest Augustus, King of Hanover	5 June 1771	18 November 1851	married 1815, Princess Friederike of Mecklenburg-Strelitz; had issue (King George V of Hanover)
Prince Augustus Frederick, Duke of Sussex	27 January 1773	21 April 1843	(1) married in contravention of the Royal Marriages Act 1772, Lady Augusta Murray; had issue; marriage annulled 1794 (2) married 1831, Lady Cecilia Buggin (later 1st Duchess of Inverness); no issue
Prince Adolphus, Duke of Cambridge	24 February 1774	8 July 1850	married 1818, Princess Augusta of Hesse-Kassel; had issue
Princess Mary	25 April 1776	30 April 1857	married 1816, Prince William Frederick, Duke of Gloucester and Edinburgh; no issue
Princess Sophia	3 November 1777	27 May 1848	never married, no issue
Prince Octavius	23 February 1779	3 May 1783	died in childhood, of smallpox
Prince Alfred	22 September 1780	20 August 1782	died in childhood, of smallpox
Princess Amelia	7 August 1783	2 November 1810	never married, no issue

== African ancestry claim ==
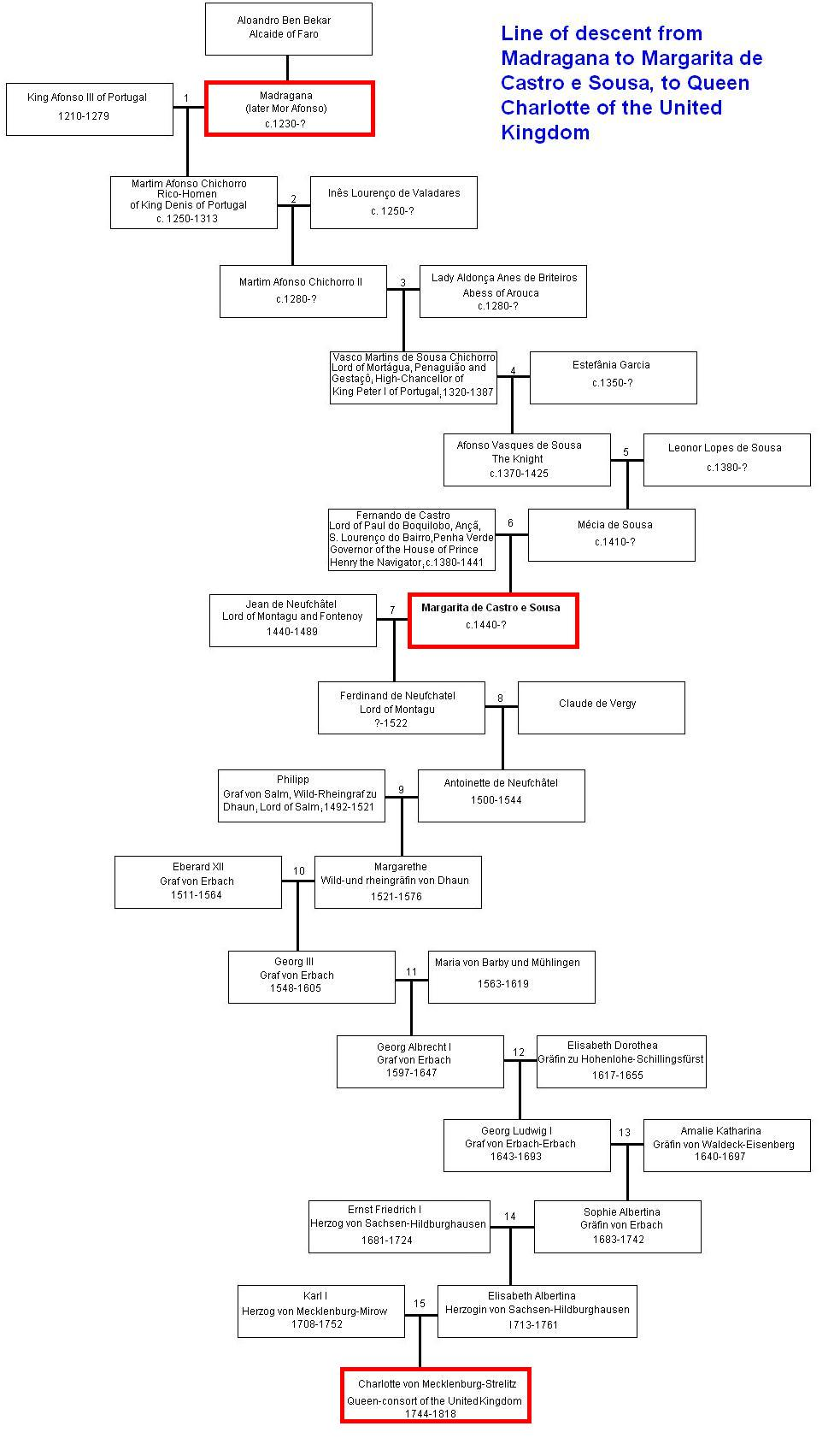
One of three lines of descent between Charlotte, Margarita de Castro e Sousa, and Madragana. This portion of Charlotte's ancestry has often been used to justify claims that she was of African descent.

Claims that Queen Charlotte may have had partial African ancestry first emerged in Racial Mixture as the Basic Principle of Life published in 1929 by German historian, Brunold Springer, who challenged her Thomas Gainsborough portrait as inaccurate.

Based on her alternative portrait by Allan Ramsay and contemporary descriptions of her appearance, Springer concluded that Charlotte's "broad nostrils and heavy lips" must point to African heritage. Jamaican-American amateur historian J. A. Rogers agreed with Springer in his 1940 book Sex and Race: Volume I, where he concluded that Queen Charlotte must be "biracial" or "black".

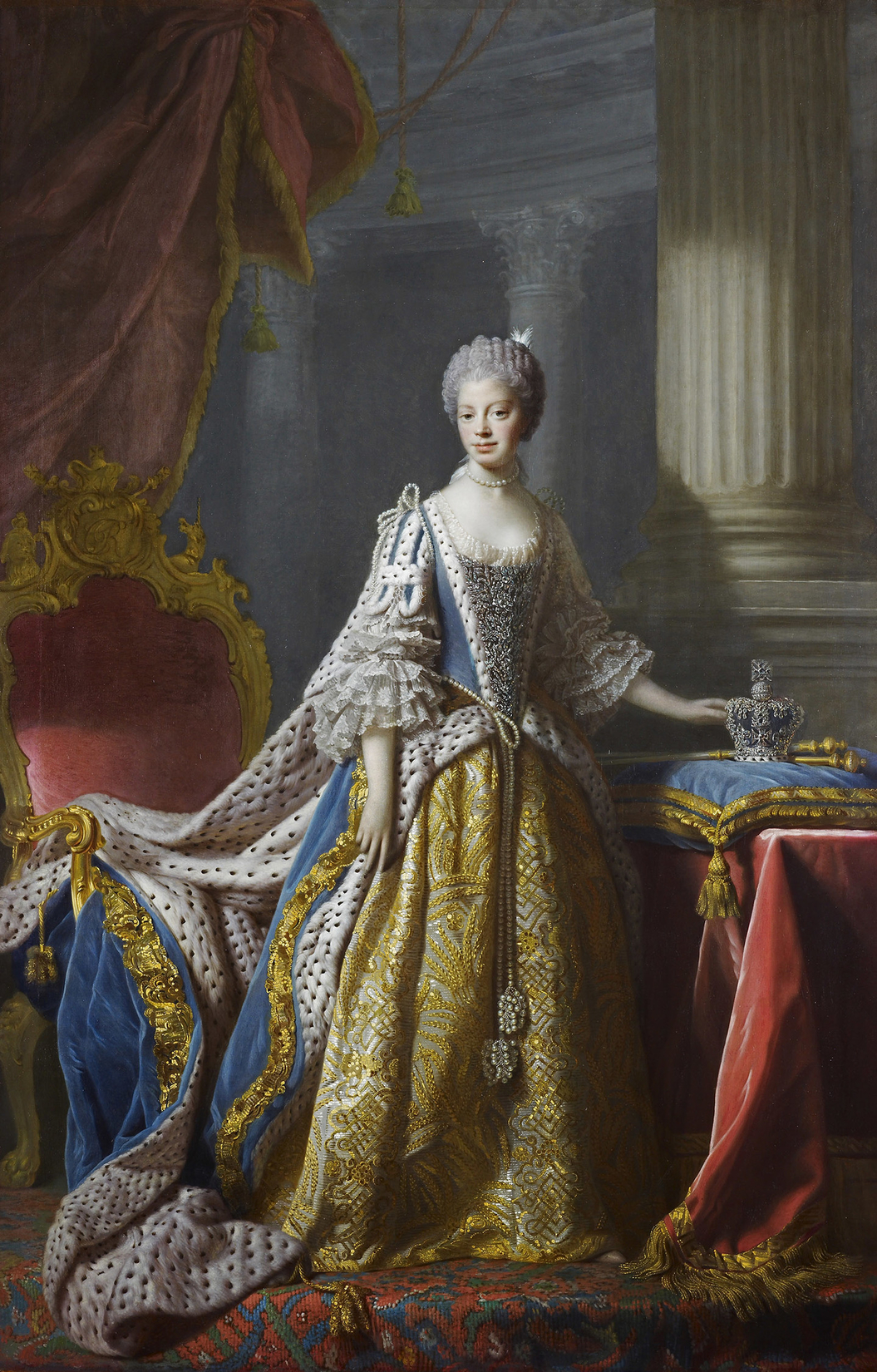
Queen Charlotte by Allan Ramsay, 1762

Proponents of the African ancestry claim also hold to a literal interpretation of Baron Stockmar's diary, in which he described Charlotte as "small and crooked, with a real Mulatto face". Stockmar, who served as personal physician to the Queen's grandson-in-law, Leopold I of Belgium, arrived at court in 1816, just two years before Charlotte's death. His descriptions of Charlotte's children in this same diary are equally unflattering.

In 1997, Mario de Valdes y Cocom, a genealogist and self-described "independent researcher", popularized and expanded on earlier arguments in an article for PBS Frontline, which has since been cited as the main source by a number of articles on the topic. Valdes also seized on Charlotte's 1762 Allan Ramsay portrait as evidence of African ancestry, citing the Queen's "unmistakable African appearance" and "negroid physiogomy" [sic].

Valdes claimed that Charlotte had inherited these features from one of her distant ancestors, Madragana (born c. 1230), a mistress of King Afonso III of Portugal (c. 1210 – 1279). His conclusion is based on various historical sources that describe Madragana as either Moorish or Mozarab, which Valdes erroneously interpreted to mean that she was black.

Although popular among the general public, the claims are rejected by most scholars. Aside from Stockmar's jab at her appearance shortly before her death, Charlotte was never referred to as having any specifically African physical features, let alone ancestry, during her lifetime. Furthermore, her portraiture was not atypical for her time, and painted portraits in general should not be considered reliable evidence of a sitter's true appearance. Historian Andrew Roberts describes the claims as "utter rubbish", and attributes its public popularity to a hesitancy among historians to openly address it due to its "cultural cringe factor".

The use of the term "Moor" as a racial identifier for Charlotte's ancestor Madragana is also inconclusive as during the Middle Ages the term was not used to describe race but religious affiliation. Regardless, Madragana was more likely an Iberian Mozarab, and any genetic contribution from an ancestor fifteen generations removed would be so diluted as to have a negligible effect on her appearance.

All eight of Charlotte's great-grandparents were white German aristocrats.

8. Adolphus Frederick I, Duke of Mecklenburg-Schwerin
4. Adolphus Frederick II, Duke of Mecklenburg-Strelitz
9. Duchess Marie Katharina of Brunswick-Dannenberg
2. Duke Charles Louis Frederick of Mecklenburg-Strelitz
10. Christian William I, Prince of Schwarzburg-Sondershausen
5. Princess Christiane Emilie of Schwarzburg-Sondershausen
11. Countess Antonie Sibylle of Barby-Mühlingen
1. Princess Charlotte of Mecklenburg-Strelitz
12. Ernest, Duke of Saxe-Hildburghausen
6. Ernest Frederick I, Duke of Saxe-Hildburghausen
13. Countess Sophie Henriette of Waldeck
3. Princess Elisabeth Albertine of Saxe-Hildburghausen
14. George Louis I, Count of Erbach-Erbach
7. Countess Sophia Albertine of Erbach-Erbach
15. Countess Amalia Katharina of Waldeck

In 2017, following the announcement of the engagement of Prince Harry and Meghan Markle, a number of news articles were published promoting the claims.

David Buck, a Buckingham Palace spokesperson, was quoted by the Boston Globe as saying: "This has been rumoured for years and years. It is a matter of history, and frankly, we've got far more important things to talk about."

== Notes ==
Charlotte of Mecklenburg-Strelitz House of Mecklenburg-Strelitz Cadet branch of the House of Mecklenburg Born: 19 May 1744 Died: 17 November 1818
British royalty
Vacant Title last held by Caroline of Ansbach	Queen consort of Great Britain and Ireland; 1761–1800	Acts of Union 1800
Vacant Title last held by Caroline of Ansbach	Electress consort of Hanover; 1761–1814	Title abandoned Holy Roman Empire dissolved in 1806
New title	Queen consort of the United Kingdom; 1801–1818	Vacant Title next held by Caroline of Brunswick
New title	Queen consort of Hanover; 1814–1818	Vacant Title next held by Caroline of Brunswick
