= Fort Charlotte, Saint Vincent =

Fort Charlotte
- Part of Kingstown, Saint Vincent
- Edinboro road, Saint Andrew
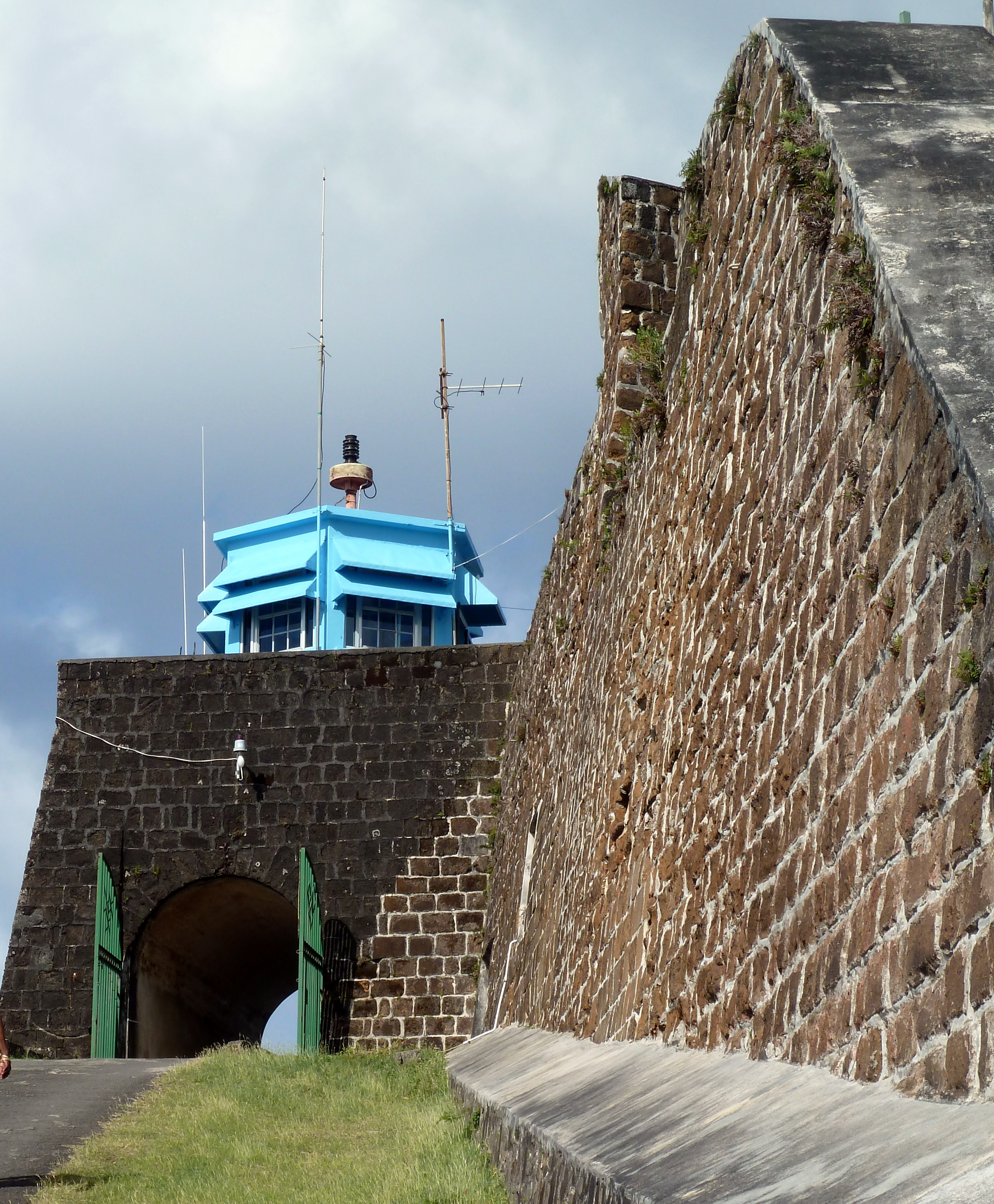
- Entrance to Fort Charlotte

Site information
- Open to the public: Yes

Location
- Coordinates: 13.1579°N 61.2421°W

Site history
- Built: 1763 and completed by 1806

Fort Charlotte is a British-colonial era fort, built on a hill overlooking the harbour of Kingstown, Saint Vincent. It is located in the parish of Saint Andrew, Saint Vincent and the Grenadines at the top of Edinboro road, on Berkshire Hill, just west of the town.

Standing at 601 feet above the sea level, it is the major early 19th-century fortification in Saint Vincent. The fort enjoys a panoramic view of the Leeward side of the island, including Kingstown, Young Island, the Caribbean, Bequia and the Grenadines. On a clear day, Grenada, 90 miles to the south, can be seen.

== Origins ==
On re-taking the island in 1763 from the French, the British commenced the building of the fort which was completed by 1806. It was capable of supporting 600 troops and 34 guns and some cannons are dated 1811.

It was built to protect against French attack, Carib unrest, and slave rebellion. The British garrison were to use it for holding out against any French invading forces while the Royal Navy brought reinforcements from other islands. The British were taught a lesson when the French invaded the island at Calliaqua in 1779 thus proving that any likely attack on the island would come from any location, rather than directly on Kingstown itself or from the sea. Consequently, the fort was built as a redoubt accessed by a viaduct; with its cannon pointing inland.

The fort was named after Charlotte of Mecklenburg-Strelitz, the wife of King George III.

== Recent history ==
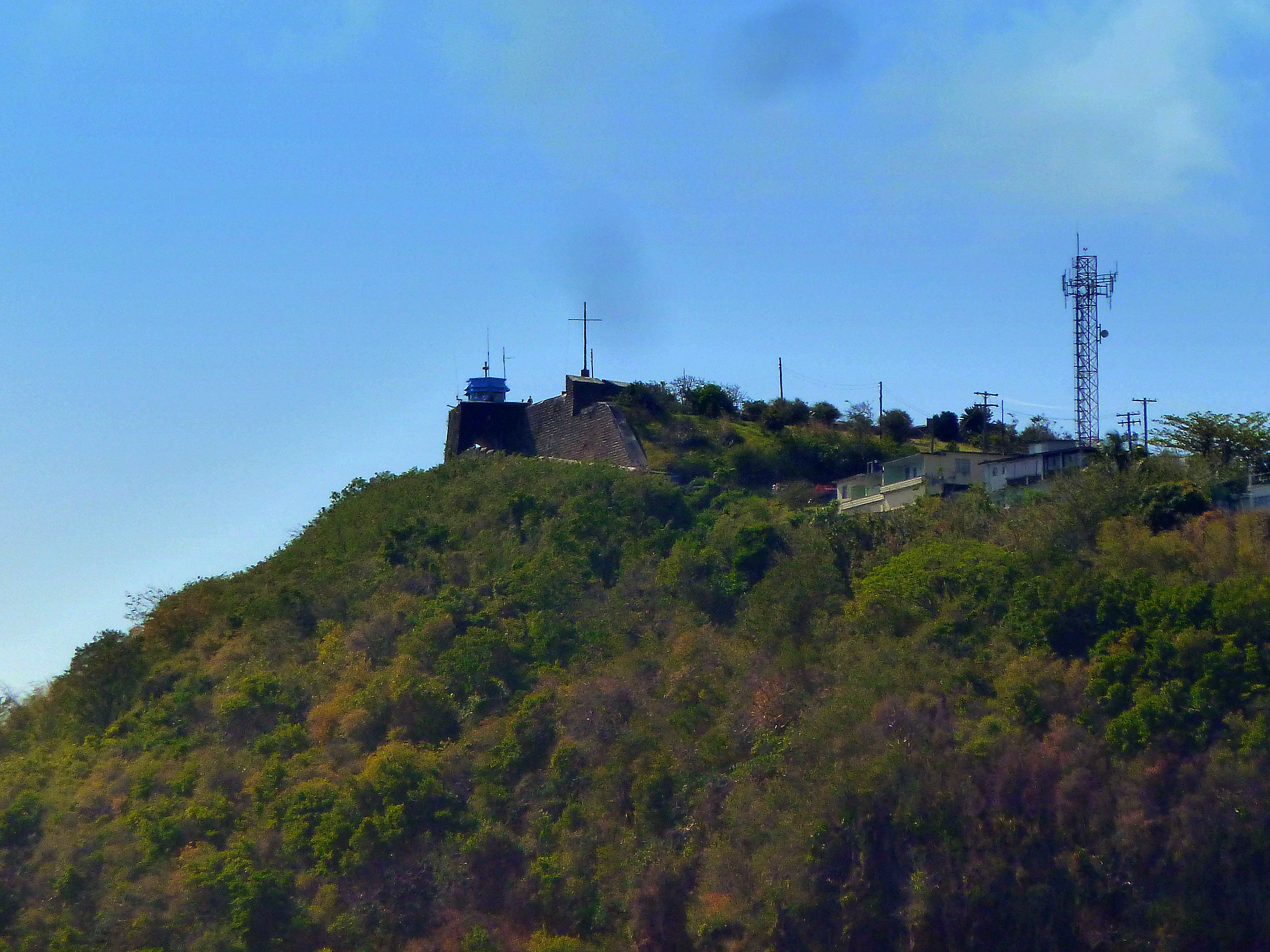
Fort Charlotte

At various times the fort was used as a poor house, a leper colony, and a mental hospital. These institutions were housed in now-ruined barracks, facing Kingstown harbour at the bottom of the hill. The fort served as the Vincentian prison. The main barracks building housed a women’s prison capable of holding 50 prisoners, though it commonly held up to 15 prisoners, and closed in mid 2015. The dry moat was used as the women prisoners’ exercise yard.

Some of the old barracks (the officers’ quarters) now house a small museum with a colourful painted history of the Black Caribs or Garifuna.

== Lighthouse ==
The fort is the home of the Fort Charlotte Light, which acts as a beacon for the entrance to Kingstown Bay, it gives off three white flashes every 20 seconds. The Coastguard radio station and harbour signal station are based here too.

== Other local fortifications ==
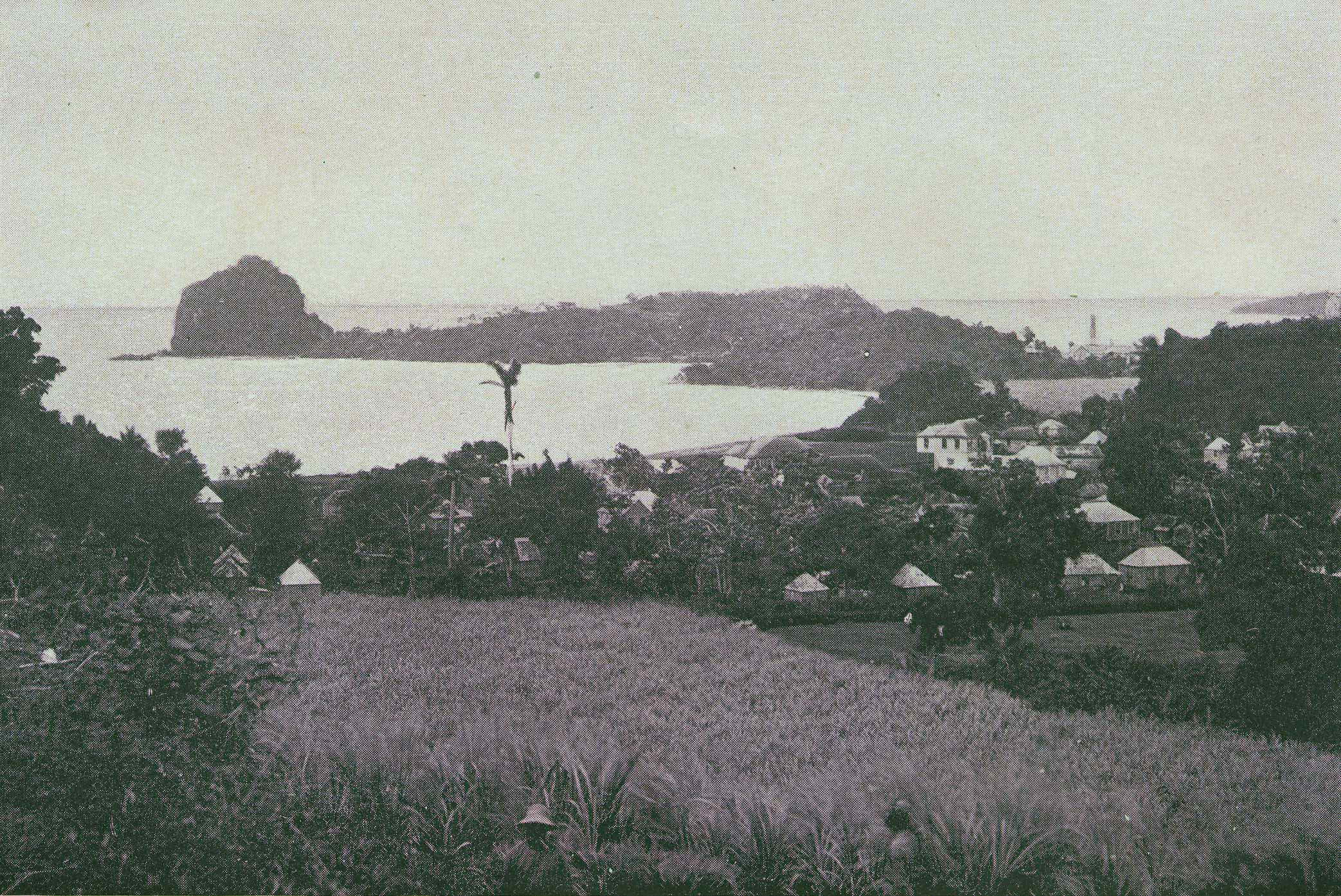
Fort Duvernette and Young's Island from Calliaqua

Fort Duvernette, also known locally as Rock Fort, is now a ruin, although there are still cannon there pointing out to sea. It is located on Duvernette Islet, immediately to the south of Young Island. The islet is a volcanic plug of hard columnar basalt, and rises 195 foot out of the sea.

Wilkie’s Battery is the sister fortification to Fort Duvernette. In the late 1800s the building was converted into the Villa Estate’s cotton drying-house, and later into a private residence in the 1940s. In 1964 it was converted into the Grand View Beach Hotel.

The French built these two forts prior to giving up occupation of the island to the British in 1763. This was at a time when Calliaqua was the commercial hub of the island. Both fell into disrepair once the construction of Fort Charlotte commenced.

=== Panoramic Image ===
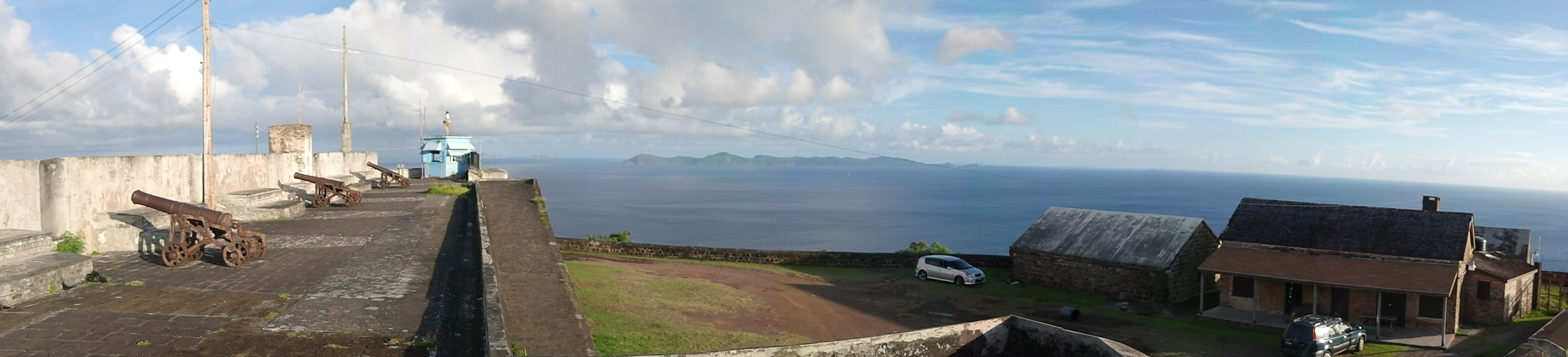
